= BAFTA Award for Best Short Animation =

British film industry award

BAFTA Award for Best British Short Animation
- Awarded for: Best British Short Animation
- Location: United Kingdom
- Presented by: British Academy of Film and Television Arts
- First award: 1984
- Currently held by: Two Black Boys in Paradise (2025)
- Website: https://www.bafta.org/awards/film/short-animated-film

The BAFTA Award for Best British Short Animation is a film award presented by the British Academy of Film and Television Arts (BAFTA) at the annual British Academy Film Awards. BAFTA is a British organisation that hosts annual awards shows for film, television, and video games (and formerly also for children's film and television).

In the following lists, the titles and names in bold with a gold background are the winners and recipients respectively; those not in bold are the remaining nominees. The winner is also the first name listed in each category.

== History ==
The number of nominated films has varied over the course of the award. Four nominations were usual to begin with (with a total of 10 years with four nominations). More recently the number of nominations has been three. The most nominations were in 1997, when there were six nominations. The award has had three different names since its inception including Best Short Animation, Best Short Animation Film and, since 2014, Best British Short Animation.

== Winners and nominees ==
indicates the winner

=== 1980s ===
| Year | Film | Recipient(s) |
Best Short Animation
| **1989** (43rd) | **A Grand Day Out** | **Nick Park** |
| **1989** (43rd) | Creature Comforts | Sara Mullock, Nick Park |
| **1989** (43rd) | Egoli | Karen Kelly |
| **1989** (43rd) | War Story | Peter Lord, Sara Mullock |

=== 1990s ===
| Year | Film | Recipient(s) |
|---|---|---|
| **1990** (44th) | **Toxic** | **Andrew McEwan** |
| **1990** (44th) | Deadsy | David Anderson |
| **1990** (44th) | The Death Of Stalinism In Bohemia | Jan Švankmajer |
| **1991** (45th) | **Balloon** | **Ken Lidster** |
| **1991** (45th) | Adam | Chris Moll, Peter Lord |
| **1991** (45th) | Anamorphosis | Keith Griffiths, Brothers Quay |
| **1991** (45th) | Touch | Debra Smith |
| **1992** (46th) | **Daumier's Law** | **Ginger Gibbons, Geoff Dunbar** |
| **1992** (46th) | A Is For Autism | Dick Arnall, Tim Webb |
| **1992** (46th) | Blindscape | Stephen Palmer |
| **1992** (46th) | Soho Square | Pam Dennis, Sue Paxton, Mario Cavalli |
| **1993** (47th) | **The Wrong Trousers** | **Chris Moll, Nick Park** |
| **1993** (47th) | Bob's Birthday | David Fine, Alison Snowden |
| **1993** (47th) | Britannia | David Parker, Joanna Quinn |
| **1993** (47th) | I Pagliacci | Ken Lidster |
| **1993** (47th) | The Village | Pam Dennis, Mark Baker |
| **1994** (48th) | **The Big Story** | **Tim Watts, David Stoten** |
| **1994** (48th) | The Monk and the Fish | Patrick Evano, Jacques-Rémy Girard, Michaël Dudok de Wit |
| **1994** (48th) | Pib and Pog | Carla Shelley, Peter Peake |
| **1994** (48th) | Stressed | Karen Kelly |
| **1995** (49th) | **A Close Shave** | **Carla Shelly, Michael Rose, Nick Park** |
| **1995** (49th) | Achilles | Glenn Holberton, Barry Purves |
| **1995** (49th) | Gogs Ogof | Deiniol Morris, Michael Mort |
| **1995** (49th) | The Tickler Talks | Steven Harding-Hill |
| **1996** (50th) | **The Old Lady and the Pigeons** | **Bernard La Joie, Didier Brunner, Sylvain Chomet** |
| **1996** (50th) | Famous Fred | John Coates, Catrin Unwin, Joanna Quinn |
| **1996** (50th) | The Saint Inspector | Richard Hutchinson, Mike Booth |
| **1996** (50th) | Testament - The Bible In Animation: Joseph | Elizabeth Babakhina, Aida Ziablikoua |
| **1996** (50th) | Testament - The Bible In Animation: Moses | Naomi Jones, Gary Hurst |
| **1996** (50th) | Trainspotter | Christopher Moll, Jeff Newitt, Neville Astley |
| **1997** (51st) | **Stage Fright** | **Helen Nabarro, Michael Rose, Steve Box** |
| **1997** (51st) | Flatworld | Nigel Pay, Daniel Greaves, Patrick Veale |
| **1997** (51st) | T.R.A.N.S.I.T. | Iain Harvey, Piet Kroon |
| **1997** (51st) | The Traveller | Jeremy Moorshead, Debra Smith |
| **1998** (52nd) | **The Canterbury Tales** | **Aida Zyablikova, Renat Zinnurov, Ashley Potter, Dave Antrobus, Claire Jennings, Mic Graves, Joanna Quinn, Les Mills, Jonathan Myerson** |
| **1998** (52nd) | 1001 Nights | Yukio Sonoyama, Mike Smith |
| **1998** (52nd) | Gogwana | Helen Nabarro, Deiniol Morris, Sion Jones, Michael Mort, Joe Turner |
| **1998** (52nd) | Humdrum | Carla Shelley, Michael Rose and Peter Peake |
| **1999** (53rd) | **The Man With The Beautiful Eyes** | **Jonathan Bairstow, Jonathan Hodgson** |
| **1999** (53rd) | Jolly Roger | Claire Jennings, Mark Baker, Neville Astley |
| **1999** (53rd) | The Old Man And The Sea | Bernard Lajoie, Tatsuo Shimamura, Aleksandr Petrov |
| **1999** (53rd) | The Periwig-Maker | Annette Schäffler, Steffen Schäffler |

=== 2000s ===
| Year | Film | Recipient(s) |
|---|---|---|
| **2000** (54th) | **Father and Daughter** | **Claire Jennings, Willem Thijssen, Michaël Dudok de Wit** |
| **2000** (54th) | Cloud Cover | Lisbeth Svärling |
| **2000** (54th) | Lounge Act | Teun Hilte, Gareth Love |
| **2000** (54th) | Six Of One | Phil Davies, Tim Webb |
| **2001** (55th) | **Dog** | **Suzie Templeton** |
| **2001** (55th) | Camouflage | Jonathan Bairstow, Jonathan Hodgson |
| **2001** (55th) | Home Road Movies | Dick Arnall, Robert Bradbrook, Ian Sellar |
| **2001** (55th) | Tuesday | Geoff Dunbar, Judith Roberts |
| **2001** (55th) | The World Of Interiors | Chris Shepherd, Bunny Schendler |
| **2002** (56th) | **Fish Never Sleep** | **Gaëlle Denis** |
| **2002** (56th) | The ChubbChubbs! | Jacquie Barnbrook, Eric Armstrong, Jeff Wolverton |
| **2002** (56th) | The Dog Who Was A Cat Inside | Andrew Ruhemann, Siân Rees, Siri Melchoir |
| **2002** (56th) | Sap | Lucie Wenigerová, Hyun-Joo Kim |
| **2002** (56th) | Wedding Espresso | Jonathan Bairstow, Sandra Ensby, Lesley Glaister |
| **2003** (57th) | **Jo Jo in the Stars** | **Sue Goffe, Marc Craste** |
| **2003** (57th) | Dad's Dead | Maria Manton, Chris Shepherd |
| **2003** (57th) | Dear Sweet Emma | John Cernak |
| **2003** (57th) | Nibbles | Ron Diamond, Chris Hinton |
| **2003** (57th) | Plumber | Randi Yaffa, Andy Knight, Richard Rosenman |
| **2004** (58th) | **Birthday Boy** | **Andrew Gregory, Sejong Park** |
| **2004** (58th) | City Paradise | Erika Forzy & Gaëlle Denis |
| **2004** (58th) | Heavy Pockets | Jane Robertson, Sarah Cox |
| **2004** (58th) | His Passionate Bride | Sylvie Bringas, Monika Forsberg |
| **2004** (58th) | Little Things | Daniel Greaves |
Best Short Animation Film
| **2005** (59th) | **Fallen Art** | **Jarek Sawko, Piotr Sikora, Tomasz Bagiński** |
| **2005** (59th) | Film Noir | Osbert Parker |
| **2005** (59th) | Kamiya's Correspondence | Sumito Sakakibara |
| **2005** (59th) | The Mysterious Geographic Explorations of Jasper Morello | Anthony Lucas, Julia Lucas, Mark Shirrefs |
| **2005** (59th) | Rabbit | Run Wrake |
| **2006** (60th) | **Guy 101** | **Ian Gouldstone** |
| **2006** (60th) | Dreams And Desires: Family Ties | Les Mills, Joanna Quinn |
| **2006** (60th) | Peter And The Wolf | Hugh Welchman, Alan Dewhurst, Suzie Templeton |
Best Short Animation
| **2007** (61st) | **The Pearce Sisters** | **Jo Allen, Luis Cook** |
| **2007** (61st) | The Crumblegiant | Pearse Moore, John McCloskey |
| **2007** (61st) | Head Over Heels | Osbert Parker, Fiona Pitkin, Ian Gouldstone |
| **2008** (62nd) | **A Matter of Loaf and Death** | **Steve Pegram, Nick Park, Bob Baker** |
| **2008** (62nd) | Codswallop | Greg McLeod, Myles McLeod |
| **2008** (62nd) | Varmints | Sue Goffe, Marc Craste |
| **2009** (63rd) | **Mother of Many** | **Sally Arthur, Emma Lazenby** |
| **2009** (63rd) | The Gruffalo | Michael Rose, Martin Pope, Jakob Schuh, Max Lang |
| **2009** (63rd) | The Happy Duckling | Gili Dolev |

=== 2010s ===
| Year | Film | Recipient(s) |
|---|---|---|
| **2010** (64th) | **The Eagleman Stag** | **Michael Please** |
| **2010** (64th) | Matter Fisher | David Prosser |
| **2010** (64th) | Thursday | Matthias Hoegg |
| **2011** (65th) | **A Morning Stroll** | **Grant Orchard, Sue Goffe** |
| **2011** (65th) | Abuelas | Afarin Eghbal, Francesca Gardiner, Kasia Malipan |
| **2011** (65th) | Bobby Yeah | Robert Morgan |
| **2012** (66th) | **The Making Of Longbird** | **Will Anderson, Ainslie Henderson** |
| **2012** (66th) | Here To Fall | Kris Kelly, Evelyn McGrath |
| **2012** (66th) | I’m Fine Thanks | Eamonn O'Neill |
Best British Short Animation
| **2013** (67th) | **Sleeping With The Fishes** | **Yousif Al-Khalifa, James Walker, Sarah Woolner** |
| **2013** (67th) | I Am Tom Moody | Ainslie Henderson |
| **2013** (67th) | Everything I Can See From Here | Bjorn-Erik Aschim, Friederike Nicolaus, Sam Taylor |
| **2014** (68th) | **The Bigger Picture** | **Chris Hees, Daisy Jacobs, Jennifer Majka** |
| **2014** (68th) | Monkey Love Experiments | Ainslie Henderson, Cam Fraser, Will Anderson |
| **2014** (68th) | My Dad | Marcus Armitage |
| **2015** (69th) | **Edmond** | **Nina Gantz, Emilie Jouffroy** |
| **2015** (69th) | Manoman | Simon Cartwright, Kamilla Kristiane Hodol |
| **2015** (69th) | Prologue | Richard Williams, Imogen Sutton |
| **2016** (70th) | **A Love Story** | **Khaled Gad, Anushka Kishani Naanayakkara, Elena Ruscombe-King** |
| **2016** (70th) | The Alan Dimension | Jac Clinch, Jonathan Harbottle, Millie Marsh |
| **2016** (70th) | Tough | Jennifer Zheng |
| **2017** (71st) | **Poles Apart** | **Paloma Baeza, Ser En Low** |
| **2017** (71st) | Have Heart | Will Anderson |
| **2017** (71st) | Mamoon | Ben Steer |
| **2018** (72nd) | **Roughhouse** | **Jonathan Hodgson, Richard Van Den Boom** |
| **2018** (72nd) | I'm OK | Elizabeth Hobbs, Abigail Addison, Jelena Popovic |
| **2018** (72nd) | Marfa | Greg McLeod, Myles McLeod |
| **2019** (73rd) | **Grandad Was A Romantic** | **Maryam Mohajer** |
| **2019** (73rd) | In Her Boots | Kathrin Steinbacher |
| **2019** (73rd) | The Magic Boat | Naaman Azhari, Lilia Laurel |

=== 2020s ===
| Year | Film | Recipient(s) |
|---|---|---|
| **2020** (74th) | **The Owl and the Pussycat** | **Mole Hill, Laura Duncalf** |
| **2020** (74th) | The Fire Next Time | Renaldho Pelle, Yanling Wang, Kerry Jade Kolbe |
| **2020** (74th) | The Song of a Lost Boy | Daniel Quirke, Jamie MacDonald, Brid Arnstein |
| **2021** (75th) | **Do Not Feed the Pigeons** | **Vladimir Krasilnikov, Jordi Morera, Antonin Niclass** |
| **2021** (75th) | Affairs of the Art | Les Mills, Joanna Quinn |
| **2021** (75th) | Night of the Living Dread | Danielle Goff, Hannah Kelso, Ida Melum, Laura Jayne Tunbridge |
| **2022** (76th) | **The Boy, the Mole, the Fox and the Horse** | **Peter Baynton, Charlie Mackesy, Cara Speller and Hannah Minghella** |
| **2022** (76th) | Middle Watch | John Stevenson, Aiesha Penwarden and Giles Healy |
| **2022** (76th) | Your Mountain Is Waiting | Hannah Jacobs, Zoe Muslim and Harriet Gillian |
| **2023** (77th) | **Crab Day** | **Ross Stringer, Bartosz Stanislawek and Aleksandra Sykulak** |
| **2023** (77th) | Visible Mending | Samantha Moore and Tilley Bancroft |
| **2023** (77th) | Wild Summon | Karni Arieli, Saul Freed and Jay Woolley |
| **2024** (78th) | **Wander to Wonder** | **Nina Gantz, Stienette Bosklopper, Simon Cartwright and Maarten Swart** |
| **2024** (78th) | Adiós | José Prats, Natalia Kyriacou and Bernardo Angeletti |
| **2024** (78th) | Mog's Christmas | Robin Shaw, Joanna Harrison, Camilla Deakin and Ruth Fielding |
**2025** (79th)
| **2025** (79th) | **Two Black Boys in Paradise** | **Baz Sells, Dean Atta, and Ben Jackson** |
| **2025** (79th) | Cardboard | J.P. Vine and Michaela Manas Malina |
| **2025** (79th) | Solstice | Luke Angus |

== See also ==
- Academy Award for Best Animated Short Film
- BAFTA Award for Best Animated Film
