= 65th British Academy Film Awards =

2012 film award ceremony

- Date: 12 February 2012
- Site: Royal Opera House, London
- Hosted by: Stephen Fry

Highlights
- Best Film: The Artist
- Best British Film: Tinker Tailor Soldier Spy
- Best Actor: Jean Dujardin; The Artist
- Best Actress: Meryl Streep; The Iron Lady
- Most awards: The Artist (7)
- Most nominations: The Artist (12)

The 65th British Academy Film Awards, more commonly known as the BAFTAs, were held on 12 February 2012 at the Royal Opera House in London, honouring the best national and foreign films of 2011. Presented by the British Academy of Film and Television Arts, accolades are handed out for the best feature-length film and documentaries of any nationality that were screened at British cinemas in 2011.

The nominations were announced on 17 January 2012 by actor Daniel Radcliffe and actress Holliday Grainger. The Artist won seven awards out of its twelve nominations, including Best Film, Best Director for Michel Hazanavicius, and Best Actor for Jean Dujardin. Meryl Streep won Best Actress for The Iron Lady. Christopher Plummer won Best Supporting Actor for Beginners and Octavia Spencer won Best Supporting Actress for The Help. Tinker Tailor Soldier Spy, directed by Tomas Alfredson, was voted Outstanding British Film of 2011. Director Martin Scorsese was given the BAFTA Fellowship and Sir John Hurt garnered the BAFTA Outstanding British Contribution to Cinema Award.

Stephen Fry, who hosted from 2001 to 2006, returned to host the ceremony.

== Winners and nominees ==
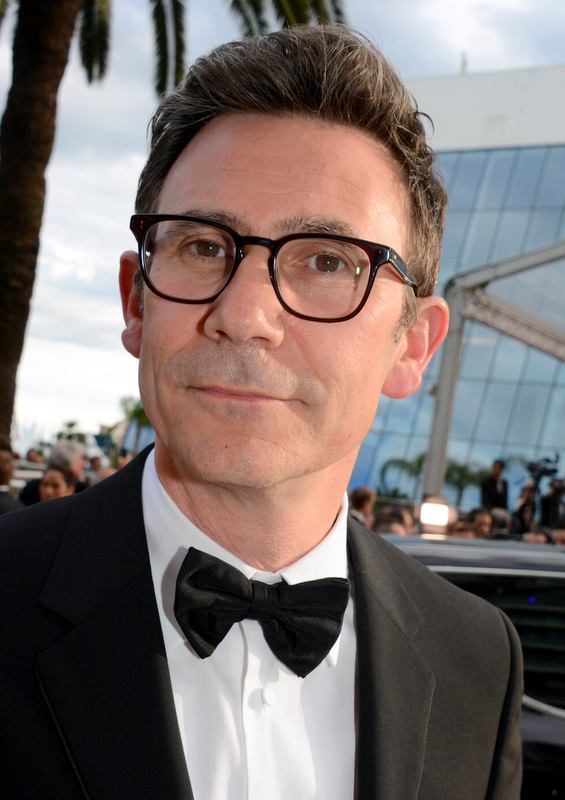
Michel Hazanavicius, Best Director and Best Original Screenplay winner

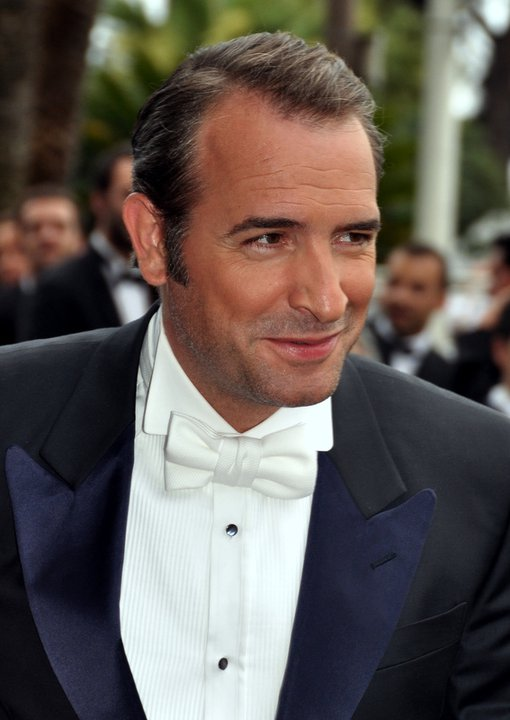
Jean Dujardin, Best Actor winner

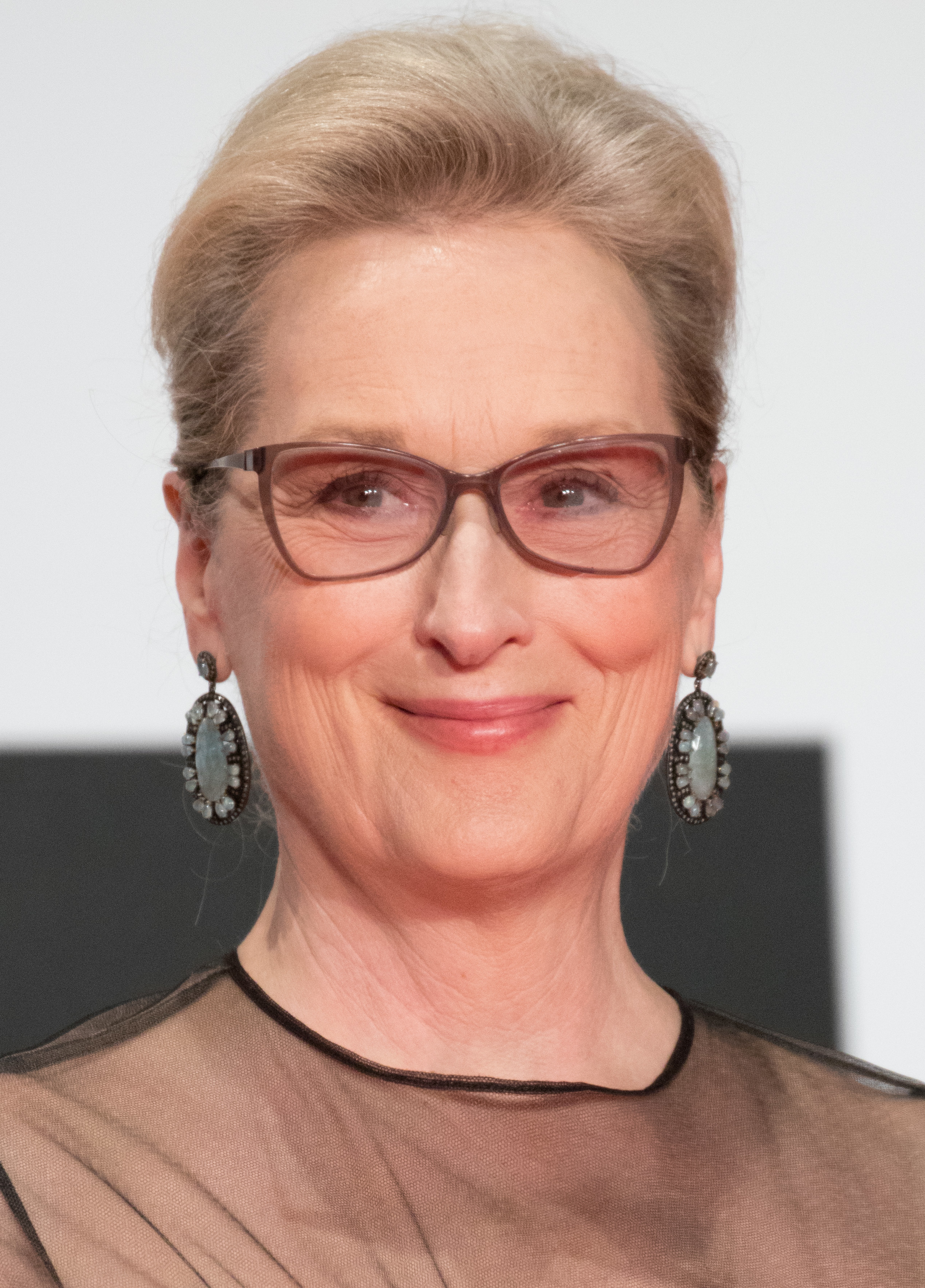
Meryl Streep, Best Actress winner

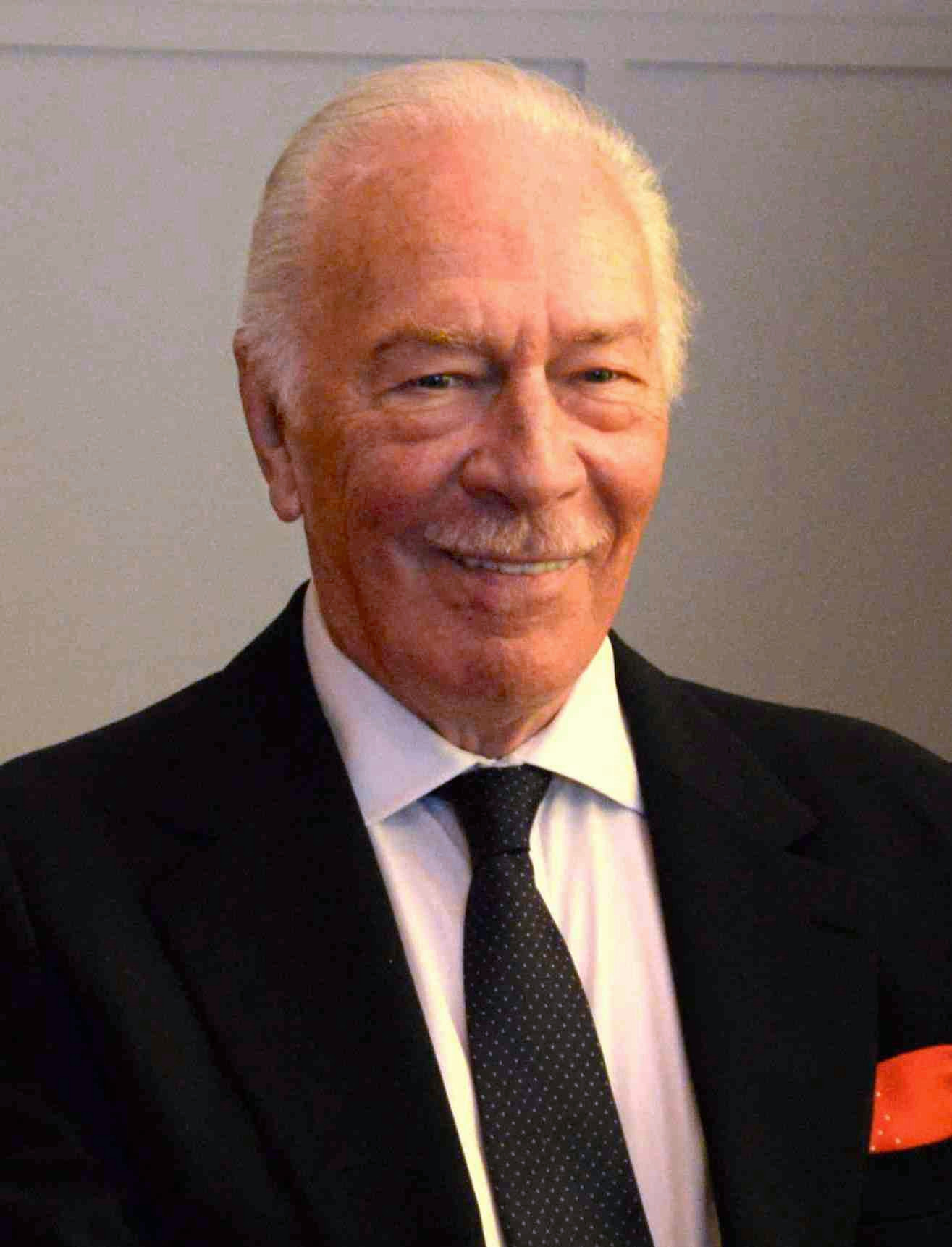
Christopher Plummer, Best Supporting Actor winner

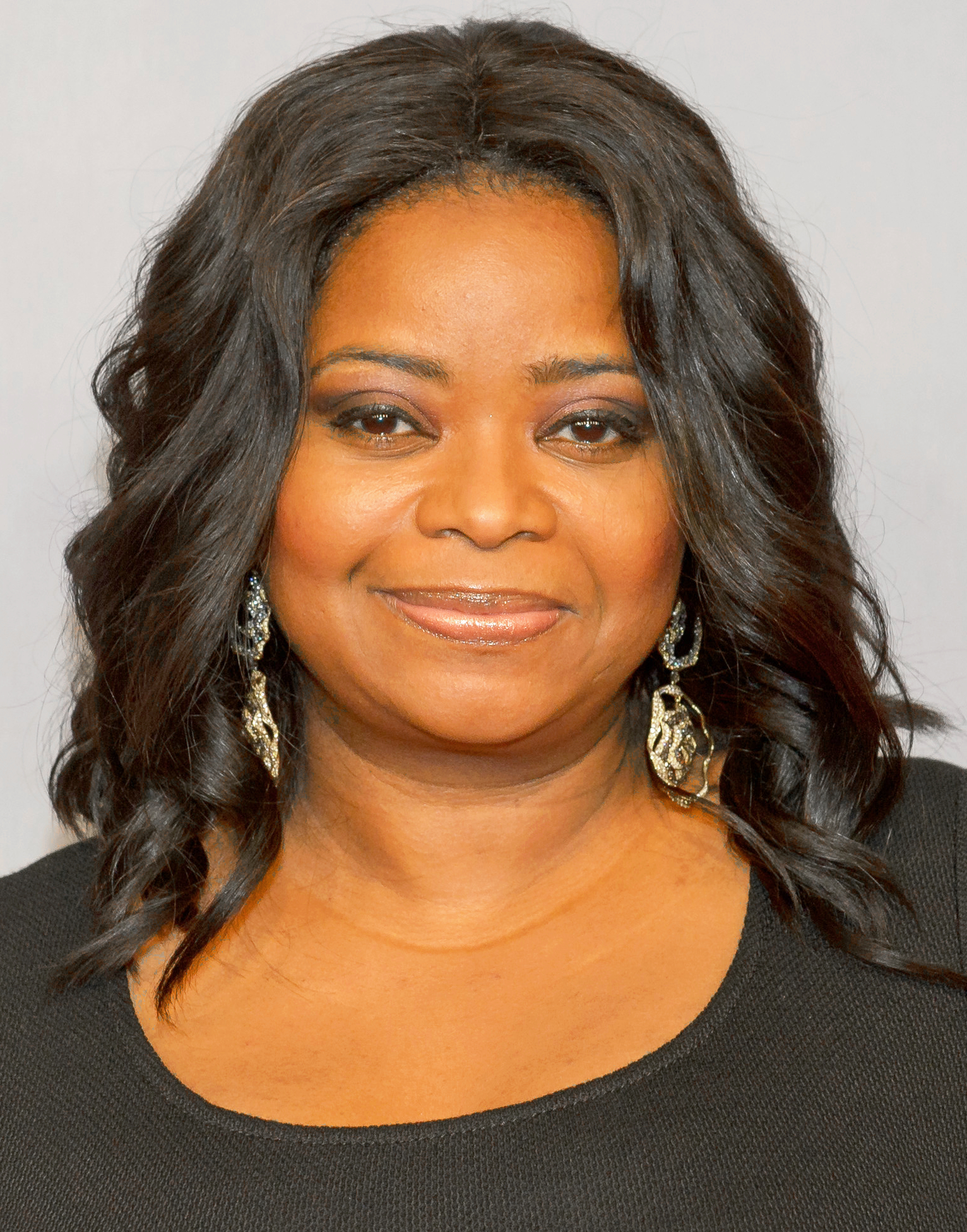
Octavia Spencer, Best Supporting Actress winner

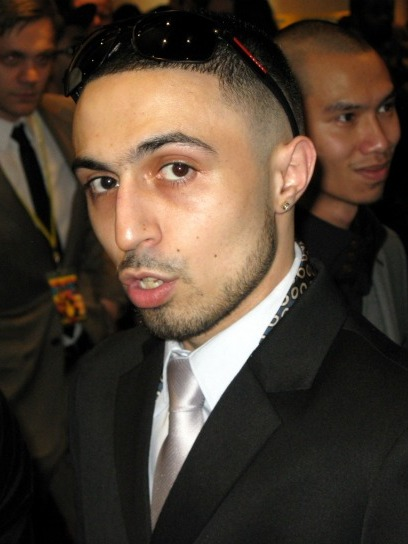
Adam Deacon, Orange Rising Star Award winner

=== BAFTA Fellowship ===
- **Martin Scorsese**

=== Outstanding British Contribution to Cinema ===
- **Sir John Hurt**

=== Awards ===
Winners are listed first and highlighted in boldface.

**Best Film**: **The Artist – Thomas Langmann**; The Descendants – Jim Burke, Alexander Payne and Jim Taylor; Drive – Marc Platt and Adam Siegel; The Help – Michael Barnathan, Chris Columbus and Brunson Green; Tinker Tailor Soldier Spy – Tim Bevan, Eric Fellner and Robyn Slovo	**Best Direction**: **Michel Hazanavicius – The Artist**; Tomas Alfredson – Tinker Tailor Soldier Spy; Lynne Ramsay – We Need to Talk About Kevin; Nicolas Winding Refn – Drive; Martin Scorsese – Hugo
**Best Actor in a Leading Role**: **Jean Dujardin – The Artist as George Valentin**; George Clooney – The Descendants as Matthew King; Michael Fassbender – Shame as Brandon Sullivan; Gary Oldman – Tinker Tailor Soldier Spy as George Smiley; Brad Pitt – Moneyball as Billy Beane	**Best Actress in a Leading Role**: **Meryl Streep – The Iron Lady as Margaret Thatcher**; Bérénice Bejo – The Artist as Peppy Miller; Viola Davis – The Help as Aibileen Clark; Tilda Swinton – We Need to Talk About Kevin as Eva Khatchadourian; Michelle Williams – My Week with Marilyn as Marilyn Monroe
**Best Actor in a Supporting Role**: **Christopher Plummer – Beginners as Hal Fields**; Kenneth Branagh – My Week with Marilyn as Laurence Olivier; Jim Broadbent – The Iron Lady as Denis Thatcher; Jonah Hill – Moneyball as Peter Brand; Philip Seymour Hoffman – The Ides of March as Paul Zara	**Best Actress in a Supporting Role**: **Octavia Spencer – The Help as Minerva Jackson**; Jessica Chastain – The Help as Celia Rae Foote; Judi Dench – My Week with Marilyn as Sybil Thorndike; Melissa McCarthy – Bridesmaids as Megan Price; Carey Mulligan – Drive as Irene
**Best Original Screenplay**: **The Artist – Michel Hazanavicius**; Bridesmaids – Annie Mumolo and Kristen Wiig; The Guard – John Michael McDonagh; The Iron Lady – Abi Morgan; Midnight in Paris – Woody Allen	**Best Adapted Screenplay**: **Tinker Tailor Soldier Spy – Bridget O'Connor and Peter Straughan**; The Descendants – Nat Faxon, Alexander Payne and Jim Rash; The Help – Tate Taylor; The Ides of March – George Clooney, Grant Heslov and Beau Willimon; Moneyball – Aaron Sorkin and Steven Zaillian
**Best Cinematography**: **The Artist – Guillaume Schiffman**; The Girl with the Dragon Tattoo – Jeff Cronenweth; Hugo – Robert Richardson; Tinker Tailor Soldier Spy – Hoyte van Hoytema; War Horse – Janusz Kamiński	**Best Costume Design**: **The Artist – Mark Bridges**; Hugo – Sandy Powell; Jane Eyre – Michael O'Connor; My Week with Marilyn – Jill Taylor; Tinker Tailor Soldier Spy – Jacqueline Durran
**Best Editing**: **Senna – Gregers Sall and Chris King**; The Artist – Anne-Sophie Bion and Michel Hazanavicius; Drive – Mat Newman; Hugo – Thelma Schoonmaker; Tinker Tailor Soldier Spy – Dino Jonsater	**Best Makeup and Hair**: **The Iron Lady – Mark Coulier, J. Roy Helland and Marese Langan**; The Artist – Cydney Cornell and Julie Hewett; Harry Potter and the Deathly Hallows – Part 2 – Nick Dudman, Amanda Knight and Lisa Tomblin; Hugo – Jan Archibald and Morag Ross; My Week with Marilyn – Jenny Shircore
**Best Original Music**: **The Artist – Ludovic Bource**; The Girl with the Dragon Tattoo – Trent Reznor and Atticus Ross; Hugo – Howard Shore; Tinker Tailor Soldier Spy – Alberto Iglesias; War Horse – John Williams	**Best Production Design**: **Hugo – Dante Ferretti and Francesca Lo Schiavo**; The Artist – Laurence Bennett and Robert Gould; Harry Potter and the Deathly Hallows – Part 2 – Stuart Craig and Stephenie McMillan; Tinker Tailor Soldier Spy – Maria Djurkovic and Tatiana Macdonald; War Horse – Rick Carter and Lee Sandales
**Best Sound**: **Hugo – Tom Fleischman, Eugene Gearty, John Midgley and Philip Stockton**; The Artist – Michael Krikorian, Gerard Lamps and Nadine Muse; Harry Potter and the Deathly Hallows – Part 2 – Mike Dowson, Stuart Hilliker, James Mather, Adam Scrivener and Stuart Wilson; Tinker Tailor Soldier Spy – Howard Bargroff, John Casali, Doug Cooper, Stephen Griffiths and Andy Shelley; War Horse – Richard Hymns, Tom Johnson, Andy Nelson, Gary Rydstrom and Stuart Wilson	**Best Special Visual Effects**: **Harry Potter and the Deathly Hallows – Part 2 – Tim Burke, Greg Butler, John Richardson and David Vickery**; The Adventures of Tintin – Jamie Beard, Joe Letteri, Keith Miller and Wayne Stables; Hugo – Ben Grossmann, Alex Henning, Robert Legato and Joss Williams; Rise of the Planet of the Apes – Daniel Barrett, Dan Lemmon, Joe Letteri and R. Christopher White; War Horse – Neil Corbould and Ben Morris
**Outstanding British Film**: **Tinker Tailor Soldier Spy – Tomas Alfredson, Tim Bevan, Eric Fellner, Bridget O'Connor, Robyn Slovo and Peter Straughan**; My Week with Marilyn – Simon Curtis, Adrian Hodges, David Parfitt and Harvey Weinstein; Senna – Tim Bevan, Eric Fellner, James Gay-Rees, Asif Kapadia and Manish Pandey; Shame – Iain Canning, Steve McQueen, Abi Morgan and Emile Sherman; We Need to Talk About Kevin – Jennifer Fox, Rory Stewart Kinnear, Lynne Ramsay, Luc Roeg and Robert Salerno	**Outstanding Debut by a British Writer, Director or Producer**: **Tyrannosaur – Paddy Considine (Director) and Diarmid Scrimshaw (Producer)**; Attack the Block – Joe Cornish (Director); Black Pond – Sarah Brocklehurst (Producer), Tom Kingsley and Will Sharpe (Director); Coriolanus – Ralph Fiennes (Director); Submarine – Richard Ayoade (Director)
**Best Short Animation**: **A Morning Stroll – Sue Goffe and Grant Orchard**; Abuelas – Afarin Eghbal, Francesca Gardiner and Kasia Malipan; Bobby Yeah – Robert Morgan	**Best Short Film**: **Pitch Black Heist – John Maclean and Geradine O'Flynn**; Chalk – Martina Amati, Ilaria Bernardini, James Bolton and Gavin Emerson; Mwansa the Great – Gabriel Gauchet and Rungano Nyoni; Only Sound Remains – Arash Ashtiani and Anshu Poddar; Two & Two – Babak Anvari, Gavin Cullen and Kit Fraser
**Best Animated Film**: **Rango – Gore Verbinski**; The Adventures of Tintin – Steven Spielberg; Arthur Christmas – Sarah Smith	**Best Documentary**: **Senna – Tim Bevan, Eric Fellner, James Gay-Rees, Asif Kapadia and Manish Pandey**; George Harrison: Living in the Material World – Olivia Harrison, Martin Scorsese and Nigel Sinclair; Project Nim – Simon Chinn and James Marsh
**Best Film Not in the English Language**: **The Skin I Live In – Agustín Almodóvar and Pedro Almodóvar**; Incendies – Luc Déry, Kim McCraw and Denis Villeneuve; Pina – Gian-Piero Ringel and Wim Wenders; Potiche – Eric Altmayer, Nicolas Altmayer and François Ozon; A Separation – Asghar Farhadi	**Rising Star Award**: **Adam Deacon**; Chris Hemsworth; Tom Hiddleston; Chris O'Dowd; Eddie Redmayne

== Statistics ==
Films that received multiple nominations
Nominations	Film
12	The Artist
11	Tinker Tailor Soldier Spy
9	Hugo
6	My Week with Marilyn
5	The Help
5	War Horse
4	Drive
4	Harry Potter and the Deathly Hallows – Part 2
4	The Iron Lady
3	The Descendants
3	Moneyball
3	Senna
3	We Need to Talk About Kevin
2	The Adventures of Tintin
2	Bridesmaids
2	The Girl with the Dragon Tattoo
2	The Ides of March
2	Shame

Films that received multiple awards
Awards	Film
7	The Artist
2	Hugo
2	The Iron Lady
2	Senna
2	Tinker Tailor Soldier Spy

== In Memoriam ==
- Jane Russell
- Bingham Ray
- Michael Gough
- Richard Leacock
- Shammi Kapoor
- Ken Russell
- Syd Cain
- Eva Monley
- Nicol Williamson
- Whitney Houston
- Theodoros Angelopoulos
- Laura Ziskin
- Arthur Laurents
- Hugh Martin
- Richard Pointing
- Ben Gazzara
- Shelagh Delaney
- Bubba Smith
- Steve Jobs
- Sidney Lumet
- Farley Granger
- John Mackenzie
- Michael Cacoyannis
- John Calley
- Bridget O'Connor
- Elizabeth Taylor

== See also ==
- 1st AACTA International Awards
- 84th Academy Awards
- 37th César Awards
- 17th Critics' Choice Awards
- 64th Directors Guild of America Awards
- 25th European Film Awards
- 69th Golden Globe Awards
- 32nd Golden Raspberry Awards
- 26th Goya Awards
- 27th Independent Spirit Awards
- 17th Lumière Awards
- 2nd Magritte Awards
- 23rd Producers Guild of America Awards
- 16th Satellite Awards
- 38th Saturn Awards
- 18th Screen Actors Guild Awards
- 64th Writers Guild of America Awards
