= List of accolades received by The Artist (film) =

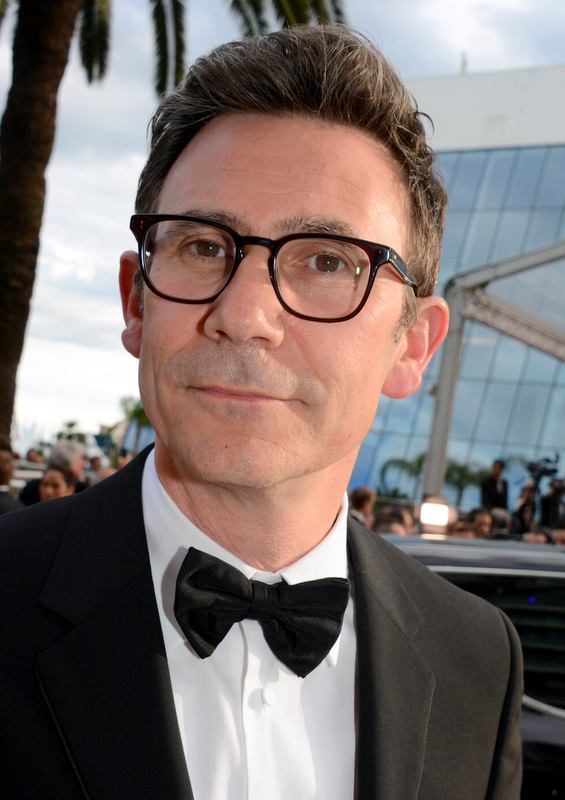
- Michel Hazanavicius won several accolades for directing and writing The Artist.
Accolades
Award	Wins	Nominations
AACTA International Awards	3	4
AARP's Movies for Grownups Awards	2	2
Academy Awards	5	10
Alliance of Women Film Journalists	3	9
ALMA Awards	0	1
American Cinema Editors Awards	1	1
American Film Institute	1	1
American Society of Cinematographers	0	1
Art Directors Guild Awards	0	1
Austin Film Critics Association	0	1
Austin Film Festival	1	1
Belgian Syndicate of Cinema Critics	1	1
BMI Film & TV Awards	1	1
Boston Society of Film Critics	3	3
British Academy Film Awards	7	12
British Independent Film Awards	3	6
Cannes Film Festival	2	3
Casting Society of America	1	1
César Awards	6	10
Chicago Film Critics Association	1	5
Cinematik Film Festival Piešťany	1	2
Costume Designers Guild Awards	0	1
Critics' Choice Movie Awards	4	11
Dallas–Fort Worth Film Critics Association	4	4
David di Donatello	0	1
Detroit Film Critics Society	2	5
Directors Guild of America Awards	1	1
Dublin Film Critics' Circle	1	1
European Film Awards	1	3
Evening Standard British Film Awards	1	3
Florida Film Critics Circle	1	1
Gay and Lesbian Entertainment Critics Association	0	1
Georgia Film Critics Association	0	3
Golden Eagle Award	1	1
Golden Globe Awards	3	6
Golden Trailer Awards	1	1
Goya Awards	1	1
Grammy Awards	0	1
Houston Film Critics Society	1	7
Independent Spirit Awards	4	5
Leeds International Film Festival	1	1
London Film Critics' Circle	3	4
National Board of Review	1	1
National Society of Film Critics	1	1
New York Film Critics Circle Awards	3	3
New York Film Critics Online	3	3
Online Film Critics Society	0	4
Producers Guild of America Award	1	1
San Diego Film Critics Society	1	9
San Sebastián International Film Festival	1	1
Santa Barbara International Film Festival	1	1
Satellite Awards	1	6
Screen Actors Guild Awards	1	3
St. Louis Film Critics Association	5	6
St. Louis International Film Festival	1	1
Toronto Film Critics Association	2	2
Vancouver Film Critics Circle	2	4
Washington D.C. Area Film Critics Association	2	7
Women Film Critics Circle	1	2

Totals (Note: Certain award groups do not simply award one winner. They acknowledge several different recipients, have runners-up, and have third place. Since this is a specific recognition and is different from losing an award, runner-up mentions are considered wins in this award tally. For simplification and to avoid errors, each award in this list has been presumed to have had a prior nomination.)
- Wins: 99
- Nominations: 196

The Artist is a 2011 French romantic comedy-drama film directed and written by Michel Hazanavicius. The film is set in Hollywood between 1927 and 1932 and focuses on a declining film star (played by Jean Dujardin) and a rising actress (played by Berenice Bejo), as silent cinema falls out of fashion and is replaced by the talkies. The film premiered at the 64th Cannes Film Festival on 15 May 2011, where Dujardin won the Best Actor Award. It was released in France on 12 October 2011. Following successful screenings at the Telluride Film Festival, the Toronto International Film Festival, and the New York Film Festival, The Artist was released on 23 November 2011 in the United States. The film earned a worldwide box office total of more than $133 million. Rotten Tomatoes, a review aggregator, surveyed 320 reviews and judged 95% to be positive.

The Artist became the most honoured French film in history. The film garnered several awards and nominations with particular praise for the direction, the acting of its cast, the screenplay, the score, the cinematography, the editing, and the costumes. The film garnered ten nominations at the 84th Academy Awards, and went on to win five awards, including Best Picture, Best Director (Hazanavicius), and Best Actor (Dujardin). It is the first silent feature to win Best Picture after Wings at the inaugural ceremony in 1929 and the first black and white film to win the award since 1993's Schindler's List. Dujardin became the first French actor to win an Oscar. The film was named Best Feature at the 27th Independent Spirit Awards. It received twelve nominations at the 65th British Academy Film Awards, winning seven awards, including Best Film, Best Director, and Best Actor. At the 37th César Awards ceremony, the film earned six awards, including Best Film and Best Actress (Bejo).

The Artist received six nominations at the 69th Golden Globe Awards, winning three, including Best Motion Picture – Musical or Comedy and Best Actor – Motion Picture Musical or Comedy (Dujardin). At the 18th Screen Actors Guild Awards, Dujardin won the award for Outstanding Performance by a Male Actor in a Leading Role. The film won the Best Theatrical Motion Picture at the 23rd Producers Guild of America Awards; Hazanavicius won Best Director at the 64th Directors Guild of America Awards. The 17th Critics' Choice Awards, 77th New York Film Critics Circle Awards, and the 32nd London Film Critics' Circle Awards named the film Best Picture.

== Accolades ==
Award	Date of ceremony (Note: Each date is linked to the article about the awards held that year, wherever possible.)	Category	Recipients	Result	Ref.
AACTA International Awards	27 January 2012	Best Film – International	Thomas Langmann	Won	
AACTA International Awards	27 January 2012	Best Direction – International	Michel Hazanavicius	Won	
AACTA International Awards	27 January 2012	Best Actor – International	Jean Dujardin	Won	
AACTA International Awards	27 January 2012	Best Screenplay – International	Michel Hazanavicius	Nominated	
AARP Movies for Grownups Awards	20 January 2012	Best Movie for Grownups	The Artist	Won	
AARP Movies for Grownups Awards	20 January 2012	Best Comedy	The Artist	Won	
Academy Awards	26 February 2012	Best Picture	Thomas Langmann	Won	
Academy Awards	26 February 2012	Best Director	Michel Hazanavicius	Won	
Academy Awards	26 February 2012	Best Actor	Jean Dujardin	Won	
Academy Awards	26 February 2012	Best Supporting Actress	Bérénice Bejo	Nominated	
Academy Awards	26 February 2012	Best Original Screenplay	Michel Hazanavicius	Nominated	
Academy Awards	26 February 2012	Best Art Direction	Laurence Bennett and Robert Gould	Nominated	
Academy Awards	26 February 2012	Best Cinematography	Guillaume Schiffman	Nominated	
Academy Awards	26 February 2012	Best Costume Design	Mark Bridges	Won	
Academy Awards	26 February 2012	Best Film Editing	Anne-Sophie Bion and Michel Hazanavicius	Nominated	
Academy Awards	26 February 2012	Best Original Score	Ludovic Bource	Won	
Alliance of Women Film Journalists	10 January 2012	Best Film	The Artist	Won	
Alliance of Women Film Journalists	10 January 2012	Best Director	Michel Hazanavicius	Won	
Alliance of Women Film Journalists	10 January 2012	Best Actor	Jean Dujardin	Nominated	
Alliance of Women Film Journalists	10 January 2012	Best Supporting Actress	Bérénice Bejo	Nominated	
Alliance of Women Film Journalists	10 January 2012	Best Original Screenplay	Michel Hazanavicius	Nominated	
Alliance of Women Film Journalists	10 January 2012	Best Cinematography	Guillaume Schiffman	Nominated	
Alliance of Women Film Journalists	10 January 2012	Best Editing	Anne-Sophie Bion and Michel Hazanavicius	Nominated	
Alliance of Women Film Journalists	10 January 2012	Best Film Music or Score	Ludovic Bource	Nominated	
Alliance of Women Film Journalists	10 January 2012	Unforgettable Moment Award	The Artist	Won	
ALMA Awards	16 September 2012	Favorite Movie Actress – Comedy/Musical	Bérénice Bejo	Nominated	
American Cinema Editors	18 February 2012	Best Edited Feature Film – Comedy or Musical	Anne-Sophie Bion and Michel Hazanavicius	Won	
American Film Institute	11 December 2011	AFI Special Awards	The Artist	Won	
American Society of Cinematographers	12 February 2012	Outstanding Achievement in Cinematography in Theatrical Releases	Guillaume Schiffman	Nominated	
Art Directors Guild	4 February 2012	Period Film	Laurence Bennett, Greg Hooper, Joshua Lusby, Adam Mull, Jamie Rama, Martin Charles, and Robert Gould	Nominated	
Austin Film Critics Association	28 December 2011	Best Film	The Artist	6th Place	
Belgian Syndicate of Cinema Critics	7 January 2012	Grand Prix	The Artist	Won	
BMI Film & TV Awards	17 May 2012	Film Music Award	Ludovic Bource	Won	
Boston Society of Film Critics	11 December 2011	Best Picture	The Artist	Won	
Boston Society of Film Critics	11 December 2011	Best Director	Michel Hazanavicius	Runner-up	
Boston Society of Film Critics	11 December 2011	Best Use of Music in a Film	Ludovic Bource (Note: Tied with Drive.)	Won	
British Academy Film Awards	12 February 2012	Best Film	Thomas Langmann	Won	
British Academy Film Awards	12 February 2012	Best Direction	Michel Hazanavicius	Won	
British Academy Film Awards	12 February 2012	Best Actor	Jean Dujardin	Won	
British Academy Film Awards	12 February 2012	Best Actress	Bérénice Bejo	Nominated	
British Academy Film Awards	12 February 2012	Best Original Screenplay	Michel Hazanavicius	Won	
British Academy Film Awards	12 February 2012	Best Music	Ludovic Bource	Won	
British Academy Film Awards	12 February 2012	Best Cinematography	Guillaume Schiffman	Won	
British Academy Film Awards	12 February 2012	Best Editing	Anne-Sophie Bion and Michel Hazanavicius	Nominated	
British Academy Film Awards	12 February 2012	Production Design	Laurence Bennett and Robert Gould	Nominated	
British Academy Film Awards	12 February 2012	Costume Design	Mark Bridges	Won	
British Academy Film Awards	12 February 2012	Best Sound	Michael Krikorian, Gérard Lamps, and Nadine Muse	Nominated	
British Academy Film Awards	12 February 2012	Best Make-up and Hair	Cydney Cornell and Julie Hewett	Nominated	
Cannes Film Festival	22 May 2011	Palme d'Or	Michel Hazanavicius	Nominated	
Cannes Film Festival	22 May 2011	Best Actor	Jean Dujardin	Won	
Cannes Film Festival	22 May 2011	Palm Dog Award	Uggie	Won	
Casting Society of America	29 October 2012	Feature – Studio or Independent – Comedy	Heidi Levitt and Michael Sanford	Won	
César Awards	24 February 2012	Best Film	The Artist	Won	
César Awards	24 February 2012	Best Director	Michel Hazanavicius	Won	
César Awards	24 February 2012	Best Actor	Jean Dujardin	Nominated	
César Awards	24 February 2012	Best Actress	Bérénice Bejo	Won	
César Awards	24 February 2012	Best Original Screenplay	Michel Hazanavicius	Nominated	
César Awards	24 February 2012	Best Cinematography	Guillaume Schiffman	Won	
César Awards	24 February 2012	Best Editing	Anne-Sophie Bion and Michel Hazanavicius	Nominated	
César Awards	24 February 2012	Best Production Design	Laurence Bennett	Won	
César Awards	24 February 2012	Best Costume Design	Mark Bridges	Nominated	
César Awards	24 February 2012	Best Music Written for a Film	Ludovic Bource	Won	
Chicago Film Critics Association	7 January 2012	Best Film	The Artist	Nominated	
Chicago Film Critics Association	7 January 2012	Best Director	Michel Hazanavicius	Nominated	
Chicago Film Critics Association	7 January 2012	Best Actor	Jean Dujardin	Nominated	
Chicago Film Critics Association	7 January 2012	Best Original Screenplay	Michel Hazanavicius	Won	
Chicago Film Critics Association	7 January 2012	Best Original Score	Ludovic Bource	Nominated	
IFF Cinematik Piešťany	12 September 2012	Meeting Point Europe Award	The Artist	Won	
IFF Cinematik Piešťany	12 September 2012	Audience Award	The Artist	Nominated	
The Comedy Awards	6 May 2012	Comedy Film	The Artist	Nominated	
The Comedy Awards	6 May 2012	Performance by an Actor – Film	Jean Dujardin	Won	
The Comedy Awards	6 May 2012	Comedy Director – Film	Michel Hazanavicius	Nominated	
Costume Designers Guild	21 February 2012	Excellence in Period Film	Mark Bridges	Nominated	
Critics' Choice Movie Awards	12 January 2012	Best Picture	The Artist	Won	
Critics' Choice Movie Awards	12 January 2012	Best Actor	Jean Dujardin	Nominated	
Critics' Choice Movie Awards	12 January 2012	Best Supporting Actress	Bérénice Bejo	Nominated	
Critics' Choice Movie Awards	12 January 2012	Best Acting Ensemble	The Artist	Nominated	
Critics' Choice Movie Awards	12 January 2012	Best Director	Michel Hazanavicius	Won	
Critics' Choice Movie Awards	12 January 2012	Best Original Screenplay	Michel Hazanavicius	Nominated	
Critics' Choice Movie Awards	12 January 2012	Best Cinematography	Guillaume Schiffman	Nominated	
Critics' Choice Movie Awards	12 January 2012	Best Art Direction	Laurence Bennett and Gregory S. Hooper	Nominated	
Critics' Choice Movie Awards	12 January 2012	Best Editing	Anne-Sophie Bion and Michel Hazanavicius	Nominated	
Critics' Choice Movie Awards	12 January 2012	Best Costume Design	Mark Bridges	Won	
Critics' Choice Movie Awards	12 January 2012	Best Composer	Ludovic Bource	Won	
Dallas–Fort Worth Film Critics Association	16 December 2011	Best Film	The Artist	2nd Place	
Dallas–Fort Worth Film Critics Association	16 December 2011	Best Director	Michel Hazanavicius	2nd Place	
Dallas–Fort Worth Film Critics Association	16 December 2011	Best Actor	Jean Dujardin	2nd Place	
Dallas–Fort Worth Film Critics Association	16 December 2011	Best Supporting Actress	Bérénice Bejo	2nd Place	
David di Donatello	4 May 2012	Best European Film	The Artist	Nominated	
Detroit Film Critics Society	16 December 2011	Best Film	The Artist	Won	
Detroit Film Critics Society	16 December 2011	Best Director	Michel Hazanavicius	Won	
Detroit Film Critics Society	16 December 2011	Best Actor	Jean Dujardin	Nominated	
Detroit Film Critics Society	16 December 2011	Best Supporting Actress	Bérénice Bejo	Nominated	
Detroit Film Critics Society	16 December 2011	Best Screenplay	Michel Hazanavicius	Nominated	
Directors Guild Awards	28 January 2012	Outstanding Directing – Feature Film	Michel Hazanavicius	Won	
Dublin Film Critics' Circle	21 December 2012	Best Film	The Artist	Won	
European Film Awards	3 December 2011	Best Film	The Artist	Nominated	
European Film Awards	3 December 2011	Best Composer	Ludovic Bource	Won	
European Film Awards	3 December 2011	Best Cinematographer	Guillaume Schiffman	Nominated	
Florida Film Critics Circle	19 December 2011	Best Original Screenplay	Michel Hazanavicius	Won	
Gay and Lesbian Entertainment Critics Association	16 January 2012	Film of the Year	The Artist	Nominated	
Georgia Film Critics Association	17 January 2012	Best Supporting Actress	Bérénice Bejo	Nominated	
Georgia Film Critics Association	17 January 2012	Best Original Screenplay	Michel Hazanavicius	Nominated	
Georgia Film Critics Association	17 January 2012	Best Art Direction	Laurence Bennett	Nominated	
Golden Eagle Award	25 January 2013	Best Foreign Language Film	The Artist	Won	
Golden Globe Awards	15 January 2012	Best Motion Picture – Musical or Comedy	The Artist	Won	
Golden Globe Awards	15 January 2012	Best Actor – Motion Picture Musical or Comedy	Jean Dujardin	Won	
Golden Globe Awards	15 January 2012	Best Supporting Actress – Motion Picture	Bérénice Bejo	Nominated	
Golden Globe Awards	15 January 2012	Best Director – Motion Picture	Michel Hazanavicius	Nominated	
Golden Globe Awards	15 January 2012	Best Screenplay	Michel Hazanavicius	Nominated	
Golden Globe Awards	15 January 2012	Best Original Score	Ludovic Bource	Won	
Golden Trailer Awards	31 May 2012	Best Independent TV Spot	The Artist	Won	
Goya Awards	19 February 2012	Best European Film	Michel Hazanavicius	Won	
Grammy Awards	10 February 2013	Best Score Soundtrack For Visual Media	Ludovic Bource	Nominated	
Houston Film Critics Society	14 December 2011	Best Picture	The Artist	Nominated	
Houston Film Critics Society	14 December 2011	Best Director	Michel Hazanavicius	Nominated	
Houston Film Critics Society	14 December 2011	Best Actor	Jean Dujardin	Nominated	
Houston Film Critics Society	14 December 2011	Best Screenplay	Michel Hazanavicius	Nominated	
Houston Film Critics Society	14 December 2011	Best Cinematography	Guillaume Schiffman	Nominated	
Houston Film Critics Society	14 December 2011	Best Score	Ludovic Bource	Won	
Houston Film Critics Society	14 December 2011	Best Foreign Film	Michel Hazanavicius	Nominated	
Independent Spirit Awards	25 February 2012	Best Film	The Artist	Won	
Independent Spirit Awards	25 February 2012	Best Director	Michel Hazanavicius	Won	
Independent Spirit Awards	25 February 2012	Best Screenplay	Michel Hazanavicius	Nominated	
Independent Spirit Awards	25 February 2012	Best Actor	Jean Dujardin	Won	
Independent Spirit Awards	25 February 2012	Best Cinematography	Guillaume Schiffman	Won	
Leeds International Film Festival	21 November 2011	Official Selection Audience Award	The Artist	Won	
London Film Critics' Circle	19 January 2012	Film of the Year	The Artist	Won	
London Film Critics' Circle	19 January 2012	Actor of the Year	Jean Dujardin	Won	
London Film Critics' Circle	19 January 2012	Director of the Year	Michel Hazanavicius	Won	
London Film Critics' Circle	19 January 2012	Screenwriter of the Year	Michel Hazanavicius	Nominated	
Lumière Awards	13 January 2012	Best Film	The Artist	Won	
Lumière Awards	13 January 2012	Best Director	Michel Hazanavicius	Nominated	
Lumière Awards	13 January 2012	Best Actor	Jean Dujardin	Nominated	
Lumière Awards	13 January 2012	Best Actress	Bérénice Bejo	Won	
Lumière Awards	13 January 2012	Best Screenplay	Michel Hazanavicius	Nominated	
National Board of Review	4 February 2012	Top Ten Films	The Artist	Won	
National Society of Film Critics Awards	7 January 2012	Best Actor	Jean Dujardin	Runner-up	
New York Film Critics Circle	29 November 2011	Best Film	The Artist	Won	
New York Film Critics Circle	29 November 2011	Best Director	Michel Hazanavicius	Won	
New York Film Critics Circle	29 November 2011	Best Actor	Jean Dujardin	Runner-up	
New York Film Critics Online	11 December 2011	Best Picture	The Artist	Won	
New York Film Critics Online	11 December 2011	Best Director	Michel Hazanavicius	Won	
New York Film Critics Online	11 December 2011	Best Original Score	Ludovic Bource	Won	
Online Film Critics Society	2 January 2012	Best Picture	The Artist	Nominated	
Online Film Critics Society	2 January 2012	Best Director	Michel Hazanavicius	Nominated	
Online Film Critics Society	2 January 2012	Best Actor	Jean Dujardin	Nominated	
Online Film Critics Society	2 January 2012	Best Cinematography	Guillaume Schiffman	Nominated	
Producers Guild of America Awards	21 January 2012	Best Theatrical Motion Picture	Thomas Langmann	Won	
San Sebastián International Film Festival	25 September 2011	Audience Award	The Artist	Won	
Santa Barbara International Film Festival	4 February 2012	Cinema Vanguard Award	The Artist	Won	
San Diego Film Critics Society	14 December 2011	Best Film	The Artist	Won	
San Diego Film Critics Society	14 December 2011	Best Director	Michel Hazanavicius	Nominated	
San Diego Film Critics Society	14 December 2011	Best Actor	Jean Dujardin	Nominated	
San Diego Film Critics Society	14 December 2011	Best Supporting Actress	Bérénice Bejo	Nominated	
San Diego Film Critics Society	14 December 2011	Best Original Screenplay	Michel Hazanavicius	Nominated	
San Diego Film Critics Society	14 December 2011	Best Cinematography	Guillaume Schiffman	Nominated	
San Diego Film Critics Society	14 December 2011	Best Editing	Anne-Sophie Bion and Michel Hazanavicius	Nominated	
San Diego Film Critics Society	14 December 2011	Best Production Design	Laurence Bennett	Nominated	
San Diego Film Critics Society	14 December 2011	Best Score	Ludovic Bource	Nominated	
Satellite Awards	19 December 2011	Best Film	The Artist	Nominated	
Satellite Awards	19 December 2011	Best Director	Michel Hazanavicius	Nominated	
Satellite Awards	19 December 2011	Best Original Screenplay	Michel Hazanavicius	Nominated	
Satellite Awards	19 December 2011	Best Cinematography	Guillaume Schiffman	Nominated	
Satellite Awards	19 December 2011	Best Art Direction and Production Design	Laurence Bennett and Gregory S. Hooper	Won	
Satellite Awards	19 December 2011	Best Costume Design	Mark Bridges	Nominated	
Screen Actors Guild Awards	29 January 2012	Outstanding Performance by a Cast in a Motion Picture	Bérénice Bejo, James Cromwell, Jean Dujardin, John Goodman, and Penelope Ann Miller	Nominated	
Screen Actors Guild Awards	29 January 2012	Outstanding Performance by a Male Actor in a Leading Role	Jean Dujardin	Won	
Screen Actors Guild Awards	29 January 2012	Outstanding Performance by a Female Actor in a Supporting Role	Bérénice Bejo	Nominated	
St. Louis Gateway Film Critics Association	19 December 2011	Best Film	The Artist	Won	
St. Louis Gateway Film Critics Association	19 December 2011	Best Director	Michel Hazanavicius	Won	
St. Louis Gateway Film Critics Association	19 December 2011	Best Supporting Actress	Bérénice Bejo	Won	
St. Louis Gateway Film Critics Association	19 December 2011	Best Original Screenplay	Michel Hazanavicius	Won	
St. Louis Gateway Film Critics Association	19 December 2011	Best Music	Ludovic Bource	Won	
St. Louis Gateway Film Critics Association	19 December 2011	Special Merit (for best scene, cinematic technique or other memorable aspect or moment)	The Artist	Nominated	
Toronto Film Critics Association	14 December 2011	Best Picture	The Artist	Runner-up	
Toronto Film Critics Association	14 December 2011	Best Director	Michel Hazanavicius	Won	
Vancouver Film Critics Circle	9 January 2012	Best Film	The Artist	Won	
Vancouver Film Critics Circle	9 January 2012	Best Actor	Jean Dujardin	Nominated	
Vancouver Film Critics Circle	9 January 2012	Best Director	Michel Hazanavicius	Nominated	
Vancouver Film Critics Circle	9 January 2012	Best Screenplay	Michel Hazanavicius	Won	
Washington D.C. Area Film Critics Association	5 December 2011	Best Picture	The Artist	Won	
Washington D.C. Area Film Critics Association	5 December 2011	Best Director	Michel Hazanavicius	Nominated	
Washington D.C. Area Film Critics Association	5 December 2011	Best Actor	Jean Dujardin	Nominated	
Washington D.C. Area Film Critics Association	5 December 2011	Best Supporting Actress	Bérénice Bejo	Nominated	
Washington D.C. Area Film Critics Association	5 December 2011	Best Art Direction	Laurence Bennett and Gregory S. Hooper	Nominated	
Washington D.C. Area Film Critics Association	5 December 2011	Best Cinematography	Guillaume Schiffman	Nominated	
Washington D.C. Area Film Critics Association	5 December 2011	Best Original Score	Ludovic Bource	Won	
Women Film Critics Circle	19 December 2011	Best Actor	Jean Dujardin	Nominated	
Women Film Critics Circle	19 December 2011	Best Screen Couple	Jean Dujardin and Bérénice Bejo	Won	

== See also ==
- 2011 in film
- List of Academy Award records
