= 47th British Academy Film Awards =

1994 film awards ceremony

- Date: 15 April 1994
- Site: Theatre Royal, Drury Lane
- Hosted by: Sheena McDonald
- Produced by: Rock Oldham
- Directed by: Royston Mayoh

Highlights
- Best Film: Schindler's List
- Best British Film: Shadowlands
- Best Actor: Anthony Hopkins; The Remains of the Day
- Best Actress: Holly Hunter; The Piano
- Most awards: Schindler's List (7)
- Most nominations: Schindler's List (13)

The 47th British Academy Film Awards, more commonly known as the BAFTAs, took place on 15 April 1994 at the Theatre Royal, Drury Lane in London, honouring the best national and foreign films of 1993. Presented by the British Academy of Film and Television Arts, accolades were handed out for the best feature-length film and documentaries of any nationality that were screened at British cinemas in 1993. The ceremony was hosted by Sheena McDonald.

Steven Spielberg's Schindler's List won the award for Best Film (and previously won the Academy Award for Best Picture). The film also won the awards for Best Direction (Spielberg), Supporting Actor (Ralph Fiennes), Adapted Screenplay, Cinematography, Editing, and Original Music. Anthony Hopkins won the award for Best Actor (The Remains of the Day) and Holly Hunter was voted Best Actress for her role in The Piano while The Age of Innocence won one award— Best Supporting Actress (Miriam Margolyes). Additionally, Shadowlands was voted Best British Film of 1993.

== Winners and nominees ==
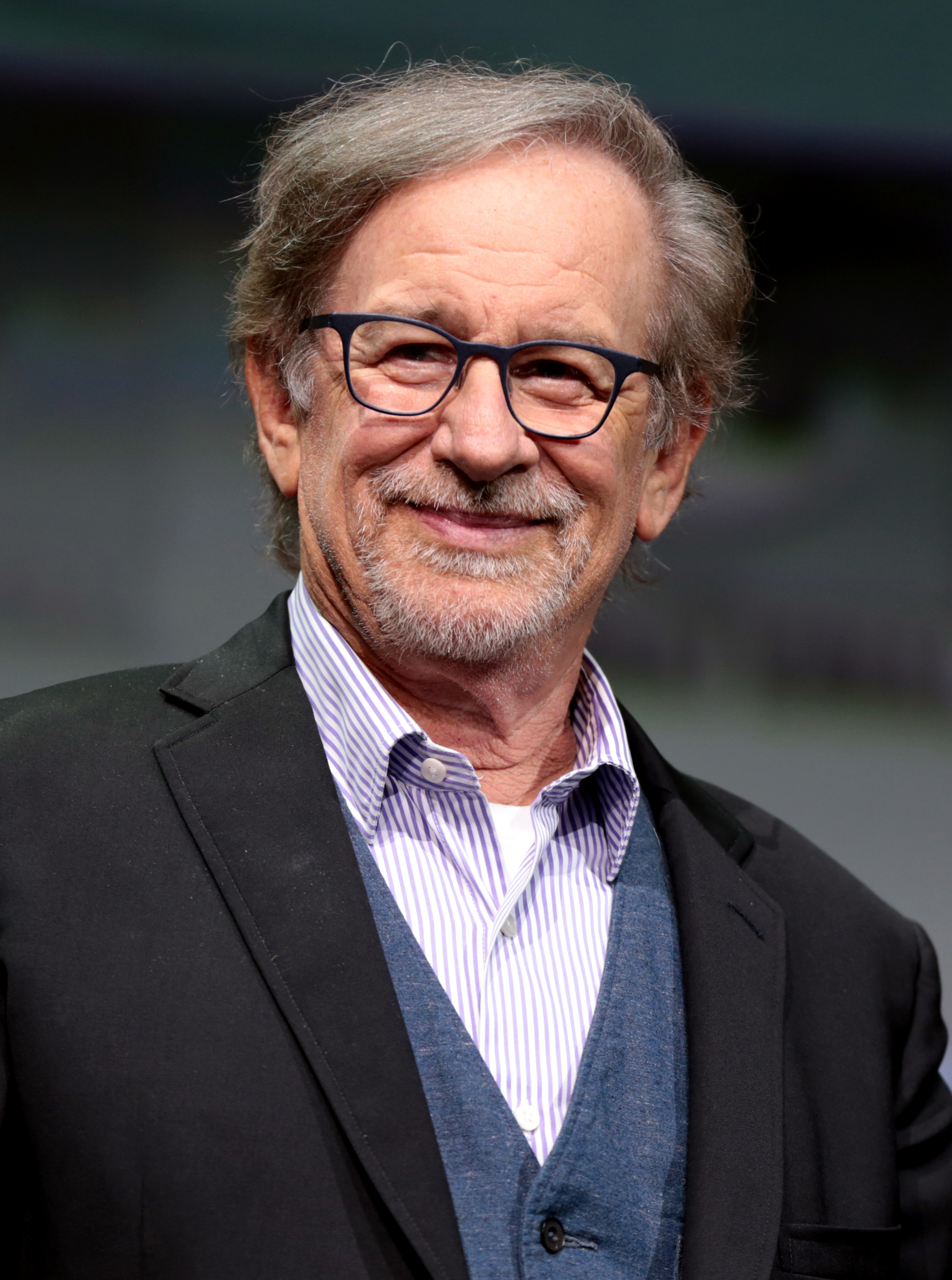
Steven Spielberg, Best Film co-winner and Best Director winner

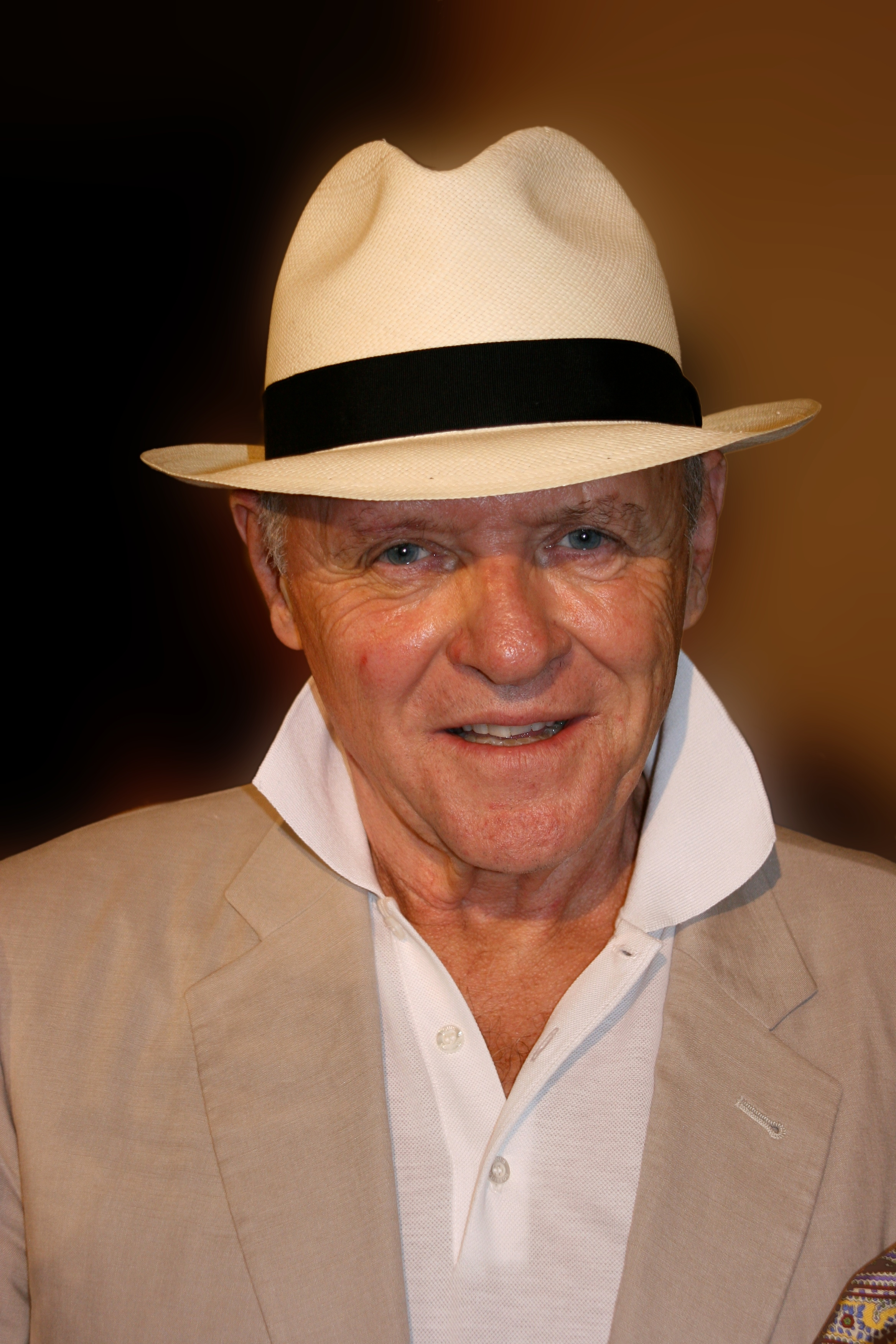
Anthony Hopkins, Best Actor winner

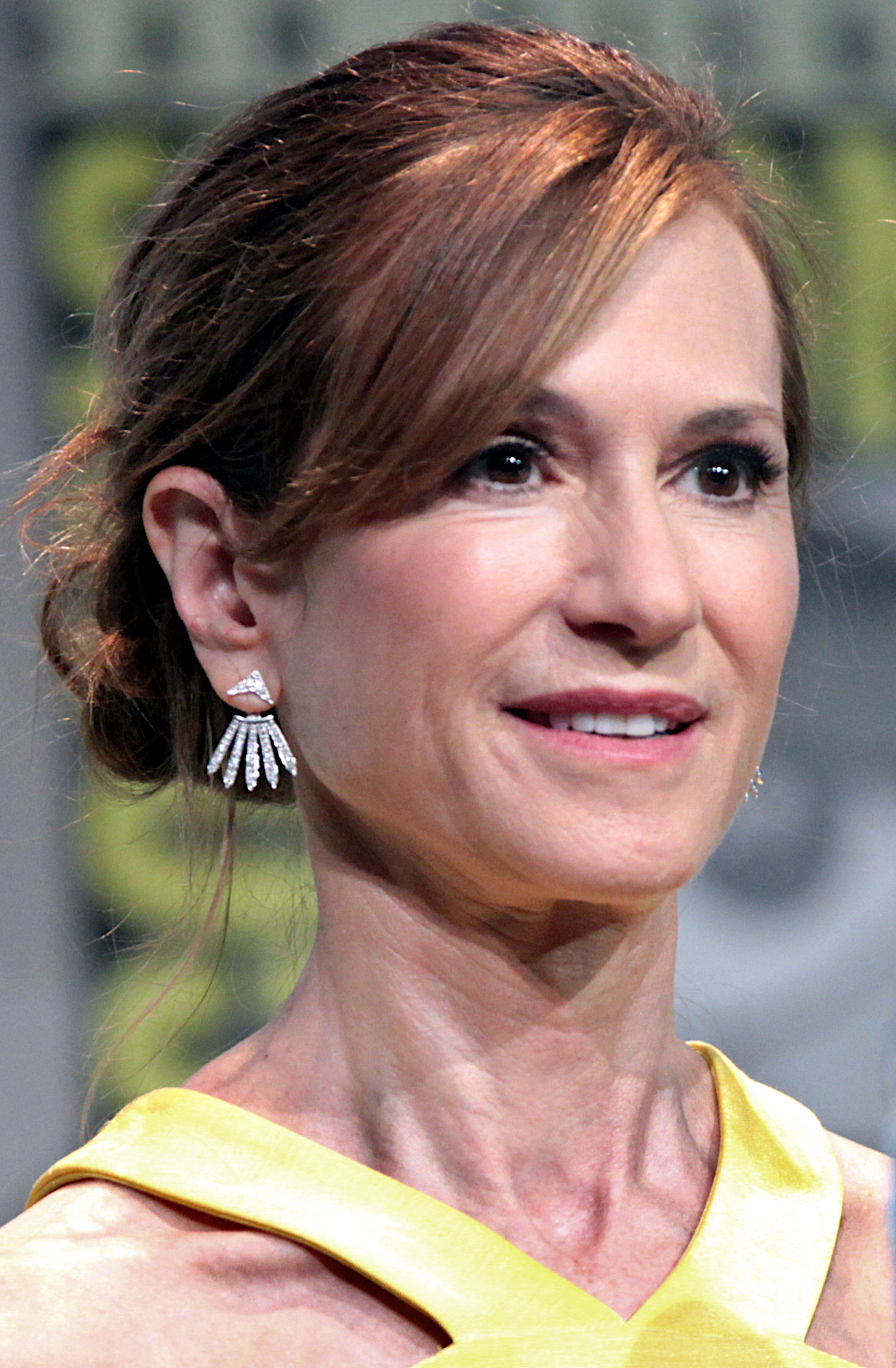
Holly Hunter, Best Actress winner

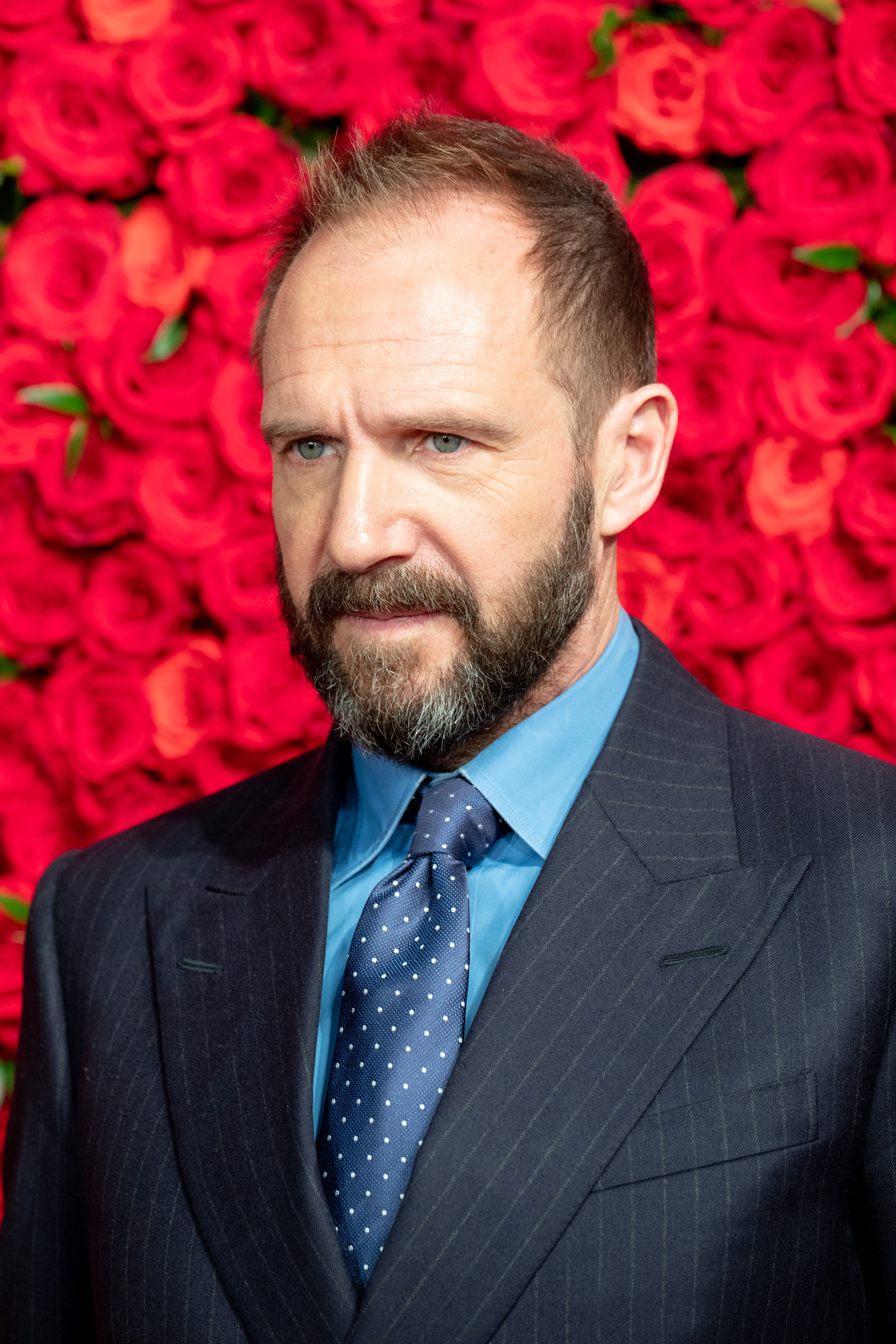
Ralph Fiennes, Best Supporting Actor winner

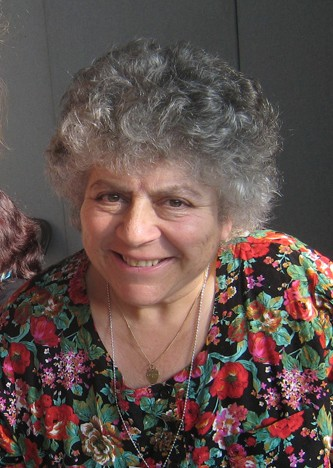
Miriam Margolyes, Best Supporting Actress winner

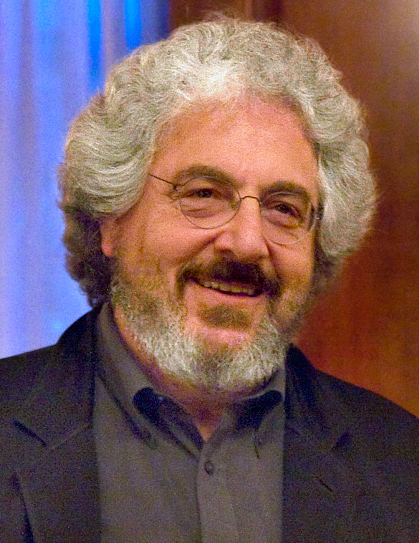
Harold Ramis, Best Original Screenplay co-winner

=== Outstanding British Contribution to Cinema ===
- **Ken Loach**

=== BAFTA Special Award ===
- **Richard Attenborough** and **Kodak**

=== BAFTA Special Award for Craft ===
- **Phyllis Dalton**

=== Awards ===
Winners are listed first and highlighted in boldface.

**Best Film**: **Schindler's List – Steven Spielberg, Gerald R. Molen and Branko Lustig**; The Piano – Jan Chapman and Jane Campion; The Remains of the Day – Ismail Merchant, Mike Nichols, John Calley and James Ivory; Shadowlands – Richard Attenborough and Brian Eastman	**Best Direction**: **Steven Spielberg – Schindler's List**; Richard Attenborough – Shadowlands; Jane Campion – The Piano; James Ivory – The Remains of the Day
**Best Actor in a Leading Role**: **Anthony Hopkins – The Remains of the Day as James Stevens**; Daniel Day-Lewis – In the Name of the Father as Gerry Conlon; Anthony Hopkins – Shadowlands as C. S. Lewis; Liam Neeson – Schindler's List as Oskar Schindler	**Best Actress in a Leading Role**: **Holly Hunter – The Piano as Ada McGrath**; Miranda Richardson – Tom & Viv as Vivienne Haigh-Wood Eliot; Emma Thompson – The Remains of the Day as Sarah Kenton; Debra Winger – Shadowlands as Joy Davidman
**Best Actor in a Supporting Role**: **Ralph Fiennes – Schindler's List as Amon Göth**; Tommy Lee Jones – The Fugitive as Deputy U.S. Marshal Samuel Gerard; Ben Kingsley – Schindler's List as Itzhak Stern; John Malkovich – In the Line of Fire as Mitch Leary	**Best Actress in a Supporting Role**: **Miriam Margolyes – The Age of Innocence as Mrs. Mingott**; Holly Hunter – The Firm as Tamara Hemphill; Winona Ryder – The Age of Innocence as May Welland; Maggie Smith – The Secret Garden as Medlock
**Best Original Screenplay**: **Groundhog Day – Danny Rubin and Harold Ramis**; In the Line of Fire – Jeff Maguire; The Piano – Jane Campion; Sleepless in Seattle – Nora Ephron, David S. Ward and Jeff Arch	**Best Adapted Screenplay**: **Schindler's List – Steven Zaillian**; In the Name of the Father – Terry George and Jim Sheridan; The Remains of the Day – Ruth Prawer Jhabvala; Scent of a Woman – Bo Goldman; Shadowlands – William Nicholson
**Best Cinematography**: **Schindler's List – Janusz Kamiński**; The Age of Innocence – Michael Ballhaus; The Piano – Stuart Dryburgh; The Remains of the Day – Tony Pierce-Roberts	**Best Costume Design**: **The Piano – Janet Patterson**; Bram Stoker's Dracula – Eiko Ishioka; Much Ado About Nothing – Phyllis Dalton; Orlando – Sandy Powell; Schindler's List – Anna B. Sheppard
**Best Editing**: **Schindler's List – Michael Kahn**; The Fugitive – Dennis Virkler, David Finfer, Dean Goodhill, Don Brochu, Richard Nord and Dov Hoenig; In the Line of Fire – Anne V. Coates; The Piano – Veronika Jenet	**Best Makeup and Hair**: **Orlando – Morag Ross**; Addams Family Values – Kevin Haney, Katherine James, Fred C. Blau Jr. and Fern Buchner; Bram Stoker's Dracula – Greg Cannom, Michèle Burke and Matthew W. Mungle; Schindler's List – Christina Smith, Matthew W. Mungle, Waldemar Pokromski and Pauline Heys
**Best Original Music**: **Schindler's List – John Williams**; Aladdin – Alan Menken; The Piano – Michael Nyman; Sleepless in Seattle – Marc Shaiman	**Best Production Design**: **The Piano – Andrew McAlpine**; The Age of Innocence – Dante Ferretti; Bram Stoker's Dracula – Thomas E. Sanders; Schindler's List – Allan Starski
**Best Sound**: **The Fugitive – John Leveque, Bruce Stambler, Becky Sullivan, Scott D. Smith, Donald O. Mitchell, Michael Herbick and Frank A. Montaño**; Jurassic Park – Richard Hymns, Ron Judkins, Gary Summers, Gary Rydstrom and Shawn Murphy; The Piano – Lee Smith, Tony Johnson and Gethin Creagh; Schindler's List – Charles L. Campbell, Louis Edemann, Robert Jackson, Ron Judkins, Andy Nelson, Steve Pederson and Scott Millan	**Best Special Visual Effects**: **Jurassic Park – Dennis Muren, Stan Winston, Phil Tippett and Michael Lantieri**; Aladdin – Don Paul and Steve Goldberg; Bram Stoker's Dracula – Roman Coppola, Gary Gutierrez, Michael Lantieri and Gene Warren Jr.; The Fugitive – William Mesa and Roy Arbogast
**Outstanding British Film**: **Shadowlands – Richard Attenborough and Brian Eastman**; Naked – Mike Leigh and Simon Channing Williams; Raining Stones – Sally Hibbin and Ken Loach; Tom & Viv – Marc Samuelson, Harvey Kass, Peter Samuelson and Brian Gilbert	**Best Film Not in the English Language**: **Farewell My Concubine – Hsu Feng and Chen Kaige**; A Heart in Winter – Jean-Louis Livi, Philippe Carcassonne and Claude Sautet; Indochine – Eric Heumann and Régis Wargnier; Like Water for Chocolate – Alfonso Arau
**Best Short Animation**: **The Wrong Trousers – Chris Moll and Nick Park**; Bob's Birthday – David Fine and Alison Snowden; Britannia – David Parker and Joanna Quinn; The Village – Pam Dennis and Mark Baker	**Best Short Film**: **Franz Kafka's It's a Wonderful Life – Ruth Kenley-Letts and Peter Capaldi**; One Night Stand – Georgia Masters and Bill Britten; A Small Deposit – Paul Holmes and Eleanor Yule; Syrup – Anita Overland and Paul Unwin

== Statistics ==
Films that received multiple nominations
Nominations	Film
13	Schindler's List
10	The Piano
6	The Remains of the Day
6	Shadowlands
4	The Age of Innocence
4	Bram Stoker's Dracula
4	The Fugitive
3	In the Line of Fire
2	Aladdin
2	In the Name of the Father
2	Jurassic Park
2	Orlando
2	Sleepless in Seattle
2	Tom & Viv

Films that received multiple awards
Awards	Film
7	Schindler's List
3	The Piano

== See also ==
- 66th Academy Awards
- 19th César Awards
- 46th Directors Guild of America Awards
- 7th European Film Awards
- 51st Golden Globe Awards
- 5th Golden Laurel Awards
- 14th Golden Raspberry Awards
- 8th Goya Awards
- 9th Independent Spirit Awards
- 20th Saturn Awards
- 46th Writers Guild of America Awards
