= 45th British Academy Film Awards =

1992 film awards ceremony

- Date: 22 March 1992
- Site: Grosvenor House Hotel
- Hosted by: Michael Aspel

Highlights
- Best Film: The Commitments
- Best Actor: Anthony Hopkins; The Silence of the Lambs
- Best Actress: Jodie Foster; The Silence of the Lambs
- Most awards: The Commitments and Cyrano de Bergerac (4)
- Most nominations: Dances with Wolves and The Silence of the Lambs (9)

The 45th British Academy Film Awards, more commonly known as the BAFTAs, took place on 22 March 1992 at the Grosvenor House Hotel in London, honouring the best national and foreign films of 1991. Presented by the British Academy of Film and Television Arts, accolades were handed out for the best feature-length film and documentaries of any nationality that were screened at British cinemas in 1991.

Alan Parker's The Commitments won the awards for Best Film, Director, Adapted Screenplay and Editing. The Silence of the Lambs won the awards for Best Actor (Anthony Hopkins) and Actress (Jodie Foster). It went on to win the same Academy Awards. Alan Rickman was voted Best Actor in a Supporting Role for his work in Robin Hood: Prince of Thieves. Kate Nelligan (Frankie and Johnny) won the award for Best Supporting Actress.

The ceremony was hosted by Michael Aspel.

== Winners and nominees ==
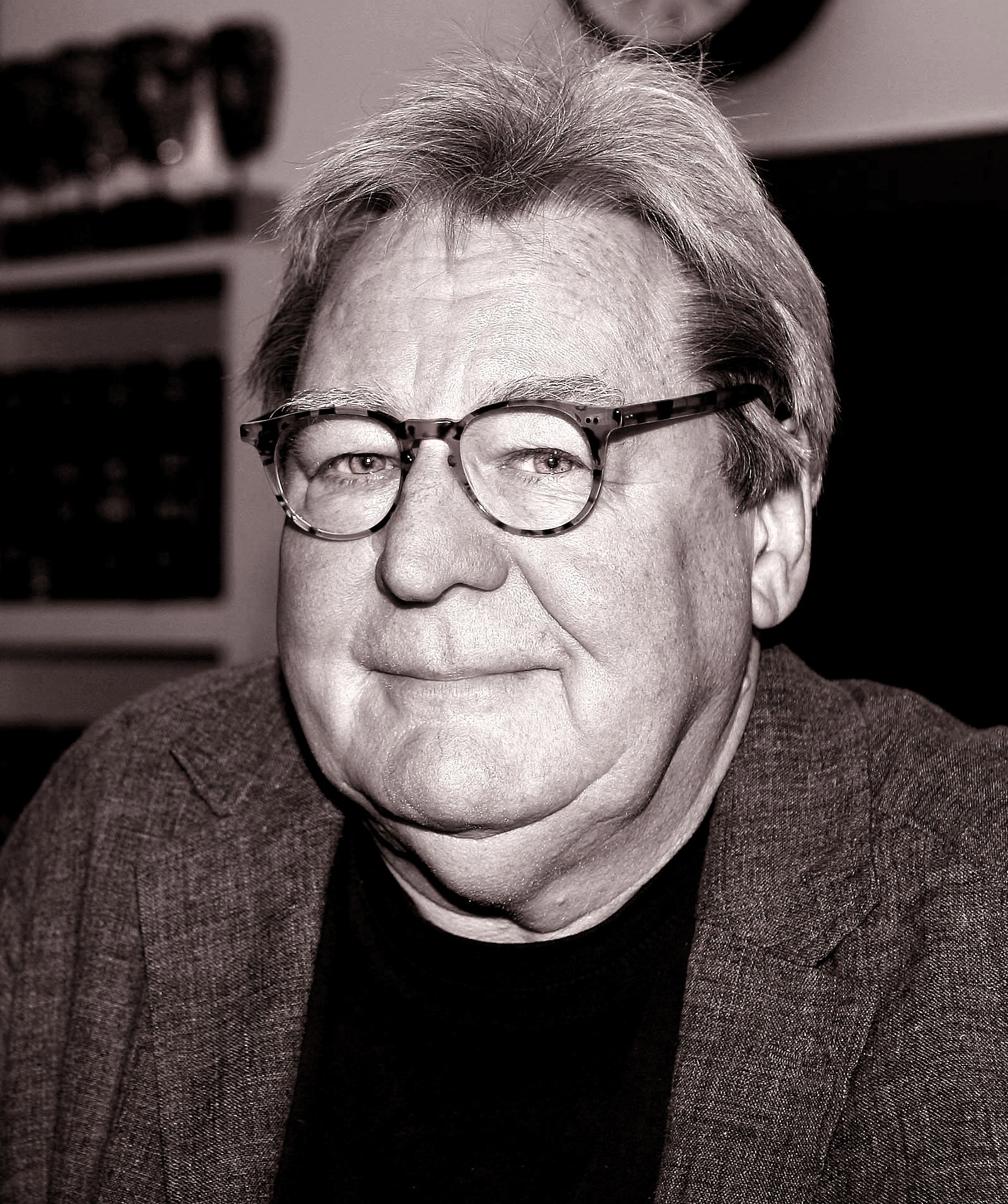
Alan Parker, Best Director winner

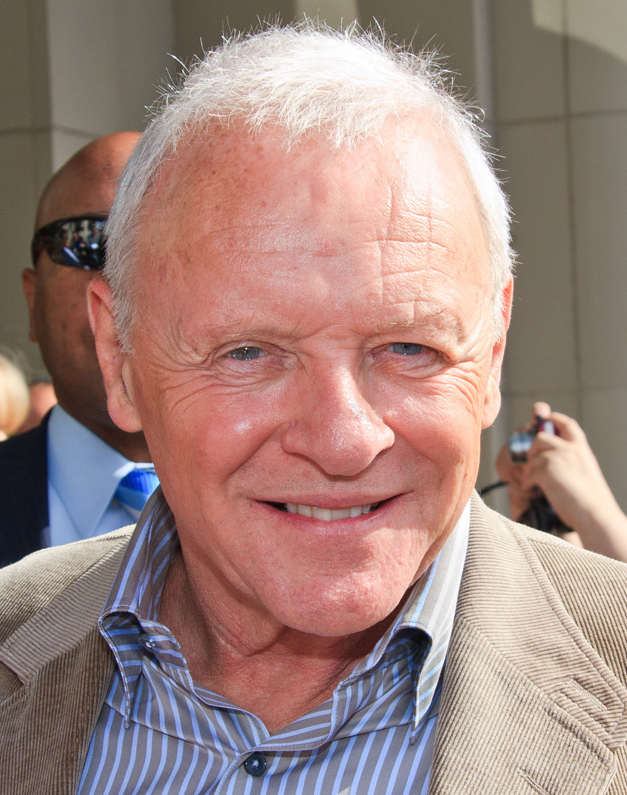
Anthony Hopkins, Best Actor winner

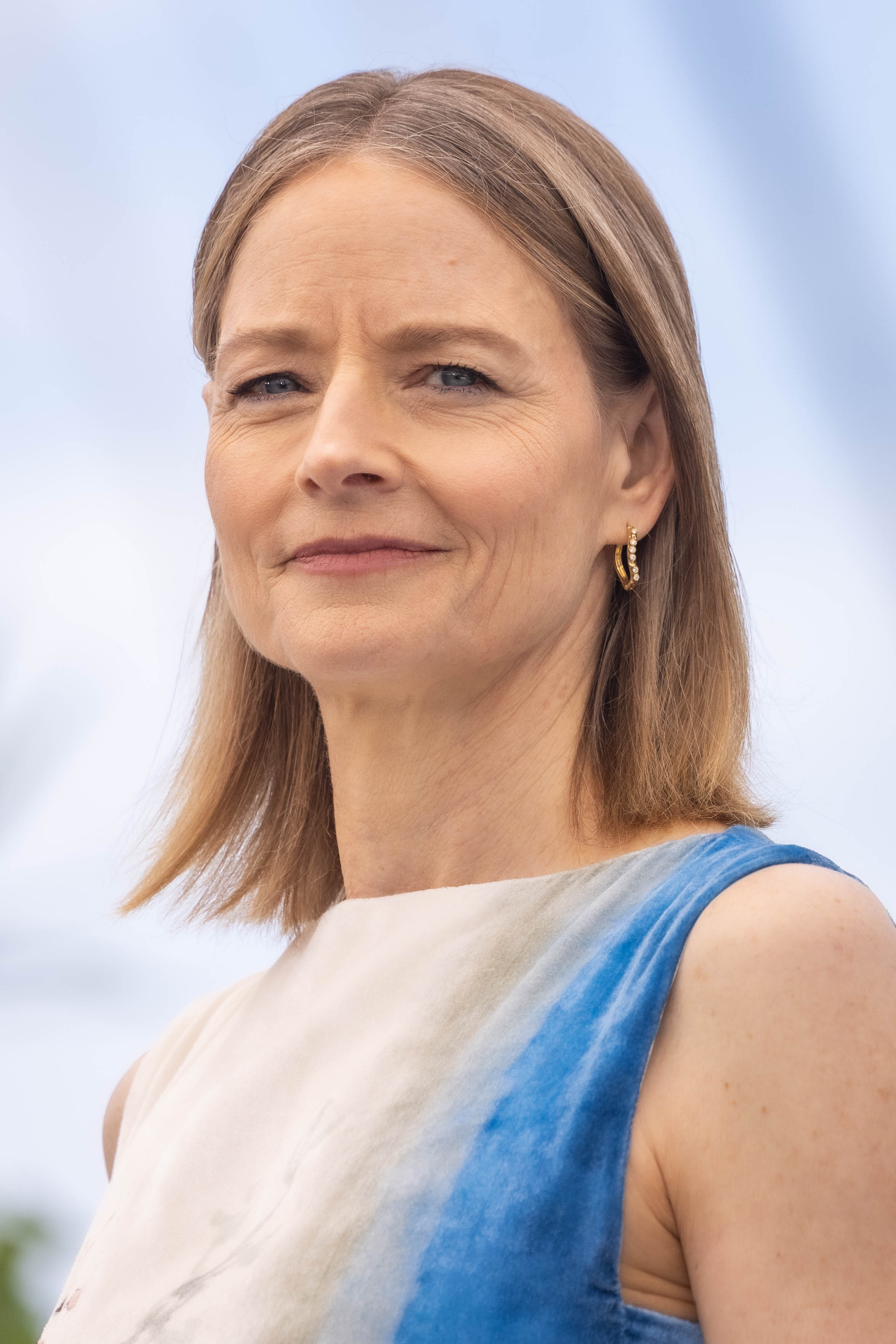
Jodie Foster, Best Actress winner

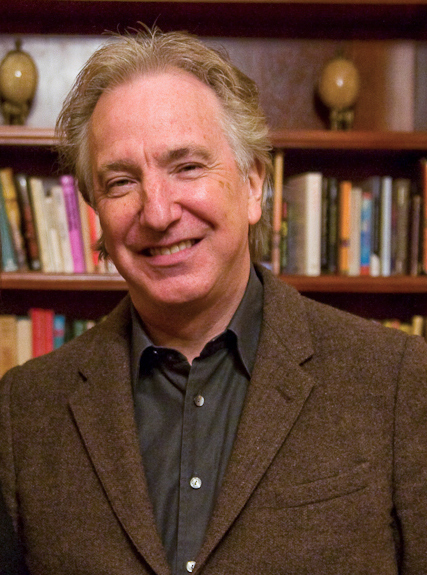
Alan Rickman, Best Supporting Actor winner

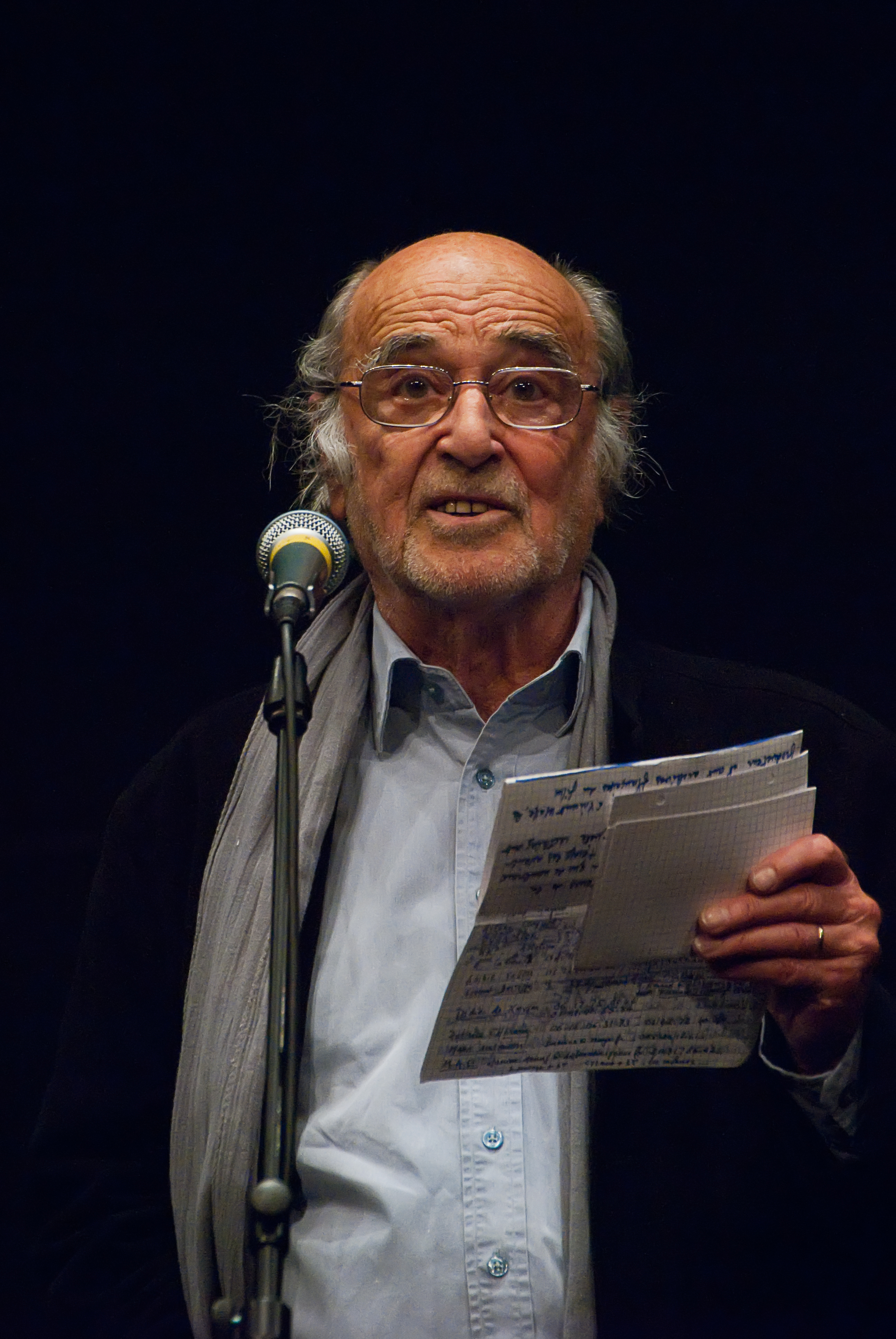
Pierre Lhomme, Best Cinematography winner

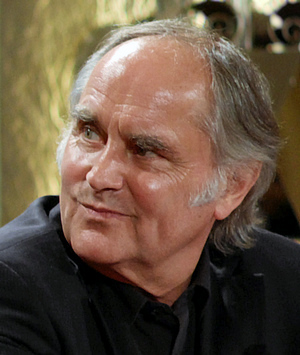
Michael Verhoeven, Best Film Not in the English Language winner

=== BAFTA Fellowship ===
- **John Gielgud**

=== Outstanding British Contribution to Cinema ===
- **Derek Jarman**

=== BAFTA Special Award ===
- **Mitzi Cunliffe**, **Audrey Hepburn** and **Ridley Scott**

=== BAFTA Special Award for Craft ===
- **Tom Smith**

=== Awards ===
Winners are listed first and highlighted in boldface.

**Best Film**: **The Commitments – Roger Randall-Cutler, Lynda Myles and Alan Parker**; Dances with Wolves – Kevin Costner and Jim Wilson; The Silence of the Lambs – Edward Saxon, Kenneth Utt, Ron Bozman and Jonathan Demme; Thelma & Louise – Mimi Polk Gitlin, Ridley Scott	**Best Direction**: **Alan Parker – The Commitments**; Kevin Costner – Dances with Wolves; Jonathan Demme – The Silence of the Lambs; Ridley Scott – Thelma & Louise
**Best Actor in a Leading Role**: **Anthony Hopkins – The Silence of the Lambs as Hannibal Lecter**; Kevin Costner – Dances with Wolves as John Dunbar; Gérard Depardieu – Cyrano de Bergerac as Cyrano de Bergerac; Alan Rickman – Truly, Madly, Deeply as Jamie	**Best Actress in a Leading Role**: **Jodie Foster – The Silence of the Lambs as Clarice Starling**; Geena Davis – Thelma & Louise as Thelma Yvonne Dickinson; Susan Sarandon – Thelma & Louise as Louise Elizabeth Sawyer; Juliet Stevenson – Truly, Madly, Deeply as Nina
**Best Actor in a Supporting Role**: **Alan Rickman – Robin Hood: Prince of Thieves as Sheriff of Nottingham**; Alan Bates – Hamlet as King Claudius; Derek Jacobi – Dead Again as Franklyn Madson; Andrew Strong – The Commitments as Deco Cuffe	**Best Actress in a Supporting Role**: **Kate Nelligan – Frankie and Johnny as Cora**; Annette Bening – The Grifters as Myra Langtry; Amanda Plummer – The Fisher King as Lydia Sinclair; Julie Walters – Stepping Out as Vera
**Best Original Screenplay**: **Truly, Madly, Deeply – Anthony Minghella**; The Fisher King – Richard LaGravenese; Green Card – Peter Weir; Thelma & Louise – Callie Khouri	**Best Adapted Screenplay**: **The Commitments – Dick Clement, Ian La Frenais and Roddy Doyle**; Cyrano de Bergerac – Jean-Paul Rappeneau and Jean-Claude Carrière; Dances with Wolves – Michael Blake; The Silence of the Lambs – Ted Tally
**Best Cinematography**: **Cyrano de Bergerac – Pierre Lhomme**; Dances with Wolves – Dean Semler; The Silence of the Lambs – Tak Fujimoto; Thelma & Louise – Adrian Biddle	**Best Costume Design**: **Cyrano de Bergerac – Franca Squarciapino**; Edward Scissorhands – Colleen Atwood; Robin Hood: Prince of Thieves – John Bloomfield; Valmont – Theodor Pištěk
**Best Editing**: **The Commitments – Gerry Hambling**; Dances with Wolves – Neil Travis; The Silence of the Lambs – Craig McKay; Thelma & Louise – Thom Noble	**Best Makeup and Hair**: **Cyrano de Bergerac – Jean-Pierre Eychenne and Michèle Burke**; The Addams Family – Fern Buchner, Katherine James and Kevin Haney; Dances with Wolves – Frank Carrisosa; Edward Scissorhands – Ve Neill
**Best Original Music**: **Cyrano de Bergerac – Jean-Claude Petit**; Dances with Wolves – John Barry; The Silence of the Lambs – Howard Shore; Thelma & Louise – Hans Zimmer	**Best Production Design**: **Edward Scissorhands – Bo Welch**; The Addams Family – Richard Macdonald; Cyrano de Bergerac – Ezio Frigerio; Terminator 2: Judgment Day – Joseph Nemec III
**Best Sound**: **Terminator 2: Judgment Day – Lee Orloff, Tom Johnson, Gary Rydstrom and Gary Summers**; The Commitments – Clive Winter, Eddy Joseph, Andy Nelson, Tom Perry and Steve Pederson; Dances with Wolves – Jeffrey Perkins, Bill W. Benton, Gregory H. Watkins and Russell Williams II; The Silence of the Lambs – Skip Lievsay, Chris Newman and Tom Fleischman	**Best Special Visual Effects**: **Terminator 2: Judgment Day – Stan Winston, Dennis Muren, Gene Warren Jr. and Robert Skotak**; Backdraft – Allen Hall, Scott Farrar, Clay Pinney and Mikael Salomon; Edward Scissorhands – Stan Winston; Prospero's Books – Frans Wamelink, Eve Ramboz and Masao Yamaguchi
**Best Short Film**: **The Harmfulness of Tobacco – Barry Palin and Nick Hamm**; Breath of Life – Navin Thapar; Man Descending – Neil Grieve and Ray Lorenz; Trauma – Gerhard Johannes Rekel	**Best Short Animation**: **Balloon – Ken Lidster**; Adam – Chris Moll and Peter Lord; Anamorphosis – Keith Griffiths, Stephen Quay and Timothy Quay; Touch – Debra Smith
**Best Film Not in the English Language**: **The Nasty Girl – Michael Verhoeven**; Cyrano de Bergerac – Rene Cleitman, Michel Seydoux and Jean-Paul Rappeneau; The Hairdresser's Husband – Thierry de Ganay and Patrice Leconte; Toto the Hero – Pierre Drouot, Dany Geys and Jaco Van Dormael

== Statistics ==
Films that received multiple nominations
Nominations	Film
9	Dances with Wolves
9	The Silence of the Lambs
8	Cyrano de Bergerac
8	Thelma & Louise
6	The Commitments
4	Edward Scissorhands
3	Terminator 2: Judgment Day
3	Truly, Madly, Deeply
2	The Addams Family
2	The Fisher King
2	Robin Hood: Prince of Thieves

Films that received multiple awards
Awards	Film
4	The Commitments
4	Cyrano de Bergerac
2	The Silence of the Lambs
2	Terminator 2: Judgment Day

== See also ==
- 64th Academy Awards
- 17th César Awards
- 44th Directors Guild of America Awards
- 5th European Film Awards
- 49th Golden Globe Awards
- 3rd Golden Laurel Awards
- 12th Golden Raspberry Awards
- 6th Goya Awards
- 7th Independent Spirit Awards
- 18th Saturn Awards
- 44th Writers Guild of America Awards
