= Haneen Koraz =

Palestinian animator

Haneen Koraz (Arabic: حنين كُرّاز, born 1985 or 1986) is a Palestinian stop motion animation filmmaker and educator.

== Life and career ==
Koraz was born in 1985 or 1986.

In 2012, she began offering animation workshops for school children in Gaza together with co-animator Noor Abdul Jawad. Before the start of the Gaza genocide in October 2023, they planned to expand the reach of their workshops, aiming to include programming for children in schools in the West Bank and Egypt. Koraz regularly participated in the Theater Days festival and produced animation films on themes of children's and women's rights. She received grants from the Palestinian Ministry of Culture and the Institut Français.

In 2021, Koraz received media attention for a project teaching animation to girls with hearing disabilities in Gaza. Together with the participants, the films were produced covering the daily life experiences of women with hearing disabilities during the COVID-19 pandemic.

After the start of the genocide in 2023, Koraz was internally displaced from Gaza City by the Israel Defense Forces to Deir al-Balah. She and Jawad started offering animation workshops for children and women in tents in local refugee camps, with the goal of empowering residents with the opportunity to express themselves artistically, rather than as victims.

In August 2024, Koraz and her team were displaced again and continued their work in another refugee camp.

The works creating in Koraz's workshops have been shown at film festivals and screenings around the world, sometimes combined with fundraising for her work, for example in Norway, Germany, at the Kaboom Animation Festival in the Netherlands, L'Alternativa in Barcelona or 24Frame Future Film Fest in Italy.

== Legacy ==
Koraz won the Al-Taawoun Award for Excellence in the Cultural Sector in 2022 in Lebanon for Studio Without Voices, a project in which she and her team produced animated films with girls with disabilities. She also placed third in the Partners Short Film Competition for a film produced for the Gaza Municipality, and third in the One Minute Film Competition organized by the Sawa Foundation.

In 2025, British animator Joanna Quinn dedicated the Honorary Cristal she received at the Annecy International Animation Film Festival to Koraz. Quinn, together with other animation filmmakers, started the collective Animation Community for Palestine (ac4pal) in February 2025 to support Koraz' work, organising fundraising screenings of the films she produces together with children during the Gaza genocide.

== Selected filmography ==
- Grandmother Wore Us Out (2024)
