= Affairs of the Art =

- Poster
- Directed by: Joanna Quinn
- Written by: Les Mills
- Produced by: Les Mills; Michael Fukushima
- Starring: Menna Trussler; Brendan Charleson; Joanna Quinn; Mali Ann Rees
- Edited by: Mia Rose Goddard
- Music by: Benjamin Talbott
- Production companies: Beryl Productions International Ltd. The National Film Board of Canada
- Distributed by: The Animation Showcase
- Release date: January 31, 2021 (Clermont-Ferrand International Short Film Festival)
- Running time: 16 minutes
- Countries: United Kingdom; Canada
- Language: English

Affairs of the Art is a 2021 British-Canadian traditional animation short film directed by Joanna Quinn and written by Les Mills. Quinn also co-stars as the voice of Beverly.

The film has been screened at Film Festivals worldwide since February 2021 including Palm Springs ShortFest in the US, winning 26 International Awards including prizes in Clermont Ferrand International Short Film Festival and Annecy International Animation Film Festival. It has been nominated for the Academy Award for Best Animated Short Film for the 94th Academy Awards and nominated for BAFTA Award for Best Short Animation. The short was part of the world touring screening The Animation Showcase 2021.

The short film follows the character of Beryl and her eccentric family. Beryl, the working-class heroine, first appeared in the 1987 animated short film Girls Night Out, Body Beautiful (1990) and Dreams & Desires: Family Ties (2006). Affairs of the Art focuses on Beryl and her family's fixations and Beryl's own obsession with drawing and her determination to become an artiste of note.

The film is available to watch on the NFB's official website and its and the New Yorker's respective YouTube channels.

== Cast ==
- Menna Trussler as Beryl
- Brendan Charleson as Ifor/Colin/Lenin/Interviewer
- Joanna Quinn as Beverly
- Mali Ann Rees as Mum/Edie

== Production ==
The film is co-created between Joanna Quinn and Les Mills. Quinn is the film's director, storyboard artist and lead animator and Mills wrote the screen play, did the colour design and produced the film. It is their first new film featuring the lead character of Beryl since 2007. They began planning another Beryl film straight after their last film Dreams & Desires: Family Ties, but it took 15 years before Beryl returned to the screen in a new film mainly because of major commitments to producing many TV commercials in the intervening years. The 16-minute-film was traditionally animated on a lightbox and took more than 24000 hand drawn frames (fps) to produce. The animation drawings were scanned into the computer, coloured in TVPaint and finally composited in After Effects. In this film there's a lot of lip sync, with a focus on breaking down the patterns of the lips movements.

== Accolades ==
Since its launch, the film has been selected in more than 65 festival selections around the world:

Year	Ceremony	Award/Category	Status
2021	Clermont Ferrand International Short Film Festival	Best animation film	Won
2021	Annecy International Animation	Special Distinction for Direction	Won
2021	Kaboom Animation Festival	Best Short Film	Won
2021	Los Angeles Animation Festival	Best director	Won
2021	Aspen Shortsfest	Jury Award in the Comedy category	Won
2021	Palm Springs Shortsfest	Best Animation Short Film	Nominated
2021	Insomnia Animation Festival	The Profnastil Prize for Best International Short Animation	Won
2021	Fantoche Animation Festival	International Audience Prize	Won
2021	Valladolid International Film Festival	Golden Spike for Best Short Film	Won
2021	Chicago International Film Festival	Gold Hugo for Best Animated Short Film	Won
2021	BAFTA	BAFTA Award for Best British Short Animation	Nominated
2021	Academy Awards	Academy Award for Best Animated Short Film	Nominated
