= Famous Fred =

- Directed by: Joanna Quinn
- Written by: Joanna Quinn
- Based on: Fred by Posy Simmonds
- Produced by: John Coates; Catrin Unwin
- Edited by: Jane Murrell; William Oswald
- Music by: Danny Chang
- Production company: TVC London
- Distributed by: Channel 4
- Release date: 24 December 1996 (United Kingdom)
- Running time: 25 minutes
- Country: United Kingdom
- Language: English

Famous Fred is a 1996 British animated short film written and directed by Joanna Quinn. It is based on the children's book Fred by Posy Simmonds.

== Plot ==
Fred, the pet cat of young siblings Sophie and Nick, has recently died. Word gets around in the street and the children and adults remember Fred, who took every opportunity to sleep. Together with their parents, Sophie and Nick bury Fred in the courtyard and paint him a simple gravestone.

At night, Sophie and Nick are woken by a noise outside their window. Upon sneaking downstairs, they find a neighbour's cat, Ginger, standing outside in a tailcoat and top hat, looking at his wristwatch. Sophie and Nick crawl out the house through the catflap and approach Ginger, who suddenly speaks to them in English and inquires whether they knew 'the deceased'. Realising he means Fred, Sophie and Nick explain they were Fred's owners. Ginger is delighted to learn they owned 'the most famous cat in the world', which confuses them. They then realise the whole courtyard is filled with cats and tomcats, who have gathered for a funeral service in honour of Fred. When the children explain that Fred couldn't possibly have been famous because he had literally done nothing, the cats reveal the truth: by night, Fred was a famous singer and rock star in the feline world.

Kenneth, the guinea pig of the two children, suddenly pushes himself through the catflap. In jeans and a leather jacket, he introduces himself to Sophie and Nick as Fred's former manager. After a cat named Ruby leads a gospel choir in performing a song in Fred's memory, the cats unveil a grand headstone over Fred's grave with the name FAMOUS FRED, before laying flowers and wreaths. Kenneth then gathers the children and cats to tell Fred's story.

Fred came to Sophie and Nick as a birthday present for the mother of the family. By chance, he was introduced to rock and roll after accidentally turning on a vinyl player and speakers in the living room, and secretly practised singing in the garden shed. Kenneth, who had recently left the Royal Opera House at the time, overheard him and decided to take over Fred's training. After being 'found' by Sophie and Nick's parents and adopted as a pet, Kenneth introduced himself to Fred (who initially tried to eat him) and offered to be his manager. At night, Kenneth made costumes for Fred and taught him to dance and perform. Soon Fred could perform in public and the crowd of feline fans grew continuously.

When the backyards were no longer enough for Fred's audience, they both left the family to go on a world tour, with Sophie and Nick desperately searching the streets to find their missing pets. Fred's dissolute lifestyle, however, increasingly caused diseases, reflected in ever higher veterinary bills. In the end, Fred fell ill with 'cat flu' and died shortly after returning to the family.

In the present, Sophie and Nick are saddened that they never heard Fred sing, with Kenneth blaming himself for Fred's death. Ginger reveals he made a secret recording of Fred's final song on tape (without Kenneth's permission), and the funeral service moves to Sophie's and Nick's house, where the children and cats dance to Fred's music and empty the fridge. When dawn falls, everyone disappears and Sophie and Nick are also sent to bed by Kenneth, who laboriously cleans the kitchen before retiring upstairs himself.

The next morning, Sophie and Nick's parents are left confused by the previously-filled refrigerator being suddenly empty, along with all the flowers from the garden plants missing. Leading them down the garden, the children reveal Fred's still-decorated headstone to their amazed and delighted parents, who assume they made it themselves. Sophie nods in agreement, with an initially confused Nick also deciding not to reveal the truth.

Meanwhile, Kenneth is sitting in his hutch upstairs listing the different cat lives that Fred had lost in various incidents over the years. He realises that the cat flu was only Fred's eighth consumed cat life. Since every cat has nine lives, Kenneth exclaims that Fred still has one life left, and calls out for his whereabouts.

In the garden, Fred appears from behind his headstone, and secretly creeps away with a smile.

== Production ==
Famous Fred is based on Posy Simmonds's children's book Fred. The film was released on Christmas Eve 1996 on Channel 4. Lenny Henry sings various songs in the film as Fred, including the title One Last Song composed by Danny Cheng and written by Rob Reed and Nigel Crowle.

== Cast ==
Role	Actors
Fred	Lenny Henry
Kenneth	Tom Courtenay
Ginger	David Robb
Sophie	Jessica Lynam
Nick	Daniel John Barker
Father	Matthew Marsh
Mother	Joanna Quinn
Ruby	Ruby Turner

== Awards ==
Famous Fred was nominated for BAFTA Award for Best Short Animation in 1997 and won the British Academy Children's Award for Animation the same year.

The film was also nominated for the Oscar for Best Animated Short Film in 1998, but lost the award to Geri's Game.
