= Monsters (2004 film) =

- Directed by: Robert Morgan
- Written by: Robert Morgan
- Produced by: Sylvie Bringas
- Starring: Jack Daly; Jessica Ashworth
- Cinematography: Marcus Waterloo
- Edited by: Nicolas Chaudeurge
- Music by: Tara Creme
- Production companies: Film Four; UK Film Council
- Release date: 2004
- Running time: 17 minutes
- Country: United Kingdom
- Language: English

Monsters is a 2004 British short horror film written and directed by Robert Morgan. He has described the film as semi-autobiographical, as he based the story's main concept on fantasies he had during childhood.

The film was screened at various film festivals and was nominated for the Golden Melies for Best Short Horror Film of the Year.

== Synopsis ==
The short centers on the sibling relationship between Stan and his teenage sister Mary. The two frequently fight and Mary sees him as an annoying, strange little brother. One day Stan sees a goose head in the garden and when he goes to tell his mother, notices a nearby mental hospital. Mary delights in telling him that the hospital is home to sick, crazed individuals and that he would one day belong there as well. Later that night the two fight again when Mary discovers that Stan has put the animal head in her box of Tampax. The fight culminates in the two falling down the stairs, at which point Mary threatens to murder him.

Later Stan has a nightmare about Mary coming for him and then imagines that a mental patient has escaped the hospital and murdered his mother and Mary after ransacking the house. Some time later Mary wakes and discovers that Stan is gone. Concerned, she goes to look for him and discovers him outside near the body of a goose (it is unclear if it is the same goose as before or if Stan was the one to kill it). Mary helps him bury the goose. The two silently look at one another before returning home.

== Cast ==
- Jack Daly as Stan
- Jessica Ashworth as Mary
- Samantha Lynch as Mum
- Barry Lee-Thomas as Dad
- Philip Clayton-Smith as Madman

== Production ==
Morgan based the concept of Monsters upon an idea he had as a child. Growing up, he lived near Broadmoor Hospital, causing him to fantasize about what would happen if a homicidal patient were to have escaped into the nearby forest. In interviews with Film Threat and the BBC, Morgan noted that the sibling rivalry and animosity was based on his interactions with his sister and that he would occasionally imagine that the patient would rescue him from her.

After writing the script Morgan sent it to Cinema Extreme in hopes of receiving assistance. He was granted an interview and during the review process they gave him advice on development and about the look of the film. Morgan developed a storyboard to better communicate the story to the team, which eventually granted him the funding. Due to the film's low budget, Morgan had a limited set of locations he could choose from and the house didn't turn out the way he wanted it to be. As a result, he expressed interest in redoing the film.

== Release ==
Monsters was screened at various film festivals including the Edinburgh International Film Festival and the Stockholm International Film Festival. It was nominated for the Golden Melies for Best Short Horror Film of the Year.

== Reception ==
Reviewing the film in 2005, Jeremy Knox of Film Threat wrote that "From the first frame to the last Monsters oozes with childhood fear. To watch it is to be taken back when you were five and everything seemed alive with danger and mystery. That he is able to just magically create this sort of mood out of thin air shows that he’s truly gifted". In an interview with Robert Morgan in 2012, Knox revealed that his review for Monsters "is the only review I’ve done that I sort of half regret because I don’t think I really got it the first time. I guess I was tired and I saw it as kind of like two kids having kind of a little tiff together, but the more I watch it the more I realize how disturbed that little boy is". Also reviewing the film in 2005, Kate Stables of The Guardian wrote that "Newcomer Robert Morgan displays a powerful visual gift in this vivid and fiercely disturbing horror short for the Film Council's Cinema Extreme strand. Somehow he effortlessly assumes a child's unwavering gaze and phantasmagoric imagination, plunging the unwary viewer into a bloody Freudian vortex".
