= The Brothers McLeod =

The Brothers McLeod are illustrator Greg McLeod and writer Myles McLeod. They are British filmmakers represented by Sheil Land Associates and specialising in illustration, writing and 2D animation. They have been nominated for two BAFTA Film Awards for Best British Short Animation.

== Career ==
In 2008 they produced Codswallop which was nominated for a BAFTA Award for Best Short Animation at the 62nd British Academy Film Awards.

In 2011 they worked with the Royal Shakespeare Company to create a series of animations called Billy, featuring an animated version of Shakespeare and his pet pig Francis. The animations were commissioned as part of the reopening of the main theatre after a multimillion-pound restoration project.

In October they were nominated for another Children's BAFTA Award for Quiff and Boot, made with BBC Learning, which they went on to win.

2013 saw Greg McLeod animating one second a day for the whole year in a short animated film called simply 365. It featured numerous audio contributors including David Tennant, Adam Buxton and Lucy Montgomery.

In 2019 The Brothers McLeod were nominated for Best British Short Animation at the BAFTA Film Awards for their short film Marfa.

As well as working together on projects, the brothers also work on individual projects. Greg has exhibited at a variety of illustration exhibitions, including as an award winner at two Association of Illustrators tours (Images 33, Images 35). Myles also writes and develops material for other production companies, predominantly for children's television.

== Selected filmography ==
- Circle Square (Animation) preschool TV series, 2021
- Honour Wave (music video), 2019
- Marfa, 2018
- The Inverted Peak, 2016
- 365 – One Year, One Film, One Second a Day, 2013
- Phone Home, 2012
- The Existential Pleading of the Inner Heart, 2011–12
- Isle of Spagg, 2011
- Billy, 2011–16
- Quiff and Boot, 2011
- The Moon Bird, 2010
- Codswallop, nominated for BAFTA Award for Best Short Animation 2009
- Art Sparks, 2009
- Pedro and Frankensheep – CBBC TV series, 2008
- Fuggy Fuggy, 2005
- Scoop, 2015

== Books ==
- Knight Sir Louis and the Dreadful Damsel - written and illustrated by The Brothers McLeod, 2020
- Create Your Own Universe – written and illustrated by The Brothers McLeod, 2017
- Cats a Feline Compendium - written and illustrated by The Brothers McLeod with Fenella Smith, 2017
- A Book of Brilliant Ideas – written and illustrated by The Brothers McLeod, 2015
- Breeds: A Canine Compendium – written and illustrated by The Brothers McLeod with Fenella Smith, 2014
- Wuff! Ein Hundsverrucktes Handbuch – German Edition, 2015
- Breeds: A Canine Compendium – US Edition, 2015
