= Robert Morgan (filmmaker) =

British filmmaker, director and writer (born 1974)

- Born: 1974 (age 51–52); Yateley, England
- Occupations: Filmmaker, director, writer
- Years active: 1997–present
- Awards: Bafta (2012 Nominee - Best Short Film),
- Website: Official website

Robert Morgan (born 1974) is a British filmmaker, director and writer. He is most known for The Cat with Hands (2001), The Separation (2003) and Bobby Yeah (2011) which between them have won over 30 international awards.

== Personal life ==
Morgan was Raised in Yateley, Hampshire. He has an older sister named Eleanor.

Morgan occasionally paints.

Morgan participated in The Sight and Sound Greatest Films of All Time 2022 directors' poll, where he listed his 10 favourite films: The Unknown (1927 film), Vertigo (film), Seconds (1966 film), 2001: A Space Odyssey (film), Vargtimmen, The Texas Chain Saw Massacre, Le Locataire, Taxi Driver, Stalker (1979 film), and Mulholland Drive (film).

== Career ==
Robert Morgan's passion for film began when he was aged three and watched 1958's Fiend Without a Face film. He previously studied fine art, so was always drawing and painting. He then studied 'Animation Filmmaking' at The Surrey Institute Of Art And Design (now part of University for the Creative Arts). He then started his career in film animation with a student short The Man in the Lower Left-Hand Corner of the Photograph in 1997. 'FilmThreat' ran an article describing The Cat With Hands as "mandatory viewing for anyone who wants to write a horror movie". This film lead to him being commissioned to make 2 short films for Channel 4 and one from S4C in Wales.

He was earlier influenced by Francis Bacon, Edgar Allan Poe, Jan Svankmajer, the Brothers Quay, David Lynch, David Cronenberg, Joel Peter Witkin and Hans Bellmer.

He was a former Channel Four/MOMI animator in residence.

In 2003, he filmed Separation. A 10-minute animated short, begins with a pair of conjoined twin brothers in a hospital room.

Monsters was produced through the Film Council and FilmFour's Cinema Extreme scheme. The film was based on his fears when his family moved close to Broadmoor Hospital in Berkshire. It also uses the idea of violent relationship between siblings, which was also autobiographical. It was premiered at the Edinburgh Film Festival in 2004.

In 2009 he filmed Over Taken for the 48 Hour Film Project (as part of the Branchage film festival), - filming the whole film in two days (i.e. 48 hours). He went to Jersey in the Channel Islands, and then he had to pick out of a hat a film genre (he picked 'Western') and a title, and was given a couple of actresses. Then he created a short film out of those elements.

Bobby Yeah is his longest short at 23 minutes, with more characters and development than its predecessors. He likes working with live action or animation/claymation film making processes. He tried to alternate between the two forms.

In 2013, he produced Invocation for Channel 4's 'Random Acts' series.

== Filmography ==
Films
Year	Title	Role
1994	Paranoid (student Short)	Editor, director, writer, animator
1997	The Man in the Lower-Left Hand Corner of the Photograph (Short)	Editor, director, writer, animator
2001	The Cat with Hands (Short)	Director, writer, animator
2003	The Separation (Short)	Director, writer, animator
2004	Monsters (short)	Director, writer
2009	Over Taken (short)	Director, writer
2011	Bobby Yeah (short)	Director, writer, animator, editor, producer
2013	Invocation (Short)	Director, writer, editor, producer
2014	ABCs of Death 2	Director of "D is for Deloused" segment
2023	Stopmotion	Director (feature-length debut), co-writer

== Awards ==
- BAFTA Awards 2012: Nominated BAFTA Film Award Best Short Animation - Bobby Yeah (2011)
- BAFTA Awards, Wales 2004: Won BAFTA Cymru Award Best Short Film (Y Ffilm Fer Orau) - The Separation (2003)
- Fantasporto 2002: Won Onda Curta Award - The Cat with Hands (2001)
- Fantastic Fest 2023: Won Best Director - Stopmotion (2023)
- Leeds International Film Festival 2005: Won Grand Prize of European Fantasy Short Film in Silver - Monsters (2004)
- London Sci-Fi Film Festival 2003: Won Audience Award - The Cat with Hands (2001)
- Mediawave, Hungary 1999: Won Youth Award Best Youth Animation - The Man in the Lower-Left Hand Corner of the Photograph (1997)
- Rotterdam International Film Festival 2012: Nominated Tiger Award for Short Film Bobby Yeah (2011)
- Sitges Film Festival (2023): Won Special Jury Award (2023)
- Tallinn Black Nights Film Festival 2003: Won Animated Dreams Grand Prize "Wooden Wolf" with The Separation (2003)
