= Sue Goffe =

English film maker

- Occupation: Producer
- Years active: 1995–present

Sue Goffe is an English film maker.

On 24 January 2012 she was nominated for an Academy Award for the animated short film A Morning Stroll. She shared her nomination with Grant Orchard at the 84th Academy Awards.

== Filmography ==
- A Morning Stroll (short) (producer) 2011
- Varmints (short) (executive producer, producer)2009
- Lost and Found (TV short) (producer)2008
- Jojo in the Stars (short) (executive producer, producer) 2003
- Operavox (TV series) (producer - 1 episode) 1995
- Hey Duggee (TV series) (executive producer) 2014
