= Bobby Yeah =

- Poster
- Directed by: Robert Morgan
- Written by: Robert Morgan
- Cinematography: Charlotte Steeples; Robert Morgan; Marcus Waterloo
- Edited by: Robert Morgan
- Music by: ZnO
- Production companies: Swartz Can Talk; blueLight
- Distributed by: Swartz Can Talk
- Release date: July 2011 (LIAF)
- Running time: 23 minutes
- Country: United Kingdom

Bobby Yeah is a British stop motion adult animated horror short film, written, directed and animated by Robert Morgan. It was made independently and completed in 2011, and later uploaded on Robert's YouTube Channel in HD in 2017.

The film premiered at the London International Animation Festival, and went on to screen at numerous international film festivals, including The Sundance Film Festival.

Bobby Yeah was nominated for the 2012 BAFTA Award for Best Short Animation.

== Plot ==
A subhuman, rabbit-like creature named Bobby Yeah returns to his dark home with a hairy worm-like pet that he apparently stole. He notices a red button on its body and pushes it, resulting in two polyp creatures attached to metal boxes to spontaneously appear in his room. One of them begins to spew small red sperm seeds onto the floor and Bobby is forced to grab the polyp's long tongue and yank it out, killing it. The worm opens its tail and sucks up the sperm to produce an egg. The egg hatches to reveal a small furry larva with a baby face that Bobby rocks and tucks in, only for it to morph into a disgusting giant adult's head with a maggot tail that kills the pet worm. The giant head knocks Bobby onto its back where he sees another button and pushes it, sending them across a large field in broad daylight towards a metal box house.

Bobby finds himself in a room with pink fur walls where a face on a wall and a winged baby with an external heart interrogate him over the theft of the pet worm. After reluctantly admitting to the deed, as well as the worm's death, the baby produces a second head from their heart that spits two globs onto the face and Bobby's chest that each morph into red buttons. At the baby's command, a small finger scorpion and a tall armless, bird-headed being enter the room to attack Bobby, intent on pressing the button fused to his chest. He manages to kill both of the grunts and the baby before escaping the room through a doorway.

Bobby returns to his silent, gloomy home exhausted. After reflecting on and stroking the worm's lifeless body, he lies down beside it to rest, until the giant head and surviving polyp, now donned in police bobby helmets, enter the house. A gollywog head bursts through the floor and screams out a hooded man resembling Death, an executioner, and a guillotine from its mouth. At the beckoning of the worm, Bobby pushes the button on his chest in an attempt to escape punishment, causing him to produce hairs similar to the worm's on his head and transform into an octopus creature, inadvertently killing everyone in the room. The face returns to laugh at Bobby's fate, but he pokes out its eyes with his tentacles, blinding it, and then pushes the button on its face. A couple sperm remaining in the room enter through an orifice in Bobby who then gives birth to a deformed being with eyes and tentacles. The offspring caresses Bobby's head before removing it from his body, though he remains alive. He lifts Bobby's head up and allows it to float away through a hole in the ceiling. The offspring waves goodbye as Bobby's head continues to float onward into a purple void.

== Awards ==
- Best Animated Short - Fantasia Film Festival, 2011
- Bronze Audience Award for Best Short Film - Fantasia Film Festival, 2011
- Best British Film - London Animation Festival, 2011
- Best Animated Short - Fantaspoa Fantasy Film Festival, 2011
- Best Horror Film - London Short Film Festival, 2012
- Special Jury Prize - Clermont Ferrand Short Film Festival, 2012
- BAFTA Nomination for Best Animated Short, 2012
- Special Jury Award - Animafest Zagreb, 2012
- Grand Prize - Toronto Animated Arts Festival, 2012
- Best Animation - Tabor Film Festival, 2012
- Best Animation - New Horizons International Film Festival, 2012
- Best Animation - Mile High Horror Film Festival, 2012
- Best Short Animation - Lausanne Underground Film and Music Festival, 2012
