= Breath of Life (1991 film) =

- Directed by: Navin Thapar
- Written by: Nasser Memarzia; Kulvinder Ghir
- Starring: Amir M. Korangy; Moshe Ivgy
- Cinematography: Jon Felix
- Release date: 1991
- Country: United Kingdom
- Language: English

Breath of Life (1991) is a BAFTA Award-nominated British short film directed by Navin Thapar, written by Nasser Memarzia and Kulvinder Ghir, with Amir Korangy and Moshe Ivgy as the lead actors. The film depicts a group of prisoners of conscience that have forged strong emotional bonds and share seemingly trivial aspirations in order to cling on to some semblance of hope, defiance, and collective survival.
