= Will Anderson (animator) =

Scottish-born film animator

Will Anderson BA Animation
- Born: Dingwall, Scotland
- Education: Edinburgh College of Art
- Occupation: Writer/Director Animator
- Notable work: The Making of Longbird (2011)
- Website: wanderson.co.uk

Will Anderson is a Scottish-born film animator, living and working in Edinburgh, best known for his award-winning short animation The Making of Longbird.

== Early life ==
Anderson was born and attended school in Dingwall, Scottish Highlands. He became an award-winning animator when in 2013 he won a BAFTA for his short animated film The Making of Longbird. Watching adult themed animations such as South Park created by Matt Stone and Trey Parker sparked an interest in this genre and, using an old camera that belonged to his dad, he created his own short film clip which inspired him to apply to Edinburgh College of Art. He attended Edinburgh College of Art after leaving school in 2007, graduating in 2011 with a BA in animation.

== Career ==
Anderson achieved international acclaim with his graduation film The Making of Longbird, which has been screened at over 50 film festivals, winning awards at the BAFTAs, the Annecy International Animated Film Festival, Glasgow Short Film Festival, Leipzig DOK Festival and the Warsaw International Film Festival. Together with Ainslie Henderson, he created White Robot. Specialising in design & character animation for film and television, he works from a studio in Summerhall, Edinburgh.

== Awards and recognition ==
- 2012 Winner British Academy Scotland Award Animation for The Making of Longbird.
- 2013 Winner BAFTA Short Animation for The Making of Longbird (with Ainslie Henderson).
- 2014 Winner British Academy Scotland Award for Monkey Love Experiments.
- 2014 Winner Edinburgh International Film Festival Outstanding Individual Contribution to a Short Film for Monkey Love Experiments.
- 2018 Nominee BAFTA British Short Animation for Have Heart.
- 2018 Nominee European Animation Awards Best Background & Character Design in an Animated Short Film for Have Heart.

== Filmography ==
- The Making of Longbird (2011)
- Sweetie & Sunshine (2012)
- Monkey Love Experiments (2014)
- The Infinity Project (2015)
- Have Heart (2017)
- A Cat Called Dom (2022, feature debut; currently festival screenings)
