= Joanna Quinn =

English film director and animator

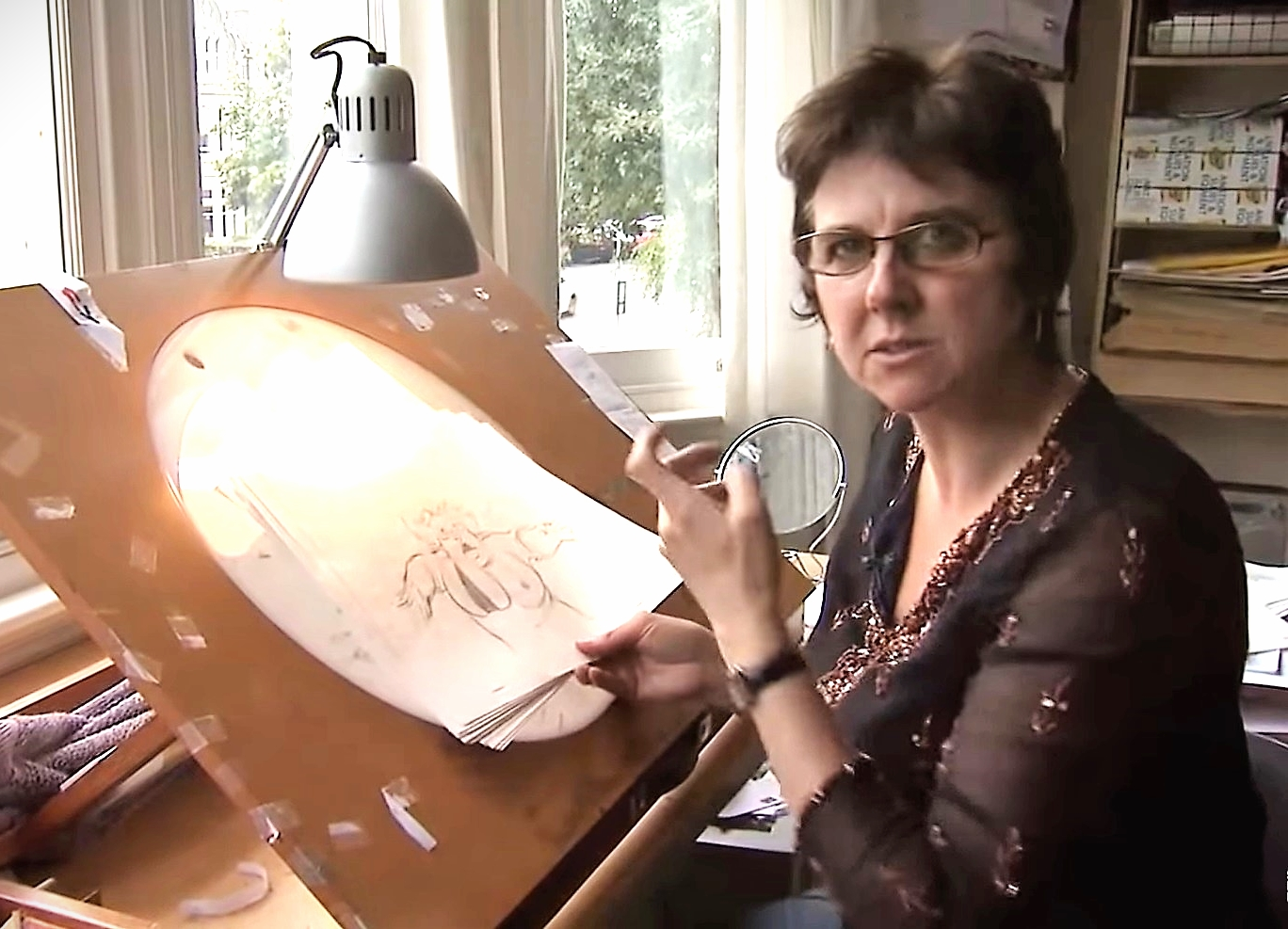
Quinn at her drawing board for the National Science and Media Museum in 2009

Joanna Lisa Quinn is an English independent film director and animator.

== Early life ==
Quinn was born in Birmingham, England and grew up in North London. She went to school at Highgate Wood Secondary School and completed a foundation course in art at Goldsmiths College, University of London before studying for a BA in Graphic Design at Middlesex University.

== Career ==
Quinn's first film Girls Night Out was completed in 1987 and won three awards at the Annecy Film Festival. This film introduced the anti-heroine character of Beryl and follows her antics when she goes to see a male stripper. Beryl appeared in Quinn's next film Body Beautiful (1990) in which she is the factory union rep dealing with a macho workmate named Vince, voiced by Rob Brydon. In Dreams and Desires - Family Ties (2006), Beryl becomes obsessed with film making and is asked to video a friend's wedding. Affairs of the Art was written and produced by Les Mills and voiced by Brendan Charleson and Menna Trussler as Beryl. It was released in January 2021, and won Best Animation at its World Premiere in the Clermont-Ferrand Short Film Festival. Beryl is totally obsessed with drawing and her fixation dominates her life the entire household.

Quinn's other films include Elles (1992), Britannia (1993) — with voice talent of Christine Pritchard and music by Ben Heneghan and Ian Lawson, Famous Fred (1996) — with voice talent of Lenny Henry and Tom Courtenay — and Wife of Bath (1998) — with voice talent of Billie Whitelaw, Liz Smith and David Troughton.

In 1987 Quinn founded Beryl Productions International Ltd with producer/writer Les Mills. As well as personal films Beryl Productions International Ltd has produced commercials for the UK, US, Mexican and Canadian markets. Clients include Charmin, (which in the 2010 US industry magazine, Adweek, put the Charmin bear as one of the top 10 advertising icons of the decade), Whiskas, and United Airlines. Nearly all of these commercials have Quinn's distinctive drawing style, and were animated by hand, on paper. Quinn has been honoured with retrospectives of her work in all over the world including Rome, Rio de Janeiro, New York, Stuttgart, Zagreb, Hiroshima, Toronto, Montreal, Gothenburg, Bradford, Cordoba, Tampere, Ottawa, London, Valencia, Taiwan, and Moscow.

In 2008, her work was shown in an exhibition called 'Drawings that Move', curated by Michael Harvey at the National Media Museum in Bradford, England. This exhibition has since travelled to Valencia, Spain, Ljubljana, Slovenia, Teplice, the Czech Republic, and Amarante in Portugal.

Quinn has been awarded an Honorary Degree of Doctor of Arts from the University of Wolverhampton, an Honorary Degree of Doctor of Arts from Middlesex University, a Fellowship from the University of Wales, and has been made an Honorary Fellow of Royal College of Art, London. She became a member of the Academy of Motion Picture Arts and Sciences in 2017.

During the Gaza genocide, Quinn started organising fundraisers and screenings of the films that Gazan animator Haneen Koraz produced with children. She and others founded the collective Animation Community for Palestine (ac4pal) in February 2025 to support Koraz' work. When she won the Honorary Cristal at the Annecy International Animation Film Festival 2025, she dedicated it to Koraz.

== Awards ==
Quinn has won over a hundred international awards, including 2 Emmy awards, 4 BAFTA awards and Jury prizes at all the major animation festivals. Two of her films, Famous Fred (1997) and Affairs of the Art (2021), each received an Academy Award nomination. The latter film has already won numerous international awards including 6 Audience prizes, 2 grand prix, and awards for best comedy, best director, best British and Best European film. In 1996 Quinn was invited to Buckingham Palace and awarded the Leonardo da Vinci International Art Award. In 2006 her film Dreams and Desires: Family Ties won the Cartoon d'Or and Grand Prix at World Festival of Animated Film - Animafest Zagreb. In 2014, she was honoured with the ASIFA laureate. In 2021 she received the Crystal Pegasus —a lifetime achievement award, at the 2021 Animator Festival in Poznań.

== Filmography ==
- Girls Night Out (1987)
- Body Beautiful (1990)
- Elles (1992)
- Britannia (1993)
- Famous Fred (1996)
- The Wife of Bath - The Canterbury Tales (1998)
- Dreams and Desires – Family Ties (2006)
- Affairs of the Art (2021)
- This Land Is a Woman (2025)
