= A Morning Stroll =

- US Film poster
- Directed by: Grant Orchard
- Produced by: Sue Goffe
- Music by: Nic Gill
- Production company: Studio AKA
- Release date: 10 June 2011
- Running time: 7 minutes
- Country: United Kingdom

A Morning Stroll is an English animated short film by Grant Orchard. The film was screened at the 2011 Brooklyn Film Festival as well as the 2012 Sundance Film Festival where it won Best Animation and the Jury Prize in Animated Short Film respectively. The film was nominated Best Animated Short Film at the 84th Academy Awards and won Best Short Animation at the 65th British Academy Film Awards.

The film is loosely based on an event in True Tales of American Life by American author Paul Auster.

== Plot ==
=== 1959 ===
Opening in the style of classic black and white animated shorts, a man is on his way to work in a busy city. As he makes his way through a street, he notices a chicken casually walking past him and knocking on an apartment door with its beak. The door opens and the chicken enters. Though perplexed by this, the man resumes his walk to work.

=== 2009 ===
In the modern era now set in colour, a passer-by walks through the same busy city, looking at his smartphone, ignorant that he bumped into a man and spilled coffee on him. On the same street where the chicken walked, it appears again as it casually walks past him. As he sees this, he prepares to record it on his phone when he receives a notification of a new smartphone game, distracted. Choosing to play the game, the chicken meanwhile knocks on the door and enters by the time the passer-by remembers what he had to do. With the chicken gone, the passer-by resumes his walk, oblivious to the confrontational man that he spilled his coffee on.

=== 2059 ===
In the future, the same city is now devoid of all life and overrun by zombies. Walking through the now deserted street, one such zombie notices the chicken walking past it. As the chicken pauses and notices the zombie, it immediately goes berserk and attempts to eat the chicken. Panicking, the chicken evades the zombie and frantically knocks on the door. The zombie attempts to chase the chicken through the door, but the door slams on it at the last minute, killing it.

Behind the door, it is revealed that the inside of the apartment is animated in the same style of 1959. The chicken's owner, an old bearded man, sighs with relief and looks at the chicken, saying "You and your morning stroll". The chicken is oblivious to his response.
