= Robert Gould (set decorator) =

American set decorator

- Occupation: Set decorator
- Years active: 1973–present
- Parent: Charles S. Gould (father)

Robert Gould, often credited as Bob Gould, is an American set decorator. He was nominated for two Academy Awards in the category Best Art Direction for the films Master and Commander: The Far Side of the World and The Artist. The son of director Charles S. Gould, Robert Gould is credited with work on over 100 films and television series'.

== Select filmography ==
- Flight 7500 (2014)
- The Artist (2011)
- The Expendables (2010) (credited as Bob Gould)
- Angels & Demons (2009)
- Live Free or Die Hard (2007)
- Poseidon (2006)
- Master and Commander: The Far Side of the World (2003)
- Starship Troopers (1997) (credited as Bob Gould)
- Demolition Man (1993)
- Cliffhanger (1993) (credited as Bob Gould)
- Total Recall (1990)
- Leviathan (1989)
- RoboCop (1987)
- Cobra (1986)
- Commando (1985)
- St. Elmo's Fire (1985)
- The Postman Always Rings Twice (1981)
- Carrie (1976)

== Awards ==
- 2012 Academy Award for Best Art Direction for The Artist (co-nominated with Laurence Bennett)
- 2012 BAFTA Award for Best Production Design for The Artist (nominated)
- 2010 ADG Excellence in Production Design Award for Angels & Demons (nominated)
- 2004 Academy Award for Best Art Direction for Master and Commander: The Far Side of the World (co-nominated with William Sandell)
- 2004 Satellite Award for Best Art Direction and Production Design Master and Commander: The Far Side of the World (nominated)
