= Laurence Bennett =

American production designer

- Occupation: Production designer

Laurence Bennett is an American production designer. He was nominated for an Academy Award in the category Best Production Design for the film The Artist.

== Selected filmography ==
- The Artist (2011; co-nominated with Robert Gould)
