= Chris Moll =

British film producer

Chris (or Christopher) Moll is a British film producer. He won the BAFTA for Best Short Animated Film in 1994 for The Wrong Trousers.

Moll was born in Colchester. He was educated at Devonport High School for Boys and University of Bristol, graduating with a BA in Drama.

His credits as a producer and executive producer include Of Time and the City, Nowhere Boy, Hamilton Mattress, The Girl with all the Gifts and Lady Macbeth.

In 2010, Moll created the iFeatures low budget feature film initiative in partnership with South West Screen (now Creative England) and BBC Films.

He was also nominated for a BAFTA Film Award for Adam in 1992 and Trainspotter in 1997.

Moll currently lives in Bristol. He has a daughter and son.
