= BAFTA Award for Best Special Visual Effects =

British film industry award

- Awarded for: Best Special Visual Effects
- Location: United Kingdom
- Presented by: British Academy of Film and Television Arts
- Currently held by: Joe Letteri, Richard Baneham, Daniel Barrett, and Eric Saindon for Avatar: Fire and Ash (2025)
- Website: http://www.bafta.org/

The BAFTA Award for Best Special Visual Effects is a film award presented by the British Academy of Film and Television Arts (BAFTA) at the annual British Academy Film Awards. This award recognises achievement in the crafts of special effects and visual effects.

In the following lists, the titles and names in bold with a gold background are the winners and recipients respectively; those not in bold are the nominees. The years given are those in which the films under consideration were released, not the year of the ceremony, which always takes place the following year.

== Winners and nominees ==
indicates the winner

=== 1980s ===
Year	Film	Recipient(s)
**1982** (36th)	**Poltergeist**	**Richard Edlund**
**1982** (36th)	Blade Runner	Douglas Trumbull, Richard Yuricich and David Dryer
**1982** (36th)	E.T. the Extra-Terrestrial	Dennis Muren and Carlo Rambaldi
**1982** (36th)	Tron	Richard Taylor and Harrison Ellenshaw
**1983** (37th)	**Return of the Jedi**	**Richard Edlund, Dennis Muren, Ken Ralston and Kit West**
**1983** (37th)	The Dark Crystal	Roy Field, Brian Smithies and Ian Wingrove
**1983** (37th)	WarGames	Michael L. Fink, Joe Digaetano, Jack Cooperman, Don Hansard, Colin Cantwell and William A. Fraker
**1983** (37th)	Zelig	Gordon Willis Joel Hynek, Stuart Robertson and Richard Greenberg
**1984** (38th)	**Indiana Jones and the Temple of Doom**	**Dennis Muren, George Gibbs, Michael J. McAlister and Lorne Peterson**
**1984** (38th)	The Company of Wolves	Christopher Tucker and Alan Whibley
**1984** (38th)	Ghostbusters	Richard Edlund
**1984** (38th)	The Killing Fields	Fred Cramer
**1985** (39th)	**Brazil**	**George Gibbs and Richard Conway**
**1985** (39th)	Back to the Future	Kevin Pike and Ken Ralston
**1985** (39th)	Legend	Nick Allder and Peter Voysey
**1985** (39th)	The Purple Rose of Cairo	Greenberg Associates
**1986** (40th)	**Aliens**	**Robert Skotak, Brian Johnson, Suzanne M. Benson, John Richardson and Stan Winston**
**1986** (40th)	The Mission	Peter Hutchinson
**1986** (40th)	Dreamchild	Duncan Kenworthy, John Stephenson and Chris Carr
**1986** (40th)	Labyrinth	Roy Field, Brian Froud, George Gibbs and Tony Dunsterville
**1987** (41st)	**The Witches of Eastwick**	**Michael Lantieri, Michael Owens, Ed Jones and Bruce Walters**
**1987** (41st)	The Fly	Chris Walas, Jon Berg, Louis Craig and Hoyt Yeatman
**1987** (41st)	Full Metal Jacket	John Evans
**1987** (41st)	Little Shop of Horrors	Bran Ferren, Martin Gutteridge, Lyle Conway and Richard Conway
**1988** (42nd)	**Who Framed Roger Rabbit**	**George Gibbs, Richard Williams, Ken Ralston and Ed Jones**
**1988** (42nd)	Beetlejuice	Peter Kuran, Alan Munro, Robert Short and Ted Rae
**1988** (42nd)	The Last Emperor	Giannetto De Rossi and Fabrizio Martinelli
**1988** (42nd)	RoboCop	Rob Bottin, Phil Tippett, Peter Kuran and Rocco Gioffre
**1989** (43rd)	**Back to the Future Part II**	**Ken Ralston, Michael Lantieri, John Bell and Steve Gawley**
**1989** (43rd)	The Adventures of Baron Munchausen	Kent Houston and Richard Conway
**1989** (43rd)	Batman	Derek Meddings and John Evans
**1989** (43rd)	Indiana Jones and the Last Crusade	George Gibbs, Michael J. McAlister, Mark Sullivan and John Ellis

=== 1990s ===
Year	Film	Recipient(s)
**1990** (44th)	**Honey, I Shrunk the Kids**	**Production Team**
**1990** (44th)	Dick Tracy	Production Team
**1990** (44th)	Ghost	Production Team
**1990** (44th)	Total Recall	Production Team
**1991** (45th)	**Terminator 2: Judgment Day**	**Stan Winston, Dennis Muren, Gene Warren Jr. and Robert Skotak**
**1991** (45th)	Backdraft	Allen Hall, Scott Farrar, Clay Pinney and Mikael Salomon
**1991** (45th)	Edward Scissorhands	Stan Winston
**1991** (45th)	Prospero's Books	Frans Wamelink, Eve Ramboz and Masao Yamaguchi
**1992** (46th)	**Death Becomes Her**	**Michael Lantieri, Ken Ralston, Alec Gillis, Tom Woodruff Jr., Doug Chiang and Douglas Smythe**
**1992** (46th)	Alien 3	Richard Edlund, George Gibbs, Alec Gillis and Tom Woodruff Jr.
**1992** (46th)	Batman Returns	Michael L. Fink, John Bruno, Craig Barron and Dennis Skotak
**1992** (46th)	Beauty and the Beast	Randy Fullmer
**1993** (47th)	**Jurassic Park**	**Dennis Muren, Stan Winston, Phil Tippett and Michael Lantieri**
**1993** (47th)	Aladdin	Don Paul and Steve Goldberg
**1993** (47th)	Dracula	Roman Coppola, Gary Gutierrez, Michael Lantieri and Gene Warren Jr.
**1993** (47th)	The Fugitive	William Mesa and Roy Arbogast
**1994** (48th)	**Forrest Gump**	**Ken Ralston, George Murphy, Stephen Rosenbaum, Doug Chiang and Allen Hall**
**1994** (48th)	The Mask	Scott Squires, Steve 'Spaz' Williams, Tom Bertino and Jon Farhat
**1994** (48th)	Speed	Boyd Shermis, John Frazier, Ron Brinkmann and Richard E. Hollander
**1994** (48th)	True Lies	John Bruno, Thomas L. Fisher, Jacques Stroweis, Patrick McClung and Jamie Dixon
**1995** (49th)	**Apollo 13**	**Robert Legato, Michael Kanfer, Matt Sweeney and Leslie Ekker**
**1995** (49th)	Babe	Scott E. Anderson, Neal Scanlan, John Cox, Chris Chitty and Charles Gibson
**1995** (49th)	GoldenEye	Chris Corbould, Derek Meddings and Brian Smithies
**1995** (49th)	Waterworld	Michael J. McAlister, Brad Kuehn, Robert Spurlock and Martin Bresin
**1996** (50th)	**Twister**	**Stefen Fangmeier, John Frazier, Henry LaBounta and Habib Zargarpour**
**1996** (50th)	Independence Day	Tricia Henry Ashford, Volker Engel, Clay Pinney, Douglas Smith and Joe Viskocil
**1996** (50th)	The Nutty Professor	Jon Farhat
**1996** (50th)	Toy Story	Eben Fiske Ostby and Bill Reeves
**1997** (51st)	**The Fifth Element**	**Mark Stetson, Karen Goulekas, Nick Allder, Neil Corbould and Nick Dudman**
**1997** (51st)	The Borrowers	Peter Chiang
**1997** (51st)	Men in Black	Eric Brevig, Rick Baker, Rob Coleman and Peter Chesney
**1997** (51st)	Titanic	Robert Legato, Mark Lasoff, Thomas L. Fisher and Michael Kanfer
**1998** (52nd)	**Saving Private Ryan**	**Stefen Fangmeier, Roger Guyett and Neil Corbould**
**1998** (52nd)	Antz	Philippe Gluckman, John Bell, Kendal Cronkhite and Ken Bielenberg
**1998** (52nd)	Babe: Pig in the City	Bill Westenhofer, Neal Scanlan, Chris Godfrey and Grahame Andrew
**1998** (52nd)	The Truman Show	Michael J. McAlister, Brad Kuehn, Craig Barron and Peter Chesney
**1999** (53rd)	**The Matrix**	**John Gaeta, Steve Courtley, Janek Sirrs and Jon Thum**
**1999** (53rd)	A Bug's Life	Bill Reeves, Eben Fiske Ostby, Rick Sayre and Sharon Calahan
**1999** (53rd)	The Mummy	John Berton, Daniel Jeannette, Ben Snow and Chris Corbould
**1999** (53rd)	Sleepy Hollow	Jim Mitchell, Kevin Yagher, Joss Williams and Paddy Eason
**1999** (53rd)	Star Wars: Episode I – The Phantom Menace	John Knoll, Dennis Muren, Scott Squires and Rob Coleman

=== 2000s ===
Year	Film	Recipient(s)
**2000** (54th)	**The Perfect Storm**	**Stefen Fangmeier, John Frazier, Walt Conti, Habib Zargarpour and Tim Alexander**
**2000** (54th)	Chicken Run	Paddy Eason, Mark Nelmes and Dave Alex Riddett
**2000** (54th)	Crouching Tiger, Hidden Dragon	Rob Hodgson, Leo Lo, Jonathan F. Styrlund, Bessie Cheuk and Travis Baumann
**2000** (54th)	Gladiator	John Nelson, Neil Corbould, Tim Burke and Rob Harvey
**2000** (54th)	Vertical Limit	Kent Houston, Tricia Henry Ashford, Neil Corbould, John Paul Docherty and Dion Hatch
**2001** (55th)	**The Lord of the Rings: The Fellowship of the Ring**	**Jim Rygiel, Richard Taylor, Alex Funke, Randall William Cook and Mark Stetson**
**2001** (55th)	A.I. Artificial Intelligence	Dennis Muren, Scott Farrar and Michael Lantieri
**2001** (55th)	Harry Potter and the Philosopher's Stone	Robert Legato, Nick Davis, John Richardson, Roger Guyett and Jim Berney
**2001** (55th)	Moulin Rouge!	Chris Godfrey andy Brown, Nathan McGuinness and Brian Cox
**2001** (55th)	Shrek	Ken Bielenberg
**2002** (56th)	**The Lord of the Rings: The Two Towers**	**Jim Rygiel, Joe Letteri, Randall William Cook and Alex Funke**
**2002** (56th)	Gangs of New York	R. Bruce Steinheimer, Michael Owens, Ed Hirsh and Jon Alexander
**2002** (56th)	Harry Potter and the Chamber of Secrets	Jim Mitchell, Nick Davis, John Richardson, Bill George and Nick Dudman
**2002** (56th)	Minority Report	Scott Farrar, Michael Lantieri, Nathan McGuinness and Henry LaBounta
**2002** (56th)	Spider-Man	John Dykstra, Scott Stokdyk, John Frazier and Anthony LaMolinara
**2003** (57th)	**The Lord of the Rings: The Return of the King**	**Joe Letteri, Jim Rygiel, Randall William Cook and Alex Funke**
**2003** (57th)	Big Fish	Kevin Scott Mack, Seth Maury, Lindsay MacGowan and Paddy Eason
**2003** (57th)	Kill Bill: Volume 1	Tommy Tom, Kia Kwan, Tam Wai, Kit Leung, Jaco Wong and Hin Leung
**2003** (57th)	Master and Commander: The Far Side of the World	Stefen Fangmeier, Nathan McGuinness, Robert Stromberg and Dan Sudick
**2003** (57th)	Pirates of the Caribbean: The Curse of the Black Pearl	John Knoll, Hal Hickel, Terry Frazee and Charles Gibson
**2004** (58th)	**The Day After Tomorrow**	**Karen Goulekas, Neil Corbould, Greg Strause and Remo Balcells**
**2004** (58th)	The Aviator	Robert Legato, Peter G. Travers, Matthew Gratzner and R. Bruce Steinheimer
**2004** (58th)	Harry Potter and the Prisoner of Azkaban	John Richardson, Roger Guyett, Tim Burke, Bill George and Karl Mooney
**2004** (58th)	House of Flying Daggers	Angie Lam andy Brown, Kirsty Millar and Luke Hetherington
**2004** (58th)	Spider-Man 2	John Dykstra, Scott Stokdyk, Anthony LaMolinara and John Frazier
**2005** (59th)	**King Kong**	**Joe Letteri, Christian Rivers, Brian Van't Hul and Richard Taylor**
**2005** (59th)	Batman Begins	Janek Sirrs, Dan Glass, Chris Corbould and Paul J. Franklin
**2005** (59th)	Charlie and the Chocolate Factory	Nick Davis, Jon Thum, Chas Jarrett and Joss Williams
**2005** (59th)	The Chronicles of Narnia: The Lion, the Witch and the Wardrobe	Dean Wright, Bill Westenhofer, Jim Berney and Scott Farrar
**2005** (59th)	Harry Potter and the Goblet of Fire	Jim Mitchell, John Richardson, Tim Webber and Tim Alexander
**2006** (60th)	**Pirates of the Caribbean: Dead Man's Chest**	**John Knoll, Hal Hickel, Charles Gibson and Allen Hall**
**2006** (60th)	Casino Royale	Steven Begg, Chris Corbould, John Paul and Ditch Doy
**2006** (60th)	Children of Men	Frazer Churchill, Tim Webber, Mike Eames and Paul Corbould
**2006** (60th)	Pan's Labyrinth	Edward Irastorza, Everett Burrell, David Martí and Montse Ribé
**2006** (60th)	Superman Returns	Mark Stetson, Neil Corbould, Richard R. Hoover and Jon Thum
**2007** (61st)	**The Golden Compass**	**Michael Fink, Bill Westenhofer, Ben Morris and Trevor Wood**
**2007** (61st)	The Bourne Ultimatum	Peter Chiang, Charlie Noble, Mattias Lindahl and Joss Williams
**2007** (61st)	Harry Potter and the Order of the Phoenix	Tim Burke, John Richardson, Emma Norton and Chris Shaw
**2007** (61st)	Pirates of the Caribbean: At World's End	John Knoll, Charles Gibson, Hal Hickel and John Frazier
**2007** (61st)	Spider-Man 3	Scott Stokdyk, Peter Nofz, John Frazier and Spencer Cook
**2008** (62nd)	**The Curious Case of Benjamin Button**	**Eric Barba, Craig Barron, Nathan McGuinness and Edson Williams**
**2008** (62nd)	The Dark Knight	Chris Corbould, Nick Davis, Paul Franklin and Tim Webber
**2008** (62nd)	Indiana Jones and the Kingdom of the Crystal Skull	Pablo Helman
**2008** (62nd)	Iron Man	Shane Patrick Mahan, John Nelson and Ben Snow
**2008** (62nd)	Quantum of Solace	Chris Corbould and Kevin Tod Haug
**2009** (63rd)	**Avatar**	**Joe Letteri, Stephen Rosenbaum, Richard Baneham and Andrew R. Jones**
**2009** (63rd)	District 9	Dan Kaufman, Peter Muyzers, Robert Habros and Matt Aitken
**2009** (63rd)	Harry Potter and the Half-Blood Prince	John Richardson, Tim Burke, Tim Alexander and Nicolas Aithadi
**2009** (63rd)	The Hurt Locker	Richard Stutsman
**2009** (63rd)	Star Trek	Roger Guyett, Russell Earl, Paul Kavanagh and Burt Dalton

=== 2010s ===
Year	Film	Recipient(s)
**2010** (64th)	**Inception**	**Chris Corbould, Paul Franklin, Andrew Lockley and Peter Bebb**
**2010** (64th)	Alice in Wonderland	Ken Ralston, David Schaub, Sean Philips and Carey Villegas
**2010** (64th)	Black Swan	Dan Schrecker
**2010** (64th)	Harry Potter and the Deathly Hallows – Part 1	Tim Burke, John Richardson, Nicolas Aithadi and Christian Manz
**2010** (64th)	Toy Story 3	Guido Quaroni, Michael Fong and David Ryu
**2011** (65th)	**Harry Potter and the Deathly Hallows – Part 2**	**Tim Burke, John Richardson, Greg Butler and David Vickery**
**2011** (65th)	The Adventures of Tintin: The Secret of the Unicorn	Joe Letteri, Keith Miller, Wayne Stables and Jamie Beard
**2011** (65th)	Hugo	Robert Legato, Ben Grossmann and Joss Williams
**2011** (65th)	Rise of the Planet of the Apes	Joe Letteri, Dan Lemmon and R. Christopher White
**2011** (65th)	War Horse	Ben Morris and Neil Corbould
**2012** (66th)	**Life of Pi**	**Bill Westenhofer, Guillaume Rocheron and Erik-Jan de Boer**
**2012** (66th)	The Avengers	Janek Sirrs, Jeff White, Guy Williams and Dan Sudick
**2012** (66th)	The Dark Knight Rises	Paul Franklin, Chris Corbould, Peter Bebb and Andrew Lockley
**2012** (66th)	The Hobbit: An Unexpected Journey	Joe Letteri, Eric Saindon, David Clayton and R. Christopher White
**2012** (66th)	Prometheus	Richard Stammers, Charley Henley, Trevor Wood and Paul Butterworth
**2013** (67th)	**Gravity**	**Tim Webber, Chris Lawrence, Dave Shirk, Neil Corbould and Nikki Penny**
**2013** (67th)	The Hobbit: The Desolation of Smaug	Joe Letteri, Eric Saindon, David Clayton and Eric Reynolds
**2013** (67th)	Iron Man 3	Bryan Grill, Christopher Townsend, Guy Williams and Dan Sudick
**2013** (67th)	Pacific Rim	Hal Hickel, John Knoll, Lindy DeQuattro and Nigel Sumner
**2013** (67th)	Star Trek Into Darkness	Roger Guyett, Patrick Tubach, Ben Grossmann and Burt Dalton
**2014** (68th)	**Interstellar**	**Paul Franklin, Scott R. Fisher, Andrew Lockley and Ian Hunter**
**2014** (68th)	Dawn of the Planet of the Apes	Joe Letteri, Dan Lemmon, Erik Winquist and Daniel Barrett
**2014** (68th)	Guardians of the Galaxy	Stephane Ceretti, Paul Corbould, Jonathan Fawkner and Nicolas Aithadi
**2014** (68th)	The Hobbit: The Battle of the Five Armies	Joe Letteri, Eric Saindon, David Clayton and R. Christopher White
**2014** (68th)	X-Men: Days of Future Past	Richard Stammers, Anders Langlands, Tim Crosbie and Cameron Waldbauer
**2015** (69th)	**Star Wars: The Force Awakens**	**Chris Corbould, Roger Guyett, Paul Kavanagh and Neal Scanlan**
**2015** (69th)	Ant-Man	Jake Morrison, Greg Steele, Dan Sudick and Alex Wuttke
**2015** (69th)	Ex Machina	Mark Williams Ardington, Sara Bennett, Paul Norris and Andrew Whitehurst
**2015** (69th)	Mad Max: Fury Road	Andrew Jackson, Dan Oliver, Tom Wood and Andy Williams
**2015** (69th)	The Martian	Tim Ledbury, Richard Stammers and Steven Warner
**2016** (70th)	**The Jungle Book**	**Robert Legato, Dan Lemmon, Andrew R. Jones and Adam Valdez**
**2016** (70th)	Arrival	Louis Morin
**2016** (70th)	Doctor Strange	Richard Bluff, Stephane Ceretti, Paul Corbould and Jonathan Fawkner
**2016** (70th)	Fantastic Beasts and Where to Find Them	Tim Burke, Pablo Grillo, Christian Manz and David Watkins
**2016** (70th)	Rogue One: A Star Wars Story	Neil Corbould, Hal Hickel, Mohen Leo, John Knoll and Nigel Sumner
**2017** (71st)	**Blade Runner 2049**	**Richard R. Hoover, Paul Lambert, Gerd Nefzer and John Nelson**
**2017** (71st)	Dunkirk	Scott Fisher, Andrew Jackson, Paul Corbould and Andrew Lockley
**2017** (71st)	The Shape of Water	Dennis Berardi, Trey Harrell, Mike Hill and Kevin Scott
**2017** (71st)	Star Wars: The Last Jedi	Stephen Aplin, Chris Corbould, Ben Morris and Neal Scanlan
**2017** (71st)	War for the Planet of the Apes	Daniel Barrett, Dan Lemmon, Joe Letteri and Joel Whist
**2018** (72nd)	**Black Panther**	**Geoffrey Baumann, Jesse James Chisholm, Craig Hammack and Dan Sudick**
**2018** (72nd)	Avengers: Infinity War	Dan DeLeeuw, Russell Earl, Kelly Port and Dan Sudick
**2018** (72nd)	Fantastic Beasts: The Crimes of Grindelwald	Tim Burke, Andy Kind, Christian Manz, David Watkins
**2018** (72nd)	First Man	Ian Hunter, Paul Lambert, Tristan Myles, J.D. Schwalm
**2018** (72nd)	Ready Player One	Matthew E. Butler, Grady Cofer, Roger Guyett, David Shirk
**2019** (73rd)	**1917**	**Greg Butler, Guillaume Rocheron and Dominic Tuohy**
**2019** (73rd)	Avengers: Endgame	Dan DeLeeuw and Dan Sudick
**2019** (73rd)	The Irishman	Ivan Busquets, Leandro Estebecorena, Stephane Grabli and Pablo Helman
**2019** (73rd)	The Lion King	Andrew R. Jones, Robert Legato, Elliot Newman and Adam Valdez
**2019** (73rd)	Star Wars: The Rise of Skywalker	Roger Guyett, Paul Kavanagh, Neal Scanlan and Dominic Tuohy

=== 2020s ===
Year	Film	Recipient(s)
**2020** (74th)	**Tenet**	**Scott Fisher, Andrew Jackson and Andrew Lockley**
**2020** (74th)	Greyhound	Pete Bebb, Nathan McGuinness and Sebastian von Overheidt
**2020** (74th)	The Midnight Sky	Matt Kasmir, Chris Lawrence and David Watkins
**2020** (74th)	Mulan	Sean Faden, Steve Ingram, Anders Langlands and Seth Maury
**2020** (74th)	The One and Only Ivan	Santiago Colomo Martinez, Nick Davis and Greg Fisher
**2021** (75th)	**Dune**	**Brian Connor, Paul Lambert, Tristan Myles and Gerd Nefzer**
**2021** (75th)	Free Guy	Swen Gillberg, Bryan Grill, Nikos Kalaitzidis and Dan Sudick
**2021** (75th)	Ghostbusters: Afterlife	Aharon Bourland, Sheena Duggal, Pier Lefebvre and Alessandro Ongaro
**2021** (75th)	The Matrix Resurrections	Tom Debenham, Huw J. Evans, Dan Glass and J. D. Schwalm
**2021** (75th)	No Time to Die	Mark Bakowski, Chris Corbould, Joel Green and Charlie Noble
**2022** (76th)	**Avatar: The Way of Water**	**Richard Baneham, Daniel Barrett, Joe Letteri and Eric Saindon**
**2022** (76th)	All Quiet on the Western Front	Markus Frank, Kamil Jafar, Viktor Müller and Frank Petzold
**2022** (76th)	The Batman	Russell Earl, Dan Lemmon, Anders Langlands and Dominic Tuohy
**2022** (76th)	Everything Everywhere All at Once	Benjamin Brewer, Ethan Feldbau, Jonathan Kombrinck and Zak Stoltz
**2022** (76th)	Top Gun: Maverick	Seth Hill, Scott R. Fisher, Bryan Litson and Ryan Tudhope
**2023** (77th)	**Poor Things**	**Tim Barter, Simon Hughes, Dean Koonjul and Jane Paton**
**2023** (77th)	The Creator	Jonathan Bullock, Charmaine Chan, Ian Comley and Jay Cooper
**2023** (77th)	Guardians of the Galaxy Vol. 3	Theo Bialek, Stephane Ceretti, Alexis Wajsbrot and Guy Williams
**2023** (77th)	Mission: Impossible – Dead Reckoning Part One	Neil Corbould, Simone Coco, Jeff Sutherland and Alex Wuttke
**2023** (77th)	Napoleon	Henry Badgett, Neil Corbould, Charley Henley and Luc-Ewen Martin-Fenouillet
**2024** (78th)	**Dune: Part Two**	**Paul Lambert, Stephen James, Rhys Salcombe and Gerd Nefzer**
**2024** (78th)	Better Man	Luke Millar, David Clayton, Keith Herft and Peter Stubbs
**2024** (78th)	Gladiator II	Mark Bakowski, Neil Corbould, Nikki Penny, and Pietro Ponti
**2024** (78th)	Kingdom of the Planet of the Apes	Erik Winquist, Stephen Unterfranz, Paul Story and Rodney Burke
**2024** (78th)	Wicked	Pablo Helman, Jonathan Fawkner, Anthony Smith and Paul Corbould
**2025** (79th)	**Avatar: Fire and Ash**	**Joe Letteri, Richard Baneham, Daniel Barrett, and Eric Saindon**
**2025** (79th)	F1	Ryan Tudhope, Keith Alfred Dawson, Nicolas Chevallier, and Robert Harrington
**2025** (79th)	Frankenstein	Dennis Berardi, Ayo Burgess, Ivan Busquets, and José Granell
**2025** (79th)	How to Train Your Dragon	Christian Manz, Francois Lambert, Glen McIntosh, and Terry Palmer
**2025** (79th)	The Lost Bus	Charlie Noble, Brandon K. McLaughlin, and David Zaretti

== See also ==
- Academy Award for Best Visual Effects
- Critics' Choice Movie Award for Best Visual Effects
