= 43rd British Academy Film Awards =

1990 film awards ceremony

- Date: 11 March 1990
- Site: SEC Centre, Glasgow
- Hosted by: Magnus Magnusson; Sally Magnusson

Highlights
- Best Film: Dead Poets Society
- Best Actor: Daniel Day-Lewis; My Left Foot
- Best Actress: Pauline Collins; Shirley Valentine
- Most awards: The Adventures of Baron Munchausen and Mississippi Burning (3)
- Most nominations: Dangerous Liaisons (10)

The 43rd British Academy Film Awards, more commonly known as the BAFTAs, took place on 11 March 1990 at the SEC Centre in Glasgow, Scotland, honouring the best national and foreign films of 1989. Presented by the British Academy of Film and Television Arts, accolades were handed out for the best feature-length film and documentaries of any nationality that were screened at British cinemas in 1989.

Peter Weir's Dead Poets Society won the award for Best Film. Kenneth Branagh and Pauline Collins took home Best Actor and Actress, whilst Ray McAnally and Michelle Pfeiffer won in the supporting categories.

The ceremony was hosted by Magnus Magnusson and his daughter Sally Magnusson. Originally from Iceland, Magnusson was the first non-British host of the awards.

== Winners and nominees ==
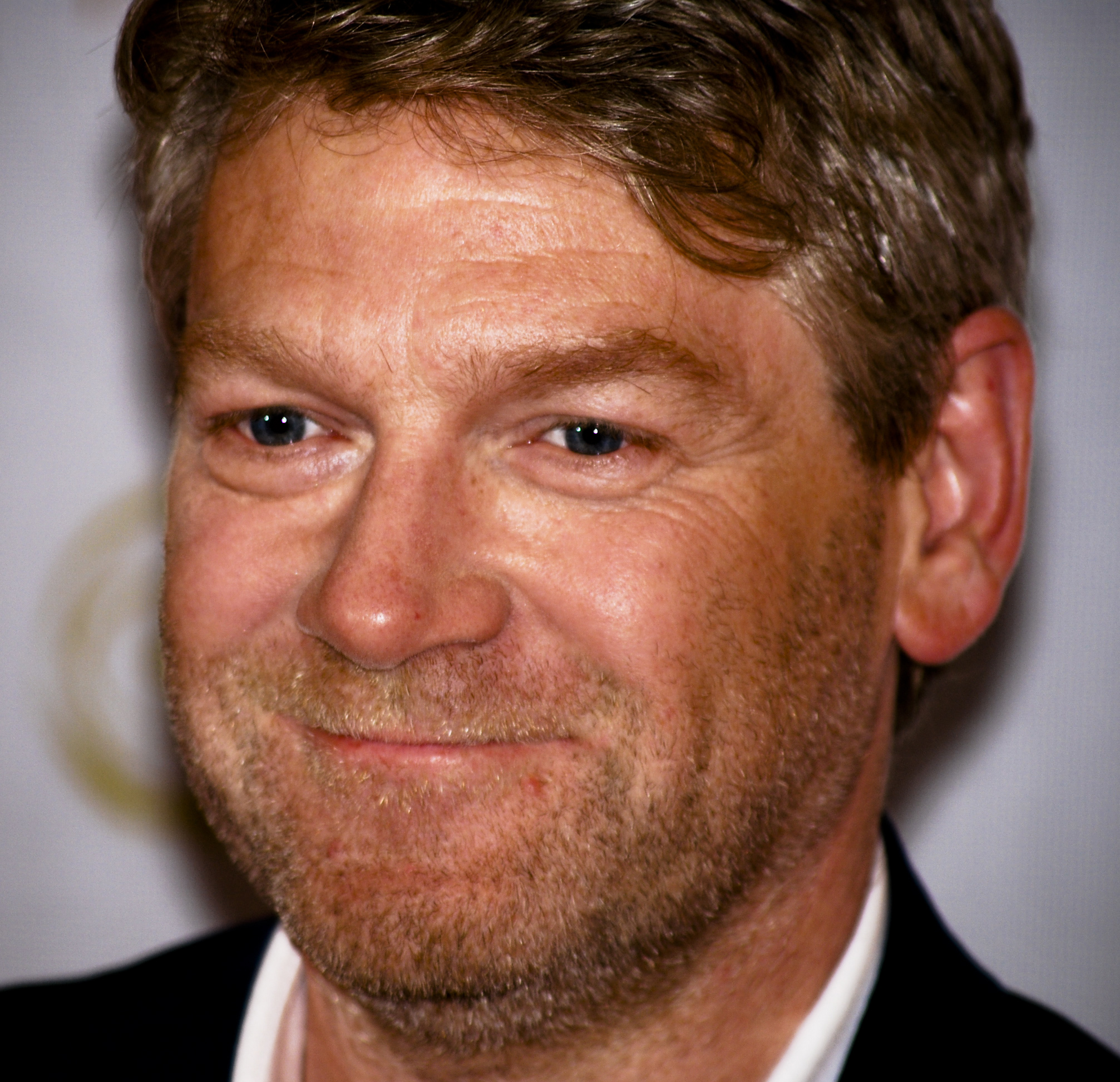
Kenneth Branagh, Best Director winner

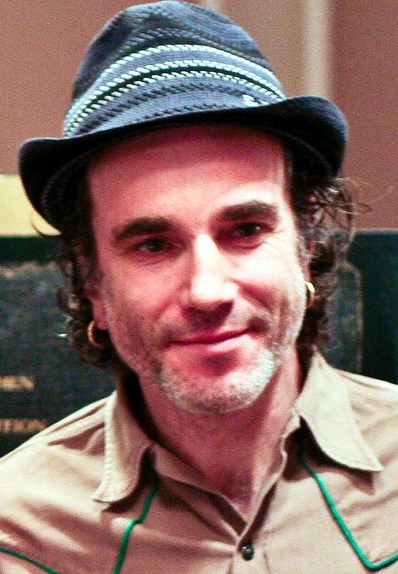
Daniel Day-Lewis, Best Actor winner

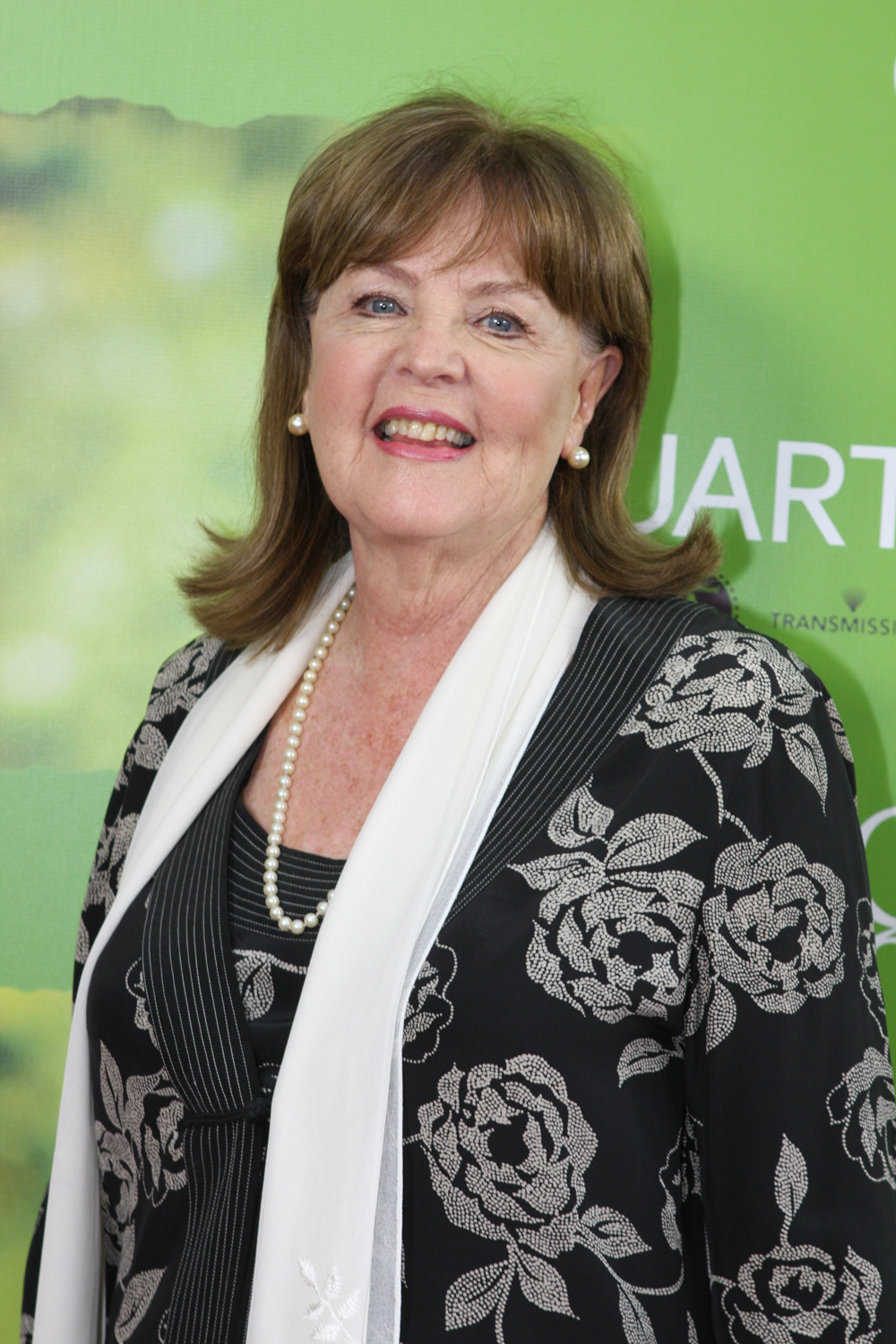
Pauline Collins, Best Actress winner

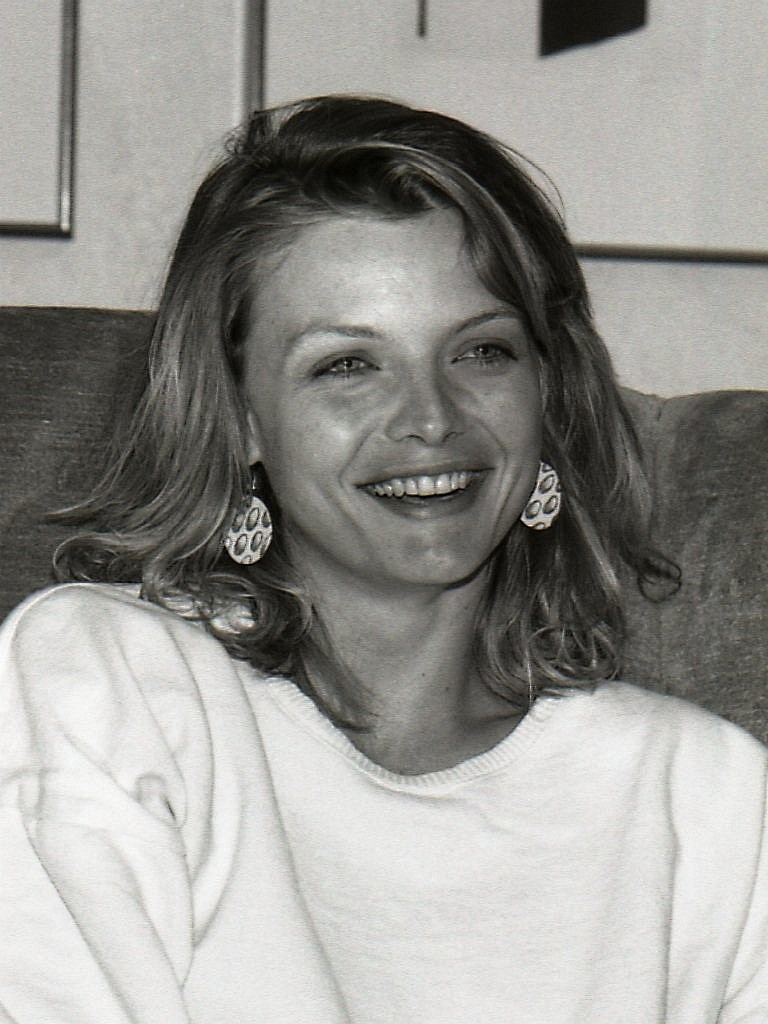
Michelle Pfeiffer, Best Supporting Actress winner

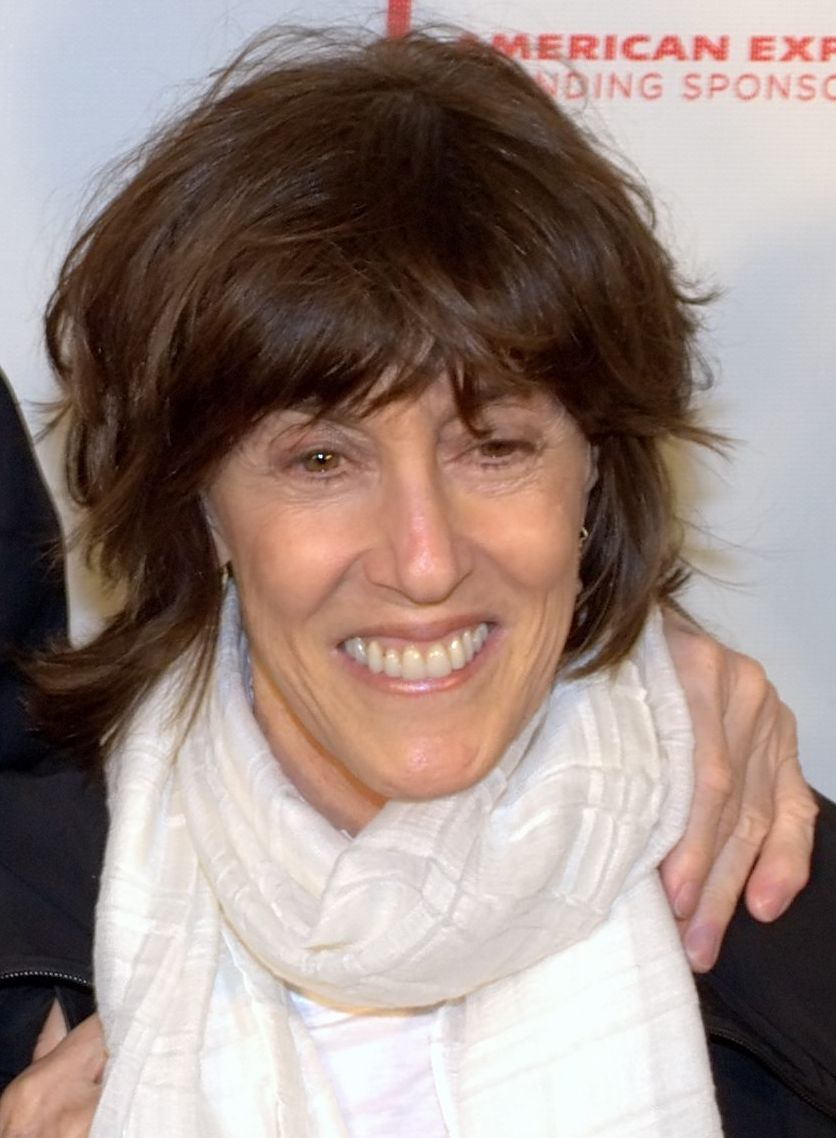
Nora Ephron, Best Original Screenplay winner

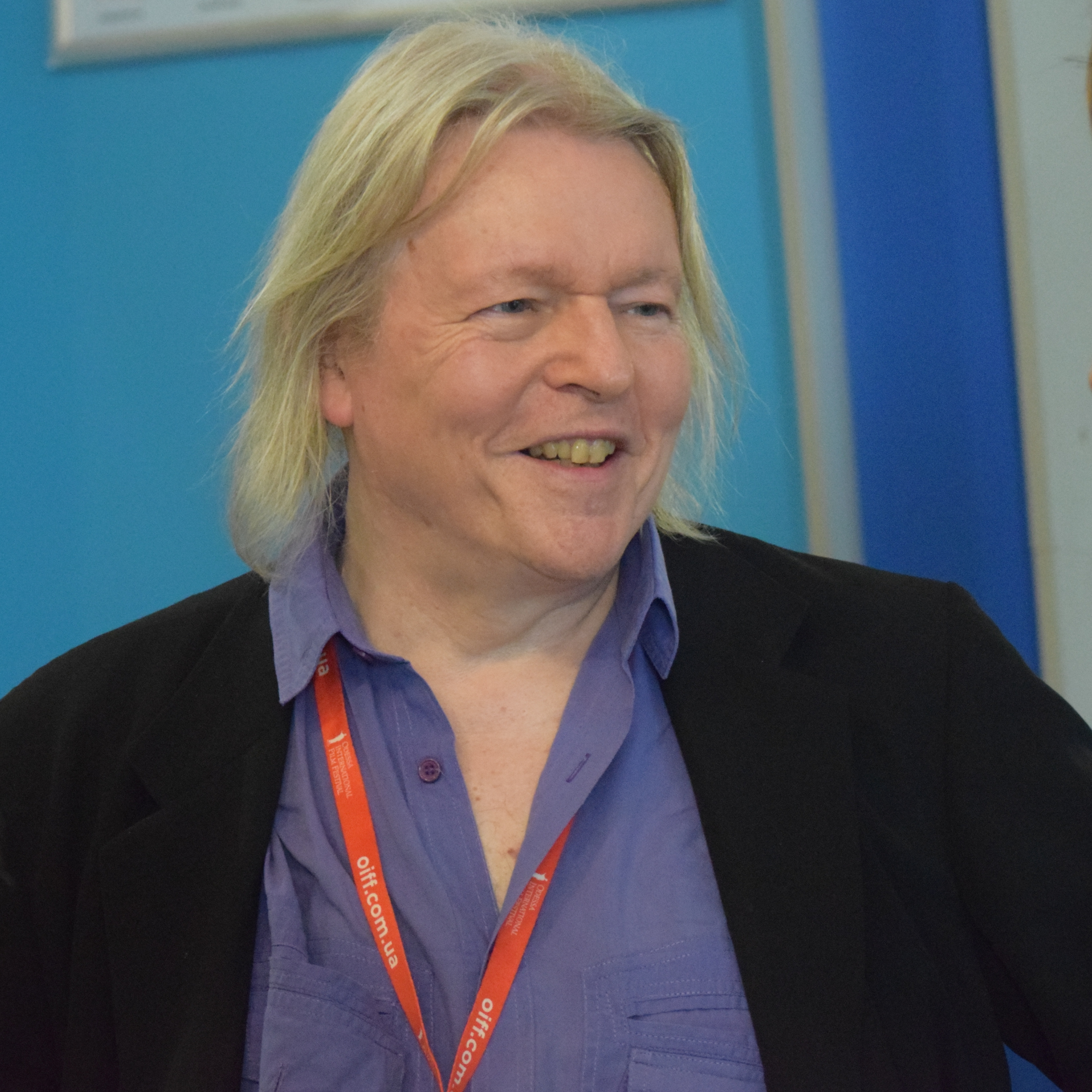
Christopher Hampton, Best Adapted Screenplay winner

=== Outstanding British Contribution to Cinema ===
- **Lewis Gilbert**

=== Awards ===
Winners are listed first and highlighted in boldface.

**Best Film**: **Dead Poets Society – Steven Haft, Paul Junger Witt, Tony Thomas and Peter Weir**; My Left Foot – Noel Pearson and Jim Sheridan; Shirley Valentine – Lewis Gilbert; When Harry Met Sally... – Rob Reiner	**Best Direction**: **Kenneth Branagh – Henry V**; Alan Parker – Mississippi Burning; Peter Weir – Dead Poets Society; Stephen Frears – Dangerous Liaisons
**Best Actor in a Leading Role**: **Daniel Day-Lewis – My Left Foot as Christy Brown**; Dustin Hoffman – Rain Man as Raymond Babbitt; Kenneth Branagh – Henry V as Henry V; Robin Williams – Dead Poets Society as John Keating	**Best Actress in a Leading Role**: **Pauline Collins – Shirley Valentine as Shirley Valentine**; Glenn Close – Dangerous Liaisons as Marquise Isabelle de Merteuil; Jodie Foster – The Accused as Sarah Tobias; Melanie Griffith – Working Girl as Tess McGill
**Best Actor in a Supporting Role**: **Ray McAnally – My Left Foot as Patrick Brown**; Jack Nicholson – Batman as Joker / Jack Napier; Marlon Brando – A Dry White Season as Ian McKenzie; Sean Connery – Indiana Jones and the Last Crusade as Henry Jones, Sr.	**Best Actress in a Supporting Role**: **Michelle Pfeiffer – Dangerous Liaisons as Madame Marie de Tourvel**; Laura San Giacomo – Sex, Lies, and Videotape as Cynthia Patrice Bishop; Peggy Ashcroft – Madame Sousatzka as Lady Emily; Sigourney Weaver – Working Girl as Katharine Parker
**Best Original Screenplay**: **When Harry Met Sally... – Nora Ephron**; Dead Poets Society – Tom Schulman; Rain Man – Ronald Bass and Barry Morrow; Sex, Lies, and Videotape – Steven Soderbergh	**Best Adapted Screenplay**: **Dangerous Liaisons – Christopher Hampton**; The Accidental Tourist – Frank Galati and Lawrence Kasdan; My Left Foot – Shane Connaughton and Jim Sheridan; Shirley Valentine – Willy Russell
**Best Cinematography**: **Mississippi Burning – Peter Biziou**; The Bear – Philippe Rousselot; Dangerous Liaisons – Philippe Rousselot; Gorillas in the Mist – John Seale; Henry V – Kenneth MacMillan	**Best Costume Design**: **The Adventures of Baron Munchausen – Gabriella Pescucci**; Batman – Bob Ringwood; Dangerous Liaisons – James Acheson; Henry V – Phyllis Dalton
**Best Editing**: **Mississippi Burning – Gerry Hambling**; Dangerous Liaisons – Mick Audsley; Dead Poets Society – William M. Anderson; Rain Man – Stu Linder	**Best Makeup and Hair**: **The Adventures of Baron Munchausen – Maggie Weston, Fabrizio Sforza and Pam Meager**; Batman – Paul Engelen and Nick Dudman; Dangerous Liaisons – Jean-Luc Russier; My Left Foot – Ken Jennings
**Best Original Music**: **Dead Poets Society – Maurice Jarre**; Dangerous Liaisons – George Fenton; Mississippi Burning – Trevor Jones; Working Girl – Carly Simon	**Best Production Design**: **The Adventures of Baron Munchausen – Dante Ferretti**; Batman – Anton Furst; Dangerous Liaisons – Stuart Craig; Henry V – Tim Harvey
**Best Sound**: **Mississippi Burning – Bill Phillips, Danny Michael, Robert J. Litt, Elliot Tyson and Rick Kline**; Batman – Don Sharpe, Tony Dawe and Bill Rowe; Henry V – Campbell Askew, David Crozier and Robin O'Donoghue; Indiana Jones and the Last Crusade – Richard Hymns, Tony Dawe, Ben Burtt, Gary Summers and Shawn Murphy	**Best Special Visual Effects**: **Back to the Future Part II – Ken Ralston, Michael Lantieri, John Bell and Steve Gawley**; The Adventures of Baron Munchausen – Kent Houston and Richard Conway; Batman – Derek Meddings and John Evans; Indiana Jones and the Last Crusade – George Gibbs, Michael J. McAlister, Mark Sullivan and John Ellis
**Best Documentary**: **First Tuesday: Four Hours in My Lai – Kevin Sim**; Everyman: Romania State of Fear – John Blake; Lost Children of the Empire – Joanna Mack and Mike Fox; Viewpoint 89: Cambodia Year 10: A Special Report by John Pilger – David Munro	**Best Film Not in the English Language**: **Life and Nothing But – René Cleitman and Bertrand Tavernier**; Pelle the Conqueror – Per Holst and Bille August; Salaam Bombay! – Mira Nair; Women on the Verge of a Nervous Breakdown – Agustín Almodóvar and Pedro Almodóvar
**Best Short Animation**: **A Grand Day Out – Nick Park**; Creature Comforts – Sara Mullock and Nick Park; Egoli – Karen Kelly; War Story – Sara Mullock and Peter Lord	**Best Short Film**: **The Candy Show – Peter Hewitt, David Freeman and Damian Jones**; Carmela Campo – Ariel Piluso, Carlos Toscano and Gabriel Enis; Tight Trousers – Metin Hüseyin and Elaine Donnelly; Uhloz – Isabelle Groulleart and Guy Jacques

== Statistics ==
Films that received multiple nominations
Nominations	Film
10	Dangerous Liaisons
6	Batman
6	Dead Poets Society
6	Henry V
5	Mississippi Burning
5	My Left Foot
4	The Adventures of Baron Munchausen
3	Indiana Jones and the Last Crusade
3	Rain Man
3	Shirley Valentine
3	Working Girl
2	Sex, Lies, and Videotape
2	When Harry Met Sally...

Films that received multiple awards
Awards	Film
3	The Adventures of Baron Munchausen
3	Mississippi Burning
2	Dangerous Liaisons
2	Dead Poets Society
2	My Left Foot

== See also ==
- 62nd Academy Awards
- 15th César Awards
- 42nd Directors Guild of America Awards
- 3rd European Film Awards
- 47th Golden Globe Awards
- 1st Golden Laurel Awards
- 10th Golden Raspberry Awards
- 4th Goya Awards
- 5th Independent Spirit Awards
- 16th Saturn Awards
- 42nd Writers Guild of America Awards
