= Special effects of The Empire Strikes Back =

The Empire Strikes Back (also known as Star Wars: Episode V – The Empire Strikes Back) is a 1980 American epic space opera film directed by Irvin Kershner, with a screenplay by Leigh Brackett and Lawrence Kasdan, based on a story by George Lucas. It is the sequel to Star Wars (1977), (Note: Later titled Star Wars: Episode IV – A New Hope) the second film in the Star Wars film series, and the fifth chronological chapter of the Skywalker Saga. Set three years after the events of Star Wars, its story follows the battle between the Galactic Empire led by Emperor Palpatine and the Rebel Alliance led by Princess Leia. Meanwhile, Luke Skywalker trains to master the Force so he can confront the Sith lord Darth Vader. The ensemble cast includes Mark Hamill, Harrison Ford, Carrie Fisher, Billy Dee Williams, Anthony Daniels, David Prowse, Kenny Baker, Peter Mayhew, and Frank Oz.

The development of the film began in 1977, shortly after the release of Star Wars. Lucas's own special effects company had effectively ceased to exist following the production of Star Wars and he decided to re-establish the company, moving it from central to northern California and building a new facility as its base. Construction began in mid-1978, and the crew operated out of the incomplete building to keep pace with Empire's filming schedule. Up to 100 people worked on the nearly 600 effects required for the film, which included miniatures, matte paintings, stop motion, articulated models, and full-size vehicles. Special effects-related expenses totalled $8 million, and the team was led by Richard Edlund and Brian Johnson to complete the effects.

== Development ==
=== Founding an effects studio ===
Development of The Empire Strikes Back began in 1977, shortly after the release of Star Wars in May. Creator George Lucas planned to use his earnings from that film to independently fund the sequel. However, Industrial Light & Magic (ILM), a makeshift special effects company formed by Lucas exclusively for Star Wars had shuttered after its release because Lucas had no immediate use for its equipment or staff. Most of the staff and equipment were used to found a separate effects company, Apogee, Inc., under Star Wars effects supervisor John Dykstra. Lucas had to re-establish ILM and completely re-staff it while managing his burgeoning production firm Lucasfilm. He also wanted to move ILM from southern California to San Rafael in the north. He liked the area, but it was a substantial distance away from the busy film activity and experienced crew in Los Angeles.

Recruitment occurred over several months from late 1977 onwards. Fewer than 20 Star Wars special effects crew members followed ILM's move to San Rafael, seven of whom were key, including Richard Edlund and Dennis Muren. Empire's producer Gary Kurtz hired crew including production designer Norman Reynolds, consultant John Barry, makeup artist Stuart Freeborn, and first assistant director David Tomblin. Lucas brought back artists Ralph McQuarrie and Joe Johnston to maintain visual consistency with Star Wars, and the trio began to conceptualize the snow battle in December. Lucas found concept work easier for Empire because the crew did not need to create completely new cultures or worry about "what sort of coffee cups they would use". Even so, pre-production progressed slowly because Lucas operated out of north California and the crew had not moved closer to him, which made it difficult for him to check their work.

Construction of the ILM facility began in mid-1978, and crew began to work out of it from September while it was still in progress. Muren recounted that the walls were still being installed and there was no electricity. It took eight months to complete the facility, while crew operated the only two cameras available for filming under makeshift lighting. By late 1978, Phil Tippett, Nilo Rodis-Jamero, Paul Huston, and Steve Gawley were added to the team. The facility was eventually staffed with 90–100 people sometimes working 15-hour shifts as they attempted to meet Lucas's shifting design ideas. Tippet admitted that he and many of the crew were burnt out towards the end of the project.

Muren, Ken Ralston, Don Dow, and Jim Veilleux, among others, began filming effects work in full from February 1979 while ILM's electricity was being installed. Work on the film's approximately 600 special effects shots (compared to 360 on Star Wars) had to be completed by March 31, 1980, ready for the film's May release. In total, ILM accounted for $8 million of the film's $30.5 million budget.

=== Crew ===
The film crew for The Empire Strikes Back included:

- Nick Allder (Mechanical effects supervisor)
- Jon Berg (Stop-motion animation)
- Doug Beswick (Stop-motion animation)
- Ben Burtt (Sound design/supervising sound effects)
- Leslie Dilley (Visual effects art director)
- Richard Edlund (Special visual effects) (Note: Brian Johnson and Richard Edlund share supervisor credit for the film. Edlund was in charge of effects at Industrial Light & Magic, and Johnson managed effects production in London and Norway.)
- Harrison Ellenshaw (Matte painting supervisor)
- Michael Ford (Visual effects art director)
- Stuart Freeborn (Makeup and special creature design)
- Wendy Froud (Yoda fabrication)
- Steve Gawley (Modelshop foreman)
- Jerry L. Jeffress (Electronic systems design)
- Brian Johnson (Special visual effects)
- Joe Johnston (Visual effects art director)
- Michael Kelly (Visual effects editor)
- Peter Kuran (Animation/rotoscope supervisor)
- Harry Lange (Visual effects art director)
- Ralph McQuarrie (Design consultant/conceptual artist/matte painting artist)
- Dennis Muren (Miniature/optical effects photography supervisor)
- Bruce Nicholson (Optical photography supervisor)
- Michael Pangrazio (Matte painting artist)
- Lorne Peterson (Chief model maker)
- Ken Ralston (Optical effects cameraman)
- Norman Reynolds (Visual effects editor)
- Nilo Rodis-Jamero (Assistant art director)
- Tom St. Amand (Stop-motion animation)
- Peter Sutton (Sound design/supervising sound effects)
- Phil Tippett (Stop-motion animation)
- Alan Tomkins (Visual effects art director)

=== Sets and technology ===
Real locations were scouted for the film, including Central Africa and Kenya for the bog planet Dagobah, and Scandinavia for Hoth. To avoid the difficulties of shooting in distant locations, Lucas invested in practical sets; he funded the construction of a 1,250,000 cubic feet (35,000 m^{3}) "Star Wars stage" at Elstree Studios, London. Construction began at the end of August 1978 at a cost of $2 million. As principal photography was about to begin in January 1979, a fire on Elstree's Stage 3—where The Shining (1980) was being filmed—destroyed the planned space for Empire's sets. The impact was significant: it removed essential space and the production was forced to give up two more stages so The Shining could continue filming. Sixty-four sets had to be moved through nine stages and the timeline had to be rescheduled. Construction of the Star Wars stage was also impeded by poor weather, delaying construction of sets and necessary props. Sets were the single biggest budget expense at $3.5 million. The production was so expansive that by June 1979, the executive team had to ration the labor they could expend on building sets as there were no other tradespeople available in the industry, and it considered bringing workers in from Italy or Spain.

There was little equipment left to bring to the new ILM facility, including an optical printer, tracking camera, and a matte camera. About $1 million was spent setting up the facility, including $180,000 for construction, $27,000 for a high-speed VistaVision camera, and $50,000 for the design and construction of optical lenses. A further $1 million and about a year was spent on designing and building a state-of-the-art optical printer. Edlund believed it was essential to work on Empire and an investment in ILM's future technology, and he worked with George Rando and David Grafton to design the custom printer which is used for compositing images—for example, if there are three ships chasing the Millennium Falcon, all four crafts are filmed separately and composited together into a single scene. Edlund said that standard printers did not offer the visual quality they wanted and were more designed for basic effects like fades and dissolves. The printer's main feature was the four projector heads it had instead of the normal two, allowing more elements to be composited at once, which saved time and reduced the loss of quality over multiple passes of the same image. The printer lenses presented a clearer image than expected and they had to intentionally degrade about 35% of the shots to hide the now obvious effects.

There was a custom VistaVision camera built by the Mitchell Camera Corporation dubbed the "Empireflex" that produced footage twice the size of normal 35mm systems without the need to use 65mm film, which required more cumbersome equipment. Edlund said that starting with a larger image meant less quality was lost during compositing. It was small and portable, and could be programmed for certain motions, such as panning and tilting. It also had a specific stop motion mode that could hold on the current image and advance a frame while the shutter was open to create a blur effect. The majority of still shots or those with slight pans or tilts were performed with the Empireflex, while those with a lot of movement were done with a Dykstraflex because it had a mechanical arm that let the camera capture footage as if from the point-of-view of the Rebel spaceships.

Various techniques, including miniatures, stop motion, articulated models, full-size vehicles, and matte paintings, were used to create Empire's various effects. McQuarrie was responsible for over half of the matte paintings used in Empire, with the rest provided by Ellenshaw and Pangrazio. These were often done on glass and were being worked on as late as January 1980. The crew often worked up to 11 hours a day on mattes alone to generate the nearly 70 paintings required. Explosions were filmed at the San Francisco armory in Mission District. The building offered 80-foot (24 m) tall rooms that the crew built custom black ceilings in. The explosions were filmed at a high frame rate and composited into scenes where necessary.

== Hoth ==
=== On location ===
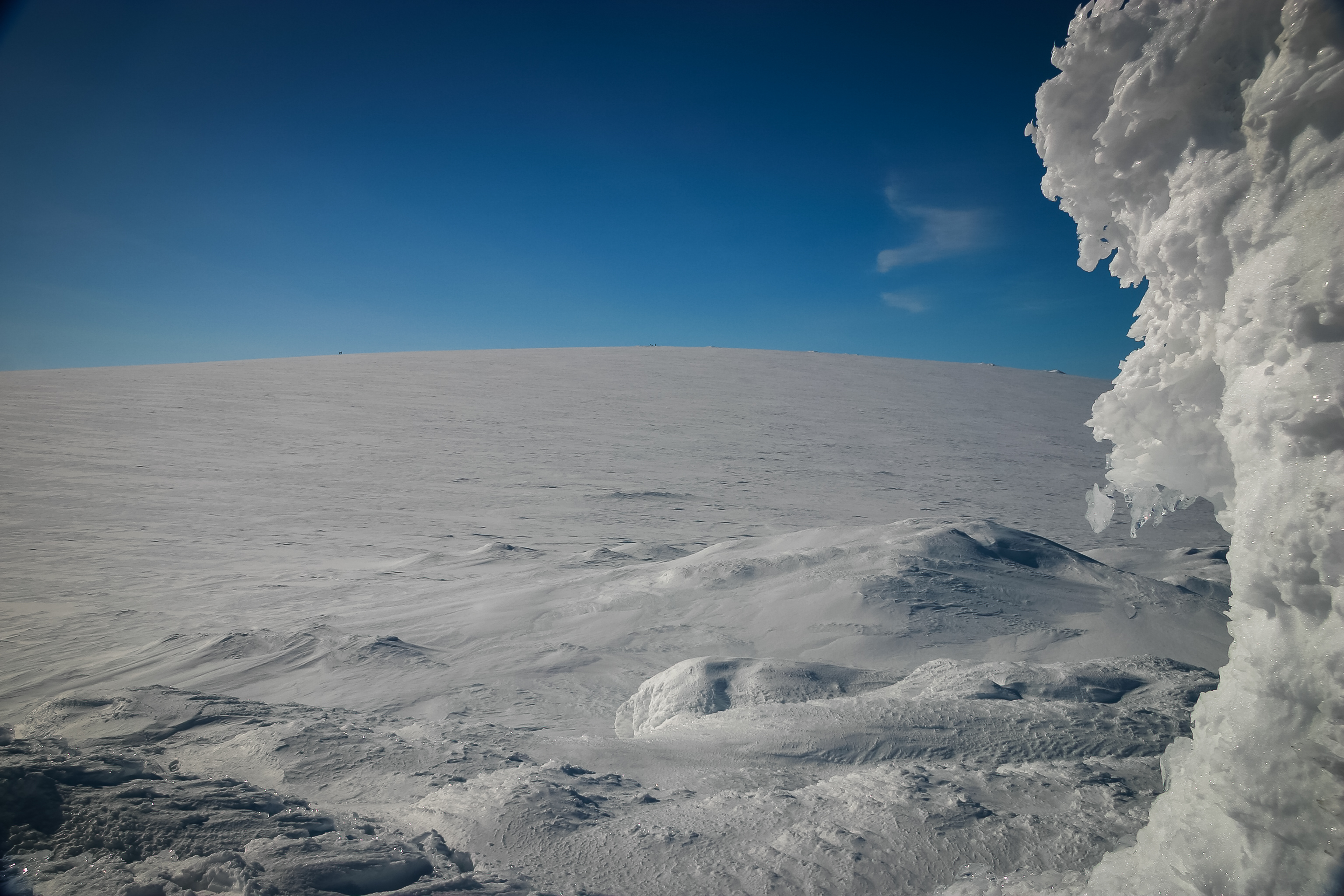
Hardangerjøkulen glacier pictured in 2007. It served as the exterior of the ice planet Hoth.

To portray Hoth's exterior, scouts looked at areas in Northern Europe such as Finland, Sweden, and the Arctic Circle. The locations needed to be free of trees and near populated areas for amenities. A 20th Century Fox employee recommended Finse, Norway. The recce crew, including Kurtz, Reynolds, and Kershner, flew to Finse on January 25, 1979, to begin receiving equipment containers sent by train or air. The construction crew arrived later, on February 25, to dig trenches for battle scenes. Filming the Hoth scenes on a set was considered, but had been deemed inauthentic. However, location filming coincided with the area's worst snowstorm in half a century, impeding the production with blizzards, 40 miles per hour (64 km/h) winds, and temperatures around −26 to −38 °F (−32 to −39 °C). The weather cleared only twice while filming; some days filming was impossible. The frigid conditions made the acetate film reel brittle, camera lenses ice over, and effects paint freeze in the tins. Snow also seeped into equipment. To counter this, lenses were kept cool, but the camera body was warmed to protect the film, battery, and the camera operators' hands. The crew was outside for up to 11 hours, subjected to thin air, limited visibility, and mild frostbite; one crewman slipped and broke two ribs.

Avalanches blocked direct transport links and quickly filled dug trenches with snow. Scenes could only be prepared a few hours in advance, and many scenes were filmed just outside the crew's hotel as the changing weather regularly altered the scenery. Production returned to England after a week, but the second unit remained through March to film explosions, incidental footage, and battle scenes. The opening sweeping shot of the area was captured by flying a helicopter 15,000 meters (49,000 ft) high and performing a controlled drop at a rate of 30 miles per hour (48 km/h) or 2,500 meters (8,200 ft) a minute. The shot was delayed four weeks to construct a heated shelter for the helicopter. The second unit, scheduled to be in Finse for three weeks, was there for eight. When the crew returned to London, they had only half the planned footage, including background plates for special effects shots that were uneven. The inconsistent weather meant some of the footage was overcast and some clear-skied.

=== Sets and costumes ===
Although the Star Wars stage was completed in early May 1979, it was too small to house the full-scale Rebel hangar and Dagobah sets, and an extension had to be funded and built. The hangar scene involved 77 Rebel extras, costing £2,000 per day. Around fifty tons of dendritic salt mixed with magnesium sulfate for a sparkle effect were used for the wintery set; the combination gave the cast and crew headaches. The medical unit where Luke recuperates was built by British Aerospace. It contained 400 US gallons (1,500 L) of chlorinated water and Hamill used a scuba-like apparatus to breathe. Cinematographer Peter Suschitszky wanted the tank to be the scene's main illumination point and positioned an army searchlight below it and a mirror above. After a few days of filming the heat shattered the mirror, sending a large shard through the water only moments before Hamill entered it.

The 9-foot (2.7 m) to 10-foot (3.0 m) tall Wampa beast costume was worn by Des Web using stilts; he had to be given air through a tube. Web filmed scenes on location and on sets but struggled to take more than a few steps in the suit before falling over. Deleted scenes depicted Wampas invading the Rebel base and attacking the Rebels and Imperial troops. A shot of a Wampa breaking through an ice wall failed because Web's arms reached only mid-way down those of the costume and he could not put enough strength into them to break it. They decided to remove the bottom of the wall so it would break easier, but lost control over how it would break. During post-production in January 1980, the rough cut of the Wampa's initial attack on Luke was deemed unacceptable; Ralston described the head built by Elstree as like a cuddly "owl" instead of something scary. Tippett built a miniature Wampa head and the team filmed it on a vacant lot with open sky as a background.

=== AT-AT Walkers ===
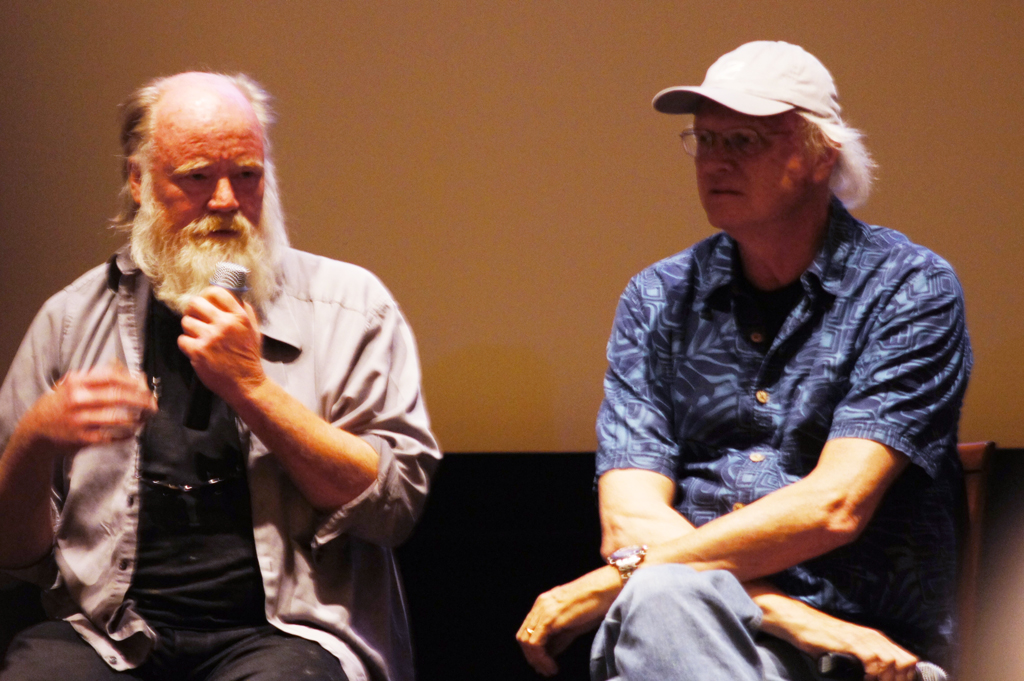
Phil Tippett and Dennis Muren in 2013. Muren helped storyboard the AT-AT Walker scenes which were animated using stop-motion by Tippett and Jon Berg.

Lucas and Kurtz knew there would be a battle on Hoth but had not considered what equipment the Empire would use. Lucas suggested using modified Norwegian army tanks and Joe Johnston based his early designs around them, but found them harder to disguise than a modified conventional vehicle. Johnston came across a U.S. Steel brochure about future applications of steel, featuring a walking tank design by Syd Mead. He suggested a bipedal tank but Lucas wanted something bigger. Johnston created new variations based on Mead's work, designs by McQuarrie, and was inspired by The War of the Worlds (1953) and the 1965 Walking Truck created by General Electric. He militarized his designs by giving the Walker a head and mounted weaponry. Lucas picked his preferred features from the designs, which led to Johnston finishing the AT-AT Walker.

Stop motion was chosen as the best option for animating the Walkers. In early February 1979, Tippett, Muren, and others spent $3,500 to film animals at a San Francisco zoo for movement references. An elephant served as the basis for the Walker animation, though Johnston wanted to retain some mechanical movement. Jon Berg was primarily responsible for building and animating the Walkers. He spent approximately 13 months working up to 14 hours a day to build the prototype in his own workshop, as ILM remained unfinished. He modified Johnston's designs where it would make the model difficult to manipulate and developed a series of pistons and cams concealed within the Walker legs that would make it easier to animate. Berg also added design embellishments such as guns with recoil.

Tom St. Amand built three main armatures from the prototype; each measured about 18 by 20 inches. The main body was cast in urethane and painted by Nilo Rodis-Jamero. The joints were secured tightly to compensate for the models' weight, but had to be loosened to animate it. Each joint was designed to move very slightly: approximately a fraction of an inch per frame. The Walkers were secured to the set with a pop-pin system that provided structural support and was quicker to release compared to a traditional tie-down system—threaded rods and wing nuts that lock the model to the surface. A small bipedal version dubbed the "chickenwalker" was built by Johnston out of plastic. Lucas liked it, but time constraints prevented them from building a detailed model, so parts of Johnston's model were glued to an armature built by Berg and Amand. $80,000–$100,000 was spent on the Walkers' development and build.

In July 1979, Muren began storyboarding the Walker scenes. Phil Tippett assisted Berg during the animation of up to three Walkers. Doug Beswick also helped once it became clear the task was too much for only two animators; Beswick animated Walkers near the background of shots. Some of the distant Walkers were 8×10 polaroid cutouts with minor articulation in the legs, as it was a quicker alternative to spending a week making a full model. Beswick spent five days working up to six hours to produce about a second of footage per hour. Berg and Tippett employed a Lyon-Lamb Video Animation system that recorded one frame at a time and could be played back immediately to quickly identify any flaws. Edlund filmed high-speed camera scenes such as the Walker falling over at about 96 frames per second to make the falling machinery seem heavier.

One of the most complex shots was a view of the Walkers through binoculars. The Walkers were filmed in VistaVision with a telephoto lens and the footage was projected onto a six-foot screen and photographed on tape using a Sony video camera, which added blurs and zooms. The tape was transferred back to film and a binocular-shaped matte, and digital readings were superimposed. Peter Kuran animated the ropes tying up the Walkers and Ralston animated the scene of Luke rappelling up to a Walker using a puppet. John van Vliet had hand-animated the sequence before they decided to use a puppet. A full-scale Walker underside was built for the following scene in which Luke throws an explosive into its body. A larger miniature, about 4 feet (1.2 m) tall and weighing 90 pounds (41 kg) was used for the explosion. Animating it was difficult because the legs were not strong enough to support the body's weight. A ratchet system that could electronically release and collapse the Walker was installed in the legs, but its weight broke the ratchets. There were three planned shots of the Walker falling, but difficulties resulted in only two being filmed. The scene was not the intended end of the Walker segment, but because the footage of Luke running towards the Walker had been shot in overcast weather, a decision was made to end it there to maintain consistency with the weather in earlier scenes.

Rodis-Jamero was mainly responsible for constructing the miniature snow set. Baking soda was used for snow because Berg wanted it to crunch below the Walkers. The soda made the surface easily disturbed, and the animators had to be careful not to bump the set or risk creating inconsistencies. Surgical masks were worn to reduce inhalation. Trap doors were built for the animators to reach the models and concealed with glued-on baking soda. Bluescreen was considered for the miniature backgrounds, but the Finse footage was unorganized, and only about 20 shots had been filmed when 80 were needed between the Walkers and speeders. Ralston tried cutting pieces of the footage together, but he could not conceal the matte lines. Rear projection likewise was rejected because it had potential technical issues. Muren used painted backgrounds, apart from some bluescreen shots used for people running in the foreground. A scene of Rebels running away from Walkers in the background was difficult to accomplish. The crew started with the footage of people running towards the camera to determine the appropriate angle for the background Walkers; Kuran provided some ground mattes to ensure it looked like the Walkers were touching the ground. Pangrazio painted about 15 backgrounds measuring up to 35 feet (11 m) wide and 12 feet (3.7 m) high, apart from the initial wide shot of the Walkers that was done by McQuarrie. To make the scene appear naturally lit, each Walker was separated from the other by a layer of scrim to make them seem further apart, and different diffused lights were applied to the models. About 10–12 months were spent to design, build, and test the sets and models, with another two months to film the scenes.

=== Tauntaun ===
Phil Tippett during the production of The Empire Strikes Back, observing a tauntaun miniature built for stop-motion animation

Up until January 1980, a shot of Luke riding his tauntaun mount on Hoth was intended to open Empire, but Lucas made a last-minute change to have the film open in space instead. Lucas also wanted a two-legged creature akin to a large rat, so Johnston and McQuarrie produced several designs: Johnston's was mammalian and covered in fur, and McQuarrie's was like a rat with human legs, which was deemed impractical. Various approaches were considered for realizing the creature, including using a person in a costume. On a July 1978 visit to ILM, Tippett saw their plans and agreed they would not work. He had sculpted a miniature tauntaun concept to use in stop-motion instead; a full-scale costume was used for close-ups. Tippett believed relying entirely on full-scale would make the effect obvious. McQuarrie and Johnston deferred to Tippett's core design thereafter. When Tippett moved to ILM in September, Lucas and McQuarrie were still refining the concept. Tippett's ideas included creatures akin to dragons, fleas, frogs, and horses. It was a collaborative process with Lucas, Kurtz, and Kershner providing input. Specifically, they wanted Tippett's design to be dirty and lived-in, instead of clean and manufactured, with a hairy head and talons.

Tippett's model was completed in September after he discovered leather from calves that had died in the womb of slaughtered cows. The material had very fine and small-napped hair that Tippett could separate from the leather in a water-soluble glue, and replace it with stretchy rubber, creating flexible, hairy skin. The Elstree crew urgently needed the design finalization in order to build the full-scale costume, so Tippett sent them a 12-inch sculpted mockup of this design. The design was returned with practical and aesthetic changes including a longer tail. Tippett said the final design, combining a llama head, kangaroo body, and ibex tusks, was essentially his but more mammalian.

A prototype armature, built by Berg and Amand, was cast in rubber and calf-hair for animation tests in February 1979. A more sophisticated armature was developed by Beswick and Amand out of aluminum to be lightweight. Amand built the upper torso to operate with ball-and-socket joints and Beswick built the lower body using a system of hinges. Ball-and-socket joints were more flexible but could drift from a set position or seize, requiring the puppet to be cut open to fix. Hinges were less flexible but offered smoother movement. Tippett said they used anything that would work. Only one final model that measured 16 inches tall was made and completed by August. A horse was chosen as its movement model because the tauntaun galloped; a horse and rider were photographed along Stinson Beach, California, to understand its gait and movement traits.

Tippett began animating the creature in January 1980. Attempts had been made earlier but needed revisions due to various technical issues that meant six-hour filming sessions were wasted. Twelve tauntaun shots were needed, including the opening aerial shot and the Rebel hangar. These shots were considered more difficult because filming against a bluescreen before the background was composited gave the animator no reference for where the scenery would be.

To make the animation look smoother Tippett came up with a modernized version of go motion, a process that adds motion blur to the puppets' movements.

The shot combining the miniature with helicopter footage from Finse was one of the most difficult. The helicopter footage was filmed with a gyrostabilized Wescam, but from varying angles against a barren snowscape with few reference points. Sam Comstock calculated the correct viewing angle for the tauntaun in relation to every movement and angle of the live-action footage. Tippett animated the creature based on this analysis to add a gradual tilt. Comstock rephotographed Tippett's footage and created a zoom-in effect using an oxberry animation stand, gradually moving its camera toward the footage in small increments. This and the Finse footage were composited together for the final shot. Comstock estimated the calculations necessary took 65 hours to produce 10 seconds of footage. The shot of the tauntaun running into the Rebel hangar was also difficult. It was filmed on a black-and-white print stock on a darker background, which helped conceal the matte lines at the expense of being partially transparent. Muren noted in the original negative, this flaw resulted in the hangar lights shining through the creature; because it was a short segment, it was ignored. Several additional tauntaun scenes were cut for different reasons, including an elaborate clip of Han Solo riding it in the snow.

The 8-foot (2.4 m) tall full-scale tauntaun was built at Elstree's prop department. Two heads were constructed; one was articulated to move its neck, eyes, snort, and it simulated breathing via gas pipes fed into the head. The body had very limited mobility and could not walk. Muren believed it looked artificial because the eyes looked dead. The entire costume had to be flown out to Finse for filming.

== Dagobah ==
The expansive Dagobah set was built in half the allotted time due to schedule overrun. It was built on a raised frame to allow puppeteers access from below, was constructed from tons of plaster and scrim, covered in real mud and flora, and featured a river.

Initially planned for the destroyed Stage 3, the Dagobah set was built on the Star Wars stage. Fourteen weeks were originally allocated for its construction, but since filming was significantly overscheduled alongside rising production costs, it had to be completed in seven, requiring the crew to work overtime on nights and weekends. The set was 65 feet (20 m) by 45 feet (14 m) by 3 feet (0.91 m), and was constructed on a raised steel frame from 112 short tons (100 long tons) of plaster laden with 48,000 metres (52,000 yd) of scrim, which included about 24 trees that weighed 4–5 short tons (3.6–4.5 long tons) each, with cutout trees inserted in-between for detail. The trees (designed by McQuarrie) were based on those found in Louisiana swamps. He depicted them as immense petrified trees with roots exposed by years of local activity; the roots were designed to look like muscular but sinuous insect legs. The set included an artificial river and a 3-foot (0.91 m) deep lake; the water became stagnant after weeks of filming. To enhance the realism, the set was covered in mud and flora, and the artificial trees were generally fixed in position and shot around. The set's scale was big enough that Luke's full-scale X-Wing ship could be partially submerged on the lakeshore. The whole area was surrounded by a 450-foot (140 m) wide, 44-foot (13 m) tall backdrop. Artificial smoke was used for fog and mist.

Snakes, such as anacondas, pythons, boa constrictors, and kingsnakes, were used on the set, but they attracted spiders, insects, and birds. A scene in which Hamill grabs a snake to symbolize his struggle with the dark side of the Force was cut after the snake bit him following several takes. The use of an alligator was planned—the trainers put it on Hamill's lap without warning—but the idea was dropped. Ralston stop-motion animated some birds built by Tippett.

For the scene in which Luke decapitates a vision of Vader, a specially rigged mannequin was used. A mold of Hamill's face was made for when Vader's mask explodes open to reveal Luke's own. Guinness filmed his scene on Stage 4 against a black velvet backing in early September 1979; he was done in two hours. A combination of matte background and some foreground water, smoke, and a miniature X-Wing were used to depict Luke's craft almost fully submerged in the bog. The full-scale craft was raised on a block and tackle pulley system by two crewmen to depict Yoda raising the ship with the Force. A water hose was affixed above to add a dripping water effect. The final scene of Luke leaving was important to Kershner, and he wanted to heighten the emotion with lighting and wind effects. He was limited in what he could change because it had already been determined how Obi-Wan would later be composited into the scene. It took about 17 takes, more than any other scene he had done.

=== Yoda ===
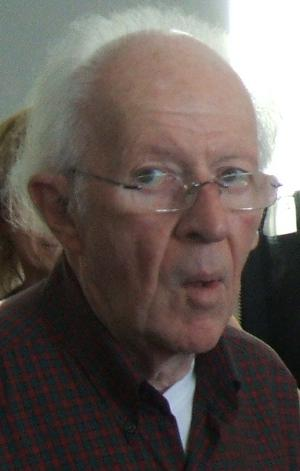
Ralph McQuarrie (pictured in 2008). McQuarrie was tasked with re-working the designs for the Yoda character by Joe Johnston, creating a design described as a mixture of a leprechaun, troll, and a gnome.

The Yoda character appeared in the film's original draft, described as a diminutive, frog-like creature called Minch Yoda. Various drafts refined the character—alternately named "the Critter", Minch, Buffy, and simply Yoda—from a slimy, repulsive creature to a small blue one; the character's long life and wisdom were consistent. Lucas's early outline described him as "Buffy very old—three or four thousand years. Kiber crystal in sword? Buffy shows Luke? Buffy the guardian. 'Feel not think.'" Johnston developed hundreds of designs, giving the character long legs or a furry body, from which Lucas picked out ideas to pursue. Around July 1978, design work was transferred to McQuarrie. He wanted a more ascetic design, as he believed Johnston's work made the character puffy and lack bone structure. The final design was described as a mixture of a leprechaun, troll, and a gnome. Kershner said "At first I thought Yoda should be eight or nine feet tall with a big beard, like an oversized Moses", but it was deemed cliché.

Bringing the character to life was difficult: using forced perspective on adults or little people to make them seem smaller was considered, but building big enough sets for the technique was too restrictive. Children were not considered to be disciplined enough to deal with the strenuous production, and Kershner said there was no "great" little person actor. Stop motion would have made him look like a cartoon, contemporary animatronics were not sophisticated enough, and the concept of using a monkey was dismissed by Freeborn who had learned during his work on A Space Odyssey (1968) that the animals tended to tear off costumes and prosthetics. Lucas spoke to his friend, puppeteer Jim Henson of The Muppets, who was busy on another project but recommended his co-puppeteer Frank Oz. Oz was hired as a puppeteer and his vocal performance was intended to be dubbed over, but Lucas believed that a voice actor could not match Oz's mannerisms with the puppet.

Stuart Freeborn, who had made many alien masks for Star Wars, was asked to create a design for Yoda before Lucas left for the United States later that day. Freeborn had a sculpture of his own head which he modified by adding wrinkles to the forehead to indicate wisdom, and eyes reminiscent of Albert Einstein to indicate intelligence. He considered adding a mustache but thought it would look strange, so he created the shape of one on the sculpture's lip; Lucas was happy with the result. Freeborn built clay sculptures and practice models to try out different facial features until a final design was decided upon. Wendy Froud, from Henson's company, helped Freeborn develop the physical puppet. A cast was made of Oz's arm to get the internal sizing right. Cables, hydraulics, electronics, and springs were used in Yoda's construction, as well as handmade silk for his clothes.

Work continued on the puppet up to the first morning of filming in August 1979. Oz recounted playing with the head during its construction and accidentally cracking it. Oz's puppetry controlled Yoda's mouth, brow, and palette. He was assisted by puppeteers Kathryn Mullen, David Barclay, and Froud in controlling aspects such as ears or a hand. Filming just a few lines of Yoda dialogue could take hours to ensure his movements were as desired. Kershner called it the film's greatest effect. Puppeteer Deep Roy walked on his knees in a Yoda costume for distant shots.

Oz controlled the Yoda puppet from beneath the set's steel frame. Hamill could not hear Oz through the set; earpieces were used to let them hear each other but the signal was unreliable. In the end, Hamill rehearsed with a speaker to get his timing right and performed his scenes without Yoda speaking. Hamill found his Dagobah scenes taxing because he was not acting with another person. To raise his morale, Oz surprised him with a performance by Miss Piggy who complained about having to work in this "dump". Hamill said only Kurtz and Kershner were not laughing because they did not want to lose any time filming. Once Oz left for a prior commitment, Hamill redid some scenes while replicating his positions in the existing Yoda footage.

== Other locations ==
=== Bespin ===
The Cloud City of Bespin was originally conceived for Star Wars and intended to be an Imperial prison. McQuarrie designed the city with rounded buildings because he believed if they were square they would look like the "Black Tower" at Universal City, California. He described the city as similar to his own work on Close Encounters of the Third Kind (1977), but also took inspiration from The Wizard of Oz (1939) and Radio Ranch (1940). Reynolds took over and designed the city interiors with a more crystalline shape because the round "Jell-O mold" forms McQuarrie wanted to use were deemed expensive and too difficult to build.

A lack of time meant a Cloud City miniature was discarded in favor of combining paintings, cut-out pieces, and 3D foreground elements. Edlund wanted a miniature and believed the matte ruined the illusion. The background sky footage was filmed by Johnson with an Astrovision camera from a Learjet. Kershner described the Millennium Falcon landing on the city as one of the most difficult effects. The scale landing platform and a large Falcon model from Star Wars were filmed from 64 feet (20 m) away to get the correct perspective and combined with a matte painting city by McQuarrie; Van Vliet animated the landing rockets.

Filming on the Cloud City sets began April 6, 1979. The duel between Darth Vader and Luke began filming in July on Stage 1. Animating lightsabers for the fight was deemed more difficult than doing the same on Star Wars. On the latter, the weapons had been covered in front-project material that could be animated later, but for Empire they knew they would be animated and so did not use the material. This made it difficult for the animators to plot the animation, especially when the sabers are moved around fast. Stunt double Bob Anderson stood in for David Prowse in the fight scene. Items were thrown at Hamill to represent Vader manipulating objects with the Force. A wood and metal "missile" was fired from an air cannon at the window behind Hamill to shatter it, risking real injury. The special effects team assumed all the glass would shatter away from him. His stunt double Colin Skeaping ran at the window, turned and performed a backward somersault to create the impression of Luke being sucked out. Vader's confession to being Luke's father on the reactor gantry was filmed about 30 feet (9.1 m) to 40 feet (12 m) off the ground, with mattresses placed on top of cardboard boxes to cushion Hamill's fall. Hamill described the most terrifying stunt as walking along the nine-inch wide platform to evade Vader. He fell only once but was able to roll on landing to avoid harm. McQuarrie painted the gantry background.

When Luke is hanging from an antenna beneath the city, Hamill was suspended by a thin safety wire about 40 feet (12 m) up. Ralston animated wide shots of Luke in the same position. The scene of Luke receiving a prosthetic hand following the duel was re-written by Kershner to show it reacting to stimuli. He believed it was important the audience knew the hand was not numb when Luke put his arm around Leia at the end.

=== Asteroid escape ===
The Millennium Falcon escape through an asteroid field was produced using miniatures. It was simplified from the original concept because test footage appeared too confusing and distracted from the action. Although some asteroids were built, Ralston suspended some potatoes on sticks for additional space rocks as it was difficult to tell during the fast pace. The scene is a composite of about twenty different objects, including the Falcon, TIE fighter ships, and individual meteors. Altogether, 100 pieces of film were used when accounting for aspects such as backgrounds and shadows.

A 30-foot (9.1 m) diameter meteor was built by Johnston, Pangrazio, and Chris Anderson, to house the space slug. Beswick built the slug using an aluminum armature with a spring on the jaws. It was designed to work as a hand puppet. Tippett designed and built its outside and it was puppeteered by Berg. The scene took about 50 takes over the course of a week. A larger-scale interior of the creature was made with a mechanized jaw to detail the Falcon's escape from its innards. Howie Hammerman's burps were recorded for the slug's voice.

== Ships, robots, and costumes ==
=== Ships ===
The full-scale Millennium Falcon, designed by Reynolds, measured 65 feet (20 m) in diameter and 80 feet (24 m) long, weighing 23 tons. Star Wars used a half-scale Falcon, but it was left exposed to the weather since filming and was unsalvageable. The full-scale version was constructed in 16 separable sections made from steel and wood so that it would be more durable, re-usable, and easier to take apart for storage. Each of the Falcon's feet housed compressed-air hoverboards, allowing it to be moved around. The construction was outsourced to Marcon Fabrications in Pembrokeshire and took about three months. The cockpit was designed and built larger than the original's to provide more space for the cast. Lucas was unhappy about this because the original was designed to resemble that of a jet fighter or rocket ship. Even so, the conditions were still cramped for the actors, and after long hours of filming Ford began sawing the wooden console in half in frustration.

For the Hoth Rebel speeder interiors, the British crew shot live-action cockpit scenes in front of a bluescreen so that an image could be composited later by ILM depicting approaching Walkers. To enhance the effect, Finse helicopter footage was used with several small Walkers matted in to create the appearance of vast distances without a substantially large set. Model shop workers Mike Fulmer and Charles Bailey fabricated several 1–2 inch Walkers from resin or metal when more detail and articulation were required. Luke's point-of-view shot as his speeder crashes was a combination of stop motion up to the point of impact and live-action thereafter. A sled with a plexiglass front slid down a luge into snow to complete the effect. External shots of speeders were miniatures filmed in motion control and composited into the footage. The build of the speeders was outsourced to Ogle Design Limited because of time constraints.

Vader's Star Destroyer, the Executor, was 6 feet (1.8 m) long, had between 150,000 and 250,000 lights installed, and cost around $42,000. The quantity of lights required a long exposure per frame shot, and the footage had to be reshot after review because it had illuminated the sawdust floating in the air. The interior bridge was built as a half-set and visually mirrored to appear as a larger area, looking out onto McQuarrie's matte starscape. Additional ship models included the 8-foot (2.4 m) to 10-foot (3.0 m) Star Destroyer (costing $50,000), Boba Fett's ship Slave 1 ($15,000), and the 18-inch diameter Millennium Falcon ($10,000). The Falcon model was about 2 feet (0.61 m) long and lighter than the Star Wars version, making it easier to manipulate. The Rebel ship in which Luke and Leia end the film was added late in development.

=== Robots ===
Johnson led the refinement of the R2-D2 costume. Eight R2-D2s were built in total; five of them were outsourced to the White Horse Toy Company in Oxfordshire, who formed them in fiberglass instead of aluminum to be lighter, and one was made to be waterproof. While the exterior shell was built at White Horse, the mechanisms were outsourced to a separate company. The remote-controlled units had a honeycomb-like epoxy and polyurethane core that made them tough but light, weighing about 32 pounds. One unit was used for experimentation. Their control mechanisms were built by Andrew Kelly.

Two units were built for Kenny Baker to sit inside and control; he used a radio to hear what was going on outside the units. He had a seat harness and more advanced controls, which allowed him to move forward and backward and move the head around without touching the hot electronics. They also had a remote-controlled third leg that could be raised or lowered. Anthony Daniels's C-3PO outfit was reduced to 11 parts from 20, making it lighter and smoothing out any sharp edges. The IG-88 bounty hunter robot was constructed and puppeteered by Bill Hargreaves.

The Imperial probe droid was designed by McQuarrie and improved by Johnston. The London team built a full-scale 8-foot (2.4 m) version at Elstree and planned to ship it to ILM for filming, but Lucas wanted to film it against snow so it was sent to Finse instead. The radio-controlled droid had lights and moving appendages, and appeared to float by being moved along tracks concealed in the snow. Amand animated the miniature version, which he found difficult due to its many moving parts.

To film its explosive landing on Hoth, eight sticks of dynamite were positioned on the glacier to capture the shot as the sun rose over the horizon. The filming crew had to wait for the weather to clear at the right time, and three to four cameras were positioned about half a mile away using telephoto lenses. The demolitions expert in charge accidentally knocked the battery pack out of his radio and did not receive the message to detonate the explosives; producer Jim Bloom had to run up the hill to speak to him, but the weather had shifted and they decided to detonate and capture the scenery as it was. The explosion was larger than expected, as the quantity of dynamite was overestimated due to the dampening effect of the snow.

=== Costumes and characters ===
The bounty hunter Boba Fett originated from an early idea for a force of super Stormtroopers, advanced combat troopers. McQuarrie and Johnston worked on his early designs, and gave him all-white armor and a poncho inspired by the Man with No Name from A Fistful of Dollars (1964). The costume was built by multiple people and modeled by editor Duwayne Dunham in June 1978. The all-white color scheme did not have the look they wanted, and when demonstrating the wrist-mounted flamethrower, Dunham's arm caught on fire from a propane leak. Johnston painted the armor to make it appear as if it was assembled from scavenged parts, and added trophies to represent Fett's victories. The suit also had a jet pack filled with carbon dioxide. Fett's actor, Jeremy Bulloch, did not audition for the role; he was hired because the costume fit him. It was uncomfortable and top-heavy, making it difficult to maintain his balance, and the mask often steamed up.

The Chewbacca costume, made of yak wool and mohair, weighed 15 pounds. Peter Mayhew had to carry an additional 35 pounds on his back for scenes where he holds C-3PO's broken body. Working in the high heat on sets sometimes approaching 90 °F (32 °C), Mayhew fell ill and was given a few days off to recover. There was no extensive casting for the Emperor. Clive Revill provided the character's voice while Marjorie Eaton physically portrayed the Emperor in test footage. The footage was unsatisfactory, and she was replaced by Elaine Baker in a full mask, created by Baker's husband Rick, that had the eyes blacked out. Chimpanzee eyes superimposed over the mask's, cat eyes, and assistant accountant Laura Crockett's eyes were also considered.

== Sound ==
To collect over 1,000 sounds needed for Empire, Ben Burtt and Randy Thom spent months traveling around the United States to record various activities. Sprocket Systems, the new sound department, was given $25,000 to complete their work, including $1,000 to build a 160-channel matrix switch pay and $5,000 in travel expenses. The sounds were generally recorded on Nagra quarter-inch machines that were just above consumer-quality equipment.

For Dagobah sounds, Burtt recorded sounds at a zoo that included general animal noises, gulls and other shorebirds, sea lions, dolphins, and raccoons in a bathtub; the bird sounds, when slowed down, created "spooky howls". A pump at a water treatment plant and walking in wet mud also contributed to the bog planet atmosphere. For the Walkers, the sound of metallic shears cutting metal and metallic stamping machines were used to create a "rhythmic" marching sound. Burtt added a squeaking knee joint using a dumpster bin lid. Other sounds included Burtt rolling his car down a hill with the engine turned off to record wind for Hoth, and sounds at the White Sands Missile Range, New Mexico, for the Hoth battle. The tauntaun is the down-pitched sound of an Asian sea otter.

Other sounds included a Boeing 707 jet recorded at the Oshkosh Airshow that represented the snowspeeders, and a World War II B-17 bomber. The electronic window mechanism in a Cadillac Eldorado was used for C-3PO's walking sounds, and metal wires being pulled were used to emulate a blaster. Thom went to two steel factories in California to obtain sounds for the torture room doors, and at the San Geronimo water facility he recorded doors, air hoses, hisses, squeaks, and pumps. Burtt also borrowed laboratory machine sounds from Ken Strickfaden that were used in Frankenstein (1931). Foghorn sounds from San Francisco Bay were mixed into the ambient noise of the Cloud City. About three months were spent on sound mixing.

== Reception and legacy ==
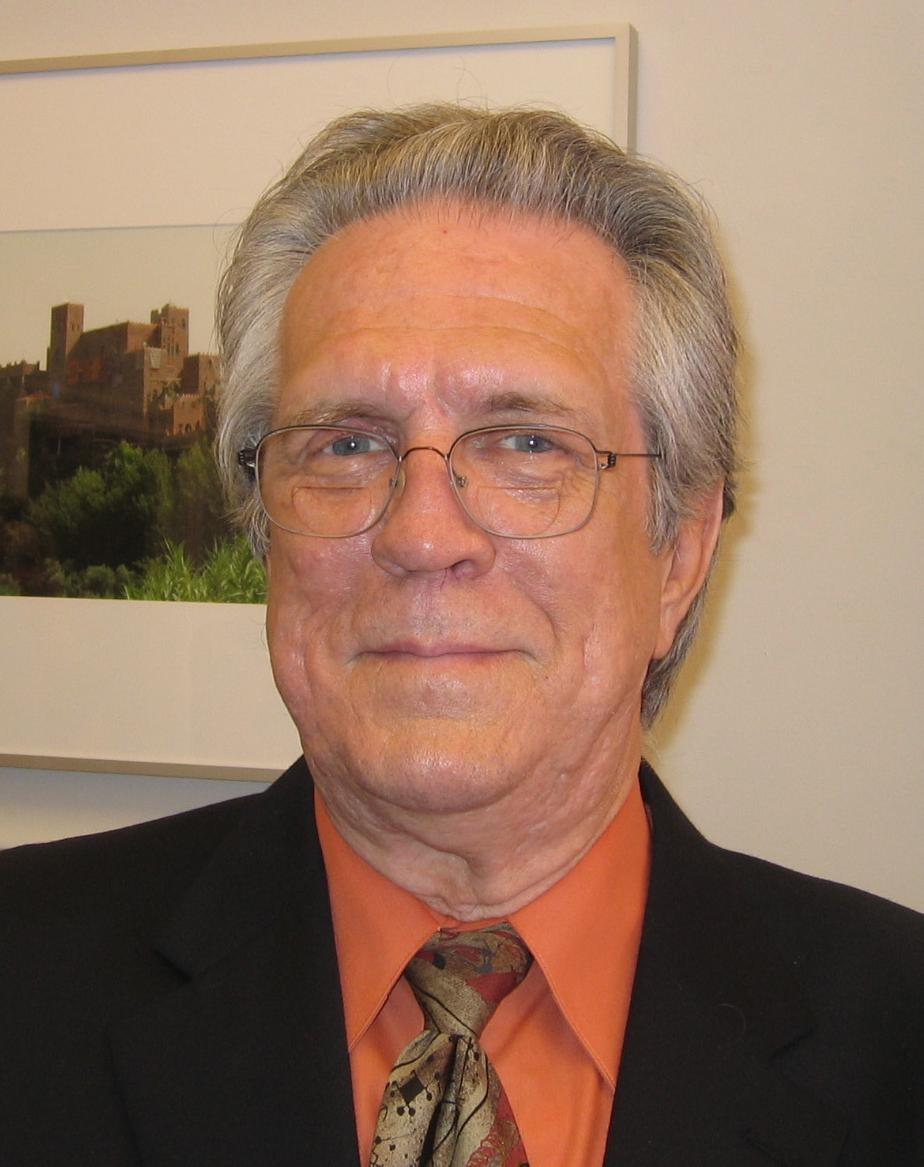
Richard Edlund (pictured in 2008), Brian Johnson, Dennis Muren, and Bruce Nicholson received the Special Achievement Academy Award for Best Visual Effects at the 1981 Academy Awards.

On its release, film critics praised the special effects, including Joy Gould Boyum who called lauded them as "breathtaking", Arthur Knight said they were "ingenious", and Gary Arnold called them visually dazzling. Jim Harwood wrote they were let down only by the competence of those in the original, which had been emulated by other films, lessening the impact of Empire's. Charles Champlin appreciated the effects were used to enhance scenes instead of being the focus. The Chicago Tribune's Gene Siskel said the non-human characters, including the robots and Chewbacca, remained the most lovable creatures, with the Yoda character being the film's highlight. Knight, Gould Boyum, and Arnold thought Yoda to be incredibly lifelike; Arnold considered his expressions so realistic that they believed an actor's face had been composited onto the puppet. Canby said the human cast was bland and non-descript, and even the robot characters offered diminishing enjoyment, but Yoda was a success when used sparingly.

At the 1981 Academy Awards, The Empire Strikes Back won the award for Best Sound (Bill Varney, Steve Maslow, Gregg Landaker, and Peter Sutton) and the Special Achievement Academy Award for Best Visual Effects (Brian Johnson, Richard Edlund, Dennis Muren, and Bruce Nicholson). The film also received a nomination for Best Art Direction (Norman Reynolds, Leslie Dilley, Harry Lange, Alan Tomkins, and Michael Ford). At the 34th British Academy Film Awards the film received two nominations: Best Sound (Sutton, Varney, and Burtt) and Best Production Design (Reynolds). At the 8th Saturn Awards, Empire received the award for Best Special Effects (Johnson and Edlund).

In the years since its release, The Empire Strikes Back remains an enduringly popular piece of cinema. Among other things it is considered groundbreaking for its special effects. Writing for CNN, Brian Lowry said that without the "groundwork laid by one of the best sequels ever, [the Star Wars franchise] wouldn't be the force that it is now". Yoda is also considered an iconic and enduringly popular character.
