= List of accolades received by James Bond films =

James Bond is a fictional character created by the novelist Ian Fleming in 1953. Bond is a British secret agent working for MI6 who also answers to his codename, ”007“. He has been portrayed on film by the actors Sean Connery, David Niven, George Lazenby, Roger Moore, Timothy Dalton, Pierce Brosnan and Daniel Craig, in twenty-seven productions. All the films but two were made by Eon Productions. Eon now holds the full adaptation rights to all of Fleming's Bond novels.

The films have won six competitive Academy Awards: to Norman Wanstall for Sound Effects (now Sound Editing) in Goldfinger (at the 37th Awards), to John Stears for Special Visual Effects in Thunderball (at the 38th Awards), to Per Hallberg and Karen Baker Landers for Sound Editing, to Adele and Paul Epworth for Original Song in Skyfall (at the 85th Awards), to Sam Smith and Jimmy Napes for Original Song in Spectre (at the 88th Awards), and to Billie Eillish and Finneas O'Connell for Original Song in No Time To Die (at the 94th Awards). Additionally, several of the songs produced for the films have been nominated for Academy Awards for Original Song, including Paul McCartney's "Live and Let Die", Carly Simon's "Nobody Does It Better" and Sheena Easton's "For Your Eyes Only".

In 1982, Eon co-founder & film series co-creator Albert R. Broccoli received the Academy's honorary Irving G. Thalberg Memorial Award, at that time a bust of its namesake but awarded at the main Oscar ceremony that year. In 2024, his successors Barbara Broccoli and Michael G. Wilson won the same honorary award; it had been moved by then to the separate Governors Awards ceremony (though they were also honored with a segment at the following Oscar ceremony in 2025), but they were the first recipients of that award to receive Oscar statuettes instead of the traditional Thalberg bust.

In 2013, Skyfall won a BAFTA Award for Best British Film and became the first James Bond film to receive a BAFTA Award in this category.

For the music to The Spy Who Loved Me, Marvin Hamlisch received Academy, Golden Globe and Grammy nominations but lost all to John Williams for his work for Star Wars: Episode IV – A New Hope.

== Academy Awards ==
Year	Category	Film	Nominee(s)	Result	Ref.
1965	Best Sound Effects	Goldfinger	Norman Wanstall	Won	
1966	Best Special Visual Effects	Thunderball	John Stears	Won	
1968	Best Song	Casino Royale	"The Look of Love" — Music by Burt Bacharach; Lyrics by Hal David	Nominated	
1972	Best Sound	Diamonds Are Forever	Gordon K. McCallum, John W. Mitchell and Alfred J. Overton	Nominated	
1974	Best Song	Live and Let Die	"Live and Let Die" — Music and Lyrics by Paul McCartney and Linda McCartney	Nominated	
1978	Best Art Direction	The Spy Who Loved Me	Art Direction: Ken Adam and Peter Lamont; Set Decoration: Hugh Scaife	Nominated	
1978	Best Original Score	The Spy Who Loved Me	Marvin Hamlisch	Nominated	
1978	Best Original Song	The Spy Who Loved Me	"Nobody Does It Better" – Music by Marvin Hamlisch; Lyrics by Carole Bayer Sager	Nominated	
1980	Best Visual Effects	Moonraker	Derek Meddings, Paul Wilson and John Evans	Nominated	
1982	Best Original Song	For Your Eyes Only	"For Your Eyes Only" – Music by Bill Conti; Lyrics by Mick Leeson	Nominated	
2013	Best Cinematography	Skyfall	Roger Deakins	Nominated	
2013	Best Original Score	Skyfall	Thomas Newman	Nominated	
2013	Best Original Song	Skyfall	"Skyfall" – Music and Lyrics by Adele Adkins and Paul Epworth	Won	
2013	Best Sound Mixing	Skyfall	Scott Millan, Greg P. Russell and Stuart Wilson	Nominated	
2013	Best Sound Editing	Skyfall	Per Hallberg and Karen Baker Landers	Won (Note: Tied with Paul N. J. Ottosson for Zero Dark Thirty.)	
2016	Best Original Song	Spectre	"Writing's on the Wall" – Music and Lyrics by Jimmy Napes and Sam Smith	Won	
2022	Best Original Song	No Time to Die	"No Time to Die" – Music and Lyrics by Billie Eilish and Finneas O'Connell	Won	
2022	Best Sound	No Time to Die	James Harrison, Simon Hayes, Paul Massey, Oliver Tarney and Mark Taylor	Nominated	
2022	Best Visual Effects	No Time to Die	Chris Corbould, Jonathan Fawkner, Joel Green and Charlie Noble	Nominated	

== Golden Globe Awards ==
Year	Category	Film	Nominee(s)	Result	Ref.
1964	New Star of the Year – Actress	Dr. No	Ursula Andress	Won (Note: Tied with Tippi Hedren for The Birds and Elke Sommer for The Prize.)	
1965	Best Song	From Russia with Love	"From Russia with Love" — Lyrics by Lionel Bart, Music by John Barry	Nominated	
1970	New Star of the Year – Actor	On Her Majesty's Secret Service	George Lazenby	Nominated	
1978	Best Original Score	The Spy Who Loved Me	Marvin Hamlisch and Carole Bayer Sager	Nominated	
1978	Best Original Song	The Spy Who Loved Me	"Nobody Does It Better" – Music by Marvin Hamlisch; Lyrics by Carole Bayer Sager	Nominated	
1982	Best Original Song	For Your Eyes Only	"For Your Eyes Only" – Music by Bill Conti; Lyrics by Mick Leeson	Nominated	
1984	Best Supporting Actress – Motion Picture	Never Say Never Again	Barbara Carrera	Nominated	
1986	Best Original Song	A View to a Kill	"A View to a Kill" — Music and Lyrics by Duran Duran and John Barry	Nominated	
1998	Best Original Song	Tomorrow Never Dies	"Tomorrow Never Dies" — Music and Lyrics by Sheryl Crow and Mitchell Froom	Nominated	
2003	Best Original Song	Die Another Day	"Die Another Day" — Music and Lyrics by Madonna; Lyrics by Mirwais Ahmadzaï	Nominated	
2013	Best Original Song	Skyfall	"Skyfall" — Music and Lyrics by Adele and Paul Epworth	Won	
2016	Best Original Song	Spectre	"Writing's on the Wall" — Music and Lyrics by Jimmy Napes and Sam Smith	Won	
2022	Best Original Song	No Time to Die	"No Time to Die" — Music and Lyrics by Billie Eilish and Finneas O'Connell	Won	

== BAFTA Awards ==
Year	Category	Film	Nominee(s)	Result	Ref.
1964	Best Cinematography – Colour	From Russia with Love	Ted Moore	Won	
1965	Best British Art Direction – Colour	Goldfinger	Ken Adam	Nominated	
1966	Best British Art Direction – Colour	Thunderball	Ken Adam	Nominated	
1968	Best British Art Direction – Colour	You Only Live Twice	Ken Adam	Nominated	
1968	Best British Costume Design – Colour	Casino Royale	Julie Harris	Nominated	
1978	Best Original Music	The Spy Who Loved Me	Marvin Hamlisch	Nominated	
1978	Best Production Design	The Spy Who Loved Me	Ken Adam	Nominated	
1996	Best Sound	GoldenEye	Jim Shields, David John, Graham V. Hartstone, John Hayward and Michael A. Carter	Nominated	
1996	Best Special Visual Effects	GoldenEye	Chris Corbould, Derek Meddings and Brian Smithies	Nominated	
2007	Outstanding British Film	Casino Royale	Michael G. Wilson, Barbara Broccoli, Martin Campbell, Neal Purvis, Robert Wade and Paul Haggis	Nominated	
2007	Best Actor in a Leading Role	Casino Royale	Daniel Craig	Nominated	
2007	Best Adapted Screenplay	Casino Royale	Neal Purvis, Robert Wade and Paul Haggis	Nominated	
2007	Best Cinematography	Casino Royale	Phil Méheux	Nominated	
2007	Best Editing	Casino Royale	Stuart Baird	Nominated	
2007	Best Original Music	Casino Royale	David Arnold	Nominated	
2007	Best Production Design	Casino Royale	Peter Lamont, Lee Sandales and Simon Wakefield	Nominated	
2007	Best Sound	Casino Royale	Chris Munro, Eddy Joseph, Mike Prestwood Smith, Martin Cantwell and Mark Taylor	Won	
2007	Best Special Visual Effects	Casino Royale	Steve Begg, Chris Corbould, John Paul Docherty and Ditch Boy	Nominated	
2009	Best Sound	Quantum of Solace	Eddy Joseph, Chris Munro, Mike Prestwood Smith, Mark Taylor and Jimmy Boyle	Nominated	
2009	Best Special Visual Effects	Quantum of Solace	Chris Corbould and Kevin Tod Haug	Nominated	
2013	Outstanding British Film	Skyfall	Sam Mendes, Michael G. Wilson, Barbara Broccoli, Neal Purvis, Robert Wade and John Logan	Won	
2013	Best Actor in a Supporting Role	Skyfall	Javier Bardem	Nominated	
2013	Best Actress in a Supporting Role	Skyfall	Judi Dench	Nominated	
2013	Best Cinematography	Skyfall	Roger Deakins	Nominated	
2013	Best Editing	Skyfall	Stuart Baird	Nominated	
2013	Best Original Music	Skyfall	Thomas Newman	Won	
2013	Best Production Design	Skyfall	Dennis Gassner and Anna Pinnock	Nominated	
2013	Best Sound	Skyfall	Stuart Wilson, Scott Millan, Greg P. Russell, Per Hallberg and Karen Baker Landers	Nominated	
2022	Outstanding British Film	No Time to Die	Cary Joji Fukunaga, Barbara Broccoli, Michael G. Wilson, Neal Purvis, Robert Wade and Phoebe Waller-Bridge	Nominated	
2022	Best Cinematography	No Time to Die	Linus Sandgren	Nominated	
2022	Best Editing	No Time to Die	Tom Cross and Elliot Graham	Won	
2022	Best Sound	No Time to Die	James Harrison, Simon Hayes, Paul Massey, Oliver Tarney and Mark Taylor	Nominated	
2022	Best Special Visual Effects	No Time to Die	Mark Bakowski, Chris Corbould, Joel Green and Charlie Noble	Nominated	

== Grammy Awards ==
Year	Category	Film	Soundtrack or song	Nominee(s)	Result	Ref.
1965	Best Original Score Written for a Motion Picture or Television Show	Goldfinger	Goldfinger	John Barry	Nominated	
1968	Best Original Score Written for a Motion Picture or a Television Show	Casino Royale	Casino Royale	Burt Bacharach	Nominated	
1974	Best Album of Best Original Score Written for a Motion Picture or a Television Special	Live and Let Die	Live and Let Die	Paul McCartney, Linda McCartney, George Martin	Nominated	
1978	Best Original Score Written for a Motion Picture or a Television Special	The Spy Who Loved Me	The Spy Who Loved Me	Marvin Hamlisch	Nominated	
1999	Best Song Written for a Motion Picture or for Television	Tomorrow Never Dies	"Tomorrow Never Dies"	Sheryl Crow & Mitchell Froom	Nominated	
2008	Best Song Written for a Motion Picture, Television or Other Visual Media	Casino Royale	"You Know My Name"	David Arnold & Chris Cornell	Nominated	
2014	Best Score Soundtrack for Visual Media	Skyfall	Skyfall	Thomas Newman	Won	
2014	Best Song Written for Visual Media	Skyfall	"Skyfall"	Adele Adkins & Paul Epworth	Won	
2021	Best Song Written for Visual Media	No Time to Die	"No Time to Die"	Billie Eilish O'Connell & Finneas O'Connell	Won	

== Saturn Awards ==
Year	Category	Film	Nominee(s)	Result	Ref.
1980	Best Science Fiction Film	Moonraker	Albert R. Broccoli	Nominated	
1980	Best Supporting Actor	Moonraker	Richard Kiel	Nominated	
1980	Best Special Effects	Moonraker	John Evans, John Richardson	Nominated	
1984	Best Fantasy Film	Octopussy	Albert R. Broccoli	Nominated	
1984	Best Supporting Actress	Octopussy	Maud Adams	Nominated	
1984	Best Fantasy Film	Never Say Never Again	Jack Schwartzman, Kevin McClory	Nominated	
1984	Best Special Effects	Never Say Never Again	Ian Wingrove	Nominated	
1986	Best Science Fiction Film	A View to a Kill	Albert R. Broccoli, Michael G. Wilson	Nominated	
1986	Best Supporting Actress	A View to a Kill	Grace Jones	Nominated	
1988	Best Fantasy Film	The Living Daylights	Albert R. Broccoli, Michael G. Wilson	Nominated	
1996	Best Action/Adventure Film	GoldenEye	Michael G. Wilson, Barbara Broccoli	Nominated	
1996	Best Actor	GoldenEye	Pierce Brosnan	Nominated	
1998	Best Action/Adventure/Thriller Film	Tomorrow Never Dies	Michael G. Wilson, Barbara Broccoli	Nominated	
1998	Best Actor	Tomorrow Never Dies	Pierce Brosnan	Won	
1998	Best Supporting Actress	Tomorrow Never Dies	Teri Hatcher	Nominated	
1998	Best Music	Tomorrow Never Dies	David Arnold	Nominated	
2000	Best Action/Adventure/Thriller Film	The World Is Not Enough	Michael G. Wilson, Barbara Broccoli	Nominated	
2003	Best Action/Adventure/Thriller Film	Die Another Day	Michael G. Wilson, Barbara Broccoli	Nominated	
2003	Best Actor	Die Another Day	Pierce Brosnan	Nominated	
2003	Best Supporting Actor	Die Another Day	Toby Stephens	Nominated	
2003	Best Supporting Actress	Die Another Day	Halle Berry	Nominated	
2003	Cinescape Genre Face of the Future Award — Female	Die Another Day	Rosamund Pike	Nominated	
2007	Best Action/Adventure/Thriller Film	Casino Royale	Michael G. Wilson, Barbara Broccoli	Won	
2007	Best Actor	Casino Royale	Daniel Craig	Nominated	
2007	Best Supporting Actress	Casino Royale	Eva Green	Nominated	
2007	Best Screenplay	Casino Royale	Neal Purvis, Robert Wade & Paul Haggis	Nominated	
2007	Best Music	Casino Royale	David Arnold	Nominated	
2009	Best Action/Adventure/Thriller Film	Quantum of Solace	Michael G. Wilson, Barbara Broccoli	Nominated	
2009	Best Supporting Actress	Quantum of Solace	Judi Dench	Nominated	
2009	Best Supporting Actress	Quantum of Solace	Olga Kurylenko	Nominated	
2013	Best Action or Adventure Film	Skyfall	Michael G. Wilson, Barbara Broccoli	Won	
2013	Best Actor	Skyfall	Daniel Craig	Nominated	
2013	Best Supporting Actor	Skyfall	Javier Bardem	Nominated	
2013	Best Supporting Actress	Skyfall	Judi Dench	Nominated	
2013	Best Music	Skyfall	Thomas Newman	Nominated	
2013	Best Editing	Skyfall	Stuart Baird and Kate Baird	Nominated	
2013	Best Make-up	Skyfall	Naomi Donne, Donald Mowat and Love Larson	Nominated	
2016	Best Action or Adventure Film	Spectre	Michael G. Wilson, Barbara Broccoli	Nominated	

== Sources ==
- Balio, Tino (1987). United Artists: The Company That Changed the Film Industry. Madison: University of Wisconsin Press. ISBN 978-0-299-11440-4.
- Block, Alex Ben; Autrey Wilson, Lucy (2010), George Lucas's Blockbusting: A Decade-by-Decade Survey of Timeless Movies Including Untold Secrets of Their Financial and Cultural Success, London: HarperCollins, ISBN 978-0-06-177889-6
- Chapman, James (2009). Licence To Thrill: A Cultural History of the James Bond Films. London: I.B. Tauris. ISBN 978-1-84511-515-9.
- Cork, John; Scivally, Bruce (2002), James Bond: The Legacy, London: Boxtree, ISBN 978-0-7522-6498-1
