= Brian Johnson (special effects artist) =

British special effects designer and director (1939–2026)

- Born: Brian Johncock; 29 June 1939; Surrey, England
- Died: 25 May 2026 (aged 86)
- Occupations: Special effects artist, film director
- Years active: 1957–2006
- Notable credit(s): Alien (1979); The Empire Strikes Back (1980)
- Television: Thunderbirds (1965–66); Space: 1999 (1975–78)
- Awards: Academy Award for Best Visual Effects (1980); Special Achievement Academy Award (1981); Saturn Award (1981); BAFTA Award (1987)

Brian Johnson (born Brian Johncock; 29 June 1939 – 25 May 2026) was a British designer and director of film and television special effects.

== Life and career ==
Brian Johnson was born in Surrey, England on 29 June 1939. Born Brian Johncock, he changed his surname to Johnson during the 1960s.

Joining the team of special effects artist Les Bowie, Johnson started his career behind the scenes for Bowie Films on productions such as On the Buses, and for Hammer Films. He is known for his special effects work on TV series including Thunderbirds (1965–66) and films including Alien (1979), for which he received the 1980 Academy Award for Best Visual Effects (shared with H. R. Giger, Carlo Rambaldi, Dennis Ayling and Nick Allder). Previously, he had built miniature spacecraft models for Stanley Kubrick's 1968 film 2001: A Space Odyssey.

Johnson's work on Space: 1999 influenced the effects of the Star Wars films of the 1970s and 1980s. Impressed by his work, George Lucas visited Johnson during the production of the TV series to offer him the role of effects supervisor for the 1977 film. Having already been commissioned for the second series of Space: 1999, Johnson was unable to accept at the time. He worked on the sequel, The Empire Strikes Back (1980), whose special effects were recognised in the form of a 1981 Special Achievement Academy Award (which Johnson shared with Richard Edlund, Dennis Muren and Bruce Nicholson).

Johnson died on 25 May 2026, aged 86.

== Awards ==
Johnson won Academy Awards for both Alien (1979) and The Empire Strikes Back (1980). He was further nominated for an Academy Award for his work on Dragonslayer (1981). In addition, Johnson was the recipient of a Saturn Award for The Empire Strikes Back and a BAFTA Award for James Cameron's Aliens.

== Filmography ==
=== Special effects ===
- Quatermass 2 (1957) (special effects assistant, uncredited)
- Kiss of the Vampire (1963) (special effects assistant, uncredited)
- Thunderbirds (TV series) (1965–66) (special effects director)
- 2001: A Space Odyssey (1968) (special effects assistant, uncredited)
- Moon Zero Two (1969) (special effects assistant, uncredited)
- Taste the Blood of Dracula (1970) (special effects) (as Brian Johncock)
- When Dinosaurs Ruled the Earth (1970) (special effects) (as Brian Johncock)
- A Clockwork Orange (1971) (special effects assistant, uncredited)
- Space: 1999 (TV series) (special effects—24 episodes, 1975–76; special effects director—24 episodes, 1976–78; special effects designer—18 episodes, 1976–78; special effect designer—6 episodes, 1976)
- The Day After Tomorrow (TV pilot, 1975) (special effects designer)
- The Medusa Touch (1978) (special effects supervisor)
- Revenge of the Pink Panther (1978) (special effects)
- Alien (1979) (special effects supervisor)
- The Empire Strikes Back (1980) (special effects supervisor)
- Dragonslayer (1981) (supervisor of special mechanical effects)
- The Pirates of Penzance (1983) (special effects supervisor)
- The NeverEnding Story (1984) (director of special effects)
- Spies Like Us (1985) (special effects supervisor)
- Aliens (1986) (special effects)
- Slipstream (1989) (special effects)
- Dragonheart (1996) (micro-light coordinator)
- Space Truckers (1996) (special effects supervisor)
- Dream Street (1999) (director)

=== Director ===
- Scragg 'n' Bones (2006)
