= Alex Henning =

Visual effects supervisor

- Occupation: Visual effects artist
- Years active: 2004-present

Alex Henning is a visual effects supervisor.

On January 24, 2012, he won an Oscar for the film Hugo at the 84th Academy Awards in the category of Best Visual Effects. His win was shared with Ben Grossmann, Robert Legato, and Joss Williams.
