= Gene Warren Jr. =

American visual effects artist (1941–2019)

- Born: Gene Francis Warren Jr. July 22, 1941; Los Angeles, California, U.S.
- Died: November 28, 2019 (aged 78); Hollywood Hills, California, U.S.
- Occupation: Visual effects artist
- Parent: Gene Warren (father)

Gene Francis Warren Jr. (July 22, 1941 – November 28, 2019) was an American visual effects artist. He won an Academy Award in the category Best Visual Effects for the film Terminator 2: Judgment Day.

Warren died on November 28, 2019 at his home in Hollywood Hills, California, at the age of 78.

== Selected filmography ==
- Terminator 2: Judgment Day (1991; co-won with Dennis Muren, Stan Winston and Robert Skotak)
