= George Gibbs (special effects artist) =

British special effects artist (1937–2020)

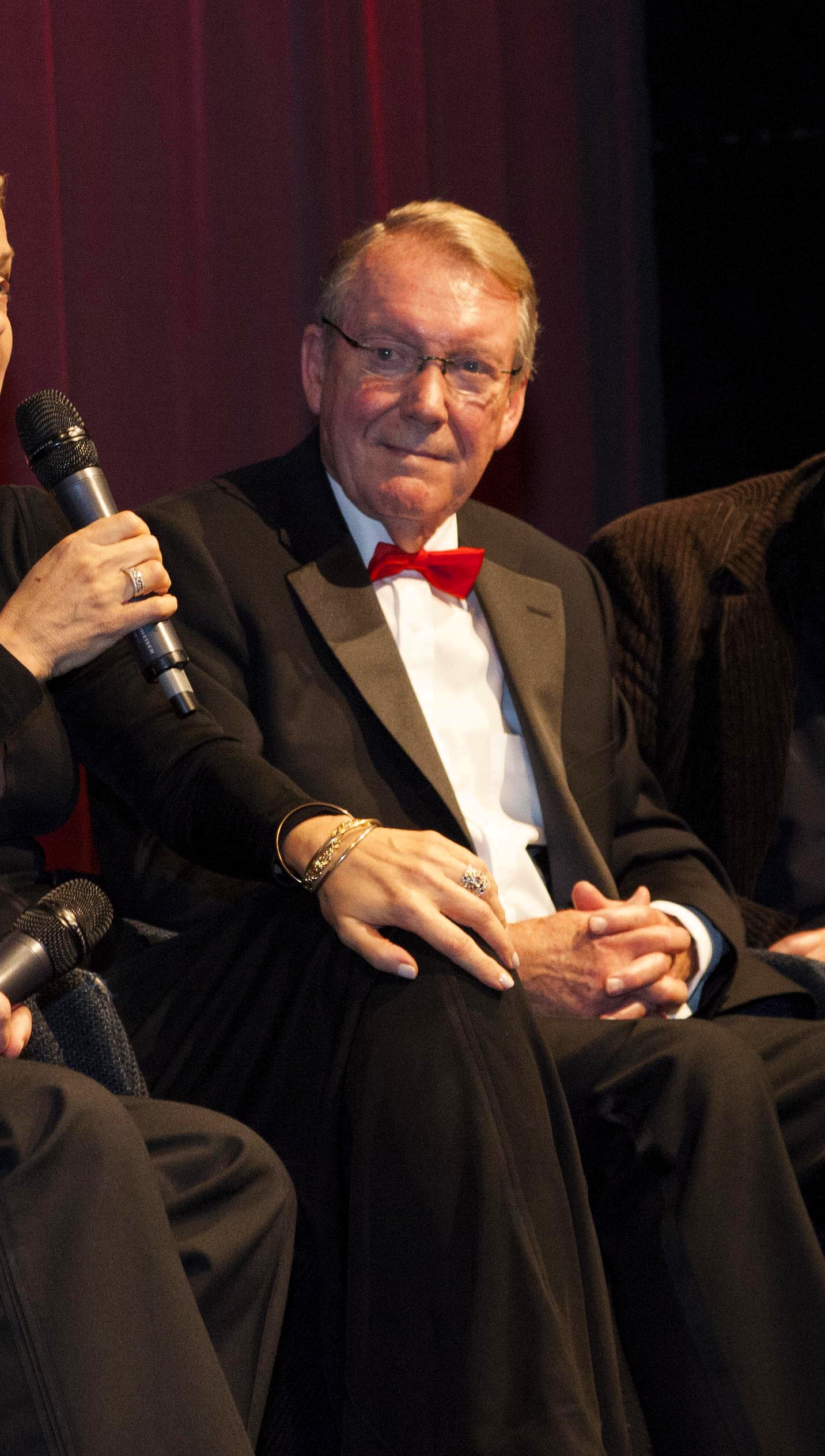
- Gibbs in 2015
- Born: 18 July 1937; Islington, London, England
- Died: 15 December 2020 (aged 83); England
- Occupation: Visual effects artist
- Years active: 1969–2005

George Gibbs (18 July 1937 – 15 December 2020) was a British special effects artist who is best known for his work in Indiana Jones and the Temple of Doom, Who Framed Roger Rabbit and Indiana Jones and the Last Crusade.

== Biography ==
Gibbs was born in Islington, London in 1937. In 1953, Gibbs started his career at his local theatre, the Hackney Empire in East London where he trained as a theatre electrician with Strand Electric Company. He worked in this line for 5 years until 1958, when he landed a job at Pinewood Film Studios.

He died on 15 December 2020.

== Oscar history ==
All these were for Best Visual Effects:

- 1984 Academy Awards-Indiana Jones and the Temple of Doom, award shared with Michael J. McAlister, Dennis Muren and Lorne Peterson. Won.
- 1988 Academy Awards-Who Framed Roger Rabbit, award shared with Edward Jones, Ken Ralston and Richard Williams. Won.
- 1992 Academy Awards-Alien³, nomination shared with Richard Edlund, Alec Gillis, Tom Woodruff Jr. Lost to Death Becomes Her.

== Selected filmography ==
- Doom (2005)
- The League of Extraordinary Gentlemen (2003)
- From Hell (2001)
- The Man in the Iron Mask (1998)
- The Saint (1997)
- 101 Dalmatians (1996)
- First Knight (1995)
- Alien³ (1992)
- Patriot Games (1992)
- Indiana Jones and the Last Crusade (1989)
- Who Framed Roger Rabbit (1988)
- Labyrinth (1986)
- Brazil (1985)
- Indiana Jones and the Temple of Doom (1984)
- Curse of the Pink Panther (1983)
- Monty Python's The Meaning of Life (1983)
- Conan the Barbarian (1982)
- Trail of the Pink Panther (1982)
- Flash Gordon (1980)
