= Lorne Peterson =

Canadian special effects artist

- Born: 20 October 1944 (age 81); Vancouver, British Columbia
- Occupation: Special effects artist
- Years active: 1977-present

Lorne Peterson is a Canadian special effects artist most known for the Indiana Jones and Star Wars films.

He won for Best Visual Effects at the 57th Academy Awards for his work on the film Indiana Jones and the Temple of Doom. He shared his Oscar with George Gibbs, Michael J. McAlister and Dennis Muren.

== Selected filmography ==
- Star Wars (1977)
- The Empire Strikes Back (1980)
- Raiders of the Lost Ark (1981)
- E.T. the Extra-Terrestrial (1982)
- Return of the Jedi (1983)
- Indiana Jones and the Temple of Doom (1984)
- Ghostbusters II (1989)
- Back to the Future Part II (1989)
- Hook (1991)
- Jurassic Park (1993)
- Star Trek Generations (1994)
- The Lost World: Jurassic Park (1997)
- Men in Black (1997)
- Star Wars: Episode I – The Phantom Menace (1999)
- Star Wars: Episode II – Attack of the Clones (2002)
- Star Wars: Episode III – Revenge of the Sith (2005)
- Pirates of the Caribbean: Dead Man's Chest (2006)
- Pirates of the Caribbean: At World's End (2007)
