= John Bell (special effects artist) =

American special effects artist

- Occupation: Special effects artist
- Years active: 1986-present

John Bell is a special effects artist who was nominated at the 62nd Academy Awards in the category of Best Visual effects for his work on the film Back to the Future Part II. His nomination was shared with Steve Gawley, Michael Lantieri and Ken Ralston.

He also works as a concept artist for films.

== Selected filmography ==
- Star Trek IV: The Voyage Home (1986)
- Back to the Future Part II (1989)
- Back to the Future Part III (1990)
- The Rocketeer (1991)
- Jurassic Park (1993)
- The Lost World: Jurassic Park (1997)
- Antz (1998)
- Pirates of the Caribbean: On Stranger Tides (2011)
- Rango (2011)
- G.I. Joe: Retaliation (2013)
