= Joss Williams =

Special effects supervisor

- Died: c. 2020
- Occupation: Visual effects artist
- Years active: 1984–2013

Joss Williams was a special effects supervisor.

On January 24, 2012, he won an Oscar for the film Hugo. He shared his win with Ben Grossmann, Alex Henning and Robert Legato.

During the In Memoriam presentation at the 92nd Academy Awards in 2020, Williams was listed amongst those being paid tribute to, revealing his death.
