= Jim Berney =

American visual effects supervisor

- Occupation: Visual effects supervisor
- Years active: 1995-Present

Jim Berney is a visual effects supervisor who has worked on films such as The Chronicles of Narnia: The Lion, the Witch and the Wardrobe, The Lord of the Rings: The Two Towers and I Am Legend.

He received a nomination for Best Visual Effects at the 78th Academy Awards for his work on The Chronicles of Narnia: The Lion, the Witch and the Wardrobe. He shared his nomination with Scott Farrar, Bill Westenhofer and Dean Wright.

== Selected filmography ==
- Batman Forever (1995)
- Mortal Kombat (1995)
- Under Siege 2: Dark Territory (1995)
- Anaconda (1997)
- Contact (1997)
- Starship Troopers (1997)
- Godzilla (1998)
- Stuart Little (1999)
- Hollow Man (2000)
- Harry Potter and the Sorcerer's Stone (2001)
- The Lord of the Rings: The Two Towers (2002)
- Men in Black II (2002)
- The Matrix Reloaded (2003)
- The Matrix Revolutions (2003)
- The Chronicles of Narnia: The Lion, the Witch and the Wardrobe (2005)
- I Am Legend (2007)
- Eagle Eye (2008)
- Green Lantern (2011)
- Divergent (2014)
- A Minecraft Movie (2025)
