= Nick Allder =

English special effects supervisor and coordinator

- Born: Nicholas John Allder; February 10, 1943 (age 83); Buckinghamshire, England, United Kingdom
- Occupation: Film special effects artist
- Years active: 1968–present
- Spouse: Susan Penning (m. 1980–1999)

Nick Allder is an English special effects supervisor and coordinator. He started his career as an assistant camera operator and moved, after eight years, into special effects. He has won multiple awards, including an Academy Award for Best Visual Effects for the science-fiction horror film Alien (1979), and a BAFTA Award for Best Special Visual Effects for the science-fiction film The Fifth Element (1997). Allder has worked on the set of high-grossing films such as the epic space opera The Empire Strikes Back (1980) and the historical drama film Braveheart (1995).

== Career ==
Allder started his professional career as an assistant camera operator, making advertisements. After eight years, he moved on to special effects.

=== Awards ===
In addition to winning an Academy Award for Alien and a BAFTA Award for The Fifth Element, Allder was nominated for an additional Saturn Award for Best Special Effects for Alien and a BAFTA Award for Best Special Visual Effects for the fantasy film Legend (1985)

=== Filmography ===
Year	Film	Genre
1968	A Twist of Sand	Adventure
1969	Battle of Britain	Action, Drama
1969	Moon Zero Two	Science fiction
1973	Yellow Dog	Action, Drama
1978	The Medusa Touch	Supernatural thriller
1975 – 78	Space: 1999	Science-fiction TV series
1979	Alien	Science-fiction horror
1980	The Empire Strikes Back	Epic space opera
1980	The Sea Wolves	War
1981	Nighthawks	Thriller
1982	Conan the Barbarian	Fantasy, Thriller
1982	The Final Option	Drama
1982	The Sender	Horror, Thriller
1982	Cosmic Princess	Science Fiction
1983	The Return of the Soldier	Drama
1983	The Keep	Horror, Thriller
1984	Top Secret!	Parody, Action
1985	Legend	Fantasy
1985	The Jewel of the Nile	Action, Romance
1986	Solarbabies	Drama, Science Fiction
1987	The Princess Bride	Fantasy, Romance
1988	The Rescue	Drama, Action
1989	Leviathan	Mystery, Science Fiction
1990	A Chinese Ghost Story II	Drama, Fantasy
1991	Shuttlecock	Thriller
1992	City of Joy	Drama
1994	The Professional	Drama, Mystery
1994	MacGyver: Trail to Doomsday	Action, Adventure
1995	Braveheart	Historical drama
1996	Muppet Treasure Island	Comedy, Music
1997	The Fifth Element	Science-fiction
1998	Lost in Space	Action, Adventure
1999	Cleopatra	
1999	The Criminal	
2000	Highlander: Endgame	
2001	The Lost Empire	TV mini-series
2001	Just Visiting	
2001	Behind Enemy Lines	
2002	Blade II	
2003	Shanghai Knights	
2003	Underworld	
2004	Hellboy	
2005	The Cave	
2005	An American Haunting	
2007	Blood and Chocolate	
2007	The Company	TV mini-series
2007	The Seeker: The Dark Is Rising	
2011	Weapon	
2012	Ghost Rider: Spirit of Vengeance	3D superhero
2013	The Zero Theorem	Science Fiction, Drama
