= Steve Gawley =

American special effects artist

- Born: 1952 (age 73–74)
- Occupation: Visual effects artist
- Years active: 1975–2007

Steve Gawley (born 1952) is a visual effects artist who was nominated at the 62nd Academy Awards in the category of Best Visual effects for his work on the film Back to the Future Part II. His nomination was shared with John Bell, Michael Lantieri and Ken Ralston.

Steve Gawley is best known as an original ILM visual FX model shop model maker & model supervisor who produced FX model props for 64+ films such as Star Wars Episodes 1-6, several Star Trek films, Back to the Future trilogy. He built the models and miniature sets for the Disneyland motion simulator ride Star Tours. Gawley also appeared during the ride in the role of ‘Red Leader’

== Selected filmography ==
- Star Wars (1977)
- The Empire Strikes Back (1980)
- Raiders of the Lost Ark (1981)
- Star Trek II: The Wrath of Khan (1982)
- Return of the Jedi (1983)
- Star Trek III: The Search for Spock (1984)
- Back to the Future (1985)
- Cocoon (1985)
- *batteries not included (1987)
- Innerspace (1987)
- Who Framed Roger Rabbit (1988)
- Back to the Future Part II (1989)
- Indiana Jones and the Last Crusade (1989)
- Back to the Future Part III (1990)
- The Hunt for Red October (1990)
- Backdraft (1991)
- The Rocketeer (1991)
- Jurassic Park (1993)
- Star Trek Generations (1994)
- Mars Attacks! (1996)
- Men in Black (1997)
- Star Wars: Episode I – The Phantom Menace (1999)
- Space Cowboys (2000)
- A.I. Artificial Intelligence (2001)
- Pearl Harbor (2001)
- Star Wars: Episode II – Attack of the Clones (2002)
- Pirates of the Caribbean: Dead Man's Chest (2006)
- Pirates of the Caribbean: At World's End (2007)
