= John Evans (special effects) =

- Occupation: Special Effects artist
- Years active: 1974-2005

John Evans is a special effects artist who was nominated at the 52nd Academy Awards in the category of Best Visual Effects. He was nominated for his work on the film Moonraker, which he shared with Derek Meddings and Paul Wilson.

He worked on nearly 40 films, including, 5 James Bond films, Batman and Gladiator.
