= Michael J. McAlister =

Special effects artist

- Born: 1954 (age 71–72)
- Occupation: Special effects artist
- Years active: 1977–2008

Michael J. McAlister (born 1954) is a special effects artist. He has been nominated on at least eleven occasions for special or visual effects awards and has won at least three of such awards: an Oscar, a BAFTA and an Emmy.

== Awards ==
- 1985: won an Academy Award for Best Visual Effects for Indiana Jones and the Temple of Doom (film first released in 1984)
- 1985: won a British Academy Film Award for Indiana Jones and the Temple of Doom (film first released in 1984)
- 1986: won a Primetime Emmy Award for Outstanding Special Visual Effects for Ewoks: The Battle for Endor (TV movie first aired in 1985)

== Book ==
- Michael J. McAlister: The Language of Visual Effects. Lone Eagle Pub. Co., Los Angeles, California, 1992, ISBN 978-0-943-72847-6.
