= Michael Lantieri =

American special effects supervisor

Michael Lantieri (born August 13, 1954) is a special effects supervisor.

Lantieri went to school in Los Angeles, California with actor-director Ron Howard with the ambition to work in films as a director, which he had been interested in from a young age. However, he went to work in the special effects department of Universal Studios, with his first credited work being for Heartbeeps (1981), serving as a remote operator. His first collaboration with Steven Spielberg was with Indiana Jones and the Last Crusade (1989), where he served as a special effects supervisor. His work on Star Trek IV: The Voyage Home (1986) garnered him his first awards nomination (shared with Ken Ralston) by the Saturn Awards. He received his first of five Academy Award nominations with Back to the Future Part II (1989), with his work on Jurassic Park (1993) earning him an Academy Award. Lantieri has subsequently worked on each film of the Jurassic Park franchise, serving as under special dinosaur effects for all except Jurassic Park III, where he was credited as a consultant.

One of his most famous films was Mars Attacks! (1996) where he had the job of creating lifelike animations. Two years later, he directed his first and so far only film in Komodo (1998). In addition, Lantieri also worked on Pirates of the Caribbean: Dead Man's Chest (2006) and the Pirates of the Caribbean ride at Disneyland along with effects for video games. In television, he has worked on The Last Tycoon (2016) and Westworld (2016-18) His work on the show earned him (alongside several others) a nomination and ensuing award win for a Primetime Emmy Award for Outstanding Special Visual Effects in 2017 for the episode "The Bicameral Mind".

Unrelated to effects, Lantieri was also part of the destruction of the Steve Bartman baseball; when Grant DePorter bought the ball in late 2003, he tasked Lantieri to help detonate the ball publicly, which was done on February 26, 2004. The remains of the detonated ball are now at the Chicago Sports Museum.
