= Dennis Muren =

Visual effects pioneer

Dennis Muren, A.S.C.
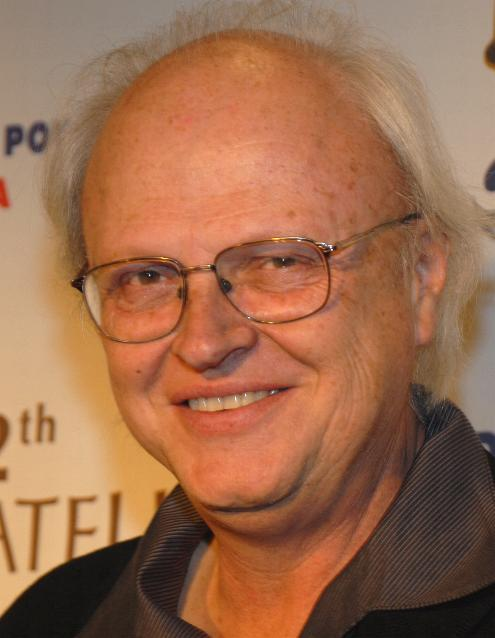
- Muren at the International Press Academy’s 12th Annual Satellite Awards, December 16, 2007
- Born: November 1, 1946 (age 79); Glendale, California, U.S.
- Occupations: Visual effects artist and supervisor

Dennis Muren, A.S.C (born November 1, 1946) is an American film visual effects artist and supervisor. He has worked on the films of George Lucas, Steven Spielberg, and James Cameron, among others, and has won nine Oscars in total: eight for Best Visual Effects and a Technical Achievement Academy Award. The Visual Effects Society has called him "a perpetual student, teacher, innovator, and mentor."

He has been identified as "a pioneer in bringing a new wave of visual effects films to the public, opening the doors for screenwriters and directors to tell stories never before possible with a new realism through the use of his skills in cinematic arts and advanced technologies."

According to Spielberg, Muren "set the example at Industrial Light & Magic for visual effects excellence with effects that add strong, appropriate emotion to a shot and fit seamlessly into a movie."

== Early life ==
Muren was born in 1946 in Glendale, California, the son of Charline Louise (née Clayton) and Elmer Ernest Muren. His interest in photography began at eight years old while shooting model spaceships and dinosaurs. Muren quickly deepened his interest in effects by studying the films of John Fulton, Ray Harryhausen, and Howard Lydecker. He was fascinated by what he observed around him, in appearance and purpose, which led him to study the artwork of John Singer Sargent and Frank Frazetta. He never attended film school but was self-taught, and also learned through friendships with other young Los Angeles effects enthusiasts, including Jim Danforth and David Allen.

In 1965, after graduating from John Muir High School in Pasadena, California, and during a summer vacation at Pasadena City College as a business major, Muren raised $6,500 to make The Equinox, a 71-minute supernatural film incorporating the visual effects techniques he had grown up admiring. He sold it to producer Jack Harris who hired film editor Jack Woods to write and direct additional footage that added a demonic villain and made the film 82 minutes long. When Equinox was released in May 1970, Muren was credited as a producer despite having directed much of the film and created the special effects. Despite its mixed to weak reviews, the movie made enough money for Muren to recoup his investment, and in the years since, it has become a minor cult classic.

== Industrial Light & Magic ==
After earning his associate's degree, Muren struggled for years to find steady work as a visual effects cameraman in Hollywood. In 1976, Muren was hired as 2nd cameraman at Industrial Light & Magic (ILM), then an upstart visual effects studio founded by George Lucas, to work on Star Wars. The film was released in 1977 to wide critical and public acclaim and was for years the highest-grossing film of all time. With a weekend off, he immediately went to work on Spielberg’s Close Encounters of the Third Kind, photographing the Mothership for Douglas Trumbull.

After working a few months on a new television series, Battlestar Galactica, for John Dykstra, Muren moved to Marin County, California, to help build a new ILM. He was hired as effects director of photography with a focus on the techniques and photography of miniatures on Star Wars: The Empire Strikes Back. After that, Muren worked primarily as a Visual Effects Supervisor on all of his films. Former ILM president Jim Morris said Muren "could always find a way to look at a problem from a different angle and come up with a shot or scene that would be wondrous to watch". Over the next seven years, he would win five Oscars.

When Lucas started the Lucasfilm Computer Graphic Group in 1979, Muren hoped to use their technology to make better, original movie images. In a collaboration, he directed the group in the making of the CGI stained glass swordsman for Young Sherlock Holmes, earning an Oscar nomination.

The Graphics Group was sold in 1986, and Lucas started the ILM Computer Graphics Division with Muren helping voice ILM's needs for the digital image to mimic film qualities from lenses to film stocks, with user-friendly tools to mirror what humans see. He has said that his years spent observing and building an understanding of the physical world were invaluable to making virtual realities.

In their first big project, Muren directed the Division in creating shape-shifting animals using in-house custom software for "morphing" (blending) footage of animatronic models in Willow (1988). The Abyss (1989), Terminator 2: Judgment Day (1991), and Jurassic Park (1993) followed. Steven Spielberg had intended to use go-motion for the Jurassic Park dinosaurs, but a CG test of a walking skeleton T-Rex made by ILM's Steve Williams and Mark Dippe (with Marin County as the backdrop) convinced Universal to fund a proof-of-concept, photo-real, no-excuse shot. In three months, following Muren's cinematic goals, the ILM CG department broke new ground, adding organically moving flesh and muscle to the creature's skeleton, covering it with animal-like skin texture and exterior sun and bounce lighting to make a photorealistic walking T-Rex. "It's going to be amazing. People are really going to believe that dinosaurs are walking this earth today," said Steven Spielberg. It was "the shock of the new," earning Muren an Oscar for Best Visual Effects (shared with Stan Winston, Phil Tippett, and Michael Lantieri).

Jurassic Park was the breakthrough that convinced Lucas that technology had advanced enough to make the Star Wars prequels. Director Peter Jackson was similarly inspired by the technical breakthrough in Jurassic Park to begin planning the Lord of the Rings trilogy (2001-2003) and King Kong (2005).

== Personal life ==
Muren is married to British documentary filmmaker and landscape architect Zara Muren, who produced and directed Dream of The Sea Ranch and The Landscape Architecture of Roberto Burle Marx. They have two children and live in California.

In June 1999, Muren was honored with a star on the Hollywood Walk of Fame, the first visual effects artist to be so recognized. He is also a recipient of nine Oscars for Best Visual Effects and a Technical Achievement Academy Award, the most of any living person.

He has a small, non-speaking role in Raiders of the Lost Ark; he appears as a trench-coat-wearing Nazi spy who boards the Pan Am Flying Boat just before Indiana Jones (Harrison Ford) does, sits to the rear of the aircraft and peers over the edge of a magazine at Jones. Due to their similarity in facial appearance (despite great variation in height), this character is often mistaken for Major Toht (Ronald Lacey), the film's primary antagonist, but it has been confirmed that they are not the same. Muren also had a cameo in the theme-park attraction Star Tours.

== Novel builds and innovations ==
- 1980-1983: Used an animation camera stand as a 4-axis optical printer to make dozens of dramatic shots in The Empire Strikes Back and Return of the Jedi. They referred to it as “pin blocking."
- 1983: In three days, Muren pre-visualized more than 100 shots for the Return of the Jedi speeder bike chase by hand-holding the first tiny video camera and taping a Barbie and Ken doll as well as cardboard tubes on a shag carpet.
- 1984: Used a Nikon F3 camera as a go-motion movie camera to photograph much of the Indiana Jones and the Temple of Doom mine car chase, saving construction and shooting time.
- 1985: Directed the Lucasfilm Graphics Group to make the first photo-real CGI character, the "Stained Glass Knight" for Young Sherlock Holmes, and the first theatrical-quality digital film composite.
- 1987: With ILM’s new CGI department, Muren pre-visualized the original Star Tours ride-film for Disneyland in early CGI to work out the story, moves, and timings for a four-minute continuous view out the shuttle’s front window.
- 1988: Directed the first digital 2D morphing effect for George Lucas and Ron Howard's Willow.
- 1990: After The Abyss, Muren took a one-year sabbatical to study CGI software and hardware theory, to which he credits much of the success of the Terminator 2: Judgment Day digital effects.
- 1991: During his sabbatical, he assembled the first robust film scanning, manipulating, recording system for flawless, photo-real 2D and 3D image manipulation. It was used for Terminator 2: Judgment Day, then Death Becomes Her, and Jurassic Park, among other films.
- 1993: Directed the CGI dinosaurs to their photo-real conclusions for Jurassic Park.
- 1992-1995: Directed proof-of-concept CG tests for Death Becomes Her and Twister.
- 2001: Used a real-time, on-set rendering and compositing preview viewing with a 6-axis camera movement for A.I. Artificial Intelligence.
- 2003: Made a live on-set portable previz using the Unreal Tournament game engine on a laptop PC to display the film camera's live view under a live render of Hulk's 12-foot-tall shape, in real time, as a live on-set previz.
- 2012: Supervised unreleased 3D conversions of Attack of the Clones and Revenge of the Sith with exaggerated depths that he called Extreme 3D.

== Affiliations ==
- American Society Of Cinematography
- Academy of Motion Picture Arts and Sciences
- Visual Effects Society

== Engagements ==
- Academy of Motion Pictures Arts & Sciences
- American Film Institute
- American Society of Cinematographers
- Smithsonian Institution
- Supercomputing Conference
- BFI
- Berlin Film Festival
- California Film Institute
- Dallas Film Festival
- UCLA Film Department
- UC Berkeley Film Series
- Liverpool University Film
- MARS 2019
- Mill Valley Film Festival
- New Yorker Conference
- Paris Images Digital Conference
- San Francisco Art Institute
- SIGGRAPH
- ShowBiz Expo
- Yerba Buena Center for the Arts
- USA Film Festival
- USC Film Department
- VIEW Conference - Torino

== Filmography and select awards ==
Academy, BAFTA, Emmy, and VES Awards

| Year | Film | Title | Award | Category | Result |
|---|---|---|---|---|---|
| 2015 | Star Wars: The Force Awakens | Visual Effects Creative Consultant | | | |
| 2012 | Paranormal Activity 4 | Senior Creative Executive | | | |
| 2011 | Super 8 | Visual Effects Supervisor | | | |
| 2008 | Wall-E | Visual Consultant | | | |
| 2005 | War of the Worlds | Visual Effects Supervisor | Oscar | Best Visual Effects | Nominated |
| 2005 | War of the Worlds | Visual Effects Supervisor | VES Award | Best Single Visual Effect of the Year | Won |
| 2003 | Hulk | Visual Effects Supervisor | VES Award | Best Single Visual Effect of the Year | Nominated |
| 2002 | Star Wars: Attack of the Clones | Visual Effects Supervisor | | | |
| 2001 | A.I. Artificial Intelligence | Visual Effects Supervisor | Oscar | Best Visual Effects | Nominated |
| 2001 | A.I. Artificial Intelligence | Visual Effects Supervisor | BAFTA Film Award | Best Special Visual Effects | Nominated |
| 1999 | Star Wars: The Phantom Menace | Visual Effects Supervisor | Oscar | Best Visual Effects | Nominated |
| 1999 | Star Wars: The Phantom Menace | Visual Effects Supervisor | BAFTA Film Award | Best Special Visual Effects | Nominated |
| 1997 | Deconstructing Harry | Creative Advisor | | | |
| 1997 | The Lost World: Jurassic Park | Visual Effects Supervisor | Oscar | Best Visual Effects | Nominated |
| 1997 | Star Wars Trilogy Special Edition | Visual Effects Advisor | | | |
| 1996 | Twister | Visual Effects Creative Advisor | | | |
| 1996 | Mission: Impossible | Visual Effects Creative Advisor | | | |
| 1995 | Casper | Visual Effects Supervisor & Digital Character Supervisor | | | |
| 1993 | Jurassic Park | Full-Motion Dinosaurs | Oscar | Best Visual Effects | Won |
| 1993 | Jurassic Park | Full-Motion Dinosaurs | BAFTA Film Award | Best Special Visual Effects | Won |
| 1991 | Terminator 2: Judgment Day | Visual Effects Supervisor | Oscar | Best Visual Effects | Won |
| 1991 | Terminator 2: Judgment Day | Visual Effects Supervisor | BAFTA Film Award | Best Special Visual Effects | Won |
| 1989 | The Abyss | Visual Effects Supervisor | Oscar | Best Visual Effects | Won |
| 1989 | Ghostbusters II | Visual Effects Supervisor | | | |
| 1988 | Willow | Visual Effects Supervisor | Oscar | Best Visual Effects | Nominated |
| 1987 | Empire of the Sun | Additional Optical Effects | | | |
| 1987 | Innerspace | Visual Effects Supervisor | Oscar | Best Visual Effects | Won |
| 1987 | Star Tours (Ride Film) | Director & Visual Effects Supervisor | | | |
| 1986 | Captain EO | Visual Effects Supervisor | | | |
| 1985 | Young Sherlock Holmes | Visual Effects Supervisor | Oscar | Best Visual Effects | Nominated |
| 1984 | Caravan of Courage: An Ewok Adventure | Special Effects | Primetime Emmy Award | Outstanding Special Visual Effects | Won |
| 1984 | Indiana Jones and the Temple of Doom | Visual Effects Supervisor | Oscar | Best Visual Effects | Won |
| 1984 | Indiana Jones and the Temple of Doom | Visual Effects Supervisor | BAFTA Film Award | Best Special Visual Effects | Won |
| 1983 | Return of the Jedi | Visual Effects Supervisor | Oscar | Best Visual Effects | Won |
| 1983 | Return of the Jedi | Visual Effects Supervisor | BAFTA Film Award | Best Special Visual Effects | Won |
| 1982 | E.T. the Extra-Terrestrial | Visual Effects Supervisor | Oscar | Best Visual Effects | Won |
| 1982 | E.T. the Extra-Terrestrial | Visual Effects Supervisor | BAFTA Film Award | Best Special Visual Effects | Nominated |
| 1981 | Dragonslayer | Visual Effects Supervisor | Oscar | Best Visual Effects | Nominated |
| 1980 | The Empire Strikes Back | Visual Effects Director of Photography | Oscar | Best Visual Effects | Won |
| 1978 | Battlestar Galactica | Visual Effects Photography | | | |
| 1977 | Close Encounters of the Third Kind | Mothership Effects Photography | | | |
| 1977 | Star Wars | Visual Effects 2nd Cameraman | | | |
| 1975 | Cascade of California (Commercials) | Camera Operator / Department Head | | | |
| 1970 | Flight to the Stars | Visual Effects Photography | | | |
| 1970 | The Solar System: Islands in Space | Visual Effects Photography | | | |
| 1969 | Cascade Pictures of California, Filmfare | Freelance Effects Cameraman / Stop Motion Animator | | | |
| 1965 | Equinox | Producer / Director / Director of Photography, Editor | | | |
