= List of accolades received by Titanic =

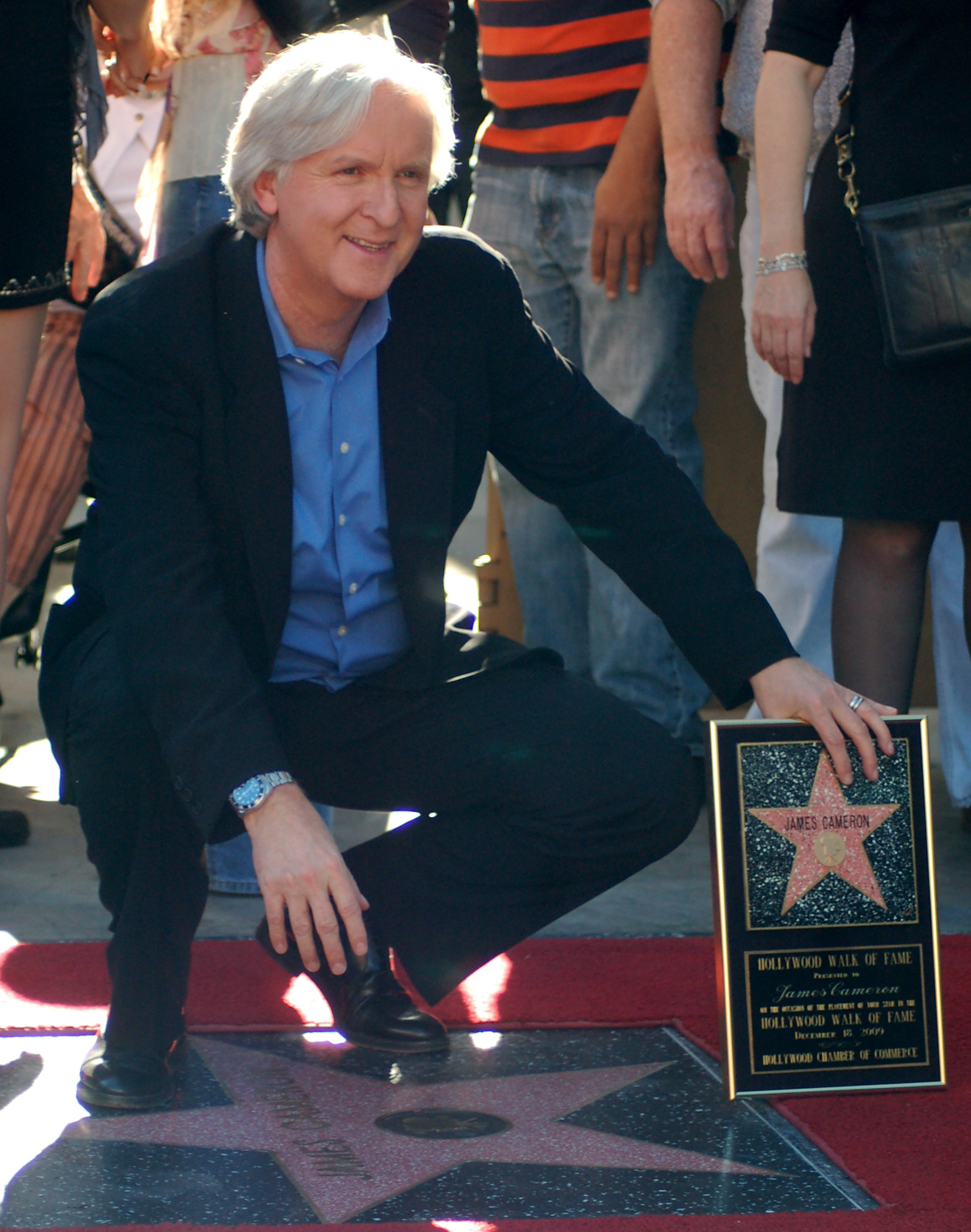
- Writer, producer, and director of Titanic, James Cameron
Awards and nominations
Award	Wins	Nominations
Academy Awards	11	14
Amanda Awards	1	1
American Music Awards	1	1
American Society of Cinematographers	1	1
Annie Awards	1	1
Art Directors Guild	1	1
Artios Awards	0	1
ASCAP Film and Television Music Awards	2	2
Billboard Latin Music Awards	1	1
Billboard Music Awards	3	3
Blockbuster Entertainment Awards	5	6
Blue Ribbon Awards	1	1
BMI Film & TV Awards	1	1
Bogey Awards	1	1
Brit Awards	1	1
British Academy Film Awards	0	10
British Society of Cinematographers	1	1
César Awards	0	1
Chicago Film Critics Association Awards	1	2
Cinema Audio Society	1	1
Critics' Choice Movie Awards	1	2
Czech Lions	1	1
Dallas–Fort Worth Film Critics Association	3	3
Danish Music Awards	0	1
Directors Guild of America Award	1	1
Eddie Awards	1	1
Empire Awards	1	2
European Film Awards	1	2
Florida Film Critics Circle	1	1
Golden Globe Awards	4	8
Golden Reel Awards	3	3
Goldene Kamera	1	1
Goldene Leinwand	6	6
Grammy Awards	4	4
Guinness World Records	10	10
Hochi Film Award	1	1
Hollywood Film Awards	1	1
Japan Academy Film Prize	1	1
Japan Gold Disc Award	2	2
Japan Record Awards	1	1
Juno Award	0	2
Jupiter Award	3	3
Los Angeles Film Critics Association	3	3
Mainichi Film Award	1	1
MuchMusic Video Awards	1	1
MTV Movie Awards	2	8
MTV Video Music Awards	0	2
National Board of Review	2	2
National Film Preservation Board	1	1
New York Film Critics Circle	1	1
Nickelodeon Kids' Choice Awards	1	1
Online Film Critics Society	3	4
People's Choice Awards	2	2
Producers Guild of America Award	1	1
Russian Guild of Film Critics	0	1
Satellite Awards	8	15
Saturn Awards	1	3
Screen Actors Guild Awards	1	3
Toronto Film Critics Association	1	1
Writers Guild of America Awards	0	1

Totals (Note: Certain award groups do not simply award one winner. They acknowledge several different recipients, have runners-up, and have third place. Since this is a specific recognition and is different from losing an award, runner-up mentions are considered wins in this award tally. For simplification and to avoid errors, each award in this list has been presumed to have had a prior nomination.)
- Wins: 111
- Nominations: 162

Titanic is a 1997 American epic romance and disaster film directed, written, co-produced, and co-edited by James Cameron. Incorporating both historical and fictionalized aspects, it is based on accounts of the sinking of the Titanic, and stars Leonardo DiCaprio and Kate Winslet as members of different social classes who fall in love aboard the ship during its ill-fated maiden voyage.

Regarded as one of the greatest films ever made, Titanic grossed a worldwide total of over $2.2 billion on a production budget of $200 million, being the first and second film to reach the mark of one and two billion dollars, respectively. It became the highest-grossing film of all time in 1998, and remained so for twelve years, until Avatar (2009), also written and directed by Cameron, surpassed it in 2010. On review aggregator website Rotten Tomatoes, the film has an approval rating of 87% based on 237 reviews, with an average rating of 8/10. The site's critical consensus reads, "A mostly unqualified triumph for James Cameron, who offers a dizzying blend of spectacular visuals and old-fashioned melodrama." Metacritic, which assigned a weighted average rating of 75 out of 100, reports the film has "generally favorable reviews" based on the reviews of 35 critics. Audiences polled by CinemaScore gave the film an average grade of "A+" on an A+ to F scale. In 2017, on its 20th anniversary, the film was selected for preservation in the United States National Film Registry by the Library of Congress as being "culturally, historically, or aesthetically significant".

At the 55th Golden Globe Awards, Titanic won in the categories of Best Motion Picture – Drama, Best Director, Best Original Score, and Best Original Song. Winslet and Gloria Stuart were also nominated for their acting performances. At the 70th Academy Awards, the film garnered fourteen nominations, tying the record set in 1950 by Joseph L. Mankiewicz's All About Eve, with eleven wins: Best Picture (the second film about the Titanic to win that award, after 1933's Cavalcade), Best Director, Best Art Direction, Best Cinematography, Best Visual Effects, Best Film Editing, Best Costume Design, Best Sound, Best Sound Editing, Best Original Dramatic Score, and Best Original Song. Winslet, Stuart and the make-up artists were the three nominees that have no win. It was the second film to win eleven Academy Awards, after Ben-Hur (1959). It was also nominated for ten British Academy Film Awards, including Best Film and Best Director; it failed to win any. The film garnered a leading twelve nominations at the 2nd Golden Satellite Awards and more three in the 2005 edition, winning a total of eight awards, while Stuart won the Saturn Award for Best Supporting Actress. Other recognitions came from numerous North American guilds, such as the American Society of Cinematographers, Art Directors Guild, Directors Guild of America, National Board of Review, Producers Guild of America, and the Screen Actors Guild.

After winning the Golden Globe and the Oscar for Best Original Song, "My Heart Will Go On" won all the awards that was nominated at the 41st Annual Grammy Awards, including Record of the Year, Song of the Year, and Best Song Written for a Motion Picture or for Television. Its soundtrack won the American Music Award for Favorite Soundtrack, the Brit Award for Soundtrack/Cast Recording, and the Billboard Music Award for Album of the Year and Soundtrack Album of the Year. They both also received nominations at the Juno Award. In addition to the awards, Titanic also earned ten Guinness World Records, including Most Expensive Film Produced and Highest Box Office Film Gross for a Drama.

== Accolades ==
Accolades received by Titanic
Award	Date of ceremony	Category	Recipient(s)	Result	Ref.
Academy Awards	March 23, 1998	Best Picture	James Cameron and Jon Landau	Won	
Academy Awards	March 23, 1998	Best Director	James Cameron	Won	
Academy Awards	March 23, 1998	Best Actress	Kate Winslet	Nominated	
Academy Awards	March 23, 1998	Best Supporting Actress	Gloria Stuart	Nominated	
Academy Awards	March 23, 1998	Best Art Direction	Peter Lamont and Michael D. Ford	Won	
Academy Awards	March 23, 1998	Best Cinematography	Russell Carpenter	Won	
Academy Awards	March 23, 1998	Best Costume Design	Deborah Lynn Scott	Won	
Academy Awards	March 23, 1998	Best Film Editing	Conrad Buff, James Cameron, and Richard A. Harris	Won	
Academy Awards	March 23, 1998	Best Makeup	Tina Earnshaw, Greg Cannom, and Simon Thompson	Nominated	
Academy Awards	March 23, 1998	Best Original Dramatic Score	James Horner	Won	
Academy Awards	March 23, 1998	Best Original Song	James Horner and Will Jennings for "My Heart Will Go On"	Won	
Academy Awards	March 23, 1998	Best Sound	Gary Rydstrom, Tom Johnson, Gary Summers, and Mark Ulano	Won	
Academy Awards	March 23, 1998	Best Sound Effects Editing	Christopher Boyes and Tom Bellfort	Won	
Academy Awards	March 23, 1998	Best Visual Effects	Robert Legato, Mark A. Lasoff, Thomas L. Fisher, and Michael Kanfer	Won	
Amanda Award	August 29, 1998	Best Foreign Feature Film	James Cameron	Won	
American Music Awards	January 11, 1999	Favorite Soundtrack	Titanic (Soundtrack)	Won	
American Society of Cinematographers	March 8, 1998	Outstanding Achievement in Cinematography in Theatrical Releases	Russell Carpenter	Won	
Annie Awards	November 13, 1998	Technical Achievement	Titanic	Won	
Art Directors Guild Awards	February 28, 1998	Best Production Design – Feature Film	Peter Lamont, Charles Dwight Lee, Martin Laing, Neil Lamont, Robert W. Laing, Bill Rea, Steven Lawrence, and Héctor Romero	Won	
Artios Awards	November 4, 1998	Best Casting for Feature Film – Drama	Mali Finn	Nominated	
ASCAP Film and Television Music Awards	April 28, 1998	Top Box Office Films	James Horner for Titanic	Won	
ASCAP Film and Television Music Awards	April 27, 1999	Most Performed Songs from Motion Pictures	James Horner and Will Jennings for "My Heart Will Go On"	Won	
Billboard Latin Music Awards	May 9, 2002	First English-Language Song to Top Hot Latin Tracks	"My Heart Will Go On"	Won	
Billboard Music Awards	December 7, 1998	Album of the Year	Titanic	Won	
Billboard Music Awards	December 7, 1998	Soundtrack Album of the Year	Titanic	Won	
Billboard Music Awards	December 7, 1998	Soundtrack Single of the Year	"My Heart Will Go On"	Won	
Blockbuster Entertainment Awards	March 10, 1998	Favorite Actor – Drama	Leonardo DiCaprio	Won	
Blockbuster Entertainment Awards	March 10, 1998	Favorite Actress – Drama	Kate Winslet	Won	
Blockbuster Entertainment Awards	March 10, 1998	Favorite Supporting Actor – Drama	Billy Zane	Won	
Blockbuster Entertainment Awards	March 10, 1998	Favorite Supporting Actress – Drama	Kathy Bates	Won	
Blockbuster Entertainment Awards	May 26, 1999	Favorite Soundtrack	James Horner	Nominated	
Blockbuster Entertainment Awards	May 26, 1999	Favorite Song from a Movie	"My Heart Will Go On"	Won	
Blue Ribbon Awards	February 12, 1998	Best Foreign Language Film	James Cameron	Won	
BMI Film & TV Awards	May 13, 1998	Most Performed Song from a Film	"My Heart Will Go On"	Won	
Bogey Awards	March 23, 1998	Titanium	Titanic	Won	
Brit Awards	February 16, 1999	Soundtrack/Cast Recording	Titanic	Won	
British Academy Film Awards	April 18, 1998	Best Film	James Cameron and Jon Landau	Nominated	
British Academy Film Awards	April 18, 1998	Best Director	James Cameron	Nominated	
British Academy Film Awards	April 18, 1998	Best Cinematography	Russell Carpenter	Nominated	
British Academy Film Awards	April 18, 1998	Best Costume Design	Deborah Lynn Scott	Nominated	
British Academy Film Awards	April 18, 1998	Best Editing	Conrad Buff, James Cameron, and Richard A. Harris	Nominated	
British Academy Film Awards	April 18, 1998	Best Makeup and Hair	Tina Earnshaw, Simon Thompson, and Kay Georgiou	Nominated	
British Academy Film Awards	April 18, 1998	Best Music	James Horner	Nominated	
British Academy Film Awards	April 18, 1998	Best Production Design	Peter Lamont	Nominated	
British Academy Film Awards	April 18, 1998	Best Sound	Gary Rydstrom, Tom Johnson, Gary Summers, and Mark Ulano	Nominated	
British Academy Film Awards	April 18, 1998	Best Special Effects	Robert Legato, Mark A. Lasoff, Thomas L. Fisher, and Michael Kanfer	Nominated	
British Society of Cinematographers	November 29, 1997	Best Cinematography	Russell Carpenter	Nominated	
César Awards	March 6, 1999	Best Foreign Film	James Cameron	Nominated	
Chicago Film Critics Association	March 1, 1998	Best Film	Titanic	Nominated	
Chicago Film Critics Association	March 1, 1998	Best Director	James Cameron	Nominated	
Chicago Film Critics Association	March 1, 1998	Best Cinematography	Russell Carpenter	Won	
Chicago Film Critics Association	March 1, 1998	Best Original Score	James Horner	Won	
Cinema Audio Society Awards	March 7, 1998	Outstanding Achievement in Sound Mixing for a Feature Film	Gary Rydstrom, Tom Johnson, Gary Summers, and Mark Ulano	Won	
Critics' Choice Movie Awards	January 20, 1998	Best Picture	Titanic	Nominated	
Critics' Choice Movie Awards	January 20, 1998	Best Director	James Cameron	Won	
Czech Lion Awards	February 27, 1999	Box Office Award	Titanic	Won	
Dallas–Fort Worth Film Critics Association	January 1998	Best Film	Titanic	2nd place	
Dallas–Fort Worth Film Critics Association	January 1998	Best Director	James Cameron	Won	
Dallas–Fort Worth Film Critics Association	January 1998	Best Cinematography	Russell Carpenter	Won	
Danish Music Awards	February 6, 1999	Best International Hit	"My Heart Will Go On"	Nominated	
Directors Guild of America Award	March 7, 1998	Outstanding Directing – Feature Film	James Cameron	Won	
Eddie Awards	March 14, 1998	Best Edited Feature Film	Conrad Buff, James Cameron, and Richard A. Harris	Won	
Empire Awards	February 25, 1999	Best Film	Titanic	Won	
Empire Awards	February 25, 1999	Best British Actress	Kate Winslet	Won	
European Film Awards	December 7, 1998	Achievement in World Cinema Award	Kate Winslet	Nominated	
European Film Awards	December 7, 1998	People's Choice Award for Best Actress	Kate Winslet	Won	
Florida Film Critics Circle	January 1998	Best Film	Titanic	Won	
Golden Globe Awards	January 18, 1998	Best Motion Picture – Drama	Titanic	Won	
Golden Globe Awards	January 18, 1998	Best Director	James Cameron	Won	
Golden Globe Awards	January 18, 1998	Best Actor in a Motion Picture – Drama	Leonardo DiCaprio	Nominated	
Golden Globe Awards	January 18, 1998	Best Actress in a Motion Picture – Drama	Kate Winslet	Nominated	
Golden Globe Awards	January 18, 1998	Best Supporting Actress in a Motion Picture	Gloria Stuart	Nominated	
Golden Globe Awards	January 18, 1998	Best Screenplay	James Cameron	Nominated	
Golden Globe Awards	January 18, 1998	Best Original Score	James Horner	Won	
Golden Globe Awards	January 18, 1998	Best Original Song	James Horner and Will Jennings for "My Heart Will Go On"	Won	
Golden Reel Awards	March 21, 1998	Best Sound Editing – Music in a Feature Film	Jim Henrikson and Joe E. Rand	Won	
Golden Reel Awards	March 21, 1998	Best Sound Editing – Dialogue and ADR in a Feature Film	Gwendolyn Yates Whittle, Hugh Waddell, Claire Sanfilippo, John H. Arrufat, Richard Quinn, Sue Fox, Harriet Fidlow, Richard Corwin, Cindy Marty, and Lee Lemont	Won	
Golden Reel Awards	March 21, 1998	Best Sound Editing – Sound Effects and Foley in a Feature Film	Tom Bellfort, Christopher Boyes, Thomas W. Small, Ethan Van der Ryn, Scott Guitteau, Christopher Scarabosio, Shannon Mills, Scott Curtis, Tammy Fearing, Michael Dressel, and David L. Horton Jr.	Won	
Goldene Kamera	February 6, 2001	Best International Actress	Kate Winslet	Won	
Goldene Leinwand	January 25, 1998	Golden Screen	Titanic	Won	
Goldene Leinwand	February 6, 1998	Golden Screen with One Star	Titanic	Won	
Goldene Leinwand	February 23, 1998	Golden Screen with Two Stars	Titanic	Won	
Goldene Leinwand	March 15, 1998	Golden Screen with Three Stars	Titanic	Won	
Goldene Leinwand	April 12, 1998	Special Award for 15 Million Visitors	Titanic	Won	
Goldene Leinwand	January 3, 1999	Special Award for 18 Million Visitors	Titanic	Won	
Grammy Awards	February 24, 1999	Record of the Year	Celine Dion, Walter Afanasieff, Simon Franglen, James Horner, Humberto Gatica, and David Gleeson for "My Heart Will Go On"	Won	
Grammy Awards	February 24, 1999	Song of the Year	James Horner and Will Jennings for "My Heart Will Go On"	Won	
Grammy Awards	February 24, 1999	Best Song Written for a Motion Picture or for Television	James Horner and Will Jennings for "My Heart Will Go On"	Won	
Grammy Awards	February 24, 1999	Best Female Pop Vocal Performance	Celine Dion for "My Heart Will Go On"	Won	
Guinness World Records	1997	Largest Budget for Film Stunts	Titanic	Won	
Guinness World Records	1997	Most Expensive Film Produced	Titanic	Won	
Guinness World Records	1997	Largest Camera Crane Used on Film	Titanic	Won	
Guinness World Records	1998	Most Oscar Nominations Received by a Film	Titanic	Won (Note: Tied with All About Eve (1950) and La La Land (2016))	
Guinness World Records	1998	Most Oscars Won by a Film	Titanic	Won (Note: Tied with Ben-Hur (1959) and The Lord of the Rings: The Return of the King (2003))	
Guinness World Records	1998	Longest Cinematic Release	Titanic	Won	
Guinness World Records	1998	Most Consecutive Weekends for a Movie to Be No. 1	Titanic	Won	
Guinness World Records	1998	First Movie to Gross $1 Billion	Titanic	Won	
Guinness World Records	1998	Highest Grossing Historical Epic of All Time	Titanic	Won	
Guinness World Records	1998	Highest Box Office Film Gross for a Drama	Titanic	Won	
Hochi Film Award	December 25, 1998	Best Foreign Language Film	James Cameron	Won	
Hollywood Film Awards	August 5, 1998	Hollywood Digital Award	Robert Legato and Crystal Dowd	Won	
Japan Academy Film Prize	March 6, 1998	Outstanding Foreign Language Film	Titanic	Won	
Japan Gold Disc Award	March 6, 1998	International Song of the Year	"My Heart Will Go On"	Won	
Japan Gold Disc Award	March 6, 1998	International Soundtrack Album of the Year	Titanic Original Soundtrack	Won	
Japan Record Awards	December 31, 1998	Special Achievement	Celine Dion for "My Heart Will Go On"	Won	
Juno Award	March 7, 1999	Best Single	"My Heart Will Go On"	Nominated	
Juno Award	March 7, 1999	Best Selling Album (Foreign or Domestic)	Titanic: Music from the Motion Picture	Nominated	
Jupiter Award	March 1998	Best International Film	James Cameron	Won	
Jupiter Award	March 1998	Best International Director	James Cameron	Won	
Jupiter Award	March 1998	Best International Actress	Kate Winslet	Won	
Los Angeles Film Critics Association	December 1997	Best Supporting Actress	Gloria Stuart	2nd place	
Los Angeles Film Critics Association	December 1997	Best Music	James Horner	2nd place	
Los Angeles Film Critics Association	December 1997	Best Production Design	Peter Lamont	Won	
Mainichi Film Awards	February 8, 1999	Readers' Choice Best Foreign Language Film	Titanic	Won	
MuchMusic Video Awards	September 24, 1998	Peoples Choice: Favourite Artist	Celine Dion for "My Heart Will Go On"	Won	
MTV Movie Awards	May 30, 1998	Best Movie	Titanic	Won	
MTV Movie Awards	May 30, 1998	Best Male Performance	Leonardo DiCaprio	Won	
MTV Movie Awards	May 30, 1998	Best Female Performance	Kate Winslet	Nominated	
MTV Movie Awards	May 30, 1998	Best Villain	Billy Zane	Nominated	
MTV Movie Awards	May 30, 1998	Best On-Screen Duo	Leonardo DiCaprio and Kate Winslet	Nominated	
MTV Movie Awards	May 30, 1998	Best Kiss	Leonardo DiCaprio and Kate Winslet	Nominated	
MTV Movie Awards	May 30, 1998	Best Action Sequence	Ship sinks	Nominated	
MTV Movie Awards	May 30, 1998	Best Song from a Movie	"My Heart Will Go On"	Nominated	
MTV Video Music Awards	September 10, 1998	Best Video from a Film	"My Heart Will Go On"	Nominated	
MTV Video Music Awards	September 10, 1998	Viewer's Choice	"My Heart Will Go On"	Nominated	
National Board of Review	December 8, 1998	Top Ten Films	Titanic	Won	
National Board of Review	December 8, 1998	Special Citation	James Cameron	Won	
National Film Preservation Board	December 13, 2017	Selection for the National Film Registry	Titanic	Selected	
New York Film Critics Circle	January 4, 1998	Best Film	Titanic	3rd place	
Nickelodeon Kids' Choice Awards	April 4, 1998	Favorite Movie	Titanic	Won	
Online Film Critics Society	January 11, 1998	Best Picture	Titanic	Nominated	
Online Film Critics Society	January 11, 1998	Best Director	James Cameron	Won	
Online Film Critics Society	January 11, 1998	Best Actress	Kate Winslet	Nominated	
Online Film Critics Society	January 11, 1998	Best Supporting Actress	Gloria Stuart	Won	
People's Choice Awards	January 13, 1999	Favorite Motion Picture	Titanic	Won	
People's Choice Awards	January 13, 1999	Favorite Dramatic Motion Picture	Titanic	Won	
Producers Guild of America Award	March 3, 1998	Best Theatrical Motion Picture	James Cameron and Jon Landau	Won	
Russian Guild of Film Critics	December 1998	Best Foreign Language Film	James Cameron	Nominated	
Satellite Awards	February 22, 1998	Best Motion Picture – Drama	Titanic	Won	
Satellite Awards	February 22, 1998	Best Director	James Cameron	Won	
Satellite Awards	February 22, 1998	Best Actor in a Motion Picture – Drama	Leonardo DiCaprio	Nominated	
Satellite Awards	February 22, 1998	Best Actress in a Motion Picture – Drama	Kate Winslet	Nominated	
Satellite Awards	February 22, 1998	Best Original Screenplay	James Cameron	Nominated	
Satellite Awards	February 22, 1998	Best Art Direction	Peter Lamont	Won	
Satellite Awards	February 22, 1998	Best Cinematography	Russell Carpenter	Nominated	
Satellite Awards	February 22, 1998	Best Costume Design	Deborah Lynn Scott	Won	
Satellite Awards	February 22, 1998	Best Editing	Conrad Buff and Richard A. Harris	Won	
Satellite Awards	February 22, 1998	Best Original Score	James Horner	Won	
Satellite Awards	February 22, 1998	Best Original Song	James Horner and Will Jennings for "My Heart Will Go On"	Won	
Satellite Awards	February 22, 1998	Best Visual Effects	Robert Legato	Nominated	
Satellite Awards	December 17, 2005	Outstanding Overall DVD	Titanic	Nominated	
Satellite Awards	December 17, 2005	Outstanding Classic DVD	Titanic	Nominated	
Satellite Awards	December 17, 2005	Outstanding DVD Extras	Titanic	Won	
Saturn Awards	June 10, 1998	Best Action/Adventure/Thriller Film	Titanic	Nominated	
Saturn Awards	June 10, 1998	Best Supporting Actress	Gloria Stuart	Won	
Saturn Awards	May 2, 2006	Best Classic Film DVD Release	Titanic	Nominated	
Screen Actors Guild Awards	March 8, 1998	Outstanding Performance by a Female Actor in a Leading Role	Kate Winslet	Nominated	
Screen Actors Guild Awards	March 8, 1998	Outstanding Performance by a Female Actor in a Supporting Role	Gloria Stuart	Won	
Screen Actors Guild Awards	March 8, 1998	Outstanding Performance by a Cast in a Motion Picture	Suzy Amis, Kathy Bates, Leonardo DiCaprio, Frances Fisher, Bernard Fox, Victor Garber, Bernard Hill, Jonathan Hyde, Danny Nucci, Bill Paxton, Gloria Stuart, David Warner, Kate Winslet, and Billy Zane	Nominated	
Toronto Film Critics Association	January 13, 1998	Best Director	James Cameron	Runner-up	
Writers Guild of America Awards	February 21, 1998	Best Original Screenplay	James Cameron	Nominated	

== See also ==
- 1997 in film
- 1997 in music
