= 51st British Academy Film Awards =

1998 film awards ceremony

- Date: 19 April 1998
- Site: Grosvenor House Hotel
- Hosted by: Rory Bremner

Highlights
- Best Film: The Full Monty
- Best British Film: Nil by Mouth
- Best Actor: Robert Carlyle; The Full Monty
- Best Actress: Judi Dench; Mrs Brown
- Most awards: Romeo + Juliet (4)
- Most nominations: L.A. Confidential (12)

The 51st British Academy Film Awards, more commonly known as the BAFTAs, took place on 19 April 1998 at the Grosvenor House Hotel in London, honouring the best national and foreign films of 1997. Presented by the British Academy of Film and Television Arts, accolades were handed out for the best feature-length film and documentaries of any nationality that were screened at British cinemas in 1997.

Peter Cattaneo's The Full Monty won the award for Best Film, while Nil by Mouth, from writer/director Gary Oldman, was voted Outstanding British Film.

The nominations were announced on 9 March 1998. The ceremony was hosted by Rory Bremner.

== Winners and nominees ==
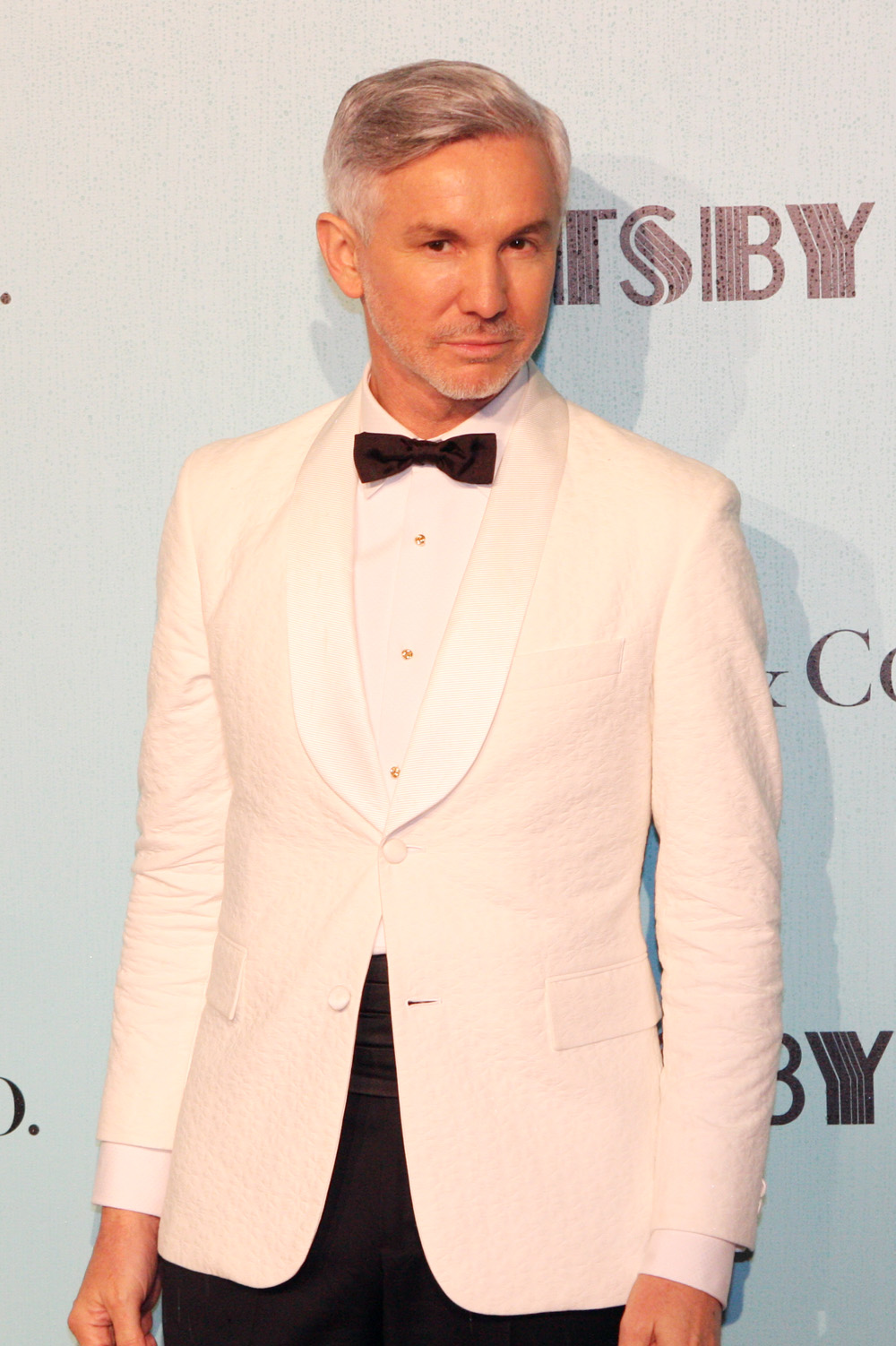
Baz Luhrmann, Best Director winner and Best Adapted Screenplay co-winner

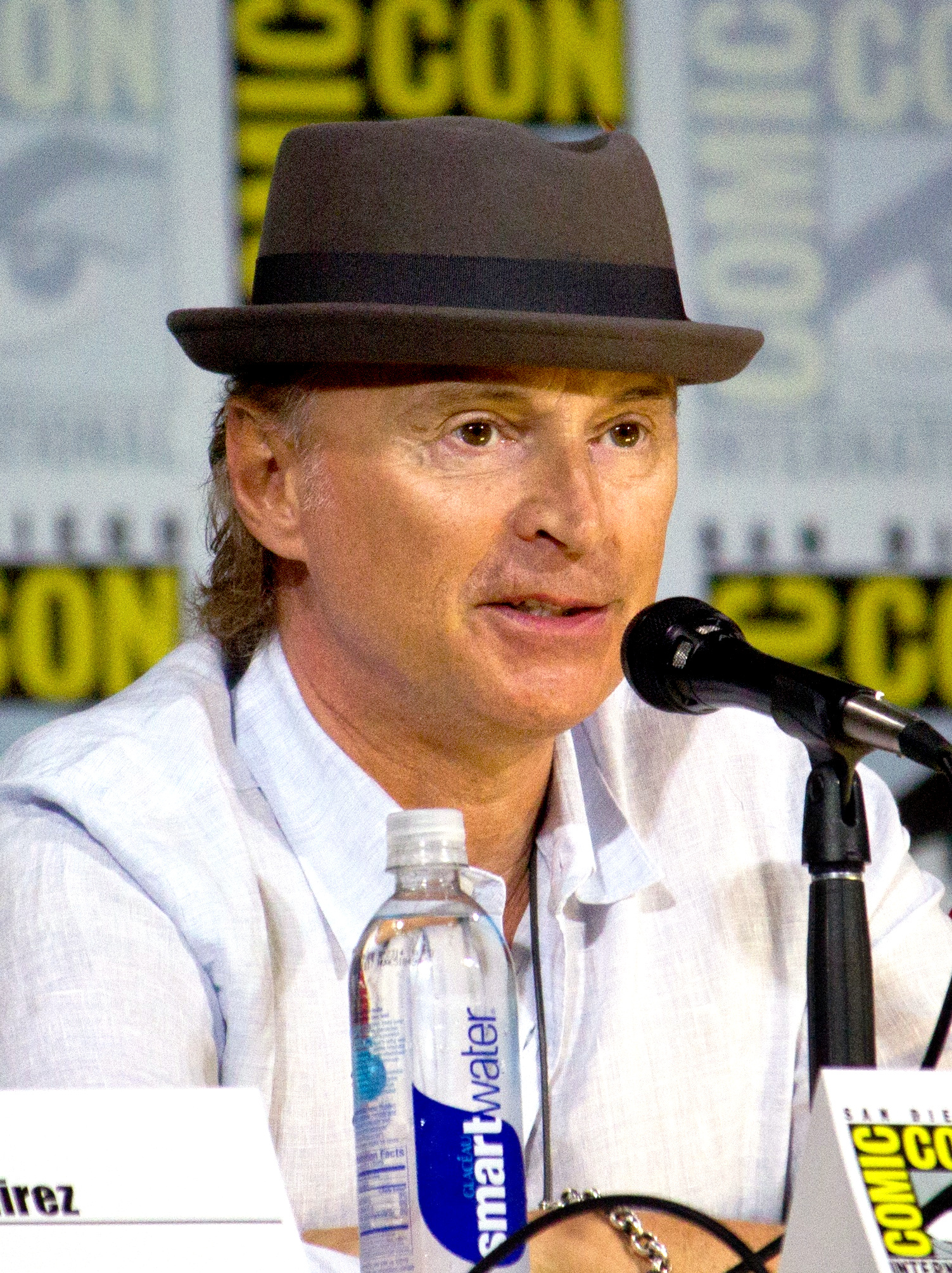
Robert Carlyle, Best Actor winner

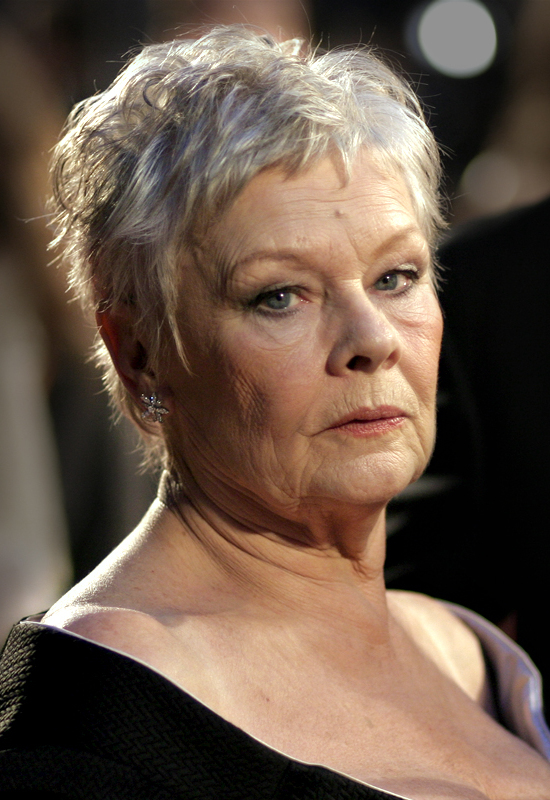
Judi Dench, Best Actress winner

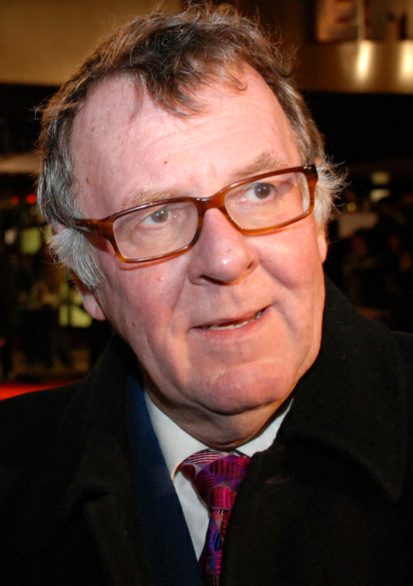
Tom Wilkinson, Best Supporting Actor winner

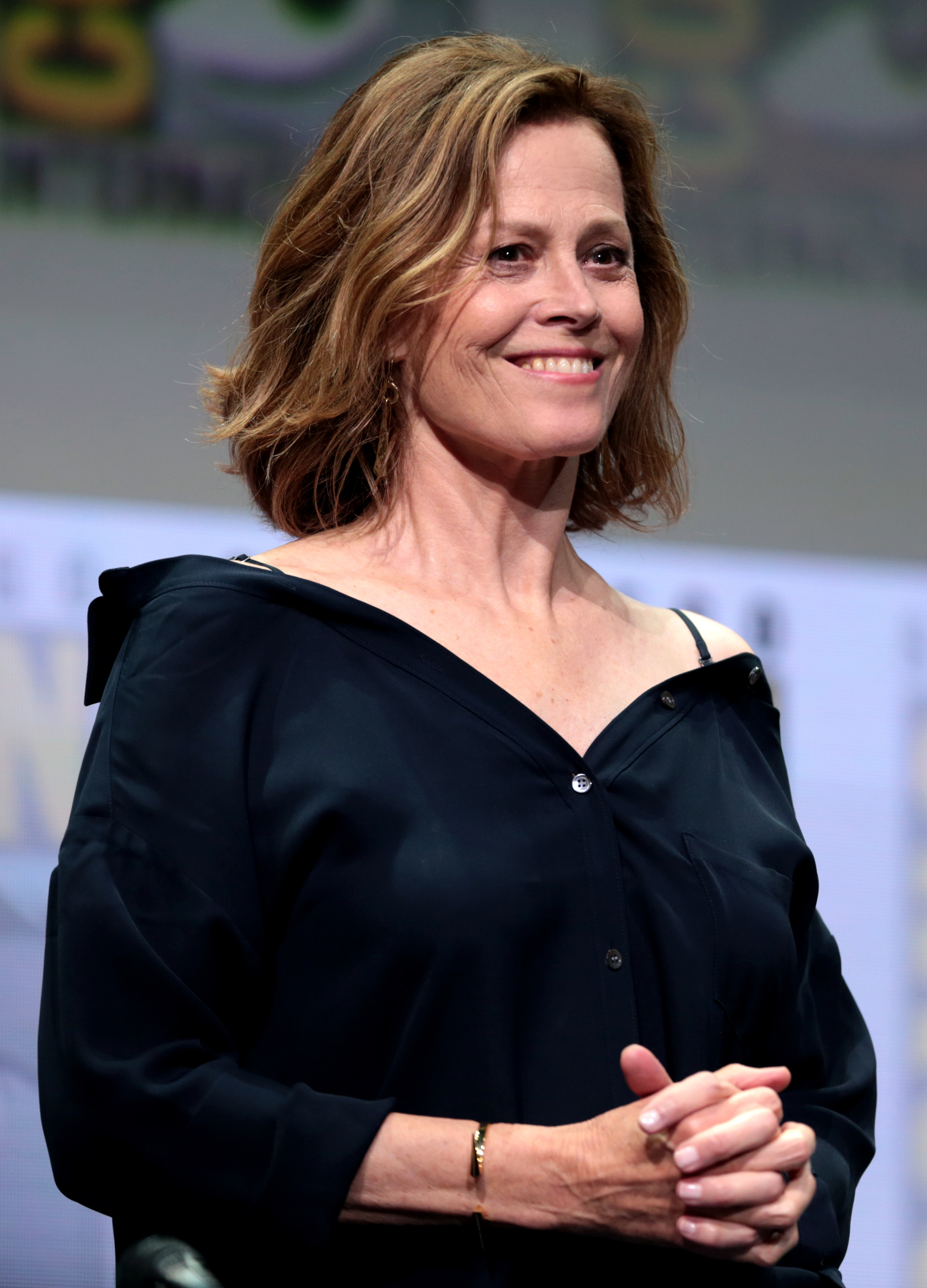
Sigourney Weaver, Best Supporting Actress winner

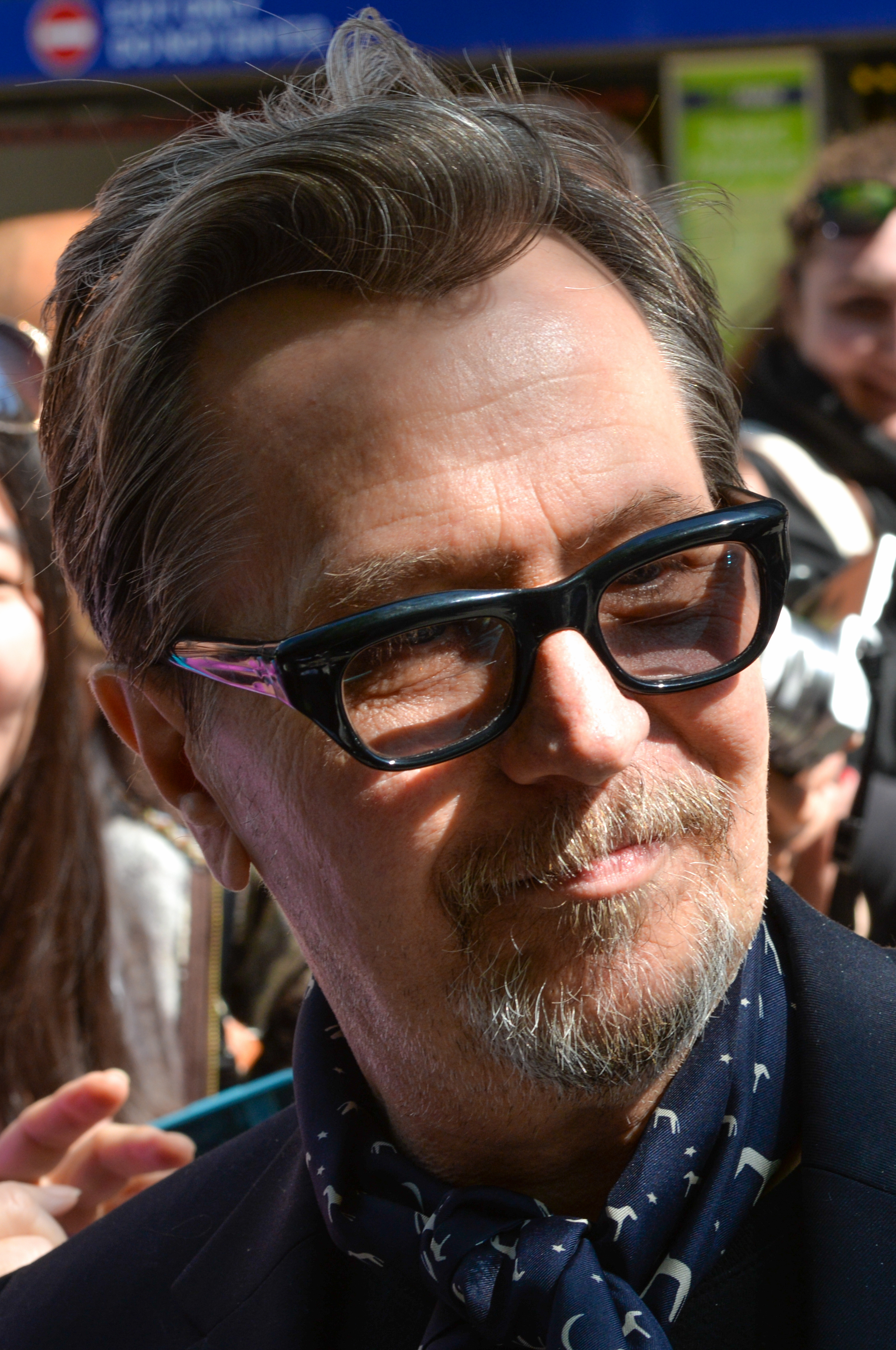
Gary Oldman, Best Original Screenplay winner and Outstanding British Film co-winner

=== BAFTA Fellowship ===
- **Sean Connery**

=== Outstanding British Contribution to Cinema ===
- **Michael Roberts**

=== Awards ===
Winners are listed first and highlighted in boldface.

**Best Film**: **The Full Monty – Uberto Pasolini**; L.A. Confidential – Arnon Milchan, Curtis Hanson and Michael Nathanson; Mrs Brown – Sarah Curtis; Titanic – James Cameron and Jon Landau	**Best Direction**: **Baz Luhrmann – Romeo + Juliet**; James Cameron – Titanic; Peter Cattaneo – The Full Monty; Curtis Hanson – L.A. Confidential
**Best Actor in a Leading Role**: **Robert Carlyle – The Full Monty as Gary Schofield**; Billy Connolly – Mrs Brown as John Brown; Kevin Spacey – L.A. Confidential as Jack Vincennes; Ray Winstone – Nil by Mouth as Raymond	**Best Actress in a Leading Role**: **Judi Dench – Mrs Brown as Queen Victoria**; Kim Basinger – L.A. Confidential as Lynn Bracken; Helena Bonham Carter – The Wings of the Dove as Kate Croy; Kathy Burke – Nil by Mouth as Valerie
**Best Actor in a Supporting Role**: **Tom Wilkinson – The Full Monty as Gerald Cooper**; Mark Addy – The Full Monty as Dave Horsefall; Rupert Everett – My Best Friend's Wedding as George Downes; Burt Reynolds – Boogie Nights as Jack Horner	**Best Actress in a Supporting Role**: **Sigourney Weaver – The Ice Storm as Janey Carver**; Jennifer Ehle – Wilde as Constance Wilde; Lesley Sharp – The Full Monty as Jean Horsefall; Zoë Wanamaker – Wilde as Ada Leverson ('Sphinx')
**Best Original Screenplay**: **Nil by Mouth – Gary Oldman**; Boogie Nights – Paul Thomas Anderson; The Full Monty – Simon Beaufoy; Mrs Brown – Jeremy Brock	**Best Adapted Screenplay**: **Romeo + Juliet – Craig Pearce and Baz Luhrmann**; The Ice Storm – James Schamus; L.A. Confidential – Brian Helgeland and Curtis Hanson; The Wings of the Dove – Hossein Amini
**Best Cinematography**: **The Wings of the Dove – Eduardo Serra**; L.A. Confidential – Dante Spinotti; Romeo + Juliet – Donald McAlpine; Titanic – Russell Carpenter	**Best Costume Design**: **Mrs Brown – Deirdre Clancy**; L.A. Confidential – Ruth Myers; Titanic – Deborah Lynn Scott; The Wings of the Dove – Sandy Powell
**Best Editing**: **L.A. Confidential – Peter Honess**; The Full Monty – David Freeman and Nick Moore; Romeo + Juliet – Jill Bilcock; Titanic – Conrad Buff IV, James Cameron and Richard A. Harris	**Best Makeup and Hair**: **The Wings of the Dove – Sallie Jaye and Jan Archibald**; L.A. Confidential – John M. Elliott Jr., Scott H. Eddo and Janis Clark; Mrs Brown – Lisa Westcott; Titanic – Tina Earnshaw, Simon Thompson, Kay Georgiou and Greg Cannom
**Best Original Music**: **Romeo + Juliet – Nellee Hooper, Craig Armstrong and Marius de Vries**; The Full Monty – Anne Dudley; L.A. Confidential – Jerry Goldsmith; Titanic – James Horner	**Best Production Design**: **Romeo + Juliet – Catherine Martin**; L.A. Confidential – Jeannine Oppewall; Mrs Brown – Martin Childs; Titanic – Peter Lamont
**Best Sound**: **L.A. Confidential – Terry Rodman, Roland Thai, Kirk Francis, Andy Nelson, Anna Behlmer and John Leveque**; The Full Monty – Alastair Crocker, Adrian Rhodes and Ian Wilson; Romeo + Juliet – Gareth Vanderhope, Rob Young and Roger Savage; Titanic – Gary Rydstrom, Tom Johnson, Gary Summers and Mark Ulano	**Best Special Visual Effects**: **The Fifth Element – Mark Stetson, Karen Goulekas, Nick Allder, Neil Corbould and Nick Dudman**; The Borrowers – Peter Chiang; Men in Black – Eric Brevig, Rick Baker, Rob Coleman and Peter Chesney; Titanic – Robert Legato, Mark Lasoff, Thomas L. Fisher and Michael Kanfer
**Outstanding British Film**: **Nil by Mouth – Luc Besson, Douglas Urbanski and Gary Oldman**; The Borrowers – Tim Bevan, Eric Fellner, Rachel Talalay and Peter Hewitt; The Full Monty – Uberto Pasolini and Peter Cattaneo; Mrs Brown – Sarah Curtis and John Madden; Regeneration – Allan Scott, Peter Simpson and Gillies MacKinnon; Twenty Four Seven – Imogen West and Shane Meadows	**Best Film Not in the English Language**: **The Apartment – Georges Benayoun and Gilles Mimouni**; Lucie Aubrac – Claude Berri; Ma vie en rose – Carole Scotta and Alain Berliner; The Tango Lesson – Christopher Sheppard and Sally Potter
**Best Short Animation**: **Stage Fright – Helen Nabarro, Michael Rose and Steve Box**; Flatworld – Nigel Pay, Daniel Greaves and Patrick Veale; Transit – Iain Harvey and Piet Kroon; The Traveller – Jeremy Moorshead and Debra Smith	**Best Short Film**: **The Deadness of Dad – Mandy Sprague, Philippa Cousins and Stephen Volk**; Crocodile Snap – James Greville and Joe Wright; Gasman – Gavin Emerson and Lynne Ramsay; Little Sisters – Nic Murison and Andy Goddard

== Statistics ==
Films that received multiple nominations
Nominations	Film
12	L.A. Confidential
11	The Full Monty
10	Titanic
8	Mrs Brown
7	Romeo + Juliet
5	The Wings of the Dove
4	Nil by Mouth
2	Boogie Nights
2	The Borrowers
2	The Ice Storm
2	Wilde

Films that received multiple awards
Awards	Film
4	Romeo + Juliet
3	The Full Monty
2	L.A. Confidential
2	Mrs Brown
2	Nil by Mouth
2	The Wings of the Dove

== See also ==
- 70th Academy Awards
- 23rd César Awards
- 3rd Critics' Choice Awards
- 50th Directors Guild of America Awards
- 11th European Film Awards
- 55th Golden Globe Awards
- 9th Golden Laurel Awards
- 18th Golden Raspberry Awards
- 2nd Golden Satellite Awards
- 12th Goya Awards
- 13th Independent Spirit Awards
- 3rd Lumière Awards
- 24th Saturn Awards
- 4th Screen Actors Guild Awards
- 50th Writers Guild of America Awards
