= Leslie Ekker =

American special effects artist

- Born: Leslie George Ekker; August 15, 1955 (age 70); Hollywood, California, USA
- Occupation: Visual effects artist
- Years active: 1977-present

Leslie Ekker (born August 15, 1955 in Hollywood, California) is an American special effects artist who was nominated at the 68th Academy Awards in the category of Best Visual Effects. He was nominated for the film Apollo 13, along with Michael Kanfer, Robert Legato and Matt Sweeney.

== Selected filmography ==
- Star Trek: The Motion Picture (1979)
- Blade Runner (1982)
- The Adventures of Buckaroo Banzai Across the 8th Dimension (1984)
- Edward Scissorhands (1990)
- Hook (1991)
- True Lies (1994)
- Apollo 13 (1995)
- Titanic (1997)
