= Matthew Sweeney (disambiguation) =

Matthew Sweeney was a poet.

Matt(hew) Sweeney may also refer to:

- Matt Sweeney, musician
- Matt Sweeney (special effects artist), visual effects artist of Apollo 13
- Matthew Sweeney (baseball), see 2009 in baseball
- Matt Sweeney (athlete) on List of Australian athletics champions
