= Mark Lasoff =

Visual effects artist

- Born: Mark A. Lasoff
- Education: University of Delaware (B.S.), University of Maryland (M.S.)
- Occupation: Visual effects artist
- Years active: 1990-present

Mark Lasoff is a visual effects artist notable for winning an Oscar for the 1997 film Titanic.

== Career ==
Lasoff received his undergraduate degree in electrical engineering University of Delaware and later his Master's in computer science from the University of Maryland.

He won at the 70th Academy Awards for the film Titanic, he shared his win with Thomas L. Fisher, Michael Kanfer, and Robert Legato. This was in the category of Best Visual Effects.

Lasoff is currently a professor of visual effects at the Savannah College of Art and Design.

== Selected filmography ==
- Total Recall (1990)
- In the Line of Fire (1993)
- Apollo 13 (1995)
- Titanic (1997)
- The Scorpion King (2002)
