= Daniel Snyder (disambiguation) =

Daniel Snyder (born 1964) is an American businessman who formerly owned the Washington Redskins / Commanders.

Dan or Daniel Snyder may also refer to:

- Dan Snyder (ice hockey) (1978–2003), Canadian ice hockey player
- Daniel J. Snyder, American TV and film producer
- Daniel John Snyder Jr. (1916–1980), United States federal judge

== See also ==
- Dan Schneider (disambiguation)
