= Dan Schneider (disambiguation) =

Dan Schneider (born 1966) is an American actor and television producer.

Dan Schneider may also refer to:

- Dan Schneider (writer) (born 1965), American poet, writer, and film critic
- Dan Schneider (baseball) (born 1942), American baseball player
- Daniel Schneider, one of the perpetrators of the 2007 bomb plot in Germany

== See also ==
- Daniel Schnider (born 1973), Swiss cyclist
- Daniel Schnyder (born 1961), Swiss jazz reedist and composer
- Daniel Schneidermann (born 1958), French journalist
- Daniel Snyder (disambiguation)
