= Competency porn =

Form of escapism

Competency porn, or competence porn, is a term describing media that portrays competency, qualification, intelligence, and other rigorous, capable qualities. Coined in 2009 by screenwriter John Rogers, it has often been used in coverage regarding television shows like The Pitt and The Diplomat and movies like Apollo 13.

== History and definition ==
The term "competence porn" was defined by John Rogers, the screenwriter of Leverage, in 2009 as "a shorthand way to talk about the very specific kind of satisfaction that we feel when watching folks competently handle complex situations using the kinds of specialized skills and expertise that we can all appreciate." While often used for television shows and movies, it has also been used to refer to YouTube videos and other online content.

In 2020, book critic Kimberly Chrisman-Campbell applied the term to romance fiction, pointing out that many novels involving "dating in the digital age" involve competence, or "the all-too-rare spectacle of mutual respect between two grown-ass adults at the top of their personal and professional games."

On January 13, 2026, Jada Yuan, writing for The Washington Post, shifted the term to "competency porn" and applied it to shows like The Pitt and Industry, arguing that it became a means of escapism in light of the incompetence seen in news events. On the same day, The Guardian did a Pass Notes installment on the term, stating that "In 2026, when it feels as though the world is moments away from any number of disasters, there is nothing hotter than watching someone do their job really, really well."

== Examples ==
In 2024, Lifehacker compiled a list of thirty movies and television shows that could be considered competence porn, including Ocean's Eleven, Moneyball, Star Trek, and The Prestige, among others.

In a 2025 interview with NPR, ER and The Pitt actor Noah Wyle used the term "competency porn" to describe The Pitt's focus on accurately portraying technical medical scenes rather than drama or spectacle:

"One of the decisions we made early on was to not employ any soundtrack in the show... We're letting the sort of symphony of the sound of the procedures in the room be our cadence... And it's really less important the audience understands and more important that the audience sees that the doctors know what they're talking about. It's competency porn."

In 2026, Yuan listed The Pitt, The Diplomat, Industry, Abbott Elementary, Star Trek: Starfleet Academy, Hijack, Pluribus, and Survivor as examples of competency porn.
