= Matt Sweeney (special effects artist) =

American visual effects artist (1948–2024)

- Born: Matthew Sweeney; April 1948
- Died: February 19, 2024 (aged 75); Burbank, California, U.S.
- Occupation: Visual effects artist
- Years active: 1979–2009
- Spouse: Lucinda Foy (m. 2020)

Matthew Sweeney (April 1948 – February 19, 2024) was an American special effects artist who was nominated at the 68th Academy Awards in the category of Best Visual Effects along with Leslie Ekker, Michael Kanfer and Robert Legato. They were nominated for their work on the film Apollo 13.

Sweeney died in Burbank on February 19, 2024, at the age of 75, from prolonged lung cancer.

== Awards ==
Sweeney received 3 Technical Achievement Awards at the Academy Awards.

- 59th Academy Awards: For the development of an automatic capsule gun for simulating bullet hits for motion picture special effects (with Lucinda Strub).
- 70th Academy Awards: For the development and realization of Liquid Synthetic Air (with James F. Foley, Charles Converse and F. Edward Gardner (of UCISCO); and to Robert W. Stoker, Jr.).
- 74th Academy Awards: For the concept, design and realization of the "Mic Rig" (with Mic Rodgers)

== Selected filmography ==
- The Goonies (1985)
- American Flyers (1985)
- The Color Purple (1985)
- The Lost Boys (1987)
- Big Top Pee-wee (1988)
- Lethal Weapon 2 (1989)
- Rockula (1990)
- Arachnophobia (1990)
- Lethal Weapon 2 (1992)
- Falling Down (1993)
- Maverick (1994)
- Natural Born Killers (1994)
- Apollo 13 (1995)
- The Cable Guy (1996)
- Batman & Robin (1997)
- Lethal Weapon 4 (1998)
- Galaxy Quest (1999)
- The Fast and the Furious: Tokyo Drift (2006)
- Knocked Up (2007)
- Role Models (2008)
- Fast and Furious (2009)
- Fast Five (2011)
- Furious 7 (2015)
