= Jeff Maguire =

American screenwriter (born 1952)

- Born: 1952 (age 73–74); United States
- Education: Hampshire College
- Occupation: Screenwriter

Jeff Maguire (born 1952) is an American screenwriter.

Regarded for his talent for writing sports films, Maguire got his first screenwriting break with his script Escape to Victory, a film about soccer directed by John Huston in 1981. His most recent contribution is Gridiron Gang, released in 2006. His most famous film is In the Line of Fire starring Clint Eastwood and directed by Wolfgang Petersen, for which he received a Best Original Screenplay Oscar nomination for 1993.

In 1990, Maguire was approached by producer Jeff Apple to develop Apple's Secret Service agent concept into a film treatment. Maguire was in debt to his relatives and about to have his utilities turned off when his script based on Apple's concept, "In the Line of Fire", went into a bidding war between stars Tom Cruise, Sean Connery, and Clint Eastwood. When he received a call from Eastwood congratulating him on the completed deal (more than $1 million), Jeff's wife reportedly had to return a dress so they could afford to go out to dinner to celebrate. Prior to this, various moguls had rejected and almost destroyed the story. The dead-broke writer spurned Cruise, but wound up with Eastwood and about $1 million.

Maguire is a graduate of Hampshire College, Amherst, Massachusetts. Raised in Greenwich, Connecticut, Maguire was once a railroad worker, a waiter, and a volunteer counselor with Mother Teresa's group, Missionaries of Charity, in the Pico-Union section of downtown Los Angeles, working primarily with Hispanic gangs. In the 1980s and 90s, he also frequented the famous Manhattan Beach, California video store Video Archives, where future filmmakers Quentin Tarantino and Roger Avary were clerks. Maguire is a follower of Meher Baba and has contributed to Baba's journal, Glow International.

== Filmography ==
- Victory (1981) (Story Only)
- Toby McTeague (with Jamie Brown and Djordje Milicevic) (1986)
- In the Line of Fire (1993)
- Timeline (with George Nolfi) (2003)
- Gridiron Gang (with Jac Flanders) (2006)
