= Apollo 13 (film) =

1995 film by Ron Howard

- Theatrical release poster
- Directed by: Ron Howard
- Screenplay by: William Broyles Jr. Al Reinert
- Based on: Lost Moon by: Jim Lovell; Jeffrey Kluger
- Produced by: Brian Grazer
- Starring: Tom Hanks; Kevin Bacon; Bill Paxton; Gary Sinise; Ed Harris; Kathleen Quinlan
- Cinematography: Dean Cundey
- Edited by: Daniel P. Hanley; Mike Hill
- Music by: James Horner
- Production company: Imagine Entertainment
- Distributed by: Universal Pictures
- Release date: June 30, 1995 (United States)
- Running time: 140 minutes
- Country: United States
- Language: English
- Budget: $52 million
- Box office: $355.2 million

Apollo 13 is a 1995 American docudrama film directed by Ron Howard and starring Tom Hanks, Kevin Bacon, Bill Paxton, Gary Sinise, Ed Harris and Kathleen Quinlan. The screenplay by William Broyles Jr. and Al Reinert dramatizes the aborted 1970 Apollo 13 lunar mission and is an adaptation of the 1994 book Lost Moon: The Perilous Voyage of Apollo 13, by astronaut Jim Lovell and Jeffrey Kluger.

The film tells the story of astronauts Jim Lovell, Jack Swigert, and Fred Haise aboard the ill-fated Apollo 13 for the United States' fifth crewed mission to the Moon, which was intended to be the third to land. En route, an on-board explosion deprives their spacecraft of much of its oxygen supply and electrical power, which forces NASA's flight controllers to abandon the Moon landing and improvise scientific and mechanical solutions to get the three astronauts to Earth safely. Howard went to great lengths to create a technically accurate movie, employing NASA's assistance in astronaut and flight-controller training for his cast and obtaining permission to film scenes aboard a reduced-gravity aircraft for realistic depiction of the weightlessness experienced by the astronauts in space.

Released in theaters by Universal Pictures in the United States on June 30, 1995, Apollo 13 received critical acclaim and was nominated for nine Academy Awards, including Best Picture (winning for Best Film Editing and Best Sound). The film also won the Screen Actors Guild Award for Outstanding Performance by a Cast in a Motion Picture, as well as two British Academy Film Awards. In total, the film grossed over $355 million worldwide during its theatrical releases, becoming the third-highest-grossing film of 1995. It is listed in The New York Times Guide to the Best 1,000 Movies Ever Made (2004). In 2023, the film was selected for preservation in the United States National Film Registry by the Library of Congress as being "culturally, historically or aesthetically significant."

== Plot ==
On July 20, 1969, astronaut Jim Lovell hosts a party where guests watch Neil Armstrong's televised first steps on the Moon from Apollo 11. Lovell, who orbited the Moon on Apollo 8, tells his wife Marilyn that he will return to the Moon to walk on its surface.

Three months later, as Lovell is conducting a VIP tour of NASA's Vehicle Assembly Building, his boss Deke Slayton informs him that his crew will fly Apollo 13 instead of 14, swapping flights with Alan Shepard's crew. Lovell, Ken Mattingly, and Fred Haise train for their mission. Days before launch in April 1970, Mattingly is exposed to German measles, and the flight surgeon demands his replacement with Mattingly's backup, Jack Swigert.

Lovell resists breaking up his team, but relents when Slayton threatens to bump his crew to a later mission. As the launch date approaches, Marilyn has a nightmare about her husband dying in space, and tells Lovell she will not go to Kennedy Space Center to see him off for an unprecedented fourth launch. She later changes her mind and surprises him.

On launch day, Flight Director Gene Kranz in Houston's Mission Control Center gives the go for launch. As the Saturn V rocket climbs through the atmosphere, a second stage engine cuts off prematurely, but the craft reaches its Earth parking orbit. After the third stage fires again to send Apollo 13 to the Moon, Swigert performs the maneuver to turn the Command Module Odyssey around to dock with the Lunar Module Aquarius and pull it away from the spent rocket.

Three days into the mission, by order of Mission Control, Swigert turns on the liquid oxygen stirring fans. An electrical short causes a tank to explode, emptying its contents into space and sending the craft tumbling. The other tank is soon found to be leaking. Consumables manager Sy Liebergot convinces Kranz that shutting off two of Odyssey's three fuel cells offers the best chance to stop the leak, but this does not work.

With only one fuel cell, mission rules dictate the Moon landing be aborted. Lovell and Haise power up Aquarius to use as a "lifeboat", while Swigert shuts down Odyssey to save its battery power for the return to Earth. Kranz charges his team with bringing the astronauts home, declaring "failure is not an option". Consumables manager John Aaron recruits Mattingly to help him improvise a procedure to restart Odyssey for the landing on Earth.

As the crew watches the Moon pass beneath them, Lovell laments his lost dream of walking on its surface, then turns his crew's attention to the business of getting home. With Aquarius running on minimal electrical power and rationed water supply, the crew suffers from freezing conditions, and Haise develops a urinary tract infection. Swigert suspects Mission Control is concealing the fact they are doomed; Haise angrily blames Swigert's inexperience for the accident, but Lovell quashes the argument.

As Aquarius's carbon dioxide filters run out, concentration of the gas approaches a dangerous level. Ground control improvises a "Rube Goldberg" device to make the Command Module's incompatible filter cartridges work in the Lunar Module. With Aquarius's navigation systems shut down, the crew makes a vital course correction manually by steering the Lunar Module and controlling its engine.

Mattingly and Aaron struggle to find a way to power up the Command Module systems without drawing too much power, and finally read the procedure to Swigert, who restarts Odyssey by drawing the extra power from Aquarius. When the crew jettisons the Service Module, they are surprised by the extent of the damage, raising the possibility that the ablative heat shield was compromised. As they release Aquarius and re-enter the Earth's atmosphere, no one is sure that Odyssey's heat shield is intact.

The tense period of radio silence due to ionization blackout is longer than normal, but the astronauts report all is well, and the world watches Odyssey splash down and celebrates their return. As helicopters bring the crew aboard the USS Iwo Jima for a hero's welcome, Lovell's voice-over describes the cause of the explosion, and the subsequent careers of Haise, Swigert, Mattingly, Kranz, and himself. He wonders if and when mankind will return to the Moon.

== Cast ==
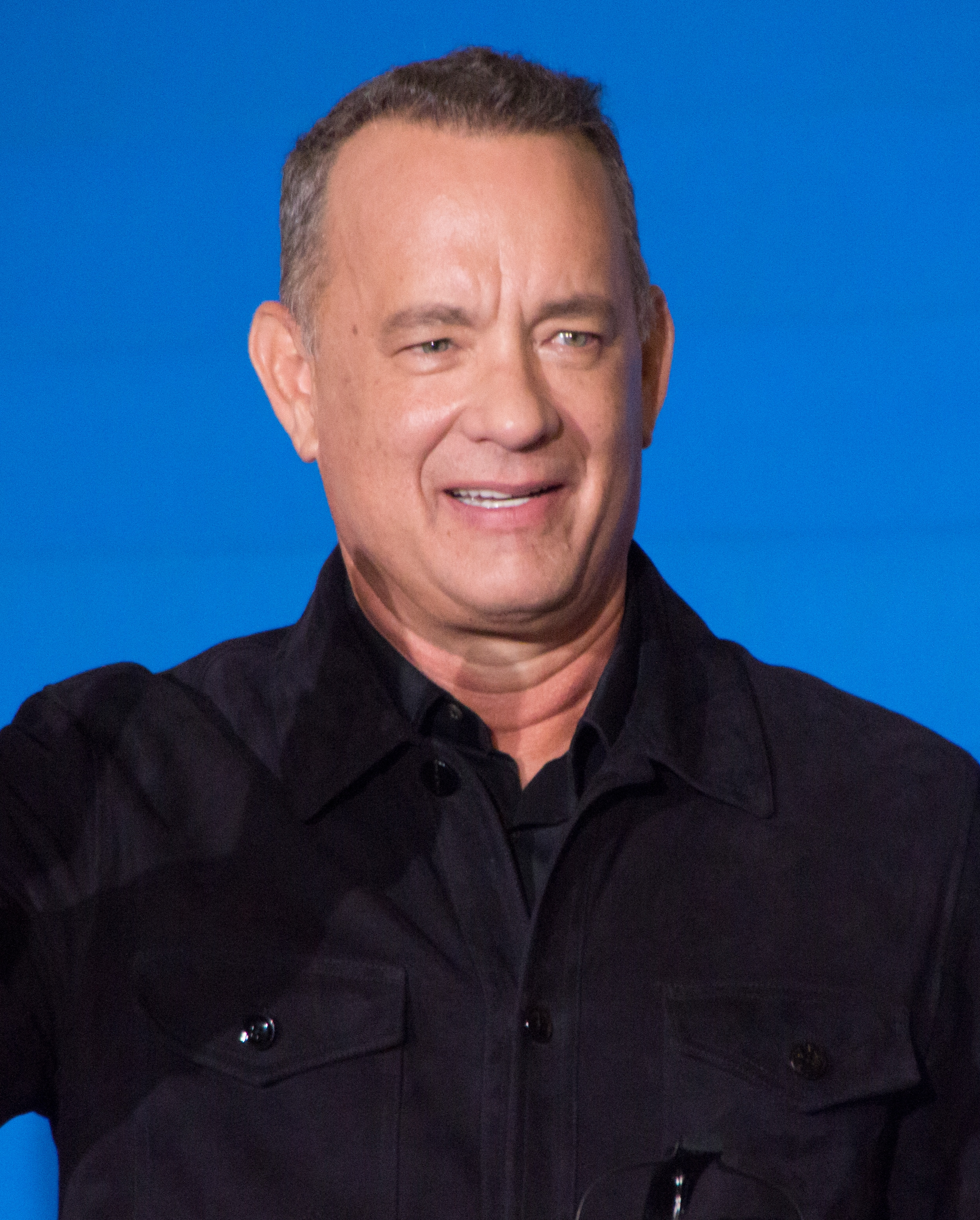
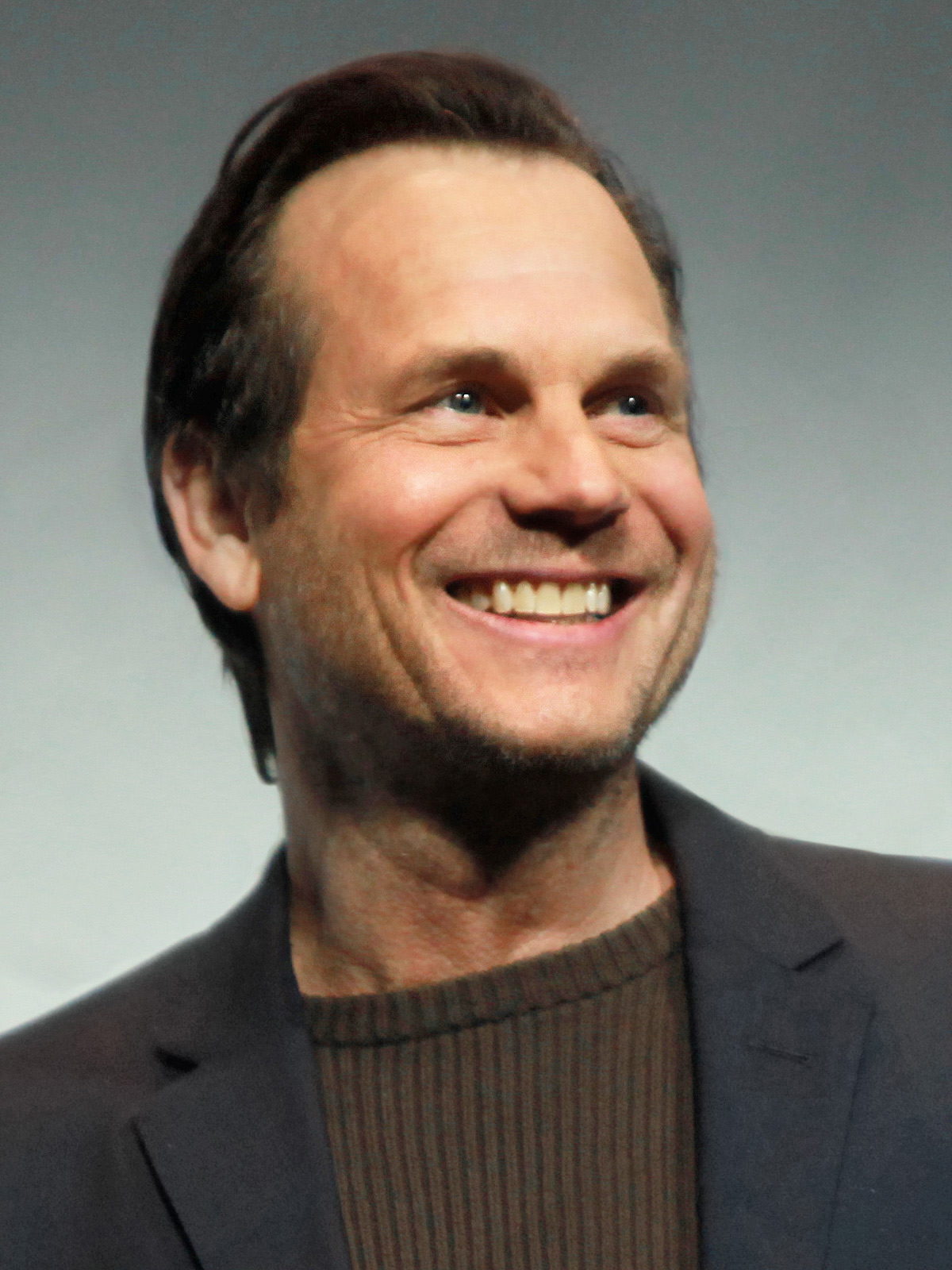
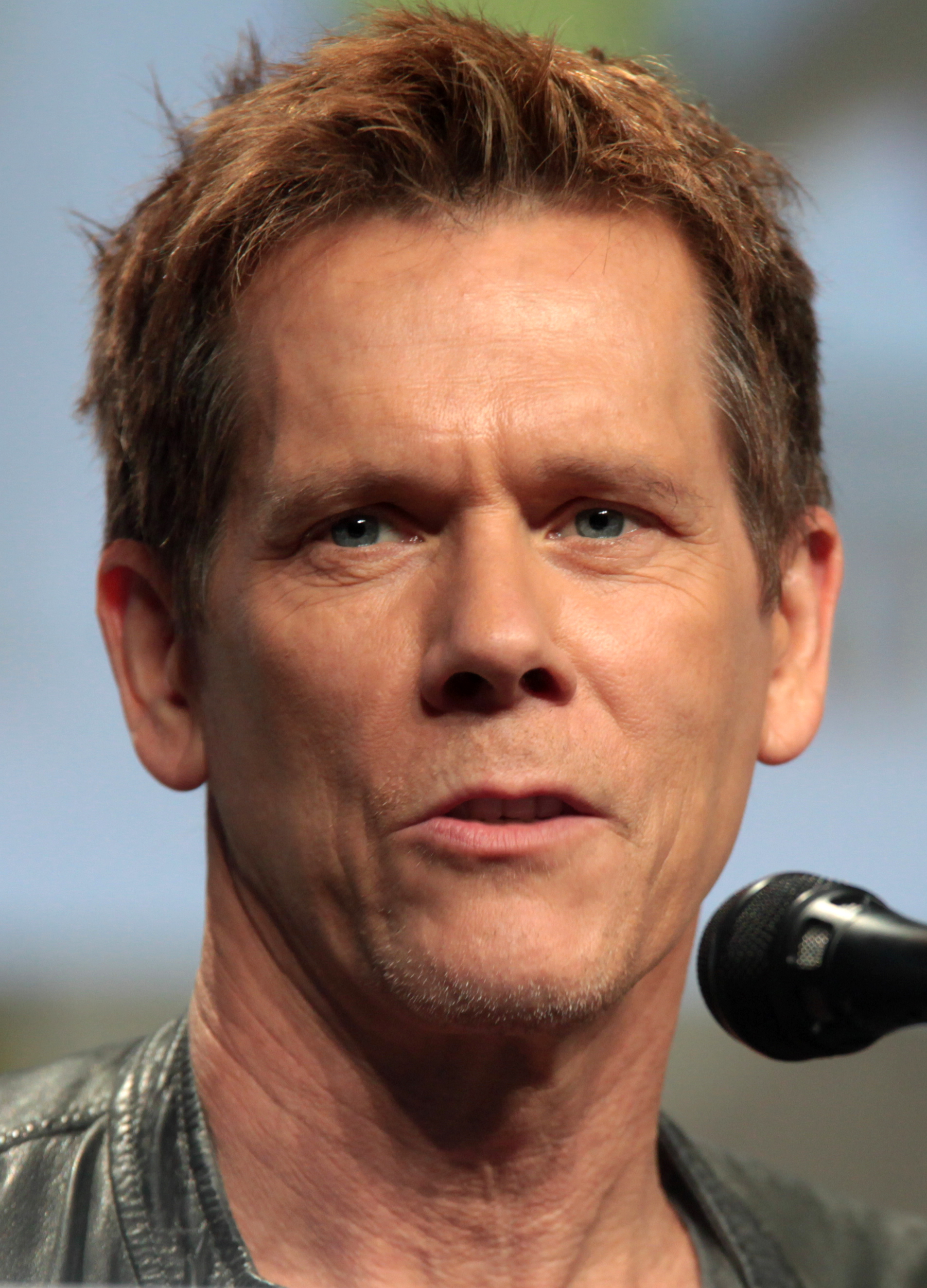
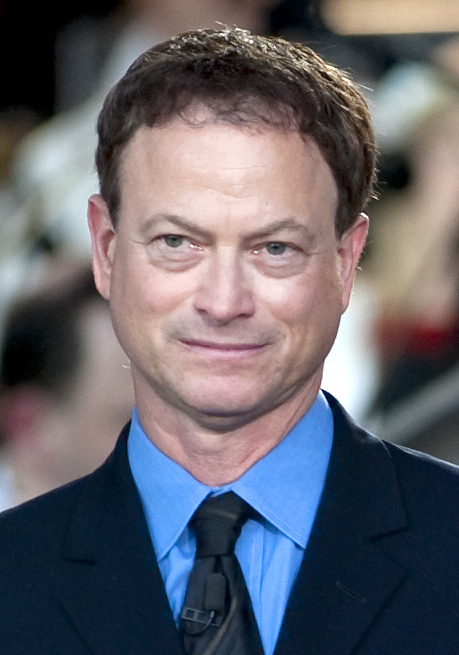
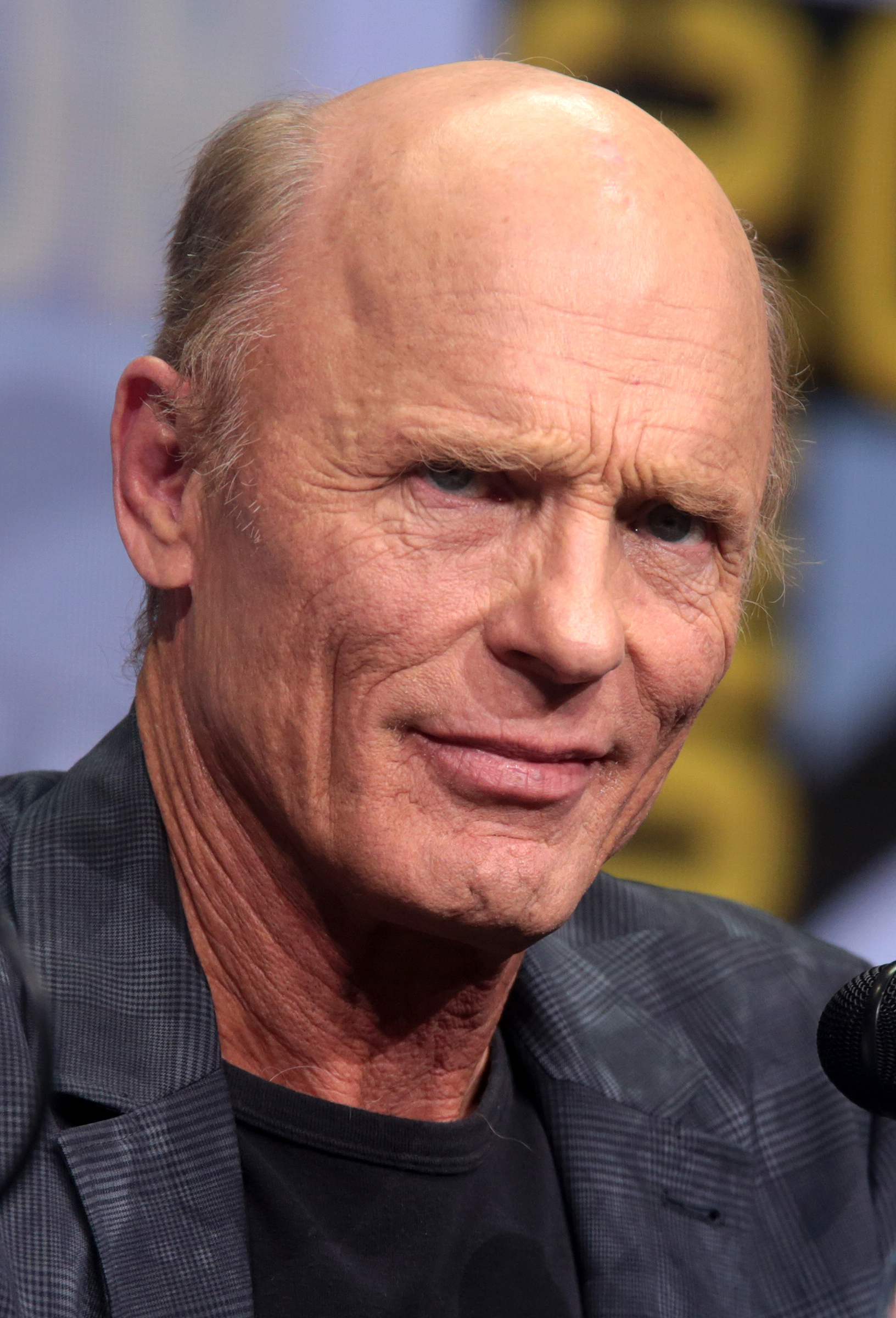
(Left to right) Tom Hanks (pictured in 2016), Bill Paxton (2014), Kevin Bacon (2014), Gary Sinise (2011), and Ed Harris (2017)

Apollo 13 crew:

- Tom Hanks as Commander Jim Lovell
- Bill Paxton as Lunar Module Pilot Fred Haise
- Kevin Bacon as backup Command Module Pilot Jack Swigert
- Gary Sinise as prime Command Module Pilot Ken Mattingly, who was grounded shortly before the mission

Other astronauts:

- Mark Wheeler as Apollo 11 Commander Neil Armstrong
- Larry Williams as Apollo 11 Lunar Module Pilot Buzz Aldrin
- David Andrews as Apollo 12 Commander Pete Conrad
- Ben Marley as Apollo 13 backup Commander John Young
- Brett Cullen as capsule communicator (CAPCOM) 1 "Andy" (a composite astronaut, based on Jack R. Lousma and William Pogue)
- Ned Vaughn as CAPCOM 2 (a composite astronaut)

NASA ground personnel:

- Ed Harris as White Team Flight Director Gene Kranz.
- Chris Ellis as Director of Flight Crew Operations Deke Slayton
- Joe Spano as NASA Director, a composite character loosely based on Manned Spacecraft Center director Christopher C. Kraft, Jr.
- Marc McClure as Black Team Flight Director Glynn Lunney
- Clint Howard as White Team Electrical, Environmental and Consumables Manager (EECOM) Sy Liebergot
- Ray McKinnon as White Team Flight Dynamics Officer (FIDO) Jerry Bostick
- Todd Louiso as White Team Flight Activities Officer (FAO)
- Gabriel Jarret as White Team Guidance, Navigation, and Controls Systems Engineer (GNC)
- Andy Milder as White Team Guidance Officer (GUIDO)
- Jim Meskimen as White Team Telemetry, Electrical, EVA Mobility Unit Officer (TELMU)
- Loren Dean as EECOM Arthur, a composite character largely based on EECOM John Aaron
- Christian Clemenson as Flight Surgeon Dr. Charles Berry
- Carl Gabriel Yorke as SIM (Simulator) 1
- Xander Berkeley as Henry Hurt, a fictional NASA Office of Public Affairs staff member
- Endre Hules as Günter Wendt, pad leader

Civilians:

- Kathleen Quinlan as Marilyn Gerlach Lovell, Jim's wife
- Jean Speegle Howard (Ron Howard's mother) as Blanche Lovell, Jim's mother
- Mary Kate Schellhardt as Barbara Lovell, Jim's older daughter
- Max Elliott Slade as James "Jay" Lovell, Jim's older son
- Emily Ann Lloyd as Susan Lovell, Jim's younger daughter
- Miko Hughes as Jeffrey Lovell, Jim's younger son
- Rance Howard (Ron Howard's father) as the Lovell family minister
- Tracy Reiner as Mary Haise, Fred's wife
- Michele Little as Jane Conrad

Cameos:

- Jim Lovell appears as Captain Leland Kirkemo of the recovery ship USS Iwo Jima; Howard had intended to make him an admiral, but Lovell himself, having retired as a captain, chose to appear in his actual rank (and wearing his own Navy uniform).
- Marilyn Lovell appears among the spectators during the launch sequence.
- Jeffrey Kluger appears as a television reporter.
- Horror film director Roger Corman, a mentor of Howard, appears as a congressman being given a VIP tour by Lovell of the Vehicle Assembly Building, as it had become something of a tradition for Corman to make a cameo appearance in his protégés' films.
- CBS News anchor Walter Cronkite appears in archive news footage and can be heard in newly recorded announcements, some of which he edited himself to sound more authentic.
- Cheryl Howard (Ron Howard's wife) and Bryce Dallas Howard (Ron Howard's eldest daughter) as uncredited background performers in the scene where the astronauts wave goodbye to their families.

== Production ==
=== Development ===
The movie rights to Jim Lovell's book Lost Moon were being shopped to potential buyers before it was written. He stated that his first reaction was that Kevin Costner would be a good choice to play him.

=== Pre-production ===
The original screenplay by William Broyles Jr. and Al Reinert was written with Costner in mind because of his facial similarities with Lovell. By the time Ron Howard acquired the director's position, Tom Hanks had expressed interest in doing a film based on Apollo 13. When Hanks' representative informed him that a script was being passed around he had it sent to him, and Costner's name never came up in serious discussion. Hanks was ultimately cast as Lovell because of his knowledge of Apollo and space history.

Because of his interest in aviation, John Travolta asked Howard for the role of Lovell, but was politely turned down, Bill Murray, Dan Aykroyd and Tommy Lee Jones were also considered for the role of Jim Lovell. John Cusack, Patrick Swayze, Joe Pesci and Rick Moranis were offered the role of Fred Haise but all turned it down, and the role went to Bill Paxton. Brad Pitt was offered the role of Jack Swigert but also turned it down in favor of Seven, so the role went to Kevin Bacon. Tom Cruise, Charlie Sheen and Michael J. Fox were also considered for the role of Swigert. Daniel Stern was the original choice to the role of Ken Mattingly but was busy filming Bushwhacked, Howard however was able to get Gary Sinise (who co-starred with Tom Hanks in Forrest Gump a year earlier) and asked if he would play any part and Sinise chose Mattingly. Kelsey Grammer and Christopher Lloyd were offered the role of Gene Kranz, but it ultimately went to Ed Harris.

After Hanks had been cast and construction of the spacecraft sets had begun, John Sayles rewrote the script. While planning the film, Howard decided that every shot would be original and that no mission footage would be used. The spacecraft interiors were constructed by the Kansas Cosmosphere and Space Center's Space Works, which also restored the Apollo 13 Command Module. Two individual Lunar Modules and two Command Modules were constructed for filming. Composed of some original Apollo materials, they were built so that different sections were removable, which allowed filming to take place inside them. Space Works also built modified Command and Lunar Modules for filming inside a Boeing KC-135 reduced-gravity aircraft, and the pressure suits worn by the actors, which are exact reproductions of those worn by the Apollo astronauts, right down to the detail of being airtight. When suited up with their helmets locked in place, the actors were cooled by and breathed air pumped into the suits, as in actual Apollo suits.

The Christopher C. Kraft Jr. Mission Control Center consisted of two control rooms on the second and third floors of Building 30 at the Johnson Space Center in Houston, Texas. NASA offered the use of the control room for filming, but Howard declined, opting instead to make his own replica. Production designer Michael Corenblith and set decorator Merideth Boswell were in charge of the construction of the Mission Control set at Universal Studios. It was equipped with giant rear-screen projection capabilities, and a complex set of computers with individual video feeds to all the flight controller stations. The actors playing the flight controllers could communicate with each other on a private audio loop. The Mission Control room built for the film was on the ground floor. One NASA employee, a consultant for the film, said the set was so realistic that he would leave at the end of the day and look for the elevator before he remembered he was not in Mission Control. The recovery ship USS Iwo Jima had been scrapped by the time the film was made, so her sister ship, New Orleans, was used instead.

To prepare for their roles in the film, Hanks, Paxton, and Bacon all attended the U.S. Space Camp in Huntsville, Alabama. While there, astronauts Jim Lovell and David Scott, commander of Apollo 15, did actual training exercises with the actors inside a simulated Command Module and Lunar Module. The actors were also taught about each of the 500 buttons, toggles, and switches used to operate the spacecraft. The actors then traveled to Johnson Space Center in Houston, where they flew in the KC-135 to simulate weightlessness in outer space.

Each member of the cast performed extensive research for the project to provide an authentic story. Technical adviser Scott was impressed with their efforts, stating that each actor was determined to make every scene technically correct, word for word.

In Los Angeles, Ed Harris and all the actors portraying flight controllers enrolled in a Flight Controller School led by Gerry Griffin, an Apollo 13 flight director, and flight controller Jerry Bostick. The actors studied audiotapes from the mission, reviewed hundreds of pages of NASA transcripts, and attended a crash course in physics.

Reportedly, Pete Conrad expressed interest in appearing in the film.

=== Filming ===
For actors, being able to actually shoot in zero gravity as opposed to being in incredibly painful and uncomfortable harnesses for special effects shots was all the difference between what would have been a horrible moviemaking experience as opposed to the completely glorious one that it actually was.

— Tom Hanks

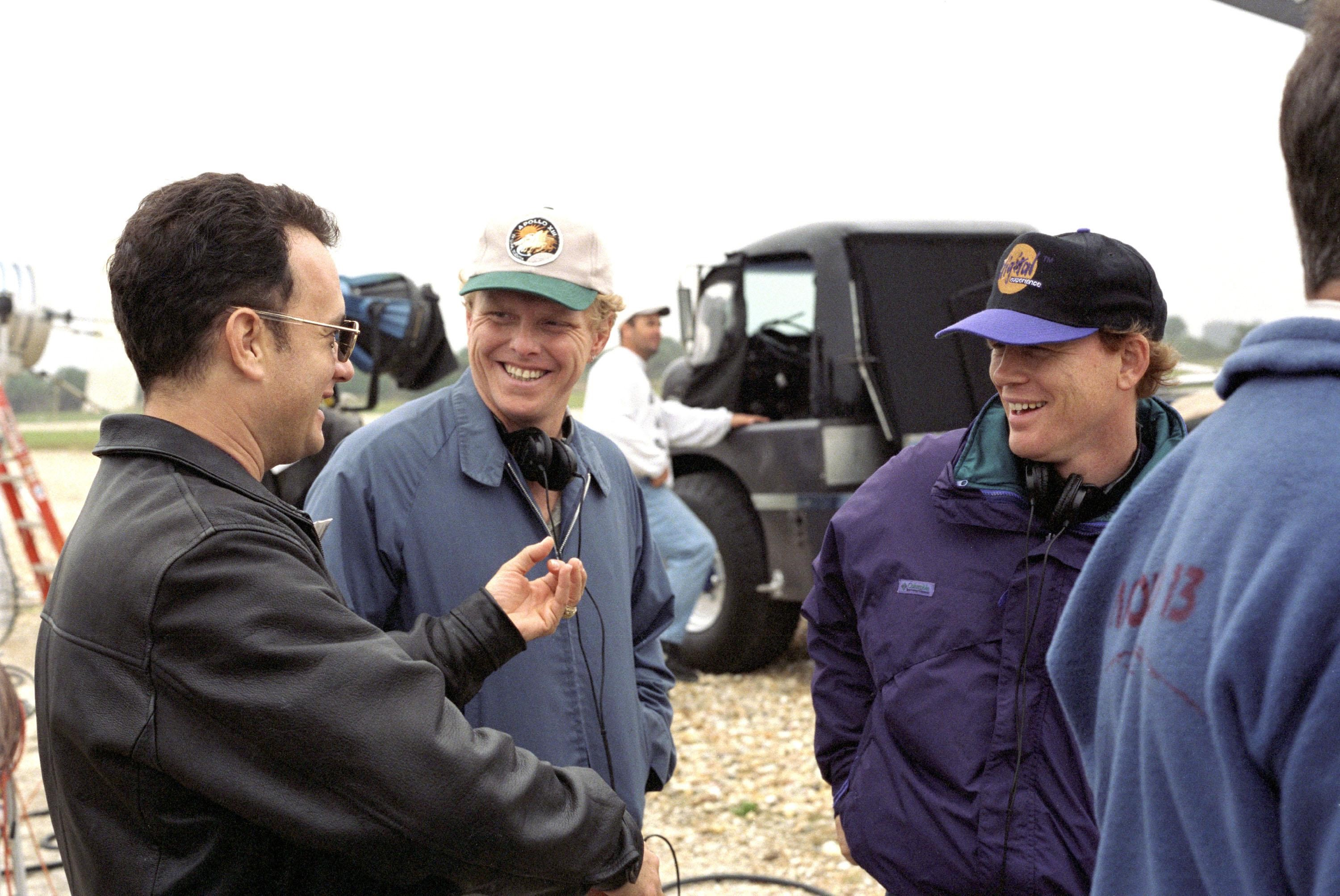
Ron Howard (right) with Tom Hanks (left) and the production crew during filming at the KSC in December 1994

Principal photography for Apollo 13 started in August 1994. Howard anticipated difficulty in portraying weightlessness in a realistic manner. He discussed this with Steven Spielberg, who suggested filming aboard the KC-135 airplane, which can be flown in such a way as to create about 23 seconds of weightlessness, a method NASA has always used to train its astronauts for space flight. Howard obtained NASA's permission and assistance to obtain three hours and 54 minutes of filming time in 612 zero-g maneuvers. Filming in this environment was a time and cost saver because the stage recreation and computer graphics would have been expensive. The final three weeks of filming took place in the stages on the Universal Studios Lot in Universal City, California, where two life-size replicas of both the command module and the lunar module were built for simultaneous shooting on different soundstages. Air-cooling units lowered the temperatures inside each soundstage to around 38 °F (3 °C), to simulate the conditions necessary for condensation and the visibility of the actors' breath inside the spacecraft. Filming wrapped on February 25, 1995. The final scene to be filmed was the splashdown sequence at the film's conclusion, which was shot on a large, artificial lake on the Universal lot.

==== Safety ====
While filming in a 25-second burst of weightlessness was "charged and frenetic", the cast and crew only suffered from bumps and bruises, and most injuries occurred when they bumped on non-padded items. The cast and crew of Apollo 13 describe the weightlessness experience as being in a "vomit comet" and "roller coaster ride", but the motion sickness afflicted only a few members.

During filming of the low-temperature scenes in the Universal stages, signs that explained frostbite symptoms were posted on the stages' walls, and the crew worked in parkas.

=== Post-production ===
The visual effects supervisor was Robert Legato. To avoid awkward visible switches to stock news footage in a live action film, he decided to produce the Saturn V launch sequence using miniature models and digital image stitching to create a panoramic background. On Howard's request to "shoot it like Martin Scorsese would shoot it", Legato studied Scorsese's scenes of pool games from The Color of Money, and copied his technique of creating a sense of rhythm by repeating two or three frames between each cut (just enough to be undetectable) for the engine ignition sequence. Legato says this scene inspired James Horner's soundtrack music for the launch. The long-range shot of the vehicle in flight was filmed using a $25 1:144 scale model Revell kit, with the camera realistically shaking, and it was digitized and re-filmed off of a high resolution monitor through a black filter, slightly overexposed to keep it from "looking like a video game".

The exhaust of the attitude control thrusters was generated with computer-generated imagery (CGI). This was also attempted to show the astronaut's urine dump into space, but wasn't high enough resolution to look right, so droplets sprayed from an Evian bottle were photographed instead.

The producers wanted to use CGI to render the splashdown, but Legato adamantly insisted this would not look realistic. Real parachutes were used with a prop capsule tossed out of a helicopter.

During weightless filming, all of the dialogue had been rendered unusable by the loudness of the plane. This required Hanks, Bacon and Paxton to attend ADR sessions, where they redubbed all of the lines for the weightless scenes.

== Soundtrack ==
The score to Apollo 13 was composed and conducted by James Horner, and performed by the Hollywood Studio Symphony. The soundtrack was released in 1995 by MCA Records and has seven tracks of score, eight period songs used in the film, and seven tracks of dialogue by the actors at a total running time of nearly seventy-eight minutes. The music also features solos by vocalist Annie Lennox and Tim Morrison on the trumpet. The score was a critical success and garnered Horner an Academy Award nomination for Best Original Score.

== Release ==
=== Theatrical ===
Apollo 13 was released on June 30, 1995, in North America and on September 22, 1995, in the United Kingdom.

In September 2002, and for its 30th anniversary in September 2025, the film was re-released in IMAX. It is the first film to be digitally remastered using IMAX DMR technology.

=== Home media ===
Apollo 13 was released on VHS on November 21, 1995, and on LaserDisc the following week. On September 9, 1997, the film debuted on a THX certified widescreen VHS release.

A tenth-anniversary DVD of the film was released in 2005; it included both the original theatrical version and the IMAX version, along with several extras. The IMAX version has a 1.66:1 aspect ratio.

In 2006, Apollo 13 was released on HD DVD and, on April 13, 2010, it was released on Blu-ray as the 15th-anniversary edition on the 40th anniversary of the Apollo 13 accident. The film was released on 4K UHD Blu-ray on October 17, 2017.

== Box office ==
Apollo 13 earned $25,353,380 from 2,347 theaters during its opening weekend, which made up 14.7% of the total US gross. Upon its opening, it was ranked number one at the box office, beating Pocahontas, Batman Forever, Mighty Morphin Power Rangers: The Movie and Judge Dredd. Additionally, it surpassed Forrest Gump for having the largest opening weekend for a Tom Hanks film. The film also achieved Kevin Bacon's highest opening weekend, a record that lasted for five years until 2000, when Hollow Man replaced it. Within five days, Apollo 13 generated $38.5 million, becoming the second-highest five-day Fourth of July opening of all time, behind Terminator 2: Judgment Day. The weekend of the film's opening earned $154 million from ticket sales, surpassing the previous record held by the combined Thanksgiving 1992 openings of Aladdin, The Bodyguard and Home Alone 2: Lost in New York. It would continue to stay in the number one spot for three more weeks until it was dethroned by Waterworld. Earning $355,237,933, Apollo 13 was the third-highest-grossing film of 1995, behind Die Hard with a Vengeance and Toy Story (which also starred Hanks).

On September 19, 2025, Apollo 13 began a 30th anniversary re-release in IMAX screenings. As of September 21, 2025, the 2025 re-release has made $627,155 from screenings in 200 IMAX theaters.

Apollo 13 box office revenue
Source	Gross (US$)	% Total	All-time rank (unadjusted)
North America	$173,837,933	48.9%	229
Foreign	$181,400,000	51.1%	N/A
Worldwide	$355,237,933	100.0%	282

== Reception ==
On the review aggregator website Rotten Tomatoes, 94% of 150 critics' reviews are positive. The website's consensus reads: "In recreating the troubled space mission, Apollo 13 pulls no punches: it's a masterfully told drama from director Ron Howard, bolstered by an ensemble of solid performances". Metacritic, which uses a weighted average, assigned the film a score of 78 out of 100, based on 22 critics, indicating "generally favorable" reviews. Audiences surveyed by CinemaScore gave the film an average grade of "A" on an A+ to F scale.

=== Critical response ===
Roger Ebert of the Chicago Sun-Times praised the film in his review, saying: "This is a powerful story, one of the year's best films, told with great clarity and remarkable technical detail, and acted without pumped-up histrionics". Richard Corliss of Time highly praised the film, saying: "From lift-off to splashdown, Apollo 13 gives one hell of a ride." Edward Guthmann of San Francisco Chronicle gave a mixed review and wrote: "I just wish that Apollo 13 worked better as a movie, and that Howard's threshold for corn, mush and twinkly sentiment weren't so darn wide". Peter Travers of Rolling Stone praised the film and wrote: "Howard lays off the manipulation to tell the true story of the near-fatal 1970 Apollo 13 mission in painstaking and lively detail. It's easily Howard's best film".

Janet Maslin made the film an NYT Critics' Pick, calling it an "absolutely thrilling" film that "unfolds with perfect immediacy, drawing viewers into the nail-biting suspense of a spellbinding true story". According to Maslin, "like Quiz Show, Apollo 13 beautifully evokes recent history in ways that resonate strongly today. Cleverly nostalgic in its visual style (Rita Ryack's costumes are especially right), it harks back to movie making without phony heroics and to the strong spirit of community that enveloped the astronauts and their families. Amazingly, this film manages to seem refreshingly honest while still conforming to the three-act dramatic format of a standard Hollywood hit. It is far and away the best thing Mr. Howard has done (and Far and Away was one of the other kind)."

The academic critic Raymond Malewitz focuses on the DIY aspects of the "mailbox" filtration system to illustrate the emergence of an unlikely hero in late 20th-century American culture—"the creative, improvisational, but restrained thinker—who replaces the older prodigal cowboy heroes of American mythology and provides the country a better, more frugal example of an appropriate 'husband'." In contrast, Matt Goldberg of Collider referred to the movie as an example of competency porn.

Marilyn Lovell praised Quinlan's portrayal of her, stating she felt she could feel what Quinlan's character was going through, and remembered how she felt in her mind.

== Accolades ==
Year	Award	Category	Recipient	Result	Ref.
1996	Academy Awards	Best Picture	Brian Grazer	Nominated	
1996	Academy Awards	Best Actor in a Supporting Role	Ed Harris	Nominated	
1996	Academy Awards	Best Actress in a Supporting Role	Kathleen Quinlan	Nominated	
1996	Academy Awards	Best Screenplay Based on Material Previously Produced or Published	William Broyles Jr. and Al Reinert	Nominated	
1996	Academy Awards	Best Art Direction	Art Direction: Michael Corenblith; Set Decoration: Merideth Boswell	Nominated	
1996	Academy Awards	Best Film Editing	Mike Hill and Daniel Hanley	Won	
1996	Academy Awards	Best Original Dramatic Score	James Horner	Nominated	
1996	Academy Awards	Best Sound	Rick Dior, Steve Pederson, Scott Millan and David MacMillan	Won	
1996	Academy Awards	Best Visual Effects	Robert Legato, Michael Kanfer, Leslie Ekker and Matt Sweeney	Nominated	
1996	American Cinema Editors (Eddies)	Best Edited Feature Film	Mike Hill, Daniel P. Hanley	Nominated	
1996	American Society of Cinematographers	Outstanding Achievement in Cinematography in Theatrical Releases	Dean Cundey	Nominated	
1996	BAFTA Film Awards	Best Production Design	Michael Corenblith	Won	
1996	BAFTA Film Awards	Outstanding Achievement in Special Visual Effects	Robert Legato, Michael Kanfer, Matt Sweeney, Leslie Ekker	Won	
1996	BAFTA Film Awards	Best Cinematography	Dean Cundey	Nominated	
1996	BAFTA Film Awards	Best Editing	Mike Hill, Daniel Hanley	Nominated	
1996	BAFTA Film Awards	Best Sound	David MacMillan, Rick Dior, Scott Millan, Steve Pederson	Nominated	
1996	Casting Society of America (Artios)	Best Casting for Feature Film, Drama	Jane Jenkins, Janet Hirshenson	Nominated	
1996	Chicago Film Critics Association Awards	Best Cinematography	Dean Cundey	Nominated	
1996	Chicago Film Critics Association Awards	Best Director	Ron Howard	Nominated	
1996	Chicago Film Critics Association Awards	Best Picture	Apollo 13	Won	
1996	Chicago Film Critics Association Awards	Best Original Score	James Horner	Nominated	
1996	Chicago Film Critics Association Awards	Best Supporting Actor	Ed Harris	Nominated	
1996	Chicago Film Critics Association Awards	Best Supporting Actress	Kathleen Quinlan	Nominated	
1996	Directors Guild of America Awards	Outstanding Directorial Achievement in Motion Pictures	Ron Howard, Carl Clifford, Aldric La'Auli Porter, Jane Paul	Won	
1996	Golden Globe Awards	Best Supporting Actor – Motion Picture	Ed Harris	Nominated	
1996	Golden Globe Awards	Best Supporting Actress – Motion Picture	Kathleen Quinlan	Nominated	
1996	Golden Globe Awards	Best Director – Motion Picture	Ron Howard	Nominated	
1996	Golden Globe Awards	Best Motion Picture – Drama	Apollo 13	Nominated	
1996	Heartland Film Festival	Studio Crystal Heart Award	Jeffrey Kluger	Won	
1996	Hugo Awards	Best Dramatic Presentation	Apollo 13	Nominated	
1996	Kids' Choice Awards	Favorite Movie Actor	Tom Hanks	Nominated	
1996	MTV Movie Awards	Best Male Performance	Tom Hanks as Jim Lovell	Nominated	
1996	MTV Movie Awards	Best Movie	Apollo 13	Nominated	
1996	PGA Awards	Motion Picture Producer of the Year Award	Brian Grazer, Todd Hallowell	Won	
1996	Saturn Awards	Best Action / Adventure / Thriller Film	Apollo 13	Nominated	
1996	Screen Actors Guild Awards	Outstanding Performance by a Male Actor in a Supporting Role	Ed Harris	Won	
1996	Screen Actors Guild Awards	Outstanding Performance by a Cast in a Motion Picture	Kevin Bacon, Tom Hanks, Ed Harris, Bill Paxton, Kathleen Quinlan, and Gary Sinise	Won	
1996	Space Foundation's Douglas S. Morrow Public Outreach Award	Best Family Feature – Drama	Apollo 13	Won	
1996	Writers Guild of America Awards	Best Screenplay Adapted from Another Medium	William Broyles Jr., Al Reinert	Nominated	
1996	Young Artist Awards	Best Family Feature – Drama	Apollo 13	Nominated	
2005	American Film Institute	AFI's 100 Years... 100 Movie Quotes	"Houston, we have a problem." (#50)	Won	
2006	American Film Institute	AFI's 100 Years... 100 Cheers	Apollo 13 (#12)	Won	

== Technical and historical accuracy ==
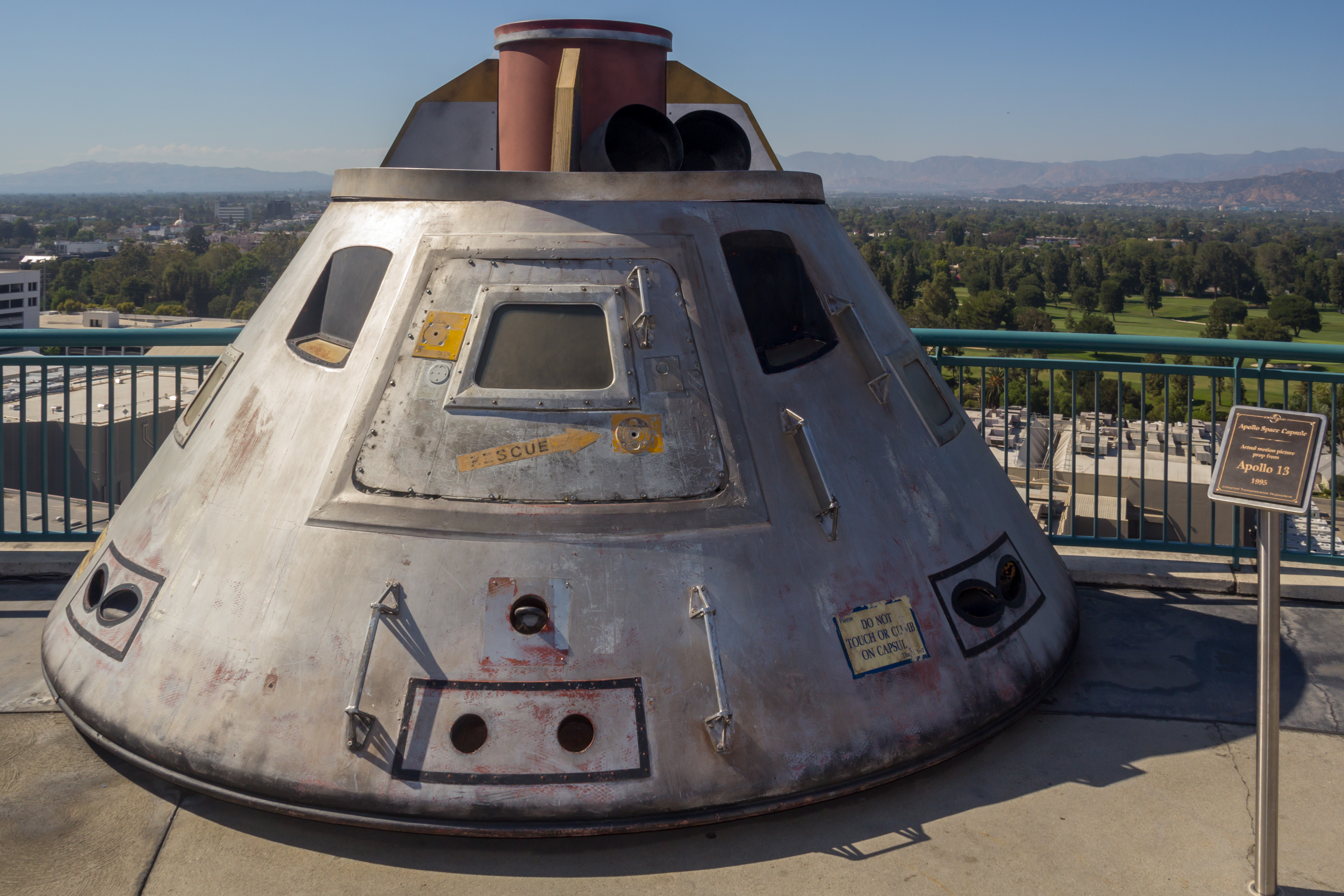
Apollo 13 Command Module prop from the film.

In the film, Lovell tells his wife he was given command of Apollo 13 instead of 14 because the original commander, Alan Shepard's, "ear infection is flaring up again"; in fact, Shepard had no "ear infection", but had been grounded since 1963 by Ménière's disease. This was surgically corrected four years later, and he was returned to flight duty in May 1969, but Manned Spacecraft Center management felt he needed more training time for a lunar mission.

The film portrays the Saturn V launch vehicle being rolled out to the launch pad two days before launch. In reality, the launch vehicle was rolled out on the Mobile Launcher using the crawler-transporter two months before the launch date.

The film depicts the crew hearing a bang shortly after Swigert followed directions from mission control to stir the oxygen and hydrogen tanks. In reality, the crew heard the bang 95 seconds later.

The film depicts Sy Liebergot suggesting that the oxygen leak was in one or two of Odyssey's fuel cells, and the order to shut them down passed up to the crew, forcing abortion of the lunar landing mission. In reality, Mission Control did not order the shutdown; Haise found the cells were already dead, because of starvation due to the damage to the oxygen system.

The film depicts Swigert and Haise arguing about who was at fault. In the television show The Real Story: Apollo 13, broadcast on the Smithsonian Channel, Haise states that no such argument took place and that there was no way anyone could have foreseen that stirring the tank would cause problems. Similarly, on the BBC 13 Minutes to the Moon program, the backup lunar module pilot on the mission, Charles Duke, says the film portrayed Swigert as unprepared for the flight but that it was untrue, and that Swigert was very familiar with the Command Module, as he had been involved with its development during his time as an engineering test pilot at North American Aviation, prior to becoming an astronaut.

The dialogue between ground control and the astronauts was taken nearly verbatim from transcripts and recordings, with few exceptions. One of them is the tagline, "Houston, we have a problem". (This quote was voted #50 on the list "AFI's 100 Years... 100 Movie Quotes".) According to recorded audio of the air-to-ground communications, the actual words uttered by Swigert were "Okay, Houston, we've had a problem here." Ground control responded by saying, "This is Houston. Say again, please." Jim Lovell then repeated, "Houston, we've had a problem."

Another exception comes after the re-entry blackout. In the film, Lovell says, "Hello Houston... this is Odyssey... it's good to see you again." In the actual re-entry, the Command Module's transmission was finally received by a Sikorsky SH-3D Sea King recovery helicopter, which then relayed its communications to Mission Control. The CAPCOM astronaut Joe Kerwin (not Mattingly, who serves as CAPCOM in this scene in the film) then made a call to the spacecraft, saying, "Odyssey, Houston standing by. Over." Swigert, not Lovell, replied "Okay, Joe." Unlike in the film, this occurred well before the parachutes deployed, but it was visual confirmation of their deployment that triggered the celebrations depicted at Mission Control.

The tagline "Failure is not an option," said in the film by Gene Kranz, also became very popular but was not taken from the historical transcripts. The following story, from an e-mail by Apollo 13 Flight Dynamics Officer Jerry Bostick, relates the origin of the phrase:

As far as the expression "Failure is not an option," you are correct that Kranz never used that term. In preparation for the movie, the script writers, Al Reinart and Bill Broyles, came down to Clear Lake to interview me on "What are the people in Mission Control really like?" One of their questions was "Weren't there times when everybody, or at least a few people, just panicked?" My answer was "No, when bad things happened, we just calmly laid out all the options, and failure was not one of them. We never panicked, and we never gave up on finding a solution." I immediately sensed that Bill Broyles wanted to leave and assumed that he was bored with the interview. Only months later did I learn that when they got in their car to leave, he started screaming, "That's it! That's the tag line for the whole movie, Failure is not an option. Now we just have to figure out who to have say it." Of course, they gave it to the Kranz character, and the rest is history.

One of the film's most significant departures from history is its depiction of Flight Director Gene Kranz and his White Team as managing all of the essential parts of the flight, from liftoff to landing. Consequently, the actual role of the other flight directors and teams, especially Glynn Lunney and his Black Team, are neglected. In fact, it was Flight Director Lunney and his team who got Apollo 13 through its most critical period in the hours immediately after the explosion, including the mid-course correction that sent the mission on a "free return" trajectory around the Moon and back to the Earth. The astronaut Ken Mattingly, who was replaced as Apollo 13 Command Module Pilot at the last minute by Swigert, later said:

If there was a hero, Glynn Lunney was, by himself, a hero, because when he walked in the room, I guarantee you, nobody knew what the hell was going on. Glynn walked in, took over this mess, and he just brought calm to the situation. I've never seen such an extraordinary example of leadership in my entire career. Absolutely magnificent. No general or admiral in wartime could ever be more magnificent than Glynn was that night. He and he alone brought all of the scared people together. And you've got to remember that the flight controllers in those days were—they were kids in their thirties. They were good, but very few of them had ever run into these kinds of choices in life, and they weren't used to that. All of a sudden, their confidence had been shaken. They were faced with things that they didn't understand, and Glynn walked in there, and he just kind of took charge.

A DVD commentary track, recorded by Jim and Marilyn Lovell, included with the Signature Laserdisc, and later included on both DVD versions, mentions several more inaccuracies, all done for reasons of artistic license:

We were working and watching the controls during that time. Because we came in shallow, it took us longer coming through the atmosphere where we had ionization. And the other thing was that we were just slow in answering.

— Jim Lovell, on the real reason for the delay in replying after Apollo 13's four-minute re-entry into Earth's atmosphere
- In the film, Mattingly plays a key role in solving a power consumption problem that Apollo 13 faced as it approached re-entry. Lovell points out in his commentary that there were several astronauts and engineers—including Charles Duke (whose rubella led to Mattingly's grounding)—who worked to solve that problem.
- When Swigert is getting ready to dock with the Lunar Module, a concerned NASA technician says: "If Swigert can't dock this thing, we don't have a mission." Lovell and Haise also seem worried. In his DVD commentary, Jim Lovell says that if Swigert had been unable to dock with the module, he himself or Haise could have done it. He also says that Swigert was a well-trained Command Module Pilot and no one was really worried about whether he was up to the job but admits that the depicted uncertainty made a nice subplot for the film. What the astronauts were really worried about, Lovell says, was the planned expected rendezvous between the Lunar Module and the Command Module after Lovell and Haise left the surface of the Moon (which was aborted by the emergency).
- A scene set the night before the launch, showing the astronauts' family members saying their goodbyes while separated by a road, to reduce the possibility of any last-minute transmission of disease, depicted a tradition that did not begin until the Space Shuttle program.
- The film depicts Marilyn Lovell accidentally dropping her wedding ring down a shower drain. According to Jim Lovell, this did occur, but the drain trap caught the ring and his wife was able to retrieve it. Lovell has also confirmed that the scene in which his wife had a nightmare about him being "sucked through an open door of a spacecraft into outer space" did occur, though he believes it was prompted by a scene in Marooned, a 1969 film about astronauts trapped on an experimental space station, which they saw three months before Apollo 13 launched.

When the three astronauts are putting on their spacesuits, the NASA "worm" logo can be clearly seen on the glass behind Kevin Bacon, but that logo was not used until 1975.

== See also ==
- From the Earth to the Moon, a 1998 docudrama mini-series based around the Apollo missions
- Gravity, a 2013 film about astronauts stranded in Earth orbit
- Survival film
- 1970s nostalgia
