= In the Line of Fire =

1993 political action thriller film by Wolfgang Petersen

- Theatrical release poster
- Directed by: Wolfgang Petersen
- Written by: Jeff Maguire
- Produced by: Jeff Apple
- Starring: Clint Eastwood; John Malkovich; Rene Russo; Dylan McDermott; Gary Cole; Fred Dalton Thompson; John Mahoney
- Cinematography: John Bailey
- Edited by: Anne V. Coates
- Music by: Ennio Morricone
- Production companies: Castle Rock Entertainment; Apple-Rose Productions
- Distributed by: Columbia Pictures
- Release date: July 9, 1993
- Running time: 128 minutes
- Country: United States
- Language: English
- Budget: $40 million
- Box office: $187 million

In the Line of Fire is a 1993 American political action thriller film directed by Wolfgang Petersen and starring Clint Eastwood, John Malkovich and Rene Russo. Written by Jeff Maguire, the film is about a disillusioned and obsessed former CIA operative who plans to assassinate the President of the United States and the Secret Service agent who is tracking him. Eastwood's character is the sole remaining active-duty Secret Service agent from the detail that was guarding John F. Kennedy in Dallas, Texas, at the time of his assassination in 1963. The film also stars Dylan McDermott, Gary Cole, John Mahoney, and Fred Dalton Thompson.

In the Line of Fire was co-produced by Columbia Pictures and Castle Rock Entertainment, with Columbia handling distribution. The film was a critical and commercial success, grossing $187 million against a $40 million production budget and earned three nominations at the 66th Academy Awards.

== Plot ==
Secret Service agent Frank Horrigan learns, in a routine investigation, that a mysterious man, who calls himself "Booth", is planning to assassinate the President of the United States (unnamed in the film). Booth soon makes a phone call to Horrigan and reveals that he understands Horrigan's history: he (Horrigan) was one of President Kennedy's bodyguards, but failed to protect JFK on the day of his assassination. Obsessed with his failure and tormented by feelings of guilt, Horrigan has become a cynical, loveless alcoholic, but now he requests to be assigned to protect the current President. His co-worker is the playful-but-businesslike Lily Raines.

Booth continues to call Horrigan from time to time, even though he realizes that his calls are being traced. He calls from public telephones and allows his calls to be traced, but escapes before the Secret Service can arrest him. He needles Horrigan for his failure to protect Kennedy but also calls him a "friend". Booth escapes Horrigan and at one site, he inadvertently leaves a palm print on a passing car. The Federal Bureau of Investigation matches the print, but because the person's identity is classified, the agency chooses not to disclose it to the Secret Service. The FBI does, however, notify the Central Intelligence Agency.

Horrigan learns that the assassin is in fact Mitch Leary, a skilled killer who used to work for the CIA, but suffered a mental breakdown and is now a "predator" seeking revenge on his former supervisors. Leary is also independently wealthy and tech-savvy. He is able to mold a zip gun out of composite material so as to evade metal detectors, and he can carry two small bullets past a metal detector concealed in a key-ring ornament. He is therefore in a position to carry a functional pistol into a fundraising event at which the President is scheduled to speak in person to the donors.

Al D'Andrea, one of Horrigan's underlings, confides to Horrigan that he intends to retire immediately because of nightmares about a previous incident in which he was almost killed, but Horrigan persuades him to remain on the case. The two of them succeed in catching up to Leary after tracing one of his phone calls. Leary flees to the top of a building; the two bodyguards chase Leary across Washington rooftops, where Leary shoots and kills D'Andrea but saves Horrigan from falling off as he clings to the side of the building.

As he supports Horrigan at the edge of the roof, Leary taunts Horrigan with his immediate dilemma: he (Horrigan) can save the President by shooting Leary, but then Horrigan will himself will take a deadly plunge. Horrigan is forced by circumstance to allow Leary escape: choosing to "save [his] ass", as Leary gleefully puts it, rather than save the President. Feelings of guilt over having failed to save D'Andrea on the rooftop further de-moralize Horrigan.

Arriving at the Westin Bonaventure Hotel in downtown Los Angeles, the location of the fundraiser, Horrigan receives an electronic communication containing some crucial information he had requested, and senses that Leary is there, disguised, and armed. As Leary draws his pistol and takes aim at the President, Horrigan jumps between them and saves the President's life, shouting "gun!" at the top of his voice. Leary fires his pistol, but Horrigan is wearing the regulation bulletproof vest. While the Secret Service hustles the President to safety, Leary kills another agent and takes Horrigan as a hostage and pulls him into one of the hotel's external glass elevators.

Horrigan is also wearing a regulation hidden microphone; he openly instructs Raines and sharpshooters to fire upon Leary. They fire but miss, shooting out the elevator's full-height windows. Horrigan takes advantage of the surprise and engages Leary in a ferocious, hand-to-hand combat in the small elevator. Leary falls through one of the ornamental windows and finds himself in the same position Horrigan was in before: hanging by his fingers from a precarious perch with only his arch-enemy to save him. Though Horrigan sincerely offers to pull him up to safety, Leary lets go, and falls to his death on a glass celling.

Upon returning home to Washington, and now a widely publicized hero, Horrigan announces his retirement. Horrigan shows Raines into his apartment, where an unexpected farewell message from Leary is found on Horrigan's answering machine. They play the message, in which Leary begins to commend Horrigan on his character, but Horrigan and Raines leave the apartment before the message ends. The final scene depicts Horrigan and Raines enjoying a romantic interlude at the Lincoln Memorial.

== Cast ==
- Clint Eastwood as Secret Service Agent Frank Horrigan
- John Malkovich as Mitch Leary / Joseph McCrawley / James Carney / Booth
- Rene Russo as Secret Service Agent Lilly Raines
- Dylan McDermott as Secret Service Agent Al D'Andrea
- Gary Cole as Secret Service Agent Bill Watts
- Fred Dalton Thompson as White House Chief of Staff Harry Sargent
- John Mahoney as Secret Service Director Sam Campagna
- Gregory Alan Williams as Secret Service Agent Matt Wilder
- Jim Curley as The President / Traveller
- Sally Hughes as The First Lady
- Tobin Bell as Marty Mendoza
- William G. Schilling as Sanford Riggs
- Cylk Cozart as Secret Service Agent Cozart
- Clyde Kusatsu as Secret Service Agent Jack Okura
- Steve Hytner as Secret Service Agent Tony Carducci
- Patrika Darbo as Pam Magnus
- John Heard as Professor Riger
- Steve Railsback as CIA Officer David Coppinger (uncredited)
- Joshua Malina as Secret Service Agent Chavez
- Walt MacPherson as Hunter

== Production ==
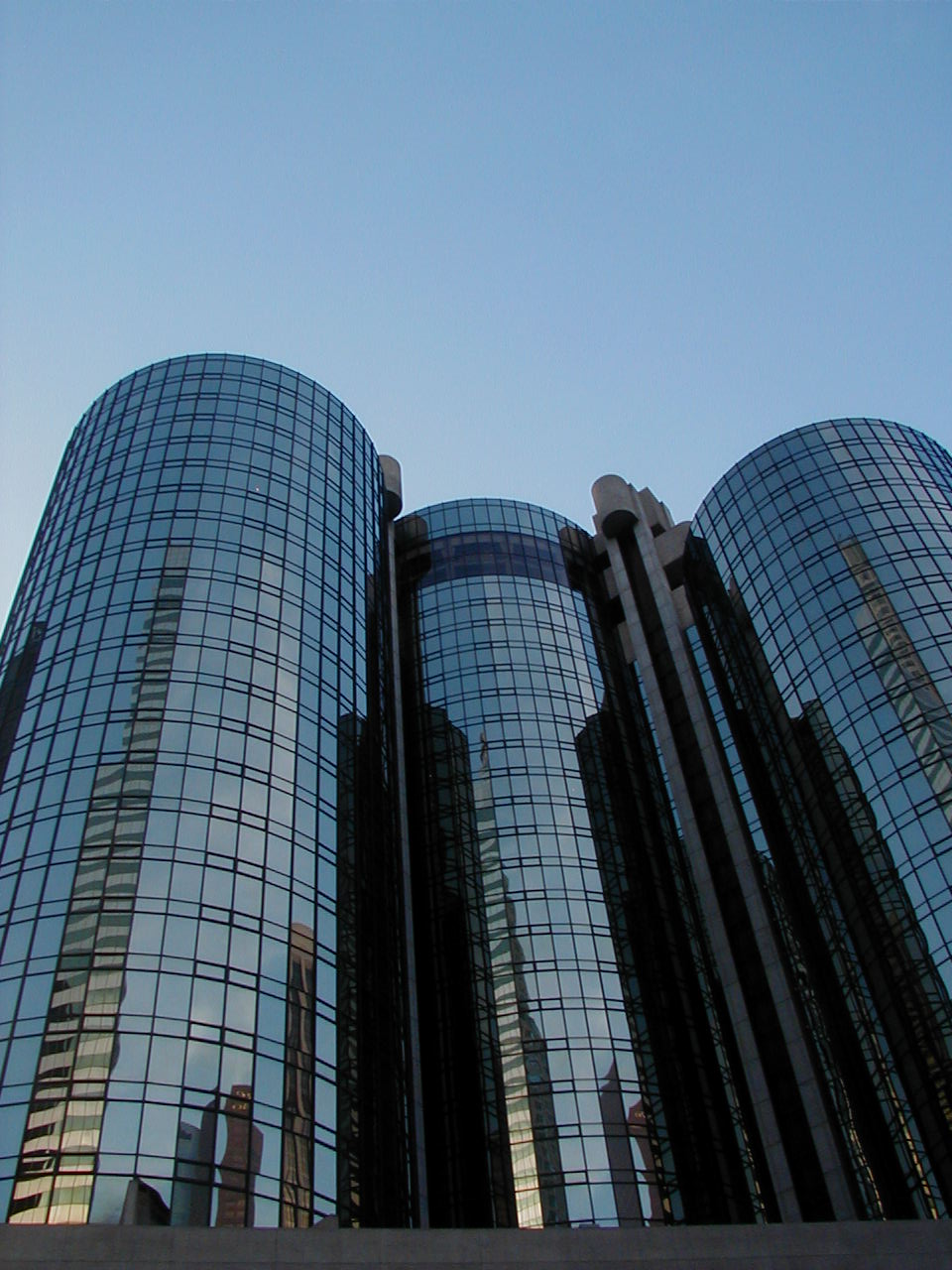
The climax of the film occurs at the Bonaventure Hotel, Los Angeles

Producer Jeff Apple began developing In the Line of Fire in the mid-1980s. He had planned on making a movie about a Secret Service Agent on detail during the Kennedy assassination since his boyhood. Apple was inspired and intrigued by a vivid early childhood memory of meeting Vice President Lyndon B. Johnson in person, surrounded by Secret Service Agents with earpieces in dark suits and sunglasses. The concept later struck Apple as an adolescent watching televised replays of the assassination of President John F. Kennedy.

After another writer's efforts fell short, Jeff Maguire came aboard in 1991 and completed the script that would become the movie. Disney rejected a treatment for television starring Tom Selleck, and after a bidding war Castle Rock Entertainment bought the script for $1.4 million in April 1992.

Clint Eastwood and Wolfgang Petersen offered the role of Leary to Robert De Niro, who turned it down due to scheduling conflicts with A Bronx Tale.

Filming began in late 1992 in Washington, D.C. Scenes in the White House were filmed on an existing set, while an Air Force One interior set had to be built at a cost of $250,000. The film's climactic scenes were shot inside the lobby and elevators of the Los Angeles Bonaventure Hotel. Earlier scenes of Frank and Lilly sharing intimate moments were filmed in the nearby Los Angeles Biltmore Hotel.

A subplot of the film is the President's re-election campaign. For the scenes of campaign rallies, the filmmakers used digitally altered footage from the campaign events of President George H. W. Bush and then-Governor Bill Clinton, including a campaign stop in Denver, Colorado.

The movie also inserted digitized images from 1960s Clint Eastwood movies into the Kennedy assassination scenes. As Jeff Apple described it to the Los Angeles Times, Eastwood "gets the world's first digital haircut".

The Secret Service cooperated with the production. An agency public affairs official said, "the project would have been done anyway ... We decided that it would be better for us to have some kind of control". The agency did not cooperate with contemporary films Dave and Guarding Tess, describing the former as "whimsical".

For In the Line of Fire, in addition to helping the second unit filming of the Bush and Clinton campaigns, Secret Service agents on the set helped scenes' authenticity. The agency concluded that "the project has been a great success. The Secret Service was able to ... make certain that our portrayal on the big screen was a positive one", and hoped that it would help in recruiting akin to "what Top Gun did for the Navy". Retired Assistant Director of the Secret Service Robert R. Snow said, "It's a story told through the eyes of an agent, his problems, and his experiences".

In an interview with Larry King, President Bill Clinton praised the film. Unsure if this endorsement would help or hurt the film, Petersen decided against using his quotes to market the film.

== Release ==
In the Line of Fire was released in United States theaters in July 1993. It was one of the first films to have a trailer for the film made available online. Offered via AOL, the trailer was downloaded 170 times in a week and a half.

=== Box office ===
The film earned $15 million in its opening weekend. It earned over $102 million in North America and $85 million in other territories, for a total of $187 worldwide, against a budget of approximately $40 million.

=== Critical response ===
On Rotten Tomatoes, In the Line of Fire has a 96% rating based on 73 reviews, with an average rating of 7.7/10. The site's consensus states: "A straightforward thriller of the highest order, In the Line of Fire benefits from Wolfgang Petersen's taut direction and charismatic performances from Clint Eastwood and John Malkovich." On Metacritic, it has a score of 74 out of 100 based on reviews from 16. Audiences polled by CinemaScore gave the film an average grade of "A" on an A+ to F scale.

Vincent Canby of The New York Times wrote: "It's movie making of the high, smooth, commercial order that Hollywood prides itself on but achieves with singular infrequency." Roger Ebert gave the film three and a half out of four, writing: "Most thrillers these days are about stunts and action. In the Line of Fire has a mind."

Kenneth Turan of the Los Angeles Times called the film "crisply entertaining". He praised the casting, "Malkovich’s insinuating, carefully thought out delivery is in the same way an ideal foil for Eastwood’s bluntly straightforward habits", and Eastwood "every part of this film trades so heavily on Eastwood’s presence that it is impossible to imagine it with anyone else in the starring role".

=== Accolades ===
==== 66th Academy Awards ====
- Nominated: Best Supporting Actor (John Malkovich)
- Nominated: Best Original Screenplay (Jeff Maguire)
- Nominated: Best Film Editing (Anne V. Coates)

==== 47th BAFTA Awards ====
- Nominated: Best Actor in a Supporting Role (John Malkovich)
- Nominated: Best Editing (Anne V. Coates)
- Nominated: Best Original Screenplay (Jeff Maguire)

==== Other awards ====
- 1994 Chicago Film Critics Association Award Nomination for Best Supporting Actor (John Malkovich)
- 1994 Golden Globe Award Nomination for Best Performance by an Actor in a Supporting Role (John Malkovich)
- 1994 MTV Movie Award Nomination for Best Villain (John Malkovich)
- AFI's 100 Years...100 Heroes and Villains (2003):
  - Mitch Leary – Nominated Villain

== Novelization ==
A novelization of the film was published by Jove Books. Author Max Allan Collins wrote the book in nine days.

== Bibliography ==
- Hughes, Howard (2009). Aim for the Heart. London: I. B. Tauris. ISBN 9781845119027.
