= 1998 Czech Lion Awards =

Czech film award ceremony

6th Czech Lion Awards
- Date: February 27, 1999
- Site: Lucerna, Prague
- Hosted by: Ondřej Havelka

Highlights
- Best Picture: Sekal Has to Die
- Best Actor: Olaf Lubaszenko; Sekal Has to Die
- Best Actress: Iva Janžurová; In the Rye
- Best Supporting Actor: Miroslav Donutil; Traps
- Best Supporting Actress: Agnieszka Siteková; Sekal Has to Die
- Most awards: Sekal Has to Die (10)
- Most nominations: Sekal Has to Die (13)

Television coverage
- Network: Česká televize

1999 Czech Lion Awards ceremony was held on 27 February 1999.

== Winners and nominees ==
Best Film	Best Director
Sekal Has to Die	Vladimír Michálek — Sekal Has to Die
Best Actor in a Leading Role	Best Actress in a Leading Role
Olaf Lubaszenko — Sekal Has to Die	Iva Janžurová — In the Rye
Best Actor in a Supporting Role	Best Actress in a Supporting Role
Miroslav Donutil — Traps	Agnieszka Siteková — Sekal Has to Die
Best Screenplay	Best Editing
Jiří Křižan — Sekal Has to Die	Jiří Brožek — Sekal Has to Die
Design	Best Cinematography
Jiří Sternwald — Sekal Has to Die	Martin Štrba — Sekal Has to Die
Music	Sound
Michał Lorenc — Sekal Has to Die	Radim Hladík ml. — Sekal Has to Die
Unique Contribution to Czech Film
Jiří Krejčík

=== Non-statutory Awards ===
Best Foreign Film	Most Popular Film
Saving Private Ryan	Titanic
Worst Film	Cinema Readers' Award
Rapid Eye Movement	Saving Private Ryan
Film Critics' Award	Best Film Poster
Sekal Has to Die	Michal Cihlář — The Bed
