= Daniel J. Snyder =

American television and film producer

- Born: United States
- Occupations: Producer, director, writer

Daniel J. Snyder is an American television and film producer whose feature-length documentary, Dreams on Spec, is the first documentary ever to look at Hollywood from the perspective of the much-maligned screenwriter.

Snyder has served as show runner, director, producer, or writer on more than fifty non-fiction television programs, including the AMC documentary series “Movies that Shook the World,” narrated by Jeff Goldblum, and “Brilliant but Cancelled” a documentary about forgotten television gems for digital arts cable channel Trio. Prior to working in documentaries, Snyder was a producer for the CNN news magazine program, NewsStand, and the Los Angeles Correspondent for Marketplace, public radio's business program.

Daniel Snyder's education in media and filmmaking began during high school when he landed a job at Video Archives, the now-famous video store in Manhattan Beach, California, where he worked as a video clerk alongside future filmmakers Quentin Tarantino and Roger Avary.
