= Michael Kanfer =

American visual effects artist

- Other name: Michael D. Kanfer
- Occupation: Visual effects artist
- Years active: 1994-2006

Michael Kanfer is an American visual effects artist who is best known for his work on Titanic and Apollo 13.

== Oscars ==
Both of these are in the category of Best Visual Effects

- 68th Academy Awards-Nominated for Apollo 13. Nomination shared with Leslie Ekker, Robert Legato and Matt Sweeney. Lost to Babe.
- 70th Academy Awards-Titanic. Shared with Thomas L. Fisher, Mark Lasoff and Robert Legato. Won.

== Selected filmography ==
- Apollo 13 (1995)
- Titanic (1997)
- What Dreams May Come (1998)
- Sky Captain and the World of Tomorrow (2004)
