= Video Archives =

Video rental store

- Industry: Video rentals, retail
- Founder: Lance Lawson; Richard Humbert
- Fate: Closed
- Headquarters: Manhattan Beach, California, United States
- Products: VHS tape rental, Beta rental

Video Archives was a video rental store initially located in Manhattan Beach, California, and before moving to Hermosa Beach, California. It was owned and managed by Lance Lawson and Rick Humbert.

== History ==
Filmmakers Quentin Tarantino, Roger Avary, and Daniel Snyder worked at Video Archives before becoming successful in the film industry. The store was also frequented by screenwriters Josh Olson, Jeff Maguire, John Langley, and Danny Strong.

Video Archives closed in 1995, after which Tarantino purchased its video inventory and rebuilt the store in his home.

In a 1994 interview with Rolling Stone, Tarantino called it "the best video store in the Los Angeles area," saying, "Video Archives is like LA.’s answer to the Cahiers du Cinéma." In 1992, Roger Avary described it as "less a video store than a film school [...] we'd have these intense, eight-hour-long arguments about cinema. Customers would walk in, and they'd get into it. It became this big clubhouse of filmmaking—and probably the best filmmaking experience anyone could ever get."

Video Archives is also the namesake of the Video Archives Cinema Club, the 20-seat micro-cinema at the Tarantino-owned Vista Theatre.

== Podcast ==
On July 19, 2022, Tarantino and Avary launched a podcast named after Video Archives called The Video Archives Podcast with Quentin Tarantino & Roger Avary. The podcast revisits movies from the store and discusses the films. They are joined by producer Gala Avary and guests such as Eli Roth and former employees of Video Archives.

== See also ==
- Cinephilia
- Postmodernist film
