= Thomas L. Fisher =

Visual Effects Artist

- Born: October 16, 1941 (age 84)
- Occupation: Visual effects artist
- Years active: 1974-present
- Spouse: Paula Fisher
- Children: Scott Fisher

Thomas L. Fisher is a visual effects artist who is most known for being part of the team to the film Titanic.

He has worked on over 35 films since 1974.

== Oscars ==
Both of these are in the category of Best Visual Effects

- 67th Academy Awards-Nominated for True Lies. Nomination shared with John Bruno, Patrick McClung and Jacques Stroweis. Lost to Forrest Gump.
- 70th Academy Awards-Titanic. Shared with Michael Kanfer, Mark Lasoff and Robert Legato. Won.
