= Simon Thompson (make-up artist) =

- Occupation: makeup artist
- Years active: 1972-2005

Simon Thompson is an make-up artist who was nominated at the 70th Academy Awards for his work on the film Titanic in the category of Best Makeup. He shared his nomination with Greg Cannom and Tina Earnshaw.

== Selected filmography ==
- The French Lieutenant's Woman (1981)
- Emma (1996)
- Titanic (1997)
