= Tina Earnshaw =

British make-up designer

- Born: London, England
- Other name: Tina M. Earnshaw
- Occupation: Makeup artist
- Years active: 1970–2026
- Spouse: Robin Earnshaw
- Children: 2

Tina Earnshaw was an Oscar- and BAFTA-nominated British make-up designer and the founder of Tina Earnshaw Cosmetics. She designed the make up looks on some of the world's most successful films, including Titanic, for which she was nominated for an Academy Award, alongside Greg Cannom and Simon Thompson.

Born in London, she began her career at the BBC working as a professional makeup artist.

Initially working on commercials and for brands such as L'Oréal, Dior, and Chanel, she became known for the flawless beauty looks she created and for her methods of research that informed her designs.

In 1995, she began a lasting partnership with Merchant Ivory and relocated to Paris to work on her first feature film. By 1997, she was on the set of James Cameron's Titanic, for which she received her first Oscar nomination. Since then she has designed the makeup looks for films such as Shakespeare in Love, The Italian Job, The Talented Mr. Ripley, Spider-Man 2 and 3, Prometheus, The Martian, Exodus: Gods and Kings, Mamma Mia 2 and Ridley Scott's All the Money in the World’.

Her work has included designs for a number of internationally recognized actors and public figures, including Penélope Cruz, Gwyneth Paltrow, Cate Blanchett, Charlize Theron, Brad Pitt, Matt Damon, and Jude Law. She has also served as an international creative ambassador.

She is married to Robin Earnshaw and they have two children: Damon and Polly.

== Selected filmography ==
- 2018 Mamma Mia! Here We Go Again (make-up and hair designer) (completed)
- 2017 All the Money in the World (make-up and hair designer) (completed)
- 2016/II The Promise (makeup department head)
- 2015 The Martian (make up and hair designer)
- 2014 Exodus: Gods and Kings (makeup designer)
- 2014 Before I Go to Sleep (makeup department head)
- 2014 Turks & Caicos (TV Movie) (makeup department head)
- 2013 The Counsellor (makeup designer)
- 2012/I Prometheus (makeup designer)
- 2011 Page Eight (TV Movie) (makeup designer)
- 2011 Your Highness (makeup designer)
- 2008 Marley & Me (makeup artist: Owen Wilson)
- 2008 Mamma Mia! (makeup designer)
- 2008/ The Deal (makeup artist: Ms. Ryan)
- 2007 Spider-Man 3 (makeup artist: Mr. Maguire)
- 2005 Dark Water (makeup artist: Ms. Connelly)
- 2004 Spider-Man 2 (makeup artist: Mr. Maguire)
- 2003 The Italian Job (chief makeup artist)
- 2001 Domestic Disturbance (key makeup artist - as Tina M. Earnshaw)
- 2001 Conspiracy (TV Movie) (makeup supervisor)
- 2001 The Mists of Avalon (TV Mini-Series) (makeup artist - 2 episodes) - Episode #1.2 (2001) ... (makeup artist: Ms. Huston) - Episode #1.1 (2001) ... (makeup artist: Ms. Huston)
- 2000 Bounce (makeup artist: Gwyneth Paltrow)
- 2000 Duets (key makeup artist)
- 1999 The Talented Mr. Ripley (supervising makeup artist)
- 1998 Shakespeare in Love (makeup designer: Gwyneth Paltrow)
- 1998 Ever After: A Cinderella Story (key makeup artist) / (makeup artist: Ms. Huston)
- 1998 Sliding Doors (key makeup designer)
- 1997 Titanic (key makeup artist)
- 1997 The Designated Mourner (chief makeup artist)
- 1996 Surviving Picasso (chief makeup artist)
- 1996 Emma (chief makeup designer)
- 1995 Othello (chief makeup artist)
- 1995 Feast of July (key makeup artist)
- 1995 Jefferson in Paris (key makeup artist)
- 1993 The Line, the Cross & the Curve (Short) (makeup artist)
- 1972 War & Peace (TV Mini-Series) (makeup artist - 1 episode) - Part One: Name Day (1972) ... (makeup artist)
- 1971 The Two Ronnies (TV Series) (makeup artist - 8 episodes) - Episode #1.8 (1971) ... (makeup artist) - Episode #1.7 (1971) ... (makeup artist) - Episode #1.6 (1971) ... (makeup artist) - Episode #1.5 (1971) ... (makeup artist) - Episode #1.4 (1971) ... (makeup artist) Show all 8 episodes
- 1970 Sentimental Education (TV Mini-Series) (makeup artist - 3 episodes) - The Philanderer (1970) ... (makeup artist) - The Red Rose and the White (1970) ... (makeup artist) - A Start to Loving (1970) ... (makeup artist)
- 1970 Julie Felix (TV Series) (makeup artist - 6 episodes) - Episode #1.6 (1970) ... (makeup artist) - Episode #1.5 (1970) ... (makeup artist) - Episode #1.4 (1970) ... (makeup artist) - Episode #1.3 (1970) ... (makeup artist) - Episode #1.2 (1970) ... (makeup artist) Show all 6 episodes
