= Robert Legato =

Visual effects supervisor

Robert Legato (born 1956) is an American visual effects supervisor, second unit director, and second unit director of photography.

Raised in Asbury Park, New Jersey, Legato graduated from Ocean Township High School.

== Career ==
He directed the 2016 film Eloise.

He has been nominated for five Academy Awards and has won three. His first win was for his visual effects work on Titanic, his second was for his work on Hugo and his third for The Jungle Book. In 1996, he won the BAFTA award for Best Achievement in Special Effects for Apollo 13, for which he also garnered his first Academy Award nomination. In 2020, he received his fifth Academy Award nomination for Best Visual Effects for The Lion King.

Prior to his work in film, he was a Visual Effects Supervisor for Star Trek: The Next Generation from 1987 to 1992, and Star Trek: Deep Space Nine in 1993. His work on the Star Trek franchise earned him three Emmy nominations and two wins, as well as an in-front-of-the-camera appearance on Reading Rainbow for an episode devoted to a behind-the-scenes look at TNG.

Legato is a member of the Directors Guild of America (DGA), American Society of Cinematographers (ASC) and the Visual Effects Society (VES).

== Filmography ==
=== Film ===
Year	Title	Visual effects supervisor	Second unit director	Second unit director of photography	Director
1994	Interview with the Vampire	Yes	Yes	Yes	Neil Jordan
1995	Apollo 13	Yes	No	No	Ron Howard
1997	Titanic	Yes	No	No	James Cameron
2000	What Lies Beneath	Yes	No	No	Robert Zemeckis
2000	Cast Away	visual effects consultant	No	No	Robert Zemeckis
2001	Harry Potter and the Philosopher's Stone	Yes	Yes	Yes	Chris Columbus
2003	Bad Boys II	Yes	No	No	Michael Bay
2004	The Aviator	Yes	Yes	Yes	Martin Scorsese
2005	Bewitched	No	Yes	No	Nora Ephron
2006	The Departed	Yes	Yes	Yes	Martin Scorsese
2006	The Good Shepherd	Yes	Yes	Yes	Robert De Niro
2007	The Nanny Diaries	Yes	No	No	Shari Springer Berman and Robert Pulcini
2008	Shine a Light	visual effects consultant	No	No	Martin Scorsese
2008	Standard Operating Procedure	Yes	No	No	Errol Morris
2009	Avatar	Yes	No	No	James Cameron
2010	Shutter Island	Yes	Yes	Yes	Martin Scorsese
2010	A Nightmare on Elm Street	No	Yes	No	Samuel Bayer
2011	Hugo	Yes	Yes	Yes	Martin Scorsese
2011	George Harrison: Living in the Material World	Yes	No	No	Martin Scorsese
2013	The Wolf of Wall Street	Yes	Yes	Yes	Martin Scorsese
2016	The Jungle Book	Yes	Yes	Yes	Jon Favreau
2019	The Lion King	Yes	Yes	Yes	Jon Favreau
2020	Borat: Subsequent Moviefilm	No	Maryland unit	No	Jason Woliner
2022	Ambulance	Yes	No	No	Michael Bay
2022	Emancipation	Yes	Yes	No	Antoine Fuqua
2023	Air	No	Yes	No	Ben Affleck
2023	The Equalizer 3	No	Yes	No	Antoine Fuqua
2024	Horizon: An American Saga	Yes	Yes	Yes	Kevin Costner

=== Television ===
Year	Title	Visual effects supervisor	Visual effects coordinator	Visual effects artist
1986	The Twilight Zone			1 Episode
1987–1992	Star Trek: The Next Generation	46 Episodes	17 Episodes	
1993	Star Trek: Deep Space Nine	18 Episodes		1 Episode
