= List of accolades received by Inception =

Inception accolades
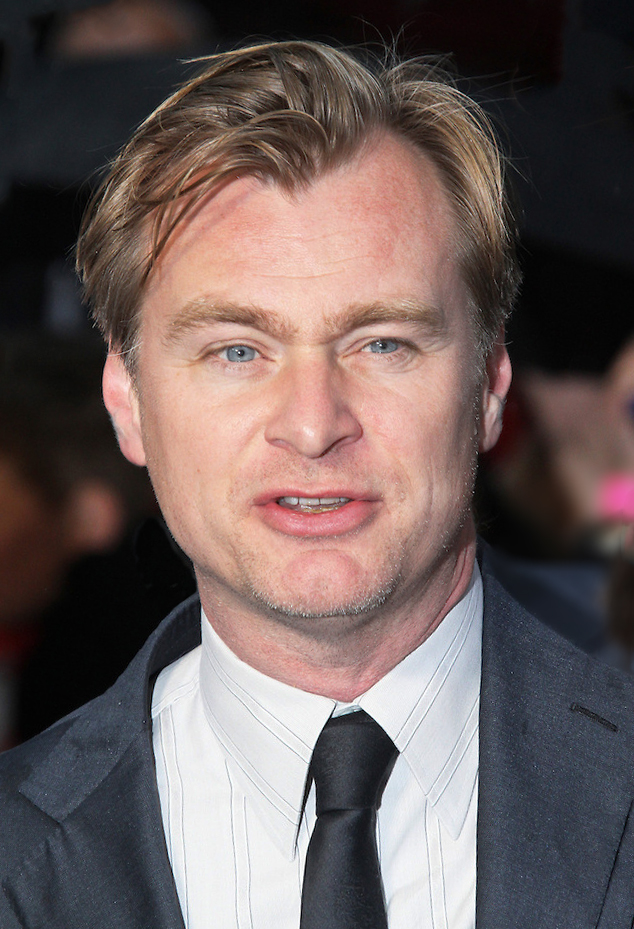
- Christopher Nolan garnered several awards and nominations for his direction and writing.
Accolades
| Award | Wins | Nominations |
| Academy Awards | 4 | 8 |
| AFCA Film Awards | 0 | 1 |
| African-American Film Critics Association Awards | 2 | 2 |
| Alliance of Women Film Journalists EDA Awards | 1 | 9 |
| Amanda Awards | 0 | 1 |
| American Cinema Editors Eddie Awards | 0 | 1 |
| American Film Institute Awards | 1 | 1 |
| American Society of Cinematographers Awards | 1 | 1 |
| Art Directors Guild Awards | 1 | 1 |
| Artios Awards | 0 | 1 |
| Austin Film Critics Association Awards | 1 | 1 |
| Bodil Awards | 0 | 1 |
| Boston Society of Film Critics Awards | 1 | 1 |
| British Academy Film Awards | 3 | 9 |
| British Society of Cinematographers Awards | 0 | 1 |
| Camerimage Awards | 0 | 1 |
| César Awards | 0 | 1 |
| Chicago Film Critics Association Awards | 2 | 5 |
| Cinema Audio Society Awards | 0 | 1 |
| Costume Designers Guild Awards | 0 | 1 |
| Crime Thriller Awards | 1 | 1 |
| Critics' Choice Movie Awards | 6 | 10 |
| Czech Lion Awards | 1 | 1 |
| Dallas–Fort Worth Film Critics Association Awards | 4 | 4 |
| David di Donatello Awards | 0 | 1 |
| Detroit Film Critics Society Awards | 0 | 2 |
| Directors Guild of America Awards | 0 | 1 |
| Dublin Film Critics' Circle Awards | 2 | 2 |
| Empire Awards | 1 | 4 |
| Film Critics Circle of Australia Awards | 0 | 1 |
| Florida Film Critics Circle Awards | 4 | 4 |
| Gaudí Awards | 0 | 1 |
| Golden Globe Awards | 0 | 4 |
| Golden Reel Awards | 2 | 3 |
| Golden Trailer Awards | 1 | 5 |
| Grammy Awards | 0 | 1 |
| Grande Prêmio do Cinema Brasileiro | 0 | 1 |
| Hollywood Film Awards | 3 | 3 |
| Hollywood Music in Media Awards | 1 | 1 |
| Hollywood Post Alliance Awards | 1 | 2 |
| Houston Film Critics Society Awards | 2 | 5 |
| Huabiao Film Awards | 0 | 1 |
| Hugo Awards | 1 | 1 |
| International Cinephile Society Awards | 2 | 4 |
| International Film Music Critics Association Awards | 0 | 2 |
| Irish Film & Television Awards | 0 | 3 |
| Japan Academy Film Prize | 0 | 1 |
| Kansas City Film Critics Circle Awards | 3 | 3 |
| Kinema Junpo Awards | 2 | 2 |
| London Film Critics' Circle Awards | 0 | 3 |
| Los Angeles Film Critics Association Awards | 1 | 1 |
| MTV Movie Awards | 1 | 6 |
| Nastro d'Argento | 0 | 1 |
| National Board of Review Awards | 1 | 1 |
| Nebula Awards | 1 | 1 |
| New York Film Critics Online Awards | 1 | 1 |
| Online Film Critics Society Awards | 2 | 5 |
| People's Choice Awards | 0 | 3 |
| Producers Guild of America Awards | 0 | 1 |
| Rembrandt Awards | 1 | 1 |
| Robert Awards | 1 | 1 |
| Rondo Hatton Classic Horror Awards | 0 | 1 |
| Russian National Movie Awards | 3 | 4 |
| San Diego Film Critics Society Awards | 1 | 6 |
| Satellite Awards | 3 | 11 |
| Saturn Awards | 5 | 9 |
| Scream Awards | 6 | 15 |
| Screen Actors Guild Awards | 1 | 1 |
| St. Louis Film Critics Association Awards | 6 | 7 |
| Taurus World Stunt Awards | 2 | 4 |
| Teen Choice Awards | 0 | 1 |
| Toronto Film Critics Association Awards | 1 | 1 |
| Turkish Film Critics Association Awards | 1 | 1 |
| Vancouver Film Critics Circle Awards | 0 | 1 |
| Visual Effects Society Awards | 4 | 4 |
| Washington D.C. Area Film Critics Association Awards | 4 | 7 |
| World Soundtrack Awards | 1 | 2 |
| Writers Guild of America Awards | 1 | 1 |

Totals (Note: Certain award groups do not simply award one winner. They acknowledge several different recipients, have runners-up, and have third place. Since this is a specific recognition and is different from losing an award, runner-up mentions are considered wins in this award tally. For simplification and to avoid errors, each award in this list has been presumed to have had a prior nomination.)
- Wins: 102
- Nominations: 223

Inception is a 2010 science fiction action film written and directed by Christopher Nolan, who also produced it with Emma Thomas, his wife, under their label Syncopy. It stars Leonardo DiCaprio as a professional thief who steals information by infiltrating the dreams of his victims and is promised to have his criminal status cleared as payment for the implantation of an idea into a target's subconscious. The ensemble cast includes Ken Watanabe, Joseph Gordon-Levitt, Marion Cotillard, Elliot Page, (Note: Credited as Ellen Page; Page came out as transgender and changed his name in 2020.) Tom Hardy, Cillian Murphy, Tom Berenger, Dileep Rao, and Michael Caine.

Inception premiered at the Odeon Leicester Square in London on July 8, 2010. It was released in both conventional and IMAX theatres (in the United States and United Kingdom) by Warner Bros. Pictures on July 16. Releases in additional territories followed throughout July and August. Produced on a budget of $160 million, the film grossed $828 million worldwide, concluding its original theatrical run as the fourth-highest-grossing film of 2010. Subsequent re-releases have increased its total gross to $839 million. Inception received positive reviews from critics, who praised the story, visual effects, editing, musical score and performances (particularly DiCaprio's). (Note: Attributed to multiple sources:) On the review aggregator website Rotten Tomatoes, the film holds an approval rating of 87% based on 364 reviews. It is considered one of the best films of 2010 and of the decade, having appeared on several critic lists for both categories.

Inception garnered awards and nominations in various categories, with particular recognition for its cinematography, score, visual and sound effects, and editing as well as Nolan's screenplay and direction. At the 83rd Academy Awards, the film received eight nominations, winning Best Cinematography, Best Sound Editing, Best Sound Mixing and Best Visual Effects. It tied with The King's Speech (which won Best Picture) for most wins at the ceremony. The film earned nine nominations at the 64th British Academy Film Awards, where it won Best Production Design, Best Sound and Best Special Visual Effects. It received a further nine nominations at the 37th Saturn Awards, winning five awards, and 10 nominations at the 16th Critics' Choice Awards, winning six awards. In addition, both the National Board of Review and the American Film Institute named Inception one of the Top 10 Films of 2010.

== Accolades ==
Accolades received by Inception
| Award | Date of ceremony | Category | Recipient(s) | Result | Ref. |
|---|---|---|---|---|---|
| Academy Awards | February 27, 2011 | Best Picture | Emma Thomas and Christopher Nolan | Nominated | |
| Academy Awards | February 27, 2011 | Best Original Screenplay | Christopher Nolan | Nominated | |
| Academy Awards | February 27, 2011 | Best Art Direction | Guy Hendrix Dyas, Larry Dias and Doug Mowat | Nominated | |
| Academy Awards | February 27, 2011 | Best Cinematography | Wally Pfister | Won | |
| Academy Awards | February 27, 2011 | Best Original Score | Hans Zimmer | Nominated | |
| Academy Awards | February 27, 2011 | Best Sound Editing | Richard King | Won | |
| Academy Awards | February 27, 2011 | Best Sound Mixing | Lora Hirschberg, Gary A. Rizzo and Ed Novick | Won | |
| Academy Awards | February 27, 2011 | Best Visual Effects | Paul Franklin, Chris Corbould, Andrew Lockley and Peter Bebb | Won | |
| AFCA Film Awards | February 21, 2011 | Best Overseas Film | Inception | Nominated | |
| African-American Film Critics Association Awards | December 13, 2010 | Top 10 Films | Inception | 3rd Place | |
| African-American Film Critics Association Awards | December 13, 2010 | Best Director | Christopher Nolan | Won | |
| Alliance of Women Film Journalists EDA Awards | January 10, 2011 | Best Film | Inception | Nominated | |
| Alliance of Women Film Journalists EDA Awards | January 10, 2011 | Best Director | Christopher Nolan | Nominated | |
| Alliance of Women Film Journalists EDA Awards | January 10, 2011 | Best Original Screenplay | Christopher Nolan | Nominated | |
| Alliance of Women Film Journalists EDA Awards | January 10, 2011 | Best Editing | Lee Smith | Won (Note: Tied with Andrew Weisblum for Black Swan) | |
| Alliance of Women Film Journalists EDA Awards | January 10, 2011 | Best Cinematography | Wally Pfister | Nominated | |
| Alliance of Women Film Journalists EDA Awards | January 10, 2011 | Best Film Music or Score | Hans Zimmer | Nominated | |
| Alliance of Women Film Journalists EDA Awards | January 10, 2011 | Most Beautiful Film | Inception | Nominated | |
| Alliance of Women Film Journalists EDA Awards | January 10, 2011 | Movie You Wanted to Love But Just Couldn't | Inception | Nominated | |
| Alliance of Women Film Journalists EDA Awards | January 10, 2011 | Unforgettable Moment Award | Inception (for "Paris folds in on itself") | Nominated | |
| Amanda Awards | August 21, 2011 | Best Foreign Feature Film | Inception | Nominated | |
| American Cinema Editors Eddie Awards | February 14, 2010 | Best Edited Feature Film – Dramatic | Lee Smith | Nominated | |
| American Film Institute Awards | December 12, 2010 | Top 10 Films of the Year | Inception | Won (Note: This award does not have a single winner, but recognizes multiple films.) | |
| American Society of Cinematographers Awards | February 13, 2011 | Outstanding Achievement in Cinematography in Theatrical Releases | Wally Pfister | Won | |
| Art Directors Guild Awards | February 5, 2011 | Excellence in Production Design for a Fantasy Film | Guy Hendrix Dyas | Won | |
| Artios Awards | September 27, 2011 | Big Budget Feature – Drama | John Papsidera | Nominated | |
| Austin Film Critics Association Awards | December 22, 2010 | Top 10 Films | Inception | 3rd Place | |
| Bodil Awards | February 20, 2011 | Best American Film | Inception | Nominated | |
| Boston Society of Film Critics Awards | December 12, 2010 | Best Editing | Lee Smith | Runner-up | |
| British Academy Film Awards | February 13, 2011 | Best Film | Emma Thomas and Christopher Nolan | Nominated | |
| British Academy Film Awards | February 13, 2011 | Best Director | Christopher Nolan | Nominated | |
| British Academy Film Awards | February 13, 2011 | Best Original Screenplay | Christopher Nolan | Nominated | |
| British Academy Film Awards | February 13, 2011 | Best Cinematography | Wally Pfister | Nominated | |
| British Academy Film Awards | February 13, 2011 | Best Editing | Lee Smith | Nominated | |
| British Academy Film Awards | February 13, 2011 | Best Original Music | Hans Zimmer | Nominated | |
| British Academy Film Awards | February 13, 2011 | Best Production Design | Guy Hendrix Dyas, Larry Dias and Doug Mowat | Won | |
| British Academy Film Awards | February 13, 2011 | Best Sound | Richard King, Lora Hirschberg, Gary A. Rizzo and Ed Novick | Won | |
| British Academy Film Awards | February 13, 2011 | Best Special Visual Effects | Chris Corbould, Paul Franklin, Andrew Lockley and Peter Bebb | Won | |
| British Society of Cinematographers Awards | February 16, 2010 | Best Cinematography in a Theatrical Feature Film | Wally Pfister | Nominated | |
| Camerimage Awards | December 4, 2010 | Golden Frog | Wally Pfister | Nominated | |
| César Awards | February 25, 2011 | Best Foreign Film | Inception | Nominated | |
| Chicago Film Critics Association Awards | December 20, 2010 | Best Film | Inception | Nominated | |
| Chicago Film Critics Association Awards | December 20, 2010 | Best Director | Christopher Nolan | Nominated | |
| Chicago Film Critics Association Awards | December 20, 2010 | Best Original Screenplay | Christopher Nolan | Won | |
| Chicago Film Critics Association Awards | December 20, 2010 | Best Cinematography | Wally Pfister | Won | |
| Chicago Film Critics Association Awards | December 20, 2010 | Best Original Score | Hans Zimmer | Nominated | |
| Cinema Audio Society Awards | February 19, 2011 | Outstanding Achievement in Sound Mixing for a Motion Picture | Ed Novick, Lora Hirschberg, and Gary A. Rizzo | Nominated | |
| Costume Designers Guild Awards | February 22, 2011 | Excellence in Contemporary Film | Jeffrey Kurland | Nominated | |
| Crime Thriller Awards | October 8, 2010 | Film of the Year | Inception | Won | |
| Critics' Choice Movie Awards | January 14, 2011 | Best Picture | Inception | Nominated | |
| Critics' Choice Movie Awards | January 14, 2011 | Best Director | Christopher Nolan | Nominated | |
| Critics' Choice Movie Awards | January 14, 2011 | Best Original Screenplay | Christopher Nolan | Nominated | |
| Critics' Choice Movie Awards | January 14, 2011 | Best Action Movie | Inception | Won | |
| Critics' Choice Movie Awards | January 14, 2011 | Best Cinematography | Wally Pfister | Won | |
| Critics' Choice Movie Awards | January 14, 2011 | Best Art Direction | Guy Hendrix Dyas, Larry Dias, and Doug Mowat | Won | |
| Critics' Choice Movie Awards | January 14, 2011 | Best Editing | Lee Smith | Won | |
| Critics' Choice Movie Awards | January 14, 2011 | Best Visual Effects | Inception | Won | |
| Critics' Choice Movie Awards | January 14, 2011 | Best Score | Hans Zimmer | Nominated | |
| Critics' Choice Movie Awards | January 14, 2011 | Best Sound | Inception | Won | |
| Czech Lion Awards | March 5, 2011 | Best Foreign Film | Inception | Won | |
| Dallas–Fort Worth Film Critics Association Awards | December 17, 2010 | Top 10 Films | Inception | 6th Place | |
| Dallas–Fort Worth Film Critics Association Awards | December 17, 2010 | Best Director | Christopher Nolan | 4th Place | |
| Dallas–Fort Worth Film Critics Association Awards | December 17, 2010 | Best Screenplay | Christopher Nolan | Runner-up | |
| Dallas–Fort Worth Film Critics Association Awards | December 17, 2010 | Best Cinematography | Wally Pfister | Runner-up (Note: Tied with Roger Deakins for True Grit) | |
| David di Donatello Awards | May 6, 2011 | Best Foreign Film | Inception | Nominated | |
| Detroit Film Critics Society Awards | December 11, 2010 | Best Film | Inception | Nominated | |
| Detroit Film Critics Society Awards | December 11, 2010 | Best Director | Christopher Nolan | Nominated | |
| Directors Guild of America Awards | January 29, 2011 | Outstanding Directorial Achievement in Feature Film | Christopher Nolan | Nominated | |
| Dublin Film Critics' Circle Awards | December 17, 2010 | Best Film | Inception | 6th Place | |
| Dublin Film Critics' Circle Awards | December 17, 2010 | Best Director | Christopher Nolan | 4th Place | |
| Empire Awards | March 27, 2011 | Best Film | Inception | Won | |
| Empire Awards | March 27, 2011 | Best Director | Christopher Nolan | Nominated | |
| Empire Awards | March 27, 2011 | Best Actor | Leonardo DiCaprio | Nominated | |
| Empire Awards | March 27, 2011 | Best Sci-Fi/Fantasy | Inception | Nominated | |
| Film Critics Circle of Australia Awards | March 13, 2011 | Best Foreign Film – English Language | Inception | Nominated | |
| Florida Film Critics Circle Awards | December 20, 2010 | Best Original Screenplay | Christopher Nolan | Won | |
| Florida Film Critics Circle Awards | December 20, 2010 | Best Art Direction/Production Design | Brad Ricker and Guy Hendrix Dyas | Won | |
| Florida Film Critics Circle Awards | December 20, 2010 | Best Cinematography | Wally Pfister | Won | |
| Florida Film Critics Circle Awards | December 20, 2010 | Best Visual Effects | Inception | Won | |
| Gaudí Awards | January 17, 2011 | Best European Film | Inception | Nominated | |
| Golden Globe Awards | January 16, 2011 | Best Motion Picture - Drama | Inception | Nominated | |
| Golden Globe Awards | January 16, 2011 | Best Director | Christopher Nolan | Nominated | |
| Golden Globe Awards | January 16, 2011 | Best Screenplay | Christopher Nolan | Nominated | |
| Golden Globe Awards | January 16, 2011 | Best Original Score | Hans Zimmer | Nominated | |
| Golden Reel Awards | February 21, 2011 | Best Sound Editing in Feature Film – Dialogue & ADR | Richard King, Hugo Weng, R.J and Kizer | Nominated | |
| Golden Reel Awards | February 21, 2011 | Best Sound Editing – Music in a Feature Film | Alex Gibson and Ryan Rubin | Won | |
| Golden Reel Awards | February 21, 2011 | Best Sound Editing in Feature Film – Sound Effects & Foley | Richard King, Christopher Flick, John Roesch, Alyson Dee Moore, Michael Babcock, Paul Berolzheimer, Michael W. Mitchell, Bryan Watkins and Bruce Tanis | Won | |
| Golden Trailer Awards | June 29, 2011 | Best Action | Warner Bros. and BLT:AV (for "Control") | Nominated | |
| Golden Trailer Awards | June 29, 2011 | Best Drama Poster | Warner Bros. and Ignition (for "Bus Shelter (Paris)") | Nominated | |
| Golden Trailer Awards | June 29, 2011 | Best Thriller Poster | Warner Bros. and Ignition (for "Bus Shelter Folding City") | Nominated | |
| Golden Trailer Awards | June 29, 2011 | Most Original Poster | Warner Bros. and Ignition (for "Mosaic Character" Posters) | Nominated | |
| Golden Trailer Awards | June 29, 2011 | Best Standee for a Feature Film | Warner Bros. and Ignition (for "In Theatre Totems") | Won | |
| Grammy Awards | February 13, 2011 | Best Score Soundtrack Album for a Motion Picture, Television or Other Visual Media | Hans Zimmer | Nominated (Note: Zimmer received another nomination for his work on Sherlock Holmes.) | |
| Grande Prêmio do Cinema Brasileiro | May 31, 2011 | Best Foreign Film | Inception | Nominated | |
| Hollywood Film Awards | October 26, 2010 | Movie Award | Inception | Won | |
| Hollywood Film Awards | October 26, 2010 | Cinematography Award | Wally Pfister | Won | |
| Hollywood Film Awards | October 26, 2010 | Film Composer Award | Hans Zimmer | Won | |
| Hollywood Music in Media Awards | November 18, 2010 | Best Score in a Feature Film | Hans Zimmer | Won | |
| Hollywood Post Alliance Awards | November 11, 2010 | Outstanding Sound – Feature Film | Lora Hirschberg, Gary A. Rizzo and Richard King | Nominated | |
| Hollywood Post Alliance Awards | November 11, 2010 | Outstanding Editing – Feature Film | Lee Smith | Won | |
| Houston Film Critics Society Awards | December 18, 2010 | Best Picture | Inception | Nominated | |
| Houston Film Critics Society Awards | December 18, 2010 | Best Director | Christopher Nolan | Nominated | |
| Houston Film Critics Society Awards | December 18, 2010 | Best Screenplay | Christopher Nolan | Nominated | |
| Houston Film Critics Society Awards | December 18, 2010 | Best Cinematography | Wally Pfister | Won | |
| Houston Film Critics Society Awards | December 18, 2010 | Best Original Score | Hans Zimmer | Won | |
| Huabiao Film Awards | August 28, 2011 | Outstanding Translated Foreign Fim | Inception | Nominated | |
| Hugo Awards | August 20, 2011 | Best Dramatic Presentation, Long Form | Inception | Won | |
| International Cinephile Society Awards | February 20, 2011 | Best Picture | Inception | 10th Place | |
| International Cinephile Society Awards | February 20, 2011 | Best Editing | Lee Smith | Nominated | |
| International Cinephile Society Awards | February 20, 2011 | Best Production Design | Guy Hendrix Dyas | Runner-up | |
| International Cinephile Society Awards | February 20, 2011 | Best Original Score | Hans Zimmer | Nominated | |
| International Film Music Critics Association Awards | February 24, 2011 | Film Score of the Year | Hans Zimmer | Nominated | |
| International Film Music Critics Association Awards | February 24, 2011 | Best Original Score for an Action/Adventure/Thriller Film | Hans Zimmer | Nominated | |
| Irish Film & Television Awards | February 12, 2011 | Best Actor in a Supporting Role – Film | Cillian Murphy | Nominated | |
| Irish Film & Television Awards | February 12, 2011 | International Film | Inception | Nominated | |
| Irish Film & Television Awards | February 12, 2011 | International Actor | Leonardo DiCaprio | Nominated | |
| Kansas City Film Critics Circle Awards | January 2, 2011 | Robert Altman Award for Best Director | Christopher Nolan | Won | |
| Kansas City Film Critics Circle Awards | January 2, 2011 | Best Original Screenplay | Christopher Nolan | Won | |
| Kansas City Film Critics Circle Awards | January 2, 2011 | Vince Koehler Award for Best Science Fiction, Fantasy or Horror Film | Inception | Won | |
| Japan Academy Film Prize | February 18, 2011 | Outstanding Foreign Language Film | Inception | Nominated | |
| Kinema Junpo Awards | February 20, 2011 | Top Ten Best Foreign Films | Inception | 10th Place | |
| Kinema Junpo Awards | February 20, 2011 | Reader's Choice Top Ten Best Foreign Films | Inception | 7th Place | |
| London Film Critics' Circle Awards | February 11, 2011 | Director of the Year | Christopher Nolan | Nominated | |
| London Film Critics' Circle Awards | February 11, 2011 | British Director of the Year | Christopher Nolan | Nominated | |
| London Film Critics' Circle Awards | February 11, 2011 | British Actor in a Supporting Role | Tom Hardy | Nominated | |
| Los Angeles Film Critics Association Awards | December 12, 2010 | Best Production Design | Guy Hendrix Dyas | Won | |
| MTV Movie Awards | June 5, 2011 | Best Movie | Inception | Nominated | |
| MTV Movie Awards | June 5, 2011 | Best Scared-As-S**t Performance | Elliot Page | Won | |
| MTV Movie Awards | June 5, 2011 | Best Kiss | Joseph Gordon-Levitt and Elliot Page | Nominated | |
| MTV Movie Awards | June 5, 2011 | Best Fight | Joseph Gordon-Levitt vs. Hallway Attacker | Nominated | |
| MTV Movie Awards | June 5, 2011 | Best Jaw-Dropping Moment | Leonardo DiCaprio and Elliot Page | Nominated | |
| MTV Movie Awards | June 5, 2011 | Best Line from a Movie | Tom Hardy (for "You mustn't be afraid to dream a little bigger darling.") | Nominated | |
| Nastro d'Argento | June 25, 2011 | Best Non-European Film | Inception | Nominated | |
| National Board of Review Awards | December 2, 2010 | Top 10 Films | Inception | Won | |
| Nebula Awards | May 21, 2011 | Ray Bradbury Award | Christopher Nolan | Won | |
| New York Film Critics Online Awards | December 12, 2010 | Top 10 Films of the Year | Inception | Won | |
| Online Film Critics Society Awards | January 3, 2011 | Best Picture | Inception | Nominated | |
| Online Film Critics Society Awards | January 3, 2011 | Best Director | Christopher Nolan | Nominated | |
| Online Film Critics Society Awards | January 3, 2011 | Best Original Screenplay | Christopher Nolan | Won | |
| Online Film Critics Society Awards | January 3, 2011 | Best Cinematography | Wally Pfister | Nominated | |
| Online Film Critics Society Awards | January 3, 2011 | Best Editing | Lee Smith | Won | |
| People's Choice Awards | January 5, 2011 | Favorite Movie | Inception | Nominated | |
| People's Choice Awards | January 5, 2011 | Favorite Drama Movie | Inception | Nominated | |
| People's Choice Awards | January 5, 2011 | Favorite On-Screen Team | Leonardo DiCaprio, Joseph Gordon-Levitt, Elliot Page, Tom Hardy and Dileep Rao | Nominated | |
| Producers Guild of America Awards | January 22, 2011 | Best Theatrical Motion Picture | Christopher Nolan and Emma Thomas | Nominated | |
| Rembrandt Awards | March 28, 2011 | Best Foreign Film | Inception | Won | |
| Robert Awards | February 6, 2011 | Best American Film | Inception | Won | |
| Rondo Hatton Classic Horror Awards | March 30, 2011 | Best Film | Inception | Nominated | |
| Russian National Movie Awards | April 10, 2011 | Best Foreign Action Film | Inception | Won | |
| Russian National Movie Awards | April 10, 2011 | Best Foreign Actor | Leonardo DiCaprio | Won (Note: Also for Shutter Island) | |
| Russian National Movie Awards | April 10, 2011 | Best Foreign Drama Film | Inception | Nominated | |
| Russian National Movie Awards | April 10, 2011 | Filmz.ru True Movie – Reader's Choice | Inception | Won | |
| San Diego Film Critics Society Awards | December 14, 2010 | Best Film | Inception | Nominated | |
| San Diego Film Critics Society Awards | December 14, 2010 | Best Director | Christopher Nolan | Nominated | |
| San Diego Film Critics Society Awards | December 14, 2010 | Best Original Screenplay | Christopher Nolan | Nominated | |
| San Diego Film Critics Society Awards | December 14, 2010 | Best Cinematography | Wally Pfister | Won | |
| San Diego Film Critics Society Awards | December 14, 2010 | Best Editing | Lee Smith | Nominated | |
| San Diego Film Critics Society Awards | December 14, 2010 | Best Production Design | Guy Hendrix Dyas | Nominated | |
| Satellite Awards | December 19, 2010 | Best Motion Picture, Drama | Inception | Nominated | |
| Satellite Awards | December 19, 2010 | Best Director | Christopher Nolan | Nominated | |
| Satellite Awards | December 19, 2010 | Best Actor in a Motion Picture, Drama | Leonardo DiCaprio | Nominated | |
| Satellite Awards | December 19, 2010 | Best Actress in a Supporting Role | Marion Cotillard | Nominated | |
| Satellite Awards | December 19, 2010 | Best Original Screenplay | Christopher Nolan | Nominated | |
| Satellite Awards | December 19, 2010 | Best Art Direction & Production Design | Guy Hendrix Dyas, Luke Freeborn, Brad Ricker and Dean Wolcott | Won | |
| Satellite Awards | December 19, 2010 | Best Cinematography | Wally Pfister | Won | |
| Satellite Awards | December 19, 2010 | Best Editing | Lee Smith | Nominated | |
| Satellite Awards | December 19, 2010 | Best Original Score | Hans Zimmer | Won | |
| Satellite Awards | December 19, 2010 | Best Sound | Richard King, Ed Novick, Lora Hirschberg and Gary A. Rizzo | Nominated | |
| Satellite Awards | December 19, 2010 | Best Visual Effects | Paul Franklin, Chris Corbould, Andrew Lockley and Peter Bebb | Nominated | |
| Saturn Awards | June 23, 2011 | Best Science Fiction Film | Inception | Won | |
| Saturn Awards | June 23, 2011 | Best Actor | Leonardo DiCaprio | Nominated | |
| Saturn Awards | June 23, 2011 | Best Actress | Elliot Page | Nominated | |
| Saturn Awards | June 23, 2011 | Best Supporting Actor | Tom Hardy | Nominated | |
| Saturn Awards | June 23, 2011 | Best Director | Christopher Nolan | Won | |
| Saturn Awards | June 23, 2011 | Best Writing | Christopher Nolan | Won | |
| Saturn Awards | June 23, 2011 | Best Music | Hans Zimmer | Won | |
| Saturn Awards | June 23, 2011 | Best Production Design | Guy Hendrix Dyas | Nominated | |
| Saturn Awards | June 23, 2011 | Best Special Effects | Paul Franklin, Chris Corbould, Andrew Lockley, and Peter Bebb | Won | |
| Scream Awards | October 16, 2010 | The Ultimate Scream | Inception | Won | |
| Scream Awards | October 16, 2010 | Best Science Fiction Movie | Inception | Won | |
| Scream Awards | October 16, 2010 | Best Director | Christopher Nolan | Nominated | |
| Scream Awards | October 16, 2010 | Best Scream-play | Christopher Nolan | Nominated | |
| Scream Awards | October 16, 2010 | Best Science Fiction Actor | Leonardo DiCaprio | Won | |
| Scream Awards | October 16, 2010 | Best Science Fiction Actress | Elliot Page | Nominated | |
| Scream Awards | October 16, 2010 | Best Supporting Actor | Joseph Gordon-Levitt | Won | |
| Scream Awards | October 16, 2010 | Best Supporting Actress | Marion Cotillard | Nominated | |
| Scream Awards | October 16, 2010 | Best Breakout Performance - Male | Tom Hardy | Won | |
| Scream Awards | October 16, 2010 | Best Cameo | Michael Caine | Nominated | |
| Scream Awards | October 16, 2010 | Best Ensemble | Inception | Nominated | |
| Scream Awards | October 16, 2010 | Fight Scene of the Year | Inception (for "Anti-Gravity Hotel Fight") | Won | |
| Scream Awards | October 16, 2010 | Holy Sh*t Scene of the Year | Inception (for "Freight train drives through city street") | Nominated | |
| Scream Awards | October 16, 2010 | Holy Sh*t Scene of the Year | Inception (for "Paris street folds over onto itself") | Nominated | |
| Scream Awards | October 16, 2010 | Best F/X | Inception | Nominated | |
| Screen Actors Guild Awards | January 30, 2011 | Outstanding Performance by a Stunt Ensemble in a Motion Picture | Inception | Won | |
| St. Louis Film Critics Association Awards | December 20, 2010 | Best Film | Inception | Nominated | |
| St. Louis Film Critics Association Awards | December 20, 2010 | Best Director | Christopher Nolan | Runner-up | |
| St. Louis Film Critics Association Awards | December 20, 2010 | Best Visual Effects | Inception | Won | |
| St. Louis Film Critics Association Awards | December 20, 2010 | Best Original Screenplay | Christopher Nolan | Runner-up | |
| St. Louis Film Critics Association Awards | December 20, 2010 | Best Music | Inception | Runner-up (Note: Tied with Black Swan) | |
| St. Louis Film Critics Association Awards | December 20, 2010 | Moving the Medium Forward | Inception | Won | |
| St. Louis Film Critics Association Awards | December 20, 2010 | Special Merit | Inception (for "the zero-gravity hotel hallway fight scene with Joseph Gordon-Levitt") | Won (Note: Tied with 127 Hours) | |
| Taurus World Stunt Awards | May 14, 2011 | Best Speciality Stunt | George Cottle, Marie Fink, Adam Hart, Terry Jackson and Mark Rayner | Nominated | |
| Taurus World Stunt Awards | May 14, 2011 | Best Fight | Andy Bradshaw, Rick English, Marvin Stewart-Campbell and Richard Wu | Won | |
| Taurus World Stunt Awards | May 14, 2011 | Best High Work | Brent Connolly and Jodi Stecyk | Nominated | |
| Taurus World Stunt Awards | May 14, 2011 | Best Stunt Coordinator And/Or 2nd Unit Director | Sy Hollands, Tom Struthers and Brent Woolsey | Won | |
| Teen Choice Awards | August 8, 2010 | Choice Summer Movie | Inception | Nominated | |
| Toronto Film Critics Association Awards | December 14, 2010 | Best Director | Christopher Nolan | Runner-up (Note: Tied with Darren Aronofsky for Black Swan) | |
| Turkish Film Critics Association Awards | February 24, 2011 | Best Foreign Film | Inception | 3rd Place | |
| Vancouver Film Critics Circle Awards | January 11, 2011 | Best Screenplay | Christopher Nolan | Nominated | |
| Visual Effects Society Awards | February 1, 2011 | Outstanding Visual Effects in a Visual Effects-Driven Feature Motion Picture | Paul Franklin, Chris Corbould, Mike Chambers and Matthew Plummer | Won | |
| Visual Effects Society Awards | February 1, 2011 | Outstanding Created Environment in a Live Action Feature Motion Picture | Bruno Baron, Dan Neal, Graham Page, Per Mork-Jensen (for "Paris Dreamscape") | Won | |
| Visual Effects Society Awards | February 1, 2011 | Outstanding Models & Miniatures in a Feature Motion Picture | Ian Hunter and Scott Beverly, Forest Fischer, Robert Spurlock (for "Hospital Fortress Destruction") | Won | |
| Visual Effects Society Awards | February 1, 2011 | Outstanding Compositing in a Feature Motion Picture | Astrid Busser-Casas, Scott Pritchard, Jan Maroske and George Zwier | Won | |
| Washington D.C. Area Film Critics Association Awards | December 6, 2010 | Best Film | Inception | Nominated | |
| Washington D.C. Area Film Critics Association Awards | December 6, 2010 | Best Director | Christopher Nolan | Nominated | |
| Washington D.C. Area Film Critics Association Awards | December 6, 2010 | Best Original Screenplay | Christopher Nolan | Won | |
| Washington D.C. Area Film Critics Association Awards | December 6, 2010 | Best Acting Ensemble | Inception | Nominated | |
| Washington D.C. Area Film Critics Association Awards | December 6, 2010 | Best Art Direction | Guy Hendrix Dyas, Luke Freeborn, Brad Ricker and Dean Wolcott | Won | |
| Washington D.C. Area Film Critics Association Awards | December 6, 2010 | Best Cinematography | Wally Pfister | Won | |
| Washington D.C. Area Film Critics Association Awards | December 6, 2010 | Best Score | Hans Zimmer | Won | |
| World Soundtrack Awards | October 22, 2011 | Best Original Soundtrack of the Year | Hans Zimmer | Won | |
| World Soundtrack Awards | October 22, 2011 | Film Composer of the Year | Hans Zimmer (Note: Also for How Do You Know, Kung Fu Panda 2, Megamind, Pirates of the Caribbean: On Stranger Tides, Rango and The Dilemma) | Nominated | |
| Writers Guild of America Awards | February 5, 2011 | Best Original Screenplay | Christopher Nolan | Won | |
