= List of accolades received by Interstellar =

Interstellar accolades
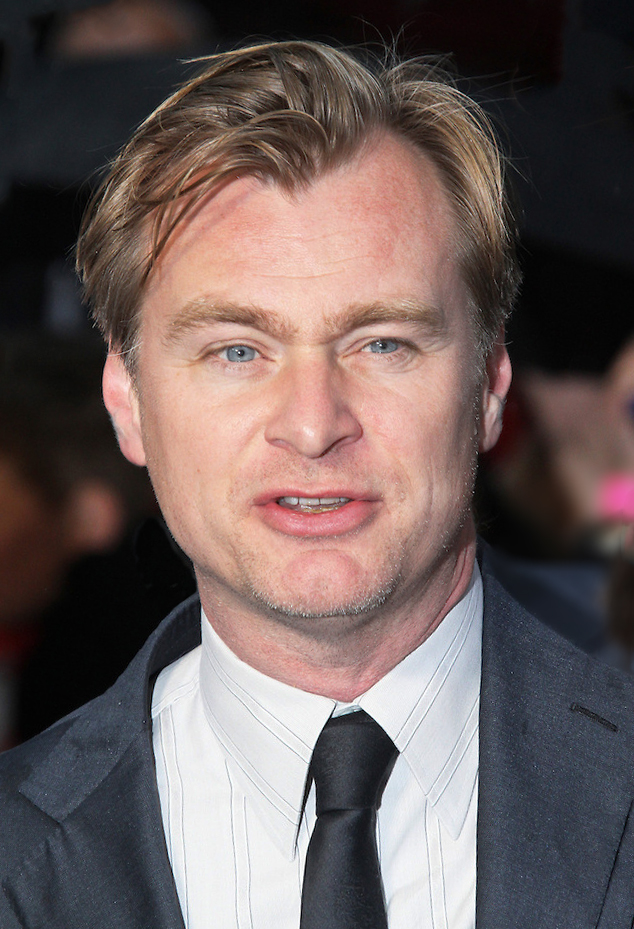
- Christopher Nolan received multiple accolades for his direction.
Awards and nominations
| Award | Wins | Nominations |
| Academy Awards | 1 | 5 |
| Alliance of Women Film Journalists EDA Awards | 0 | 1 |
| American Film Institute Awards | 1 | 1 |
| Art Directors Guild Awards | 0 | 1 |
| Black Reel Awards | 0 | 1 |
| British Academy Film Awards | 1 | 4 |
| Chicago Film Critics Association Awards | 0 | 4 |
| Cinema Audio Society Awards | 0 | 1 |
| Costume Designers Guild Awards | 0 | 1 |
| Critics' Choice Movie Awards | 1 | 7 |
| Dallas–Fort Worth Film Critics Association Awards | 2 | 2 |
| Dorian Awards | 0 | 1 |
| Empire Awards | 2 | 3 |
| Florida Film Critics Circle Awards | 3 | 4 |
| Georgia Film Critics Association Awards | 1 | 3 |
| Golden Globe Awards | 0 | 1 |
| Golden Reel Awards | 0 | 2 |
| Grammy Awards | 0 | 1 |
| Houston Film Critics Society Awards | 0 | 2 |
| Hugo Awards | 0 | 1 |
| International Film Music Critics Association Awards | 1 | 3 |
| Make-Up Artists and Hair Stylists Guild Awards | 0 | 2 |
| Nebula Awards | 0 | 1 |
| San Diego Film Critics Society Awards | 0 | 2 |
| Santa Barbara International Film Festival Awards | 1 | 1 |
| Satellite Awards | 0 | 3 |
| Saturn Awards | 6 | 11 |
| St. Louis Film Critics Association Awards | 1 | 4 |
| Teen Choice Awards | 0 | 1 |
| Visual Effects Society Awards | 1 | 4 |
| Washington D.C. Area Film Critics Association Awards | 0 | 5 |
| Women Film Critics Circle Awards | 1 | 1 |
| World Soundtrack Awards | 0 | 2 |
| Young Artist Awards | 0 | 1 |

Totals (Note: Certain award groups do not simply award one winner. They acknowledge several different recipients, have runners-up, and have third place. Since this is a specific recognition and is different from losing an award, runner-up mentions are considered wins in this award tally. For simplification and to avoid errors, each award in this list has been presumed to have had a prior nomination.)
- Wins: 23
- Nominations: 87

Interstellar is a 2014 epic and science fiction film directed by Christopher Nolan, who wrote the screenplay with his brother Jonathan. Christopher Nolan also produced the film with Emma Thomas, under their label Syncopy, and Lynda Obst Productions. It stars Matthew McConaughey, Anne Hathaway, Jessica Chastain, Bill Irwin, Ellen Burstyn, John Lithgow, Michael Caine, Casey Affleck, and Matt Damon. Set in a dystopian future where humanity is embroiled in a catastrophic blight and famine, the film follows a group of astronauts who travel through a wormhole near Saturn in search of a new home for mankind.

Interstellar premiered in the United States on October 26, 2014 at the TCL Chinese Theatre in Los Angeles, and in Europe on October 29 at the Odeon Leicester Square in London. The film had a limited release in IMAX theatres across North America on November 5, with a wide release on November 7. It was released in most countries on November 6 and 7, and in additional territories over the following month. Produced on a budget of $165 million, Interstellar grossed $681 million worldwide, concluding its original theatrical run as the tenth-highest-grossing film of 2014. Subsequent re-releases have increased its total gross to $759 million. The film was positively reviewed by critics and was praised for its scientific accuracy, particularly the depiction of the black hole Gargantua, but received some criticism for the ice clouds on Mann's planet. On the review aggregator website Rotten Tomatoes, the film holds an approval rating of 73% based on 375 reviews.

Interstellar garnered awards and nominations in various categories, with particular recognition for Nolan's direction, Hans Zimmer's musical score, Hoyte van Hoytema's cinematography, Nathan Crowley's production design, and its visual effects. It received five nominations at the 87th Academy Awards, winning Best Visual Effects. At the 68th British Academy Film Awards, it was nominated for Best Original Music, Best Cinematography and Best Production Design, and won Best Special Visual Effects. Zimmer was nominated for Best Score Soundtrack for Visual Media at the 58th Grammy Awards. The film also received eleven nominations at the 41st Saturn Awards, where it won six awards, and seven nominations at the 20th Critics' Choice Awards, winning Best Sci-Fi/Horror Movie. Interstellar was named one of the Top 11 Films of 2014 by the American Film Institute.

== Accolades ==
Accolades received by Interstellar
| Award | Date of ceremony | Category | Recipient(s) | Result | Ref. |
|---|---|---|---|---|---|
| Academy Awards | February 22, 2015 | Best Original Score | Hans Zimmer | Nominated | |
| Academy Awards | February 22, 2015 | Best Production Design | Nathan Crowley and Gary Fettis | Nominated | |
| Academy Awards | February 22, 2015 | Best Sound Editing | Richard King | Nominated | |
| Academy Awards | February 22, 2015 | Best Sound Mixing | Gary Rizzo, Gregg Landaker, and Mark Weingarten | Nominated | |
| Academy Awards | February 22, 2015 | Best Visual Effects | Paul Franklin, Andrew Lockley, Ian Hunter, and Scott Fisher | Won | |
| Alliance of Women Film Journalists EDA Awards | January 12, 2015 | Best Cinematography | Hoyte van Hoytema | Nominated | |
| American Film Institute Awards | December 8, 2014 | Top 11 Films of the Year | Interstellar | Won (Note: This award does not have a single winner, but recognizes multiple films.) | |
| Art Directors Guild Awards | January 31, 2015 | Excellence in Production Design for a Fantasy Film | Nathan Crowley | Nominated | |
| Black Reel Awards | February 19, 2015 | Outstanding Breakthrough Performance, Male | David Gyasi | Nominated | |
| British Academy Film Awards | February 8, 2015 | Best Original Music | Hans Zimmer | Nominated | |
| British Academy Film Awards | February 8, 2015 | Best Cinematography | Hoyte van Hoytema | Nominated | |
| British Academy Film Awards | February 8, 2015 | Best Production Design | Nathan Crowley and Gary Fettis | Nominated | |
| British Academy Film Awards | February 8, 2015 | Best Special Visual Effects | Paul Franklin, Scott Fisher, Andrew Lockley and Ian Hunter | Won | |
| Chicago Film Critics Association Awards | December 15, 2014 | Best Director | Christopher Nolan | Nominated | |
| Chicago Film Critics Association Awards | December 15, 2014 | Best Art Direction | Nathan Crowley and Gary Fettis | Nominated | |
| Chicago Film Critics Association Awards | December 15, 2014 | Best Cinematography | Hoyte van Hoytema | Nominated | |
| Chicago Film Critics Association Awards | December 15, 2014 | Best Original Score | Hans Zimmer | Nominated | |
| Cinema Audio Society Awards | February 14, 2015 | Outstanding Achievement in Sound Mixing for a Motion Picture – Live Action | Mark Weingarten, Gary Rizzo, Gregg Landaker, Alan Meyerson, Thomas J. O’Connell, and Mary Jo Lang | Nominated | |
| Costume Designers Guild Awards | February 17, 2015 | Excellence in Contemporary Film | Mary Zophres | Nominated | |
| Critics' Choice Movie Awards | January 15, 2015 | Best Young Performer | Mackenzie Foy | Nominated | |
| Critics' Choice Movie Awards | January 15, 2015 | Best Cinematography | Hoyte van Hoytema | Nominated | |
| Critics' Choice Movie Awards | January 15, 2015 | Best Art Direction | Nathan Crowley and Gary Fettis | Nominated | |
| Critics' Choice Movie Awards | January 15, 2015 | Best Editing | Lee Smith | Nominated | |
| Critics' Choice Movie Awards | January 15, 2015 | Best Visual Effects | Interstellar | Nominated | |
| Critics' Choice Movie Awards | January 15, 2015 | Best Sci-Fi/Horror Movie | Interstellar | Won | |
| Critics' Choice Movie Awards | January 15, 2015 | Best Score | Hans Zimmer | Nominated | |
| Dallas–Fort Worth Film Critics Association Awards | December 15, 2014 | Best Cinematography | Hoyte van Hoytema | Runner-up | |
| Dallas–Fort Worth Film Critics Association Awards | December 15, 2014 | Best Musical Score | Hans Zimmer | Won | |
| Dorian Awards | March 1, 2015 | Visually Striking Film of the Year | Interstellar | Nominated | |
| Empire Awards | March 29, 2015 | Best Director | Christopher Nolan | Won | |
| Empire Awards | March 29, 2015 | Best Film | Interstellar | Won | |
| Empire Awards | March 29, 2015 | Best Sci-Fi/Fantasy | Interstellar | Nominated | |
| Florida Film Critics Circle Awards | December 19, 2014 | Best Cinematography | Hoyte van Hoytema | Won | |
| Florida Film Critics Circle Awards | December 19, 2014 | Best Visual Effects | Interstellar | Won | |
| Florida Film Critics Circle Awards | December 19, 2014 | Best Art Direction and Production Design | Nathan Crowley and Gary Fettis | Runner-up | |
| Florida Film Critics Circle Awards | December 19, 2014 | Best Score | Hans Zimmer | Nominated | |
| Georgia Film Critics Association Awards | January 9, 2015 | Best Cinematography | Hoyte van Hoytema | Nominated | |
| Georgia Film Critics Association Awards | January 9, 2015 | Best Production Design | Nathan Crowley and Gary Fettis | Nominated | |
| Georgia Film Critics Association Awards | January 9, 2015 | Best Original Score | Hans Zimmer | Won | |
| Golden Globe Awards | January 11, 2015 | Best Original Score | Hans Zimmer | Nominated | |
| Golden Reel Awards | February 15, 2015 | Best Sound Editing – Sound Effects and Foley in an English Language Feature | Richard King, Christopher Flick, Aaron Glascock, Ken J. Johnson, Michael W. Mitchell, Jeff Sawyer, Scott Curtis, Michael Dressel, Alyson Dee Moore and John Roesch | Nominated | |
| Golden Reel Awards | February 15, 2015 | Best Sound Editing – Music in a Feature Film | Alex Gibson and Ryan Rubin | Nominated | |
| Grammy Awards | February 15, 2016 | Best Score Soundtrack for Visual Media | Hans Zimmer | Nominated | |
| Houston Film Critics Society Awards | January 10, 2015 | Best Cinematography | Hoyte van Hoytema | Nominated | |
| Houston Film Critics Society Awards | January 10, 2015 | Best Original Score | Hans Zimmer | Nominated | |
| Hugo Awards | August 22, 2015 | Best Dramatic Presentation, Long Form | Interstellar | Nominated | |
| International Film Music Critics Association Awards | February 19, 2015 | Film Composer of the Year | Hans Zimmer | Nominated | |
| International Film Music Critics Association Awards | February 19, 2015 | Best Original Score for a Fantasy/Science Fiction/Horror Film | Hans Zimmer | Nominated | |
| International Film Music Critics Association Awards | February 19, 2015 | Film Score of the Year | Hans Zimmer | Won | |
| Make-Up Artists and Hair Stylists Guild Awards | February 14, 2015 | Best Contemporary Make-Up | Luisa Abel and Jay Wejebe | Nominated | |
| Make-Up Artists and Hair Stylists Guild Awards | February 14, 2015 | Best Contemporary Hair Styling | Patricia DeHaney and Jose L. Zamora | Nominated | |
| Nebula Awards | August 22, 2015 | Ray Bradbury Award | Christopher Nolan and Jonathan Nolan | Nominated | |
| San Diego Film Critics Society Awards | December 15, 2014 | Best Cinematography | Hoyte van Hoytema | Nominated | |
| San Diego Film Critics Society Awards | December 15, 2014 | Best Production Design | Nathan Crowley | Nominated | |
| Santa Barbara International Film Festival Awards | February 3, 2015 | Variety Artisans Award – Sound Mixing and Editing | Richard King and Mark Weingarten | Won | |
| Satellite Awards | February 15, 2015 | Best Cinematography | Hoyte van Hoytema | Nominated | |
| Satellite Awards | February 15, 2015 | Best Original Score | Hans Zimmer | Nominated | |
| Satellite Awards | February 15, 2015 | Best Visual Effects | Interstellar | Nominated | |
| Saturn Awards | June 25, 2015 | Best Science Fiction Film | Interstellar | Won | |
| Saturn Awards | June 25, 2015 | Best Director | Christopher Nolan | Nominated | |
| Saturn Awards | June 25, 2015 | Best Writing | Christopher Nolan and Jonathan Nolan | Won | |
| Saturn Awards | June 25, 2015 | Best Actor | Matthew McConaughey | Nominated | |
| Saturn Awards | June 25, 2015 | Best Actress | Anne Hathaway | Nominated | |
| Saturn Awards | June 25, 2015 | Best Supporting Actress | Jessica Chastain | Nominated | |
| Saturn Awards | June 25, 2015 | Best Performance by a Younger Actor | Mackenzie Foy | Won | |
| Saturn Awards | June 25, 2015 | Best Music | Hans Zimmer | Won | |
| Saturn Awards | June 25, 2015 | Best Editing | Lee Smith | Nominated | |
| Saturn Awards | June 25, 2015 | Best Production Design | Nathan Crowley | Won | |
| Saturn Awards | June 25, 2015 | Best Special Effects | Paul Franklin, Andrew Lockley, Ian Hunter, and Scott Fisher | Won | |
| St. Louis Film Critics Association Awards | December 15, 2014 | Best Supporting Actress | Mackenzie Foy | Nominated | |
| St. Louis Film Critics Association Awards | December 15, 2014 | Best Cinematography | Hoyte van Hoytema | Nominated | |
| St. Louis Film Critics Association Awards | December 15, 2014 | Best Visual Effects | Interstellar | Won | |
| St. Louis Film Critics Association Awards | December 15, 2014 | Best Music Score | Hans Zimmer | Nominated | |
| Teen Choice Awards | August 16, 2015 | Choice Movie Actress: Sci-Fi/Fantasy | Mackenzie Foy | Nominated | |
| Visual Effects Society Awards | February 4, 2015 | Outstanding Visual Effects in a Visual Effects-Driven Photoreal/Live Action Feature Motion Picture | Paul Franklin, Kevin Elam, Ann Podlozny, Andrew Lockley, and Scott Fisher | Nominated | |
| Visual Effects Society Awards | February 4, 2015 | Outstanding Created Environment in a Photoreal/Live Action Feature Motion Picture | Tom Bracht, Graham Page, Thomas Døhlen, and Kirsty Clark (for "Tesseract") | Won | |
| Visual Effects Society Awards | February 4, 2015 | Outstanding Virtual Cinematography in a Photoreal/Live Action Motion Media Project | Faraz Hameed, Stephen Painter, Hoyte van Hoytema, and Dorian Knapp (for "Tesseract") | Nominated | |
| Visual Effects Society Awards | February 4, 2015 | Outstanding Compositing in a Photoreal/Live Action Feature Motion Picture | Raphael Hamm, Isaac Layish, Sebastian Von Overheidtm, and Tristan Myles (for "Water") | Nominated | |
| Washington D.C. Area Film Critics Association Awards | December 8, 2014 | Best Art Direction | Nathan Crowley and Gary Fettis | Nominated | |
| Washington D.C. Area Film Critics Association Awards | December 8, 2014 | Best Cinematography | Hoyte van Hoytema | Nominated | |
| Washington D.C. Area Film Critics Association Awards | December 8, 2014 | Best Editing | Lee Smith | Nominated | |
| Washington D.C. Area Film Critics Association Awards | December 8, 2014 | Best Score | Hans Zimmer | Nominated | |
| Washington D.C. Area Film Critics Association Awards | December 8, 2014 | Best Youth Performance | Mackenzie Foy | Nominated | |
| Women Film Critics Circle Awards | December 14, 2014 | A Woman's Right to Male Roles in Movies | Jessica Chastain | Won | |
| World Soundtrack Awards | October 24, 2015 | Best Original Film Score of the Year | Hans Zimmer | Nominated | |
| World Soundtrack Awards | October 24, 2015 | Film Composer of the Year | Hans Zimmer | Nominated | |
| Young Artist Awards | May 15, 2015 | Best Performance in a Feature Film – Supporting Young Actress | Mackenzie Foy | Nominated | |
