= 16th Critics' Choice Awards =

2011 US film awards

- Date: January 14, 2011
- Official website: www.criticschoice.com

Highlights
- Best Film: The Social Network
- Most awards: Inception (6)
- Most nominations: Black Swan (12)

Television coverage
- Network: VH1

The 16th Critics' Choice Awards were presented on January 14, 2011 at the Hollywood Palladium, honoring the finest achievements of 2010 filmmaking. The ceremony was broadcast on VH1. The nominees were announced on December 13, 2010.

== Winners and nominees ==
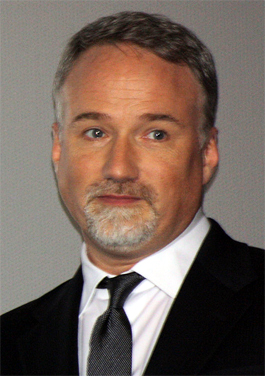
David Fincher, Best Director winner

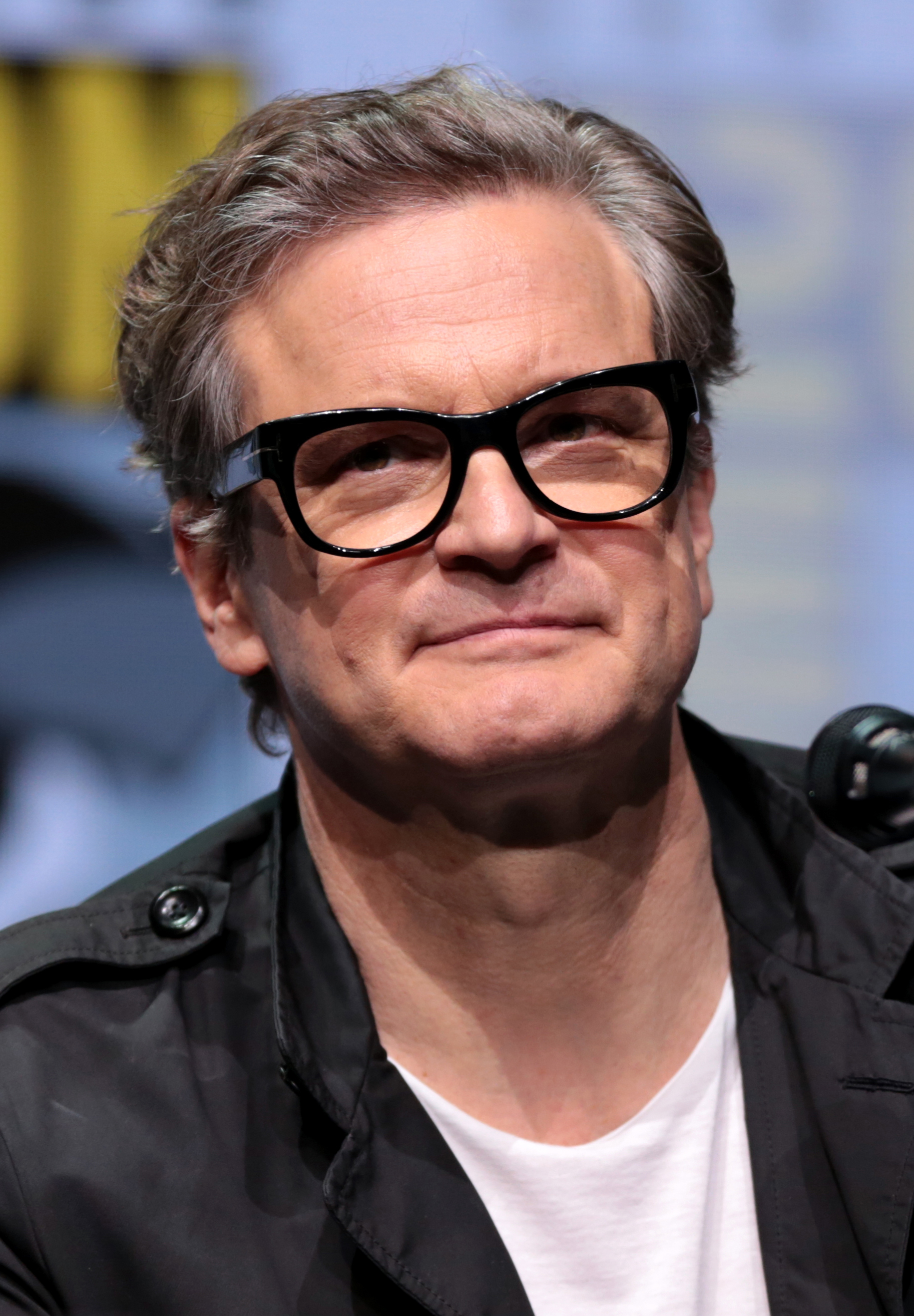
Colin Firth, Best Actor winner

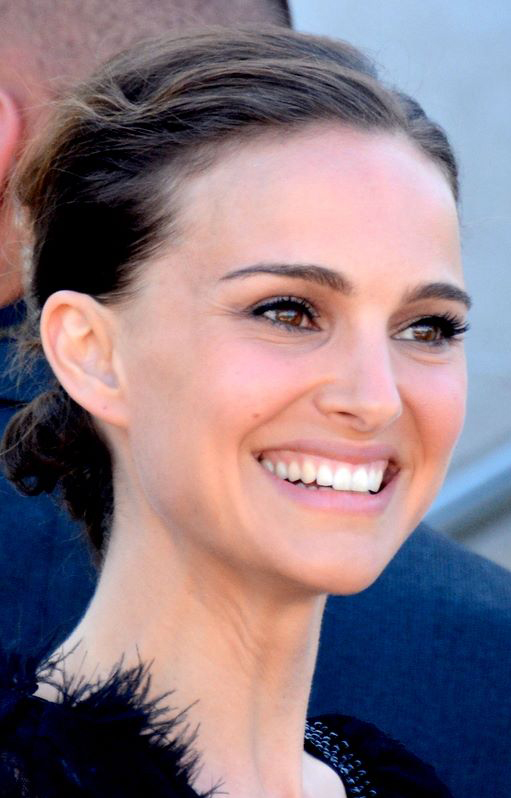
Natalie Portman, Best Actress winner

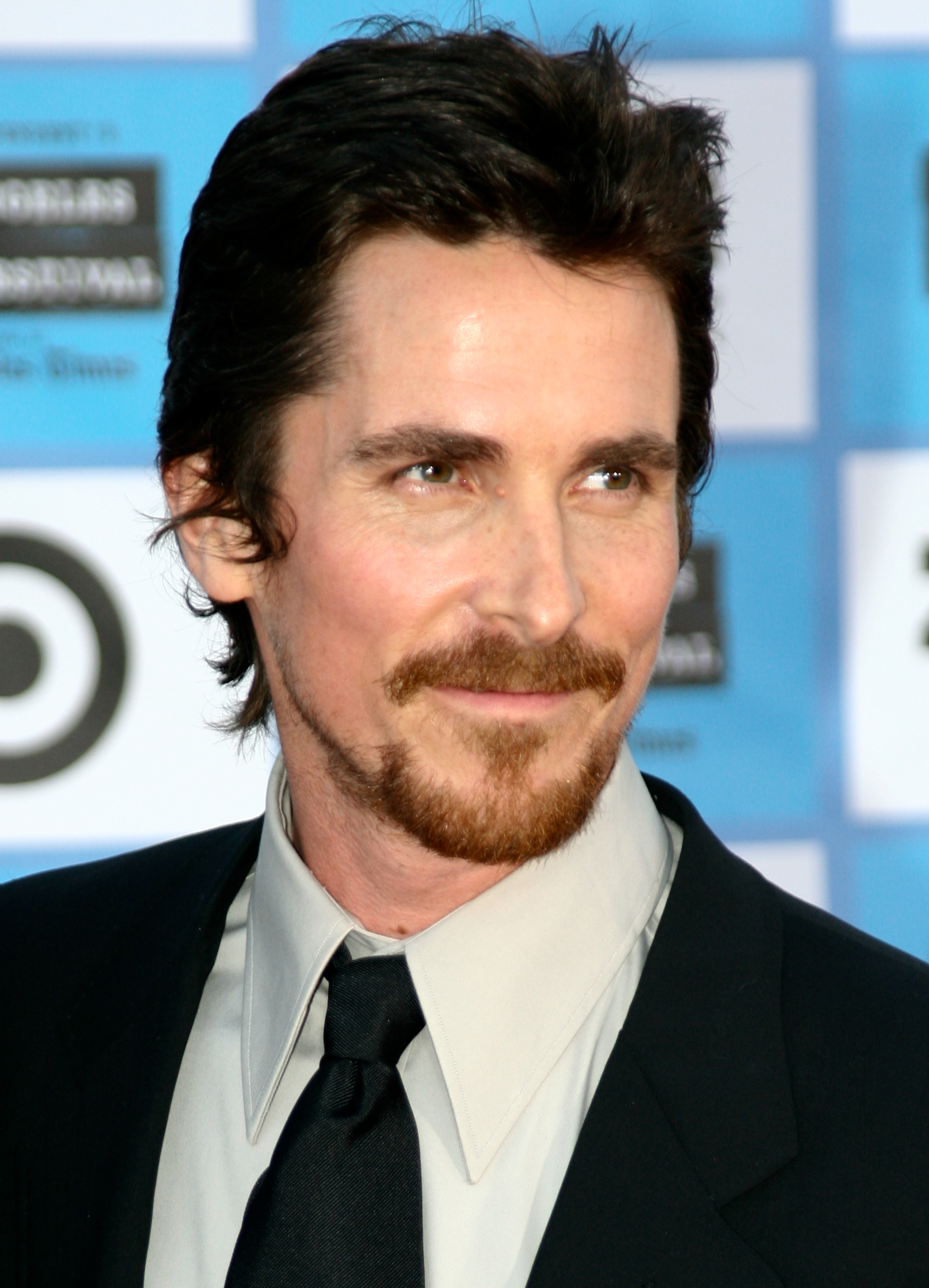
Christian Bale, Best Supporting Actor winner

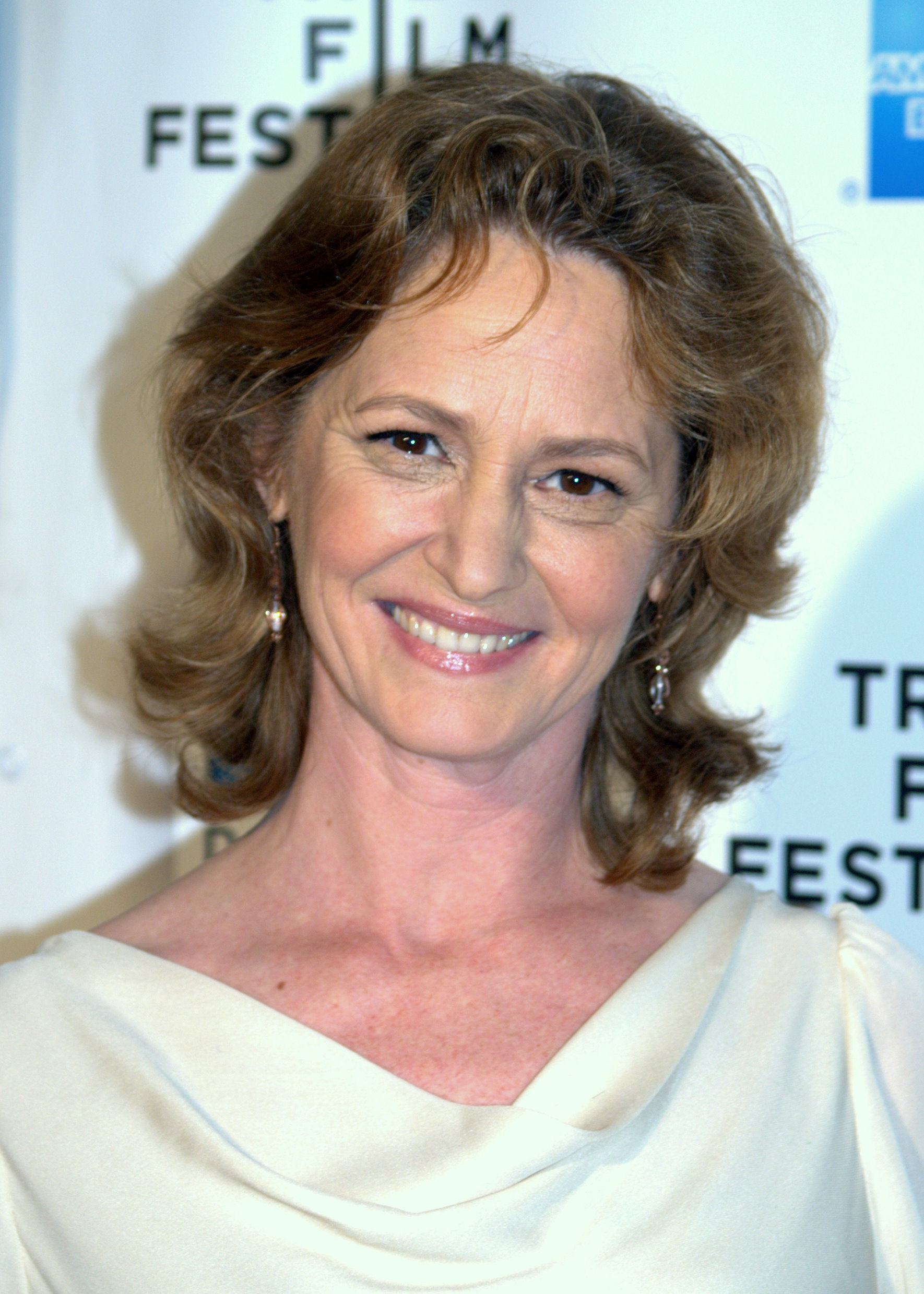
Melissa Leo, Best Supporting Actress winner

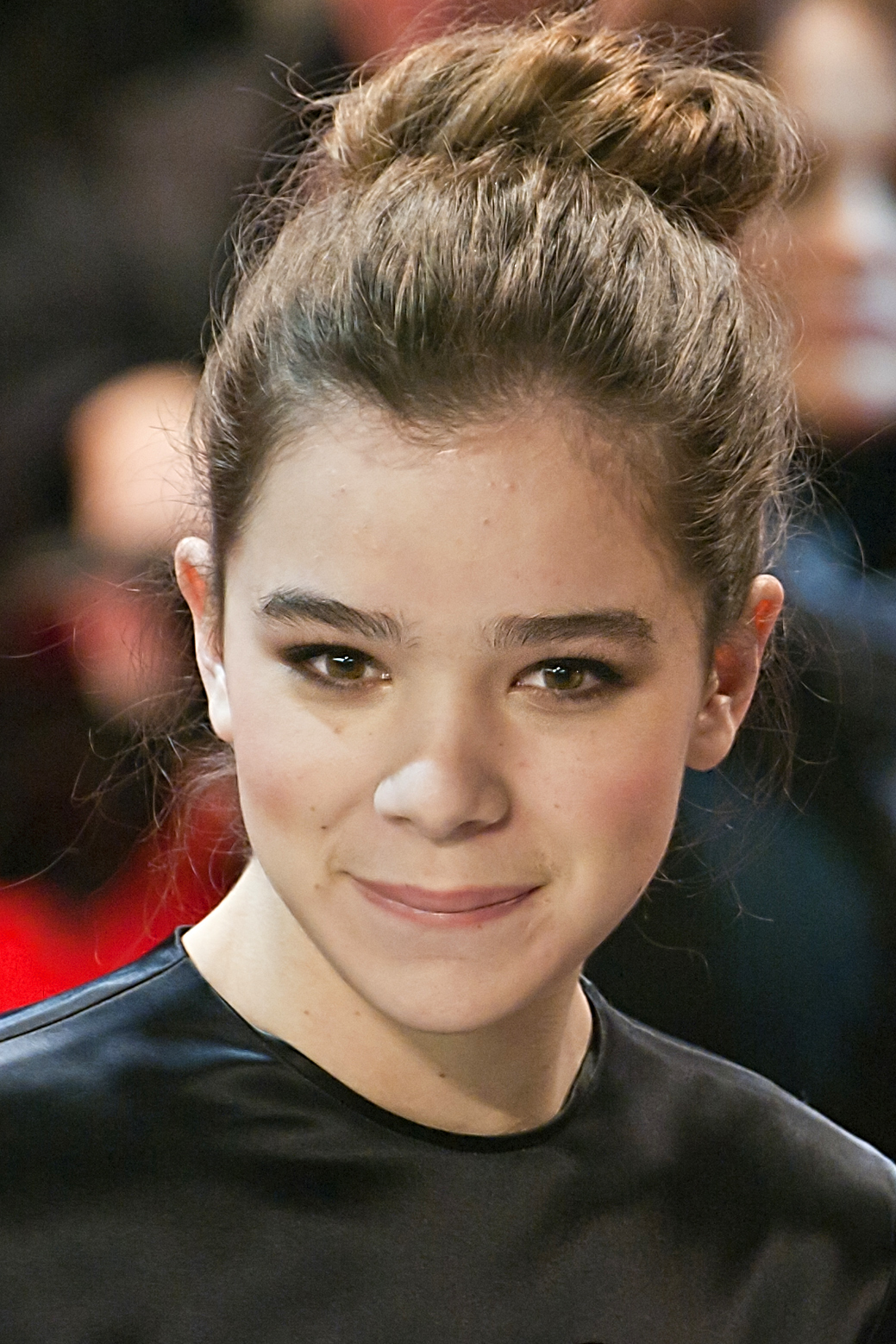
Hailee Steinfeld, Best Young Actor/Actress winner

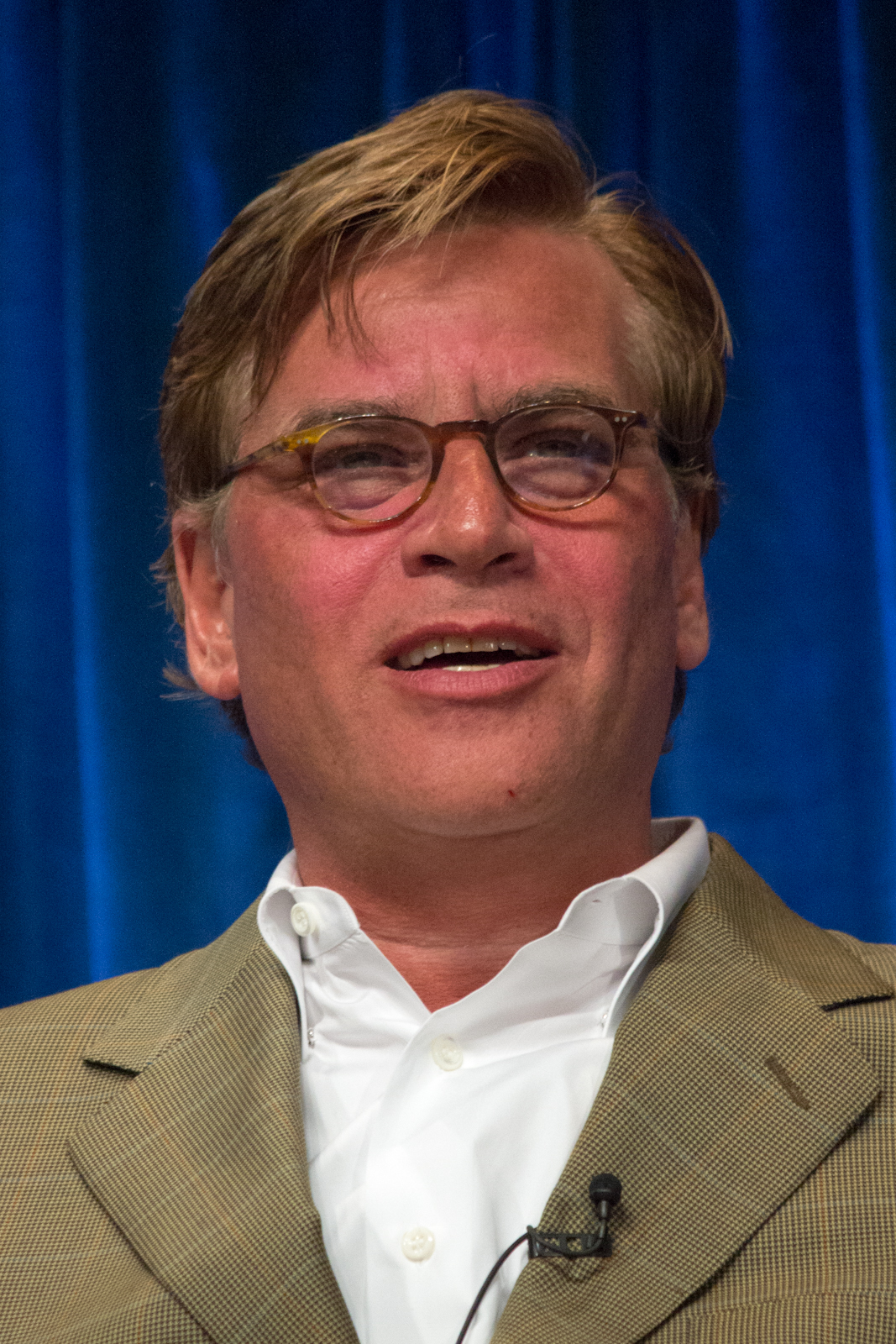
Aaron Sorkin, Best Adapted Screenplay winner

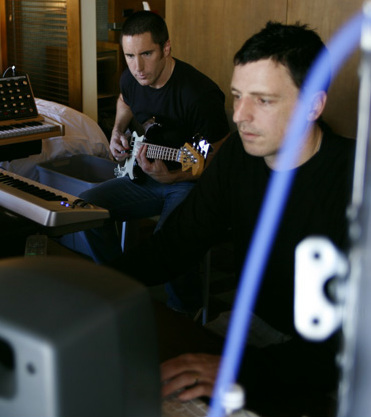
Trent Reznor (left) and Atticus Ross (right), Best Score co-winners

Best Picture The Social Network: 127 Hours; Black Swan; The Fighter; Inception; The King's Speech; The Town; Toy Story 3; True Grit; Winter's Bone	Best Director David Fincher – The Social Network: Darren Aronofsky – Black Swan; Danny Boyle – 127 Hours; Joel Coen and Ethan Coen – True Grit; Tom Hooper – The King's Speech; Christopher Nolan – Inception
Best Actor Colin Firth – The King's Speech as King George VI: Jeff Bridges – True Grit as Deputy U.S. Marshal Rooster Cogburn; Robert Duvall – Get Low as Felix Bush; Jesse Eisenberg – The Social Network as Mark Zuckerberg; James Franco – 127 Hours as Aron Ralston; Ryan Gosling – Blue Valentine as Dean Pereira	Best Actress Natalie Portman – Black Swan as Nina Sayers: Annette Bening – The Kids Are All Right as Dr. Nicole "Nic" Allgood; Nicole Kidman – Rabbit Hole as Becca Corbett; Jennifer Lawrence – Winter's Bone as Ree Dolly; Noomi Rapace – The Girl with the Dragon Tattoo as Lisbeth Salander; Michelle Williams – Blue Valentine as Cindy Heller
Best Supporting Actor Christian Bale – The Fighter as Dicky Eklund: Andrew Garfield – The Social Network as Eduardo Saverin; Jeremy Renner – The Town as James "Jem" Coughlin; Sam Rockwell – Conviction as Kenny Waters; Mark Ruffalo – The Kids Are All Right as Paul Hatfield; Geoffrey Rush – The King's Speech as Lionel Logue	Best Supporting Actress Melissa Leo – The Fighter as Alice Eklund-Ward: Amy Adams – The Fighter as Charlene Fleming; Helena Bonham Carter – The King's Speech as Queen Elizabeth; Mila Kunis – Black Swan as Lily; Hailee Steinfeld – True Grit as Mattie Ross; Jacki Weaver – Animal Kingdom as Janine "Smurf" Cody
Best Young Actor/Actress Hailee Steinfeld – True Grit as Mattie Ross: Elle Fanning – Somewhere as Cleo; Jennifer Lawrence – Winter's Bone as Ree Dolly; Chloë Grace Moretz – Kick-Ass as Mindy Macready / Hit-Girl; Chloë Grace Moretz – Let Me In as Abby; Kodi Smit-McPhee – Let Me In as Owen	Best Acting Ensemble The Fighter: The Kids Are All Right; The King's Speech; The Social Network; The Town
Best Original Screenplay The King's Speech – David Seidler: Another Year – Mike Leigh; Black Swan – Mark Heyman, Andres Heinz, and John McLaughlin; The Fighter – Scott Silver, Paul Tamasy, and Eric Johnson (story by Keith Dorrington, Paul Tamasy, and Eric Johnson); Inception – Christopher Nolan; The Kids Are All Right – Lisa Cholodenko and Stuart Blumberg	Best Adapted Screenplay The Social Network – Aaron Sorkin: 127 Hours – Simon Beaufoy and Danny Boyle; The Town – Ben Affleck, Peter Craig, and Aaron Stockard; Toy Story 3 – Michael Arndt (story by John Lasseter, Andrew Stanton, and Lee Unkrich); True Grit – Joel Coen and Ethan Coen; Winter's Bone – Debra Granik and Anne Rosellini
Best Animated Feature Toy Story 3: Despicable Me; How to Train Your Dragon; The Illusionist; Tangled	Best Documentary Feature Waiting for "Superman": Exit Through the Gift Shop; Inside Job; Joan Rivers: A Piece of Work; Restrepo; The Tillman Story
Best Action Movie Inception: Kick-Ass; Red; The Town; Unstoppable	Best Comedy Movie Easy A: Cyrus; Date Night; Get Him to the Greek; I Love You Phillip Morris; The Other Guys
Best Foreign Language Film The Girl with the Dragon Tattoo • Denmark / Germany / Sweden: Biutiful • Mexico / Spain; I Am Love • Italy	Best Art Direction Inception – Guy Hendrix Dyas (Production Design) / Larry Dias and Doug Mowat (Set Decoration): Alice in Wonderland – Robert Stromberg (Production Design) / Karen O'Hara (Set Decoration); Black Swan – Thérèse DePrez (Production Design) / Tora Peterson (Set Decoration); The King's Speech – Eve Stewart (Production Design) / Judy Farr (Set Decoration); True Grit – Jess Gonchor (Production Design) / Nancy Haigh (Set Decoration)
Best Cinematography Inception – Wally Pfister: 127 Hours – Anthony Dod Mantle and Enrique Chediak; Black Swan – Matthew Libatique; The King's Speech – Danny Cohen; True Grit – Roger Deakins	Best Costume Design Alice in Wonderland – Colleen Atwood: Black Swan – Amy Westcott; The King's Speech – Jenny Beavan; True Grit – Mary Zophres
Best Editing Inception – Lee Smith: 127 Hours – Jon Harris; Black Swan – Andrew Weisblum; The Social Network – Kirk Baxter and Angus Wall	Best Makeup Alice in Wonderland: Black Swan; Harry Potter and the Deathly Hallows – Part 1; True Grit
Best Score The Social Network – Trent Reznor and Atticus Ross: Black Swan – Clint Mansell; Inception – Hans Zimmer; The King's Speech – Alexandre Desplat; True Grit – Carter Burwell	Best Song "If I Rise" – 127 Hours: "I See the Light" – Tangled; "Shine" – Waiting for "Superman"; "We Belong Together" – Toy Story 3; "You Haven't Seen the Last of Me" – Burlesque
Best Sound Inception: 127 Hours; Black Swan; The Social Network; Toy Story 3	Best Visual Effects Inception: Alice in Wonderland; Harry Potter and the Deathly Hallows – Part 1; Tron: Legacy

=== Best Picture Made for Television ===
The Pacific

- Temple Grandin
- You Don't Know Jack

=== Joel Siegel Award ===
Matt Damon

=== Music+Film Award ===
Quentin Tarantino

== Statistics ==
Nominations	Film
12	Black Swan
11	The King's Speech
11	True Grit
10	Inception
9	The Social Network
8	127 Hours
6	The Fighter
5	The Town
5	Toy Story 3
4	Alice in Wonderland
4	The Kids Are All Right
4	Winter's Bone
2	Blue Valentine
2	The Girl with the Dragon Tattoo
2	Harry Potter and the Deathly Hallows – Part 1
2	Kick-Ass
2	Let Me In
2	Tangled
2	Waiting for "Superman"

Wins	Film
6	Inception
4	The Social Network
3	The Fighter
2	Alice in Wonderland
2	The King's Speech
