= Peter Bebb =

American special effects supervisor

- Occupation: Visual effects artist
- Years active: 2000-present

Peter Bebb is a special effects artist best known for working on The Dark Knight trilogy.

He won at the 83rd Academy Awards for the film Inception in the category of Best Visual Effects. His win was shared with Chris Corbould, Paul Franklin and Andrew Lockley

== Selected filmography ==
- Terminator Genisys (2015)
- Thor: The Dark World (2013)
- The Dark Knight Rises (2012)
- Captain America: The First Avenger (2011)
- Inception (2010)
- Prince of Persia: The Sands of Time (2010)
- The Dark Knight (2008)
- Inkheart (2008)
- Batman Begins (2005)
- Harry Potter and the Goblet of Fire (2005)
- The Chronicles of Riddick (2004)
- Die Another Day (2002)
- Harry Potter and the Chamber of Secrets (2002)
- Nutty Professor II: The Klumps (2000)
- Pitch Black (2000)
