= Broadcast Film Critics Association Awards 2011 =

Broadcast Film Critics Association Awards 2011 may refer to:

- 16th Critics' Choice Awards, the sixteenth Critics' Choice Awards ceremony that took place in 2011
- 17th Critics' Choice Awards, the seventeenth Critics' Choice Awards ceremony that took place in 2012 and which honored the best in film for 2011
