= Scott R. Fisher =

American special effects supervisor

- Born: Scott Ray Fisher; 1967 (age 58–59); Kodiak, Alaska, U.S.
- Other name: Scott Fisher
- Occupation: Special Effects Artist
- Years active: 1995–present
- Spouse: Melissa “missy” Frick
- Parent(s): Thomas L. Fisher (father) and Paula Fisher (mother)

Scott Ray Fisher is an American special effects supervisor.

He won at the 87th Academy Awards for his work on the film Interstellar and at the 93rd Academy Awards for his work on Tenet. These were in the category of Best Visual Effects. His win for Interstellar was shared with Paul Franklin, Andrew Lockley and Ian Hunter. And his second win for Tenet was shared with Andrew Jackson, David Lee and Andrew Lockley. He lives with his wife and children in Simi Valley. In 2022, he earned his first Primetime Emmy Award nomination which resulted to a win in the category Outstanding Special Visual Effects for his work on the television program The Book of Boba Fett and was shared with Richard Bluff, Abbigail Keller, Paul Kavanagh, Cameron Neilson, John Rosengrant, Enrico Damm, Robin Hackl, and Landis Fields.

== Selected filmography ==
- Total Recall (1990)
- Terminator 2: Judgment Day (1991)
- The Last of the Mohicans (1992)
- Last Action Hero (1993)
- True Lies (1994)
- Batman Forever (1995)
- Titanic (1997)
- End of Days (1999)
- A.I. Artificial Intelligence (2001)
- Men in Black II (2002)
- Minority Report (2002)
- Hulk (2003)
- Lemony Snicket's A Series of Unfortunate Events (2004)
- Van Helsing (2004)
- Pirates of the Caribbean: Dead Man's Chest (2006)
- Bedtime Stories (2008)
- Twilight (2008)
- Inception (2010)
- X-Men: First Class (2011)
- John Carter (2012)
- The Dark Knight Rises (2012)
- Fury (2014)
- Interstellar (2014)
- Suicide Squad (2016)
- Dunkirk (2017)
- Ad Astra (2019)
- Tenet (2020)
- Oppenheimer (2023)
- Twisters (2024)
- The Odyssey (2026)
