= Larry Dias =

Set decorator

- Occupation: Set decorator
- Years active: 1989-present

Larry Dias is a set decorator who was nominated at the 83rd Academy Awards for his work on the film Inception, this was in the category of Best Art Direction. His nomination was shared with Guy Hendrix Dyas and Doug Mowat.

He has done the sets on all of The Hunger Games films as well.

== Filmography ==
- Unstrung Heroes (1995)
- While You Were Sleeping (1995)
- Disney's The Kid (2000)
- One Night at McCool's (2001)
- America's Sweethearts (2001)
- Rat Race (2001)
- Tears of the Sun (2003)
- Pirates of the Caribbean: The Curse of the Black Pearl (2003)
- The Village (2004)
- Serenity (2005)
- Lady in the Water (2006)
- Transformers (2007)
- Indiana Jones and the Kingdom of the Crystal Skull (2008)
- Agora (2009)
- Inception (2010)
- The Last Airbender (2010)
- The Hunger Games (2012)
- Battleship (2012)
- The Hunger Games: Catching Fire (2013)
- The Hunger Games: Mockingjay – Part 1 (2014)
- The Hunger Games: Mockingjay - Part 2 (2015)
- Free State of Jones (2016)
- Mother! (2017)
- Rampage (2018)
- Venom (2018)
- Jungle Cruise (2021)
- Red Notice (2021)
- Black Adam (2022)
- The Color Purple (2023)
- The Odyssey (2026)
