= David Lee (visual effects artist) =

New Zealand visual effects supervisor

- Occupation: Visual effects supervisor

David Lee is a New Zealand visual effects supervisor. He won an Academy Award in the category Best Visual Effects for the film Tenet.

== Selected filmography ==
- Tenet (2020; co-won with Andrew Jackson, Andrew Lockley and Scott R. Fisher)
