= Doug Mowat (set decorator) =

- Education: AFI Conservatory
- Occupation: Set decorator
- Years active: 1986-present

Doug Mowat is a set decorator.

He was nominated for an Academy Award during the 83rd Academy Awards for the film Inception in the category of Best Art Direction. He shared his nomination with Guy Hendrix Dyas and Larry Dias. He graduated from the AFI Conservatory in 1984.
