= Andrew Lockley =

British visual effects supervisor

- Born: 5 May 1971 (age 54); Gosport, UK
- Other names: Andy Lockley
- Occupation: Visual effects Supervisor

Andrew Lockley (born 5 May 1971) is a British visual effects supervisor most known for working on most of Christopher Nolan's films.

He won at the 83rd Academy Awards for the film Inception in the category of Best Visual Effects. His win was shared with Peter Bebb, Chris Corbould and Paul Franklin. He won again at the 87th Academy Awards for the film Interstellar, along with Franklin, again for Best Visual Effects, with Ian Hunter, and Scott Fisher and again at the 93rd Academy Awards for Best Visual Effects, as one of several winners, for Christopher Nolan's Tenet (2020) with Andrew Jackson, David Lee, and Fisher.

He has also been nominated 5 times for the BAFTA Award for Best Special Visual Effects, winning on two occasions for the films Inception and Interstellar, with the other nominations being for The Dark Knight Rises, Dunkirk and Tenet.

== Selected filmography ==
- Tenet (2020)
- Venom (2018)
- Interstellar (2014)
- The Dark Knight Rises (2012)
- Captain America: The First Avenger (2011)
- Inception (2010)
- Prince of Persia: The Sands of Time (2010)
- The Dark Knight (2008)
- Children of Men (2006)
- Batman Begins (2005)
- Harry Potter and the Goblet of Fire (2005)
- Die Another Day (2002)
- Harry Potter and the Chamber of Secrets (2002)
