= Paul Franklin (visual effects supervisor) =

English visual effects supervisor

Paul Jason Franklin OBE is an English visual effects supervisor who has worked with visual effects since the 1990s. Franklin won the Academy Award for Best Visual Effects and the BAFTA Award for Best Special Visual Effects for Inception (2010), and won a second Academy Award for Best Visual Effects for Interstellar (2014). He shared the wins with Andrew Lockley, Peter Bebb, and Chris Corbould. Franklin has also been nominated for an Academy Award for The Dark Knight (2008). He was nominated for BAFTA Awards for Batman Begins, The Dark Knight (2008), and The Dark Knight Rises (2012).

== Background ==
Franklin was born in Congleton, and grew up in West Heath, a suburb of Congleton.

He was educated at Sandbach School in Cheshire from 1977 to 1984. He attended the South Cheshire College (Crewe), part of the former Mid Cheshire College in Northwich, for a year, and then gained a place at the Ruskin School of Art at Oxford University, where he was a member of St John's College, to study fine art.

At Oxford he had his first experience of filmmaking, frequently collaborating with director Ben Hopkins, and began to experiment with the emerging new medium of computer animation. He graduated in 1989. He worked two jobs as a videotape editor and then began a career in computer graphics and animation at Psygnosis (now Studio Liverpool) in the early 1990s.

After several years at the Moving Picture Company in London he and a group of colleagues founded the visual effects company Double Negative in 1998 with financing from PolyGram Filmed Entertainment. He headed the 3D effects for Double Negative's first film Pitch Black (2000).

Franklin was an undergraduate external examiner at Bournemouth University for 4 or 5 years and also gave visiting practitioner lectures at BU's Media School. In 2012, he received an honorary degree from Bournemouth.

Franklin was awarded an OBE in the 2026 Kings's Birthday Honours.

== Filmography ==
Franklin has been visual effects supervisor for the following films:

- Revelation (2001)
- Batman Begins (2005)
- Harry Potter and the Order of the Phoenix (2007)
- The Dark Knight (2008)
- Harry Potter and the Half-Blood Prince (2009)
- Inception (2010)
- The Dark Knight Rises (2012)
- Interstellar (2014)
- Venom (2018)
- Mission: Impossible – The Final Reckoning (2025)
- Narnia: The Magician's Nephew (2027)
