= Guy Hendrix Dyas =

British-American production designer

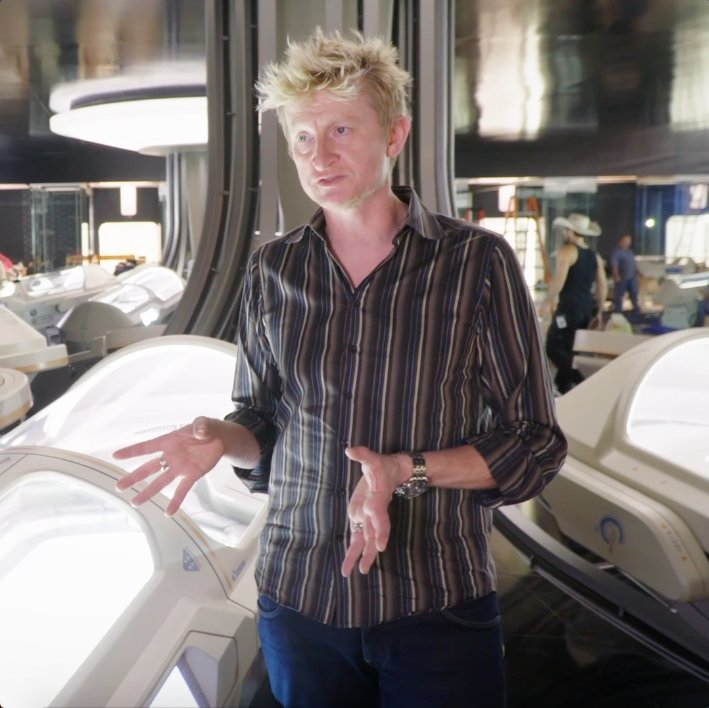
- Dyas on the set of Columbia Pictures Passengers
- Born: Guy Oliver Hendrix Dyas
- Occupations: Production designer Industrial design
- Spouse: Dominique Dyas (1997–present)
- Children: 2
- Website: www.guyhendrixdyas.com

Guy Hendrix Dyas is a British-American production designer known for his collaboration with directors such as Pablo Larraín, Danny Boyle, Christopher Nolan, Ang Lee and Steven Spielberg.

He grew up near Devon in the South of England and graduated with a master's degree in design from The Royal College of Art in London. His professional career started in Tokyo as an industrial designer, working for the Sony Corporation. He was hired by Sony after winning an international design competition for the next in their line of Walkman products. Dyas designed the winning entry, the yellow Walkman Sport.

== Selected filmography ==
- Masters of the Universe (2026) - Travis Knight
- Maria (2024) - Pablo Larraín
- Spencer (2021) - Pablo Larraín
- Lisey's Story (2021) - Pablo Larrain, J. J. Abrams and Stephen King
- Gemini Man (2019) - Ang Lee
- The Nutcracker and the Four Realms (2018) - Lasse Hallstrom and Joe Johnston
- Passengers (2016) - Morten Tyldum
- Steve Jobs (2015) - Danny Boyle
- Blackhat (2015) - Michael Mann
- Inception (2010) - Christopher Nolan
- Agora (2009) - Alejandro Amenabar
- Indiana Jones and the Kingdom of the Crystal Skull (2008) - Steven Spielberg
- Elizabeth: The Golden Age (2007) - Shekhar Kapur
- Superman Returns (2006) - Bryan Singer
- The Brothers Grimm (2005) - Terry Gilliam
- X2 (2003) - Bryan Singer

== Awards and nominations ==
- 2022: Nominated by the Hollywood Creative Alliance for Spencer
- 2017: Nominated for an Academy Award for Best Production Design for Passengers
- 2011: Nominated for an Academy Award for Best Production Design for Inception
- 2011: Winner of a BAFTA Award for Best Production Design for Inception
- 2008: Nominated for a BAFTA Award for Best Production Design for Elizabeth: The Golden Age
- 2017: Winner of an Art Directors Guild Award for a Contemporary Film for Passengers
- 2011: Winner of an Art Directors Guild Award for a Fantasy Film for Inception
- 2009: Nominated for an Art Directors Guild Award for a Fantasy Film for Indiana Jones and the Kingdom of the Crystal Skull
- 2008: Nominated for an Art Directors Guild Award for a Period Film for Elizabeth: The Golden Age
- 2007: Nominated for an Art Directors Guild for Superman Returns
- 2001: Nominated for an Art Directors Guild Award for The Cell
- 2011: Winner of a Critics' Choice Movie Awards for Best Production Design for Inception
- 2010: Winner of a Goya Awards for Best Production Supervision for Agora
- 2011: Winner of a Los Angeles Film Critics Association Award for Inception
- 2010: Winner of an American Film Institute Award for Inception
