= Chris Corbould =

British special effects coordinator

- Born: Christopher Charles Corbould; 1958 (age 66–67); United Kingdom
- Occupation: Special effects coordinator

Christopher Charles Corbould, OBE (/ˈkɔːrboʊld/; born 1958) is a British special effects coordinator best known for his work on major blockbuster films and the action scenes on 15 James Bond films since The Spy Who Loved Me. He has also worked extensively on the Superman and Batman film series on digital effects and stunts. Corbould has been awarded two Honorary Doctorates from Southampton Solent University in December 2009 and University of Hertfordshire in 2011. In 2011, he won the Academy Award for Best Visual Effects at the 83rd Academy Awards for his work on Inception. He is the brother of special effects supervisors Neil Corbould and Paul Corbould.

In March 2011, Corbould went on trial for breaching health and safety regulations regarding the death of stunt technician Conway Wickliffe during production of The Dark Knight in 2007. He was found not guilty, with the incident ruled as an accident.

Corbould was appointed Officer of the Order of the British Empire (OBE) in the 2014 New Year Honours for services to film.

In 2015, Corbould was credited with Guinness World Records for the "Largest film stunt explosion" ever in cinematic history for Spectre. In 2021, this was then surpassed once again by Corbould for No Time to Die, a total of 136.4 kg TNT was used.

== Special effects filmography ==
Year	Film	Role
1980	Saturn 3	special effects assistant
1980	Superman II	special effects technician (uncredited)
1981	Condorman	special effects technician
1983	Superman III	special effects senior technician
1983	Krull	special effects technician
1984	Supergirl	special effects technician
1985	A View to a Kill	special effects technician (uncredited)
1985	Lifeforce	special effects crew
1986	The Delta Force	special effects
1986	Link	senior special effects technician
1987	The Living Daylights	special effects
1988	Willow	senior special effects technician
1988	The Adventures of Baron Munchausen	special effects technician: UK (as Chris Cobould)
1989	Licence to Kill	special effects supervisor: second unit
1990	Nightbreed	special effects supervisor
1991	Highlander II: The Quickening	special effects floor supervisor (uncredited)
1991	Hudson Hawk	special effects technician
1992	Far and Away	special effects senior technician: Ireland
1992	Alien 3	senior special effects technician
1992	Chaplin	special effects technician: London
1993	Son of the Pink Panther	special effects senior technician
1993	The House of the Spirits	special effects technician
1993	Shadowlands	special effects supervisor
1994	Interview with the Vampire	special effects floor supervisor
1995	GoldenEye	special effects supervisor
1996	The Ghost and the Darkness	special effects supervisor
1997	Tomorrow Never Dies	special effects supervisor
1998	Firestorm	special effects coordinator
1999	The Mummy	special effects supervisor
1999	The World Is Not Enough	special effects supervisor
2000	102 Dalmatians	special effects coordinator
2001	Lara Croft: Tomb Raider	special effects supervisor
2002	Die Another Day	special effects supervisor
2003	Lara Croft: Tomb Raider – The Cradle of Life	special effects director
2005	Batman Begins	special effects coordinator
2006	Casino Royale	miniature effects supervisor, special effects supervisor
2008	The Dark Knight	Nominated for the Academy Award for Best Visual Effects
2008	Quantum of Solace	special effects coordinator
2010	Inception	Won the Academy Award for Best Visual Effects, BAFTA Award for Best Special Visual Effects and VES Award
2011	X-Men: First Class	special effects supervisor
2012	John Carter	special effects supervisor
2012	The Dark Knight Rises	special effects supervisor
2012	Skyfall	special effects supervisor and splinter unit second unit director
2015	Spectre	special effects supervisor - Guinness World Records for the "Largest film stunt explosion".
2015	Star Wars: The Force Awakens	Nominated for the Academy Award for Best Visual Effects
2017	Star Wars: The Last Jedi	Nominated for the Academy Award for Best Visual Effects
2018	Christopher Robin	Nominated for the Academy Award for Best Visual Effects
2021	No Time to Die	special effects supervisor Nominated for the Academy Award for Best Visual Effects
2022	Doctor Strange in the Multiverse of Madness	special effects supervisor and splinter unit second unit director

== Arms ==
Coat of arms of Chris Corbould

Crest
Within a Circlet of Guitar Necks and Headstocks the latter upwards Or stringed and pegged Argent a Pure Spanish Horse salient Argent unguled Or.
Escutcheon
Or a concentric Gurges dancetty throughout Vert over all two Loops of 35-millimetre Film one issuant in chief and in the dexter interlaced with one issuant in the sinister and in base proper.
Motto
Honesty, Integrity, Passion
