= Inception =

2010 film by Christopher Nolan

- Theatrical release poster
- Directed by: Christopher Nolan
- Written by: Christopher Nolan
- Produced by: Emma Thomas; Christopher Nolan
- Starring: Leonardo DiCaprio; Ken Watanabe; Joseph Gordon-Levitt; Marion Cotillard; Elliot Page (Note: Credited as Ellen Page; Page came out as transgender and changed his name in 2020.); Tom Hardy; Cillian Murphy; Tom Berenger; Michael Caine
- Cinematography: Wally Pfister
- Edited by: Lee Smith
- Music by: Hans Zimmer
- Production companies: Legendary Pictures; Syncopy
- Distributed by: Warner Bros. Pictures
- Release dates: July 8, 2010 (Odeon Leicester Square); July 16, 2010 (United States and United Kingdom)
- Running time: 148 minutes
- Countries: United States; United Kingdom
- Language: English
- Budget: $160 million
- Box office: $839 million

Inception is a 2010 science fiction heist film written and directed by Christopher Nolan, who also produced it with his wife Emma Thomas. The film stars Leonardo DiCaprio as a professional thief who steals information by infiltrating his targets' subconscious. He is offered a chance to have his criminal history erased as payment for implanting an idea into a target's subconscious. The ensemble cast includes Ken Watanabe, Joseph Gordon-Levitt, Marion Cotillard, Elliot Page, Tom Hardy, Cillian Murphy, Tom Berenger, Dileep Rao, and Michael Caine.

After the completion of Insomnia in 2002, Nolan presented to Warner Bros. a written 80-page treatment for a horror film envisioning "dream stealers", based on lucid dreaming. Deciding he needed more experience before tackling a production of this magnitude and complexity, Nolan shelved the project and instead worked on Batman Begins (2005), The Prestige (2006), and The Dark Knight (2008). The treatment was revised over six months and was purchased by Warner Bros. in February 2009. Inception was filmed in six countries, beginning in Tokyo on June 19 and ending in Canada on November 22. Its official budget was US$160 million, split between Warner Bros. and Legendary. Nolan's reputation and success with The Dark Knight helped secure the film's $100 million in advertising expenditure.

Inception's premiere was held in London on July 8, 2010; it was released in both conventional and IMAX theaters beginning on July 16, 2010. Inception grossed $839 million worldwide, becoming the fourth-highest-grossing film of 2010. Considered one of the best films of the 2010s, Inception, among its numerous accolades, won four Oscars (Best Cinematography, Best Sound Editing, Best Sound Mixing, Best Visual Effects) and was nominated for four more (Best Picture, Best Original Screenplay, Best Art Direction, Best Original Score) at the 83rd Academy Awards. In 2025, the Library of Congress selected Inception for preservation in the United States National Film Registry for being "culturally, historically or aesthetically significant".

== Plot ==
Dom Cobb and Arthur are professional thieves who perform corporate espionage using experimental dream-sharing technology to infiltrate their targets' subconscious and extract information. Their latest target Saito is impressed with Cobb's ability to layer multiple dreams within each other. He offers to hire Cobb for the ostensibly impossible job of performing "inception": implanting Robert Fischer, the son of Saito's competitor Maurice Fischer, with the idea to dissolve his father's conglomerate. In return, Saito promises to clear Cobb's criminal status, allowing him to return home to his children.

Cobb accepts the offer and recruits a forger named Eames, a chemist named Yusuf, and an architecture student named Ariadne. They devise a three-level dream structure in order for Robert to accept the implanted idea as his own. Ariadne is tasked with designing the architecture for all three levels, a task Cobb himself cannot do for fear of being sabotaged by his mind's projection of his late wife Mal. Due to time dilation with reality, time runs slower with each descending layer, with the dreamer on each staying behind to perform a music-synchronized "kick" that simultaneously awakens dreamers on all three levels.

Once Maurice Fischer dies, Saito buys the airline for Robert's commercial flight to America. The team sedates Robert into the first level, a raining city dreamt by Yusuf. They successfully abduct Robert, but discover that he is trained to anticipate such a scenario and has subconscious defensive projections; these projections attack, severely wounding Saito in the process. Cobb reveals that while dying in a dream usually awakens dreamers, Yusuf's sedatives will instead send them into "Limbo", a world of raw subconscious and extreme time dilation that is indistinguishable from reality. Eames impersonates Robert's godfather Peter Browning to introduce the idea of an alternate will to dissolve the company.

Cobb explains to Ariadne that he and Mal entered Limbo while experimenting with dream-sharing, experiencing fifty years in one night. After waking up, Mal still believed she was dreaming. Attempting to wake up, she committed suicide and framed Cobb for her murder to force him to do the same. Cobb fled the U.S., leaving his children behind.

Yusuf drives the team around the first level as they are sedated into the second level, a hotel dreamed by Arthur. Cobb persuades Robert that Browning has kidnapped him to stop the dissolution and that Cobb is a defensive projection. He leads Robert to the third level, an alpine fortress dreamt by Eames, as a ruse to enter Robert's subconscious.

In the third level, the team infiltrates the fortress with a projection of Maurice inside, where the inception itself can be performed. However, Yusuf performs his kick too soon by driving off a bridge, forcing Arthur and Eames to improvise a new set of kicks synchronized with them hitting the water by rigging an elevator and the fortress, respectively, with explosives. Mal then appears and kills Robert before he can be subjected to the inception; he and Saito are subsequently lost in Limbo, forcing Cobb and Ariadne to rescue them in time for Robert's inception and Eames's kick. Cobb reveals that during their time in Limbo, Mal refused to return to reality; Cobb had to convince her it was only a dream, accidentally incepting in her the belief that the real world was still a dream. Cobb makes peace with his role in Mal's death. Ariadne kills Mal's projection and wakes Robert up with a kick.

Revived into the third level, Robert discovers the planted idea: his dying father telling him to create something for himself. While Cobb searches for Saito in Limbo, the others ride the synced kicks back to reality. Cobb finds an aged Saito and reminds him of their agreement. All of the dreamers awaken on the plane, and Saito makes a phone call. Arriving in Los Angeles, Cobb passes the immigration checkpoint, and his father-in-law accompanies him to his home. Cobb uses a top that spins indefinitely in a dream to verify that he is in the real world, and reunites with his children before he can observe the result.

== Cast ==
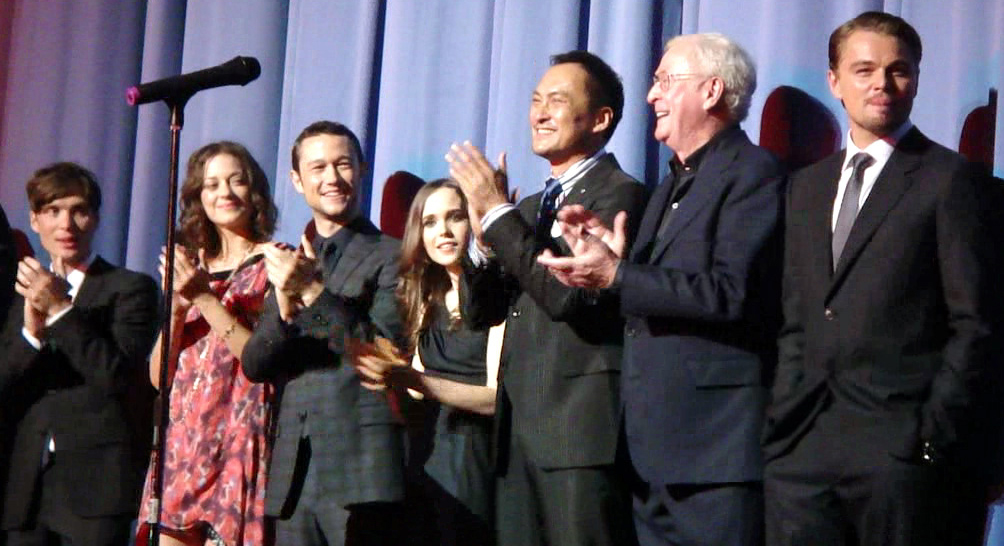
The cast at a premiere for the film in July 2010. From left to right: Cillian Murphy, Marion Cotillard, Joseph Gordon-Levitt, Elliot Page, Ken Watanabe, Michael Caine, and Leonardo DiCaprio

- Leonardo DiCaprio as Dom Cobb, a professional thief who specializes in conning secrets from his victims by infiltrating their dreams. DiCaprio was the first actor to be cast in the film. Brad Pitt and Will Smith were the first two choices and were offered the role, according to The Hollywood Reporter. Smith turned it down because he didn't understand it. Cobb's role is compared to "the haunted widower in a Gothic romance".
- Ken Watanabe as Saito, a Japanese businessman who employs Cobb for the team's mission. Nolan wrote the role with Watanabe in mind, as he wanted to work with him again after Batman Begins. Inception is Watanabe's first work in a contemporary setting where his primary language is English. Watanabe tried to emphasize a different characteristic of Saito in every dream level: "First chapter in my castle, I pick up some hidden feelings of the cycle. It's magical, powerful and then the first dream. And back to the second chapter, in the old hotel, I pick up [being] sharp and more calm and smart and it's a little bit [of a] different process to make up the character of any movie".
- Joseph Gordon-Levitt as Arthur, Cobb's partner who manages and researches the missions. Gordon-Levitt compared Arthur to the producer of Cobb's art, "the one saying, 'Okay, you have your vision; now I'm going to figure out how to make all the nuts and bolts work so you can do your thing'". The actor did all but one of his stunt scenes and said the preparation "was a challenge and it would have to be for it to look real". James Franco was in talks with Christopher Nolan to play Arthur, but was ultimately unavailable due to scheduling conflicts.
- Marion Cotillard as Mal, Cobb's deceased wife. She is a manifestation of Cobb's guilt about the real cause of Mal's suicide. He is unable to control these projections of her, challenging his abilities as an extractor. Nolan described Mal as "the essence of the femme fatale," and DiCaprio praised Cotillard's performance, saying that "she can be strong and vulnerable and hopeful and heartbreaking all in the same moment, which was perfect for all the contradictions of her character". Kate Winslet was offered the role but turned it down as she couldn't see herself in the role.
- Elliot Page as Ariadne, a graduate student of architecture who is recruited to construct the various dreamscapes, which are described as mazes. The name Ariadne alludes to a princess of Greek myth, daughter of King Minos, who aided the hero Theseus by giving him a sword and a ball of string to help him navigate the labyrinth which was the prison of the Minotaur. Nolan said that Page was chosen for being a "perfect combination of freshness and savvy and maturity" not common in people that age. Page said their character acts as a proxy to the audience, as "she's just learning about these ideas and, in essence, assists the audience in learning about dream sharing". The role was written with Evan Rachel Wood in mind, but she turned it down. Emily Blunt, Rachel McAdams, Taylor Swift, Emma Roberts, Jessy Schram, and Carey Mulligan were also considered before it went to Page.
- Tom Hardy as Eames, a sharp-tongued associate of Cobb. He is referred to as a fence but his specialty is forgery, more accurately identity theft. Eames uses his ability to impersonate others inside the dream world in order to manipulate Fischer. Hardy described his character as "an old, Graham Greene-type diplomat; sort of faded, shabby, grandeur—the old Shakespeare lovey mixed with somebody from Her Majesty's Special Forces", who wears "campy, old money" costumes.
- Cillian Murphy as Robert Fischer, the heir to a business empire and the team's target. Murphy said Fischer was portrayed as "a petulant child who's in need of a lot of attention from his father, he has everything he could ever want materially, but he's deeply lacking emotionally". The actor also researched the sons of Rupert Murdoch, "to add to that the idea of living in the shadow of someone so immensely powerful".
- Tom Berenger as Peter Browning, Robert Fischer's godfather and fellow executive at the Fischers' company. Berenger said Browning acts as a "surrogate father" to Fischer, who calls the character "Uncle Peter", and emphasized that "Browning has been with [Robert] his whole life and has probably spent more quality time with him than his own father".
- Michael Caine as Stephen Miles, Cobb's mentor and father-in-law, and Ariadne's college professor who recommends her to the team.
- Dileep Rao as Yusuf. Rao describes Yusuf as "an avant-garde pharmacologist, who is a resource for people, like Cobb, who want to do this work unsupervised, unregistered and unapproved of by anyone". Co-producer Jordan Goldberg said the role of the chemist was "particularly tough because you don't want him to seem like some kind of drug dealer", and that Rao was cast for being "funny, interesting and obviously smart".
- Lukas Haas as Nash, an architect in Cobb's employment who betrays the team and is later replaced by Ariadne.
- Talulah Riley as a woman, credited as "Blonde", whom Eames disguises himself as in a dream. Riley liked the role, despite it being minimal: "I get to wear a nice dress, pick up men in bars, and shove them in elevators. It was good to do something adultish. Usually I play 15-year-old English schoolgirls."
- Pete Postlethwaite as Maurice Fischer, Robert Fischer's father and the dying founder of a business empire.

== Production ==
=== Development ===
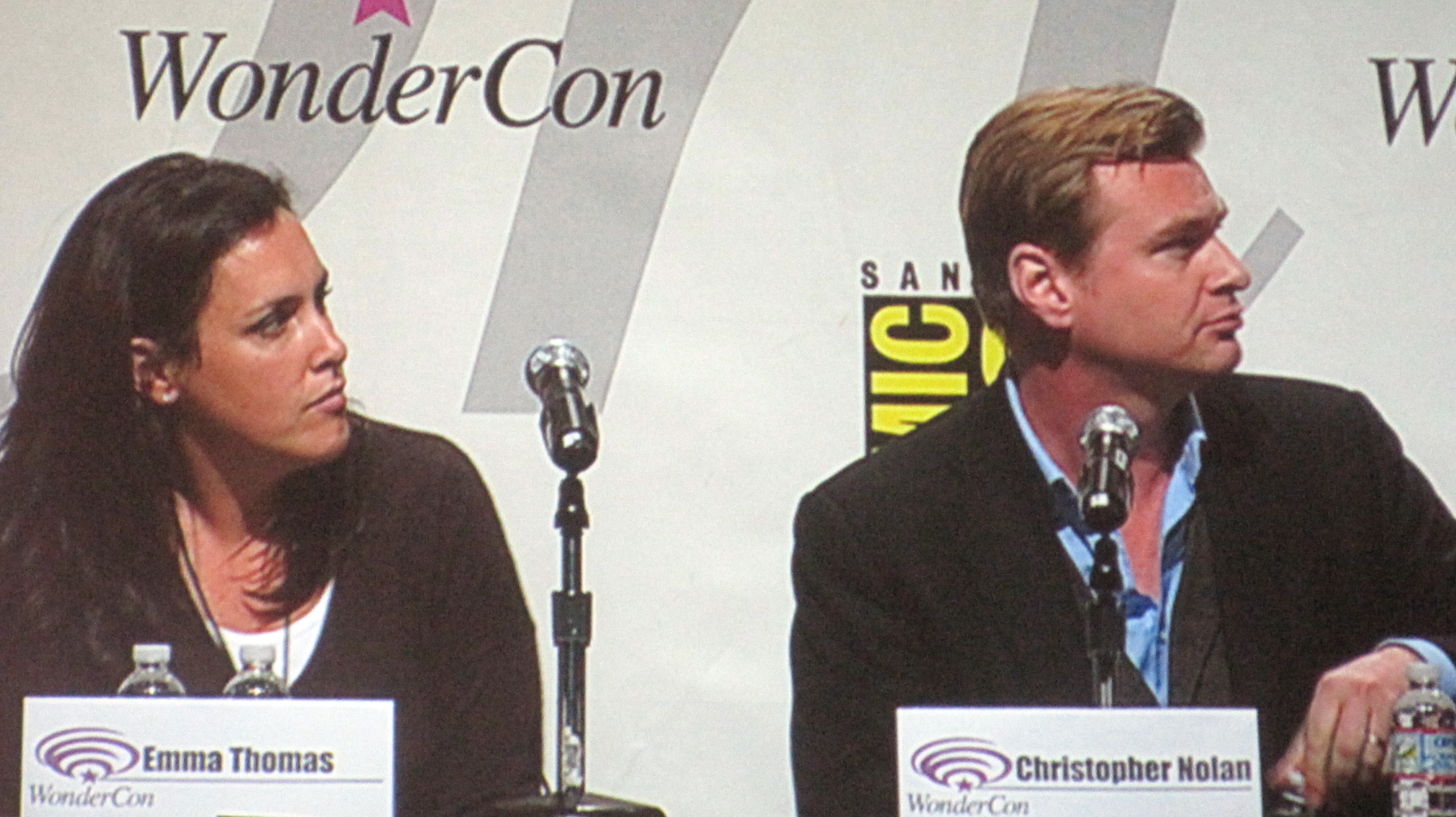
Emma Thomas and Christopher Nolan answer questions about Inception. The husband-and-wife team produced the film through their company Syncopy. Nolan also wrote and directed it.

Initially, Christopher Nolan wrote an 80-page treatment about dream-stealers. Nolan had originally envisioned Inception as a horror film, but eventually wrote it as a heist film even though he found that "traditionally [they] are very deliberately superficial in emotional terms." Upon revisiting his script, he decided that basing it in that genre did not work because the story "relies so heavily on the idea of the interior state, the idea of dream and memory. I realized I needed to raise the emotional stakes."

Nolan worked on the script for nine to ten years. When he first started thinking about making the film, Nolan was influenced by "that era of movies where you had The Matrix (1999), you had Dark City (1998), you had The Thirteenth Floor (1999) and, to a certain extent, you had Memento (2000), too. They were based in the principles that the world around you might not be real."

Nolan first pitched the film to Warner Bros. in 2001, but decided that he needed more experience making large-scale films and embarked on Batman Begins (2005) and The Dark Knight (2008). He soon realized that a film like Inception needed a large budget because "as soon as you're talking about dreams, the potential of the human mind is infinite. And so the scale of the film has to feel infinite. It has to feel like you could go anywhere by the end of the film. And it has to work on a massive scale." After making The Dark Knight, Nolan decided to make Inception and spent six months completing the script. Nolan said that the key to completing the script was wondering what would happen if several people shared the same dream. "Once you remove the privacy, you've created an infinite number of alternative universes in which people can meaningfully interact, with validity, with weight, with dramatic consequences."

Nolan had been trying to work with Leonardo DiCaprio for years and met him several times, but was unable to recruit him for any of his films until Inception. DiCaprio finally agreed because he was "intrigued by this concept—this dream-heist notion and how this character's going to unlock his dreamworld and ultimately affect his real life." He read the script and found it to be "very well written, comprehensive but you really had to have Chris in person, to try to articulate some of the things that have been swirling around his head for the last eight years." DiCaprio and Nolan spent months talking about the screenplay. Nolan took a long time re-writing the script in order "to make sure that the emotional journey of his [DiCaprio's] character was the driving force of the movie." On February 11, 2009, it was announced that Warner Bros. purchased Inception, a spec script written by Nolan.

=== Locations and sets ===
Principal photography began in Tokyo on June 19, 2009, with the scene in which Saito first hires Cobb during a helicopter flight over the city.

Excerpt of the scene, visualizing the rotation of full 360 degrees in a gravity effect while in a hotel scene dreamed by Arthur

The "gravity scene" was filmed using a rotating set.

The production moved to the United Kingdom and shot in a converted airship hangar in Cardington, Bedfordshire, north of London. There, the hotel bar set which tilted 30 degrees was built. A hotel corridor was also constructed by Guy Hendrix Dyas, the production designer, Chris Corbould, the special effects supervisor, and Wally Pfister, the director of photography; it rotated a full 360 degrees to create the effect of alternate directions of gravity for scenes set during the second level of dreaming, where dream-sector physics become chaotic. The idea was inspired by a technique used in Stanley Kubrick's 2001: A Space Odyssey (1968). Nolan said, "I was interested in taking those ideas, techniques, and philosophies and applying them to an action scenario". The filmmakers originally planned to make the hallway only 40 feet (12 m) long, but as the action sequence became more elaborate, the hallway's length was increased to 100 ft (30 m). The corridor was suspended along eight large concentric rings that were spaced equidistantly outside its walls and powered by two massive electric motors.

Joseph Gordon-Levitt, who plays Arthur, spent several weeks learning to fight in a corridor that spun like "a giant hamster wheel". Nolan said of the device, "It was like some incredible torture device; we thrashed Joseph for weeks, but in the end we looked at the footage, and it looks unlike anything any of us has seen before. The rhythm of it is unique, and when you watch it, even if you know how it was done, it confuses your perceptions. It's unsettling in a wonderful way". Gordon-Levitt remembered, "it was six-day weeks of just, like, coming home at night battered ... The light fixtures on the ceiling are coming around on the floor, and you have to choose the right time to cross through them, and if you don't, you're going to fall." On July 15, 2009, filming took place at University College London for the sequences occurring inside a Paris college of architecture in the story, including the library, Flaxman Gallery and Gustave Tuck Theatre.

Filming moved to France, where they shot Cobb entering the college of architecture (the place used for the entrance was the Musée Galliera) and the pivotal scenes between Ariadne and Cobb, in a bistro (a fictional one set up at the corner of Rue César Franck and Rue Bouchut), and lastly on the Bir-Hakeim bridge. For the explosion that takes place during the bistro scene, local authorities would not allow the use of real explosives. High-pressure nitrogen was used to create the effect of a series of explosions. Pfister used six high-speed cameras to capture the sequence from different angles and make sure that they got the shot. The visual effects department enhanced the sequence, adding more destruction and flying debris. For the "Paris folding" sequence and when Ariadne "creates" the bridges, green screen and CGI were used on location.

Tangier, Morocco, doubled as Mombasa, where Cobb hires Eames and Yusuf. A foot chase was shot in the streets and alleyways of the historic medina quarter. To capture this sequence, Pfister employed a mix of hand-held camera and steadicam work. Tangier was also used as the setting for filming an important riot scene during the initial foray into Saito's mind.

Filming moved to the Los Angeles area, where some sets were built on a Warner Bros. sound stage, including the interior rooms of Saito's Japanese castle (the exterior was done on a small set built in Malibu Beach). The dining room was inspired by the historic Nijō Castle, built around 1603. These sets were inspired by a mix of Japanese architecture and Western influences.

The production staged a multi-vehicle car chase on the streets of downtown Los Angeles, which involved a freight train crashing down the middle of a street. To do this, the filmmakers configured a train engine on the chassis of a tractor trailer. The replica was made from fiberglass molds taken from authentic train parts and matched in terms of color and design. Also, the car chase was supposed to be set in the midst of a downpour, but the L.A. weather stayed typically sunny. The filmmakers set up elaborate effects (e.g., rooftop water cannons) to give the audience the impression that the weather was overcast and soggy. L.A. was also the site of the climactic scene where a Ford Econoline van runs off the Schuyler Heim Bridge in slow motion. This sequence was filmed on and off for months, with the van being shot out of a cannon, according to actor Dileep Rao. Capturing the actors suspended within the van in slow motion took a whole day to film.

Once the van landed in the water, the challenge for the actors was to avoid panic. "And when they ask you to act, it's a bit of an ask," explained Cillian Murphy. The actors had to be underwater for four to five minutes while drawing air from scuba tanks; underwater buddy breathing is shown in this sequence.

The final phase of principal photography took place in Alberta in late November 2009. The location manager discovered a temporarily closed ski resort, Fortress Mountain. An elaborate set was assembled near the top station of the Canadian chairlift, taking three months to build. The production had to wait for a huge snowstorm, which eventually arrived. The ski-chase sequence was inspired by Nolan's favorite James Bond film, On Her Majesty's Secret Service (1969): "What I liked about it that we've tried to emulate in this film is there's a tremendous balance in that movie of action and scale and romanticism and tragedy and emotion."

=== Cinematography ===
The film was shot primarily in the anamorphic format on 35 mm film, with key sequences filmed on 65 mm, and aerial sequences in VistaVision. Nolan did not shoot any footage with IMAX cameras as he had with The Dark Knight. "We didn't feel that we were going to be able to shoot in IMAX because of the size of the cameras because this film, given that it deals with a potentially surreal area, the nature of dreams and so forth, I wanted it to be as realistic as possible. Not be bound by the scale of those IMAX cameras, even though I love the format dearly". In addition Nolan and Pfister tested using Showscan and Super Dimension 70 as potential large-format, high-frame-rate camera systems to use for the film, but ultimately decided against either format.

Sequences in slow motion were filmed on a Photo-Sonics 35 mm camera at speeds of up to 1,000 frames per second. Wally Pfister tested shooting some of these sequences using a high speed digital camera, but found the format to be too unreliable due to technical glitches. "Out of six times that we shot on the digital format, we only had one usable piece and it didn't end up in the film. Out of the six times we shot with the Photo-Sonics camera and 35 mm running through it, every single shot was in the movie."

Nolan also chose not to shoot any of the film in 3D as he prefers shooting on film using prime lenses, which is not possible with 3D cameras. Nolan has also criticized the dim image that 3D projection produces, and disputes that traditional film does not allow realistic depth perception, saying "I think it's a misnomer to call it 3D versus 2D. The whole point of cinematic imagery is it's three dimensional... You know 95% of our depth cues come from occlusion, resolution, color and so forth, so the idea of calling a 2D movie a '2D movie' is a little misleading." Nolan did test converting Inception into 3D in post-production but decided that, while it was possible, he lacked the time to complete the conversion to a standard he was happy with. In February 2011 Jonathan Liebesman suggested that Warner Bros. were attempting a 3D conversion for Blu-ray release.

Wally Pfister gave each location and dream level a distinctive look to aid the audience's recognition of the narrative's location during the heavily crosscut portion of the film: the mountain fortress appears sterile and cool, the hotel hallways have warm hues, and the scenes in the van are more neutral.

Nolan has said that the film "deals with levels of reality, and perceptions of reality which is something I'm very interested in. It's an action film set in a contemporary world, but with a slight science-fiction bent to it", while also describing it as "very much an ensemble film structured somewhat as a heist movie. It's an action adventure that spans the globe".

=== Visual effects ===
For dream sequences in Inception, Nolan used little CGI, preferring practical effects whenever possible. Nolan said, "It's always very important to me to do as much as possible in-camera, and then, if necessary, computer graphics are very useful to build on or enhance what you have achieved physically." To this end, visual effects supervisor Paul Franklin built miniatures of the mountain fortress set and then blew it up for the film. For the fight scene that takes place in zero gravity, he used CGI-based effects to "subtly bend elements like physics, space and time."

The most challenging effect was the "Limbo" city level at the end of the film, because it continually developed during production. Franklin had artists build concepts while Nolan expressed his ideal vision: "Something glacial, with clear modernist architecture, but with chunks of it breaking off into the sea like icebergs". Franklin and his team ended up with "something that looked like an iceberg version of Gotham City with water running through it." They created a basic model of a glacier and then designers created a program that added elements like roads, intersections and ravines until they had a complex, yet organic-looking, cityscape. For the Paris-folding sequence, Franklin had artists producing concept sketches and then they created rough computer animations to give them an idea of what the sequence looked like while in motion. Later during principal photography, Nolan was able to direct DiCaprio and Page based on this rough computer animation that Franklin had created. Inception had nearly 500 visual effects shots (in comparison, Batman Begins had approximately 620), which is relatively few in comparison to contemporary effects-heavy films, which can have as many as 2,000 visual effects shots.

== Music ==
The score for Inception was composed and arranged by Hans Zimmer, who described his work as "a very electronic, dense score", filled with "nostalgia and sadness" to match Cobb's feelings throughout the film. The music was written simultaneously to filming, and features a guitar sound reminiscent of Ennio Morricone, played by Johnny Marr, former guitarist of the Smiths. Édith Piaf's "Non, je ne regrette rien" ("No, I Regret Nothing") appears throughout the film, used to accurately time the dreams, and Zimmer reworked pieces of the song into cues of the score. A soundtrack album was released on July 11, 2010, by Reprise Records. The majority of the score was also included in high resolution 5.1 surround sound on the second disc of the two-disc Blu-ray release. Hans Zimmer's music was nominated for an Academy Award in the Best Original Score category in 2011, losing to Trent Reznor and Atticus Ross of The Social Network.

== Themes ==
=== Reality and dreams ===
Penrose stairs are incorporated into the film as an example of the impossible objects that can be created in lucid dream worlds.

In Inception, Nolan wanted to explore "the idea of people sharing a dream space... That gives you the ability to access somebody's unconscious mind. What would that be used and abused for?" The majority of the film's plot takes place in these interconnected dream worlds. This structure creates a framework where actions in the real or dream worlds ripple across others. The dream is always in a state of production, and shifts across the levels as the characters navigate it. By contrast, the world of The Matrix (1999) is an authoritarian, computer-controlled one, alluding to theories of social control developed by thinkers Michel Foucault and Jean Baudrillard. However, according to one interpretation Nolan's world has more in common with the works of Gilles Deleuze and Félix Guattari.

David Denby in The New Yorker compared Nolan's cinematic treatment of dreams to Luis Buñuel's in Belle de Jour (1967) and The Discreet Charm of the Bourgeoisie (1972). He criticized Nolan's "literal-minded" action level sequencing compared to Buñuel, who "silently pushed us into reveries and left us alone to enjoy our wonderment, but Nolan is working on so many levels of representation at once that he has to lay in pages of dialogue just to explain what's going on." The latter captures "the peculiar malign intensity of actual dreams."

Deirdre Barrett, a dream researcher at Harvard University, said that Nolan did not get every detail accurate regarding dreams, but their illogical, rambling, disjointed plots would not make for a great thriller anyway. However, "he did get many aspects right," she said, citing the scene in which a sleeping Cobb is shoved into a full bath, and in the dream world water gushes into the windows of the building, waking him up. "That's very much how real stimuli get incorporated, and you very often wake up right after that intrusion."

Nolan himself said, "I tried to work that idea of manipulation and management of a conscious dream being a skill that these people have. Really the script is based on those common, very basic experiences and concepts, and where can those take you? And the only outlandish idea that the film presents, really, is the existence of a technology that allows you to enter and share the same dream as someone else."

=== Dreams and cinema ===
Others have argued that the film is itself a metaphor for filmmaking, and that the filmgoing experience itself, images flashing before one's eyes in a darkened room, is akin to a dream. Writing in Wired, Jonah Lehrer supported this interpretation and presented neurological evidence that brain activity is strikingly similar during film-watching and sleeping. In both, the visual cortex is highly active and the prefrontal cortex, which deals with logic, deliberate analysis, and self-awareness, is quiet.

Paul argued that the experience of going to a picturehouse is itself an exercise in shared dreaming, particularly when viewing Inception: the film's sharp cutting between scenes forces the viewer to create larger narrative arcs to stitch the pieces together. This demand of production parallel to consumption of the images, on the part of the audience is analogous to dreaming itself. As in the film's story, in a cinema one enters into the space of another's dream, in this case Nolan's, as with any work of art, one's reading of it is ultimately influenced by one's own subjective desires and subconscious. At Bir-Hakeim bridge in Paris, Ariadne creates an illusion of infinity by adding facing mirrors underneath its struts, Stephanie Dreyfus in la Croix asked "Is this not a strong, beautiful metaphor for the cinema and its power of illusion?"

== Cinematic technique ==
=== Genre ===
Nolan combined elements from several different film genres into the film, notably science fiction, heist film, and film noir. Marion Cotillard plays "Mal" Cobb, Dom Cobb's projection of his guilt over his deceased wife's suicide. As the film's main antagonist, she is a frequent, malevolent presence in his dreams. Dom is unable to control these projections of her, challenging his abilities as an extractor. Nolan described Mal as "the essence of the femme fatale", the key noir reference in the film. As a "classic femme fatale" her relationship with Cobb is in his mind, a manifestation of Cobb's own neurosis and fear of how little he knows about the woman he loves. DiCaprio praised Cotillard's performance saying that "she can be strong and vulnerable and hopeful and heartbreaking all in the same moment, which was perfect for all the contradictions of her character".

Nolan began with the structure of a heist movie, since exposition is an essential element of that genre, though adapted it to have a greater emotional narrative suited to the world of dreams and subconscious. As Denby described this device: "the outer shell of the story is an elaborate caper". Kristin Thompson argued that exposition was a major formal device in the film. While a traditional heist movie has a heavy dose of exposition at the beginning as the team assembles and the leader explains the plan, in Inception this becomes nearly continuous as the group progresses through the various levels of dreaming. Three quarters of the film, until the van begins to fall from the bridge, are devoted to explaining its plot. In this way, exposition takes precedence over characterization. The characters' relationships are created by their respective skills and roles. Ariadne, like her ancient namesake, creates the maze and guides the others through it, but also helps Cobb navigate his own subconscious, and as the sole student of dream sharing, helps the audience understand the concept of the plot.

Nolan drew inspiration from the works of Jorge Luis Borges, including "The Secret Miracle" and "The Circular Ruins", and from the films Blade Runner (1982) and The Matrix (1999). While Nolan has not confirmed this, it has also been suggested by many observers that the movie draws heavy inspiration from the 2006 animated film Paprika.

=== Ending ===
The film cuts to the closing credits from a shot of the top apparently starting to show an ever so faint wobble, inviting speculation about whether the final sequence was reality or another dream. Nolan confirmed that the ambiguity was deliberate, saying, "I've been asked the question more times than I've ever been asked any other question about any other film I've made... What's funny to me is that people really do expect me to answer it." The film's script concludes with "Behind him, on the table, the spinning top is STILL SPINNING. And we—FADE OUT". Nolan said, "I put that cut there at the end, imposing an ambiguity from outside the film. That always felt the right ending to me—it always felt like the appropriate 'kick' to me... The real point of the scene—and this is what I tell people—is that Cobb isn't looking at the top. He's looking at his kids. He's left it behind. That's the emotional significance of the thing."

Caine interpreted the ending as meaning that Cobb is in the real world, quoting Nolan as telling him "'Well, when you're in the scene, it's reality.' So get that — if I'm in it, it's reality. If I'm not in it, it's a dream". While reiterating that he was uncomfortable with definitively explaining the scene, Nolan in 2023 credited Emma Thomas as providing "the correct answer, which is Leo's character ... doesn't care at that point". Mark Fisher argued that "a century of cultural theory" cautions against accepting the author's interpretation as anything more than a supplementary text, and this all the more so given the theme of the instability of any one master position in Nolan's films. Therein the manipulator is often the one who ends up manipulated, and Cobb's "not caring" about whether or not his world is real may be the price of his happiness and release.

== Release ==
=== Marketing ===
Warner Bros. spent US$100 million marketing the film. Although Inception was not part of an existing franchise, Sue Kroll, president of Warner's worldwide marketing, said the company believed it could gain awareness due to the strength of "Christopher Nolan as a brand". Kroll declared that "We don't have the brand equity that usually drives a big summer opening, but we have a great cast and a fresh idea from a filmmaker with a track record of making incredible movies. If you can't make those elements work, it's a sad day." The studio also tried to maintain a campaign of secrecy—as reported by the Senior VP of Interactive Marketing, Michael Tritter, "You have this movie which is going to have a pretty big built in fanbase... but you also have a movie that you are trying to keep very secret. Chris [Nolan] really likes people to see his movies in a theater and not see it all beforehand so everything that you do to market that—at least early on—is with an eye to feeding the interest to fans."

A viral marketing campaign was employed for the film. After the revelation of the first teaser trailer, in August 2009, the film's official website featured only an animation of Cobb's spinning top. In December, the top toppled over and the website opened the online game Mind Crime, which upon completion revealed Inception's poster. The rest of the campaign unrolled after WonderCon in April 2010, where Warner gave away promotional T-shirts featuring the PASIV briefcase used to create the dream space, and had a QR code linking to an online manual of the device. Mind Crime also received a stage 2 with more resources, including a hidden trailer for the movie. More pieces of viral marketing began to surface before Inception's release, such as a manual filled with bizarre images and text sent to Wired magazine, and the online publication of posters, ads, phone applications, and strange websites all related to the film. Warner also released an online prequel comic, Inception: The Cobol Job.

The official trailer released on May 10, 2010, through Mind Game was extremely well received. It featured an original piece of music, "Mind Heist", by recording artist Zack Hemsey, rather than music from the score. The trailer quickly went viral with numerous mashups copying its style, both by amateurs on sites like YouTube and by professionals on sites such as CollegeHumor. On June 7, 2010, a behind-the-scenes featurette on the film was released in HD on Yahoo! Movies.

Inception and its film trailers are widely credited for launching the trend throughout the 2010s in which blockbuster movie trailers repeatedly hit audiences with so-called "braam" sounds: "bassy, brassy, thunderous notes—like a foghorn on steroids—meant to impart a sense of apocalyptic momentousness". However, different composers worked on the teaser trailer, first trailer, second trailer, and film score, meaning that identifying the composer(s) responsible for that trend is a complicated task.

=== Home media ===
Inception was released on DVD and Blu-ray on December 3, 2010, in France, and the week after in the United Kingdom and United States (December 7, 2010). The film was released on VHS in South Korea, making it one of the last major studio films released for the format. Warner Bros. also made available in the United States a limited Blu-ray edition packaged in a metal replica of the PASIV briefcase, which included extras such as a metal replica of the spinning top totem. With a production run of less than 2,000, it sold out in one weekend. Inception was released on 4K Blu-ray and digital copy along with other Christopher Nolan films on December 19, 2017. As of 2018, the home video releases have sold over 9 million units and grossed over $160 million.

=== Putative video game ===
In a November 2010 interview, Nolan expressed his intention to develop a video game set in the Inception world, working with a team of collaborators. He described it as "a longer-term proposition", referring to the medium of video games as "something I've wanted to explore".

=== 10th anniversary re-release ===
Inception was re-released in theaters for its tenth anniversary, starting on August 12, 2020, in international markets and on August 21 in the U.S. The re-release was originally announced by Warner Bros. in June 2020 and scheduled for July 17, 2020, taking the original release date for Nolan's upcoming film Tenet after its delay to July 31 due to the impact of the COVID-19 pandemic on movie theaters. After Tenet was delayed again to August 12, the re-release was shifted to July 31, before setting on the August release date following a third delay.

== Reception ==
=== Box office ===
| Film | Release date | Box office revenue | | | Box office ranking | | Budget | Reference |
| Film | United States | North America | International | Worldwide | All-time domestic | All-time worldwide | Budget | Reference |
|---|---|---|---|---|---|---|---|---|
| Inception | July 2010 | US$292,587,330 | US$578,205,319 | US$839,030,630 | No. 109 | No. 80 | US$160,000,000 | |

Inception was released in both conventional and IMAX theaters on July 16, 2010. The film had its world premiere at Leicester Square in London on July 8, 2010. In the United States and Canada, Inception was released theatrically in 3,792 conventional theaters and 195 IMAX theaters. The film grossed US$21.8 million during its opening day on July 16, 2010, with midnight screenings in 1,500 locations. Overall the film made US$62.7 million and debuted at No.1 on its opening weekend. Inception's opening weekend gross made it the second-highest-grossing debut for a science fiction film that was not a sequel, remake or adaptation, behind Avatar's US$77 million opening-weekend gross in 2009. The film held the top spot of the box office rankings in its second and third weekends, with drops of just 32% (US$42.7 million) and 36% (US$27.5 million), respectively, before dropping to second place in its fourth week, behind The Other Guys.

Inception initially grossed US$292 million in the United States and Canada, US$56 million in the United Kingdom, Ireland and Malta and US$479 million in other countries for a total of US$828 million worldwide. Its five highest-grossing markets after the US and Canada (US$292 million) were China (US$68 million), the United Kingdom, Ireland and Malta (US$56 million), France and the Maghreb region (US$43 million), Japan (US$40 million) and South Korea (US$38 million). It was the sixth-highest-grossing film of 2010 in North America, and the fourth-highest-grossing film of 2010, behind Toy Story 3, Alice in Wonderland and Harry Potter and the Deathly Hallows – Part 1. Its subsequent re-releases increased its gross to US$839 million. Inception is the fourth most lucrative production in Christopher Nolan's career—behind The Dark Knight, The Dark Knight Rises and Oppenheimer—and the second most for Leonardo DiCaprio—behind Titanic.

=== Critical response ===
On Rotten Tomatoes, Inception holds an approval rating of 87% based on 363 reviews, with an average rating of 8.40/10. The website's critical consensus reads: "Smart, innovative, and thrilling, Inception is that rare summer blockbuster that succeeds viscerally as well as intellectually." Metacritic, another review aggregator, assigned the film a weighted average score of 74 out of 100, based on 42 critics, indicating "generally favorable" reviews. Audiences polled by CinemaScore gave the film an average grade of "B+" on an A+ to F scale.

Peter Travers of Rolling Stone called Inception a "wildly ingenious chess game," and concluded "the result is a knockout." Justin Chang of Variety praised the film as "a conceptual tour de force" and wrote, "applying a vivid sense of procedural detail to a fiendishly intricate yarn set in the labyrinth of the unconscious mind, the writer-director has devised a heist thriller for surrealists, a Jungian's Rififi, that challenges viewers to sift through multiple layers of (un)reality." Jim Vejvoda of IGN rated the film as perfect, deeming it "a singular accomplishment from a filmmaker who has only gotten better with each film." Relevant's David Roark called it Nolan's "greatest accomplishment", saying, "Visually, intellectually and emotionally, Inception is a masterpiece."

In its August 2010 issue, Empire gave the film a full five stars and wrote, "it feels like Stanley Kubrick adapting the work of the great sci-fi author William Gibson [...] Nolan delivers another true original: welcome to an undiscovered country." Entertainment Weekly's Lisa Schwarzbaum gave the film a B+ grade and wrote, "It's a rolling explosion of images as hypnotizing and sharply angled as any in a drawing by M. C. Escher or a state-of-the-biz video game; the backwards splicing of Nolan's own Memento looks rudimentary by comparison." Roger Ebert of the Chicago Sun-Times awarded the film a full four stars and said that Inception "is all about process, about fighting our way through enveloping sheets of reality and dream, reality within dreams, dreams without reality. It's a breathtaking juggling act." Richard Roeper, also of the Sun-Times, gave Inception an "A+" score and called it "one of the best movies of the [21st] century." BBC Radio 5 Live's Mark Kermode named Inception as the best film of 2010, stating that "Inception is proof that people are not stupid, that cinema is not trash, and that it is possible for blockbusters and art to be the same thing."

Michael Phillips of the Chicago Tribune gave the film 3 out of 4 stars and wrote, "I found myself wishing Inception were weirder, further out [...] the film is Nolan's labyrinth all the way, and it's gratifying to experience a summer movie with large visual ambitions and with nothing more or less on its mind than (as Shakespeare said) a dream that hath no bottom." Time's Richard Corliss wrote that the film's "noble intent is to implant one man's vision in the mind of a vast audience [...] The idea of movie going as communal dreaming is a century old. With Inception, viewers have a chance to see that notion get a state-of-the-art update." Kenneth Turan of the Los Angeles Times felt that Nolan was able to blend "the best of traditional and modern film making. If you're searching for smart and nervy popular entertainment, this is what it looks like." USA Today's Claudia Puig gave the film three-and-a-half out of four stars and felt that Nolan "regards his viewers as possibly smarter than they are—or at least as capable of rising to his inventive level. That's a tall order. But it's refreshing to find a director who makes us stretch, even occasionally struggle, to keep up."

Not all reviewers gave the film positive reviews. New York magazine's David Edelstein said in his review that he had "no idea what so many people are raving about. It's as if someone went into their heads while they were sleeping and planted the idea that Inception is a visionary masterpiece and—hold on ... Whoa! I think I get it. The movie is a metaphor for the power of delusional hype—a metaphor for itself." The New York Observer's Rex Reed said the film's development was "pretty much what we've come to expect from summer movies in general and Christopher Nolan movies in particular ... [it] doesn't seem like much of an accomplishment to me." A. O. Scott of The New York Times commented "there is a lot to see in Inception, there is nothing that counts as genuine vision. Mr. Nolan's idea of the mind is too literal, too logical, and too rule-bound to allow the full measure of madness." The New Yorker's David Denby considered the film to be "not nearly as much fun as Nolan imagined it to be", concluding that "Inception is a stunning-looking film that gets lost in fabulous intricacies, a movie devoted to its own workings and to little else."

While some critics have tended to view the film as perfectly straightforward, and even criticize its overarching themes as "the stuff of torpid platitudes", online discussion has been much more positive. Heated debate has centered on the ambiguity of the ending, with many critics like Devin Faraci making the case that the film is self-referential and tongue-in-cheek, both a film about film-making and a dream about dreams. Yet other critics, such as Kristin Thompson, see less value in the ambiguous ending of the film and more in its structure and novel method of storytelling, highlighting Inception as a new form of narrative that revels in "continuous exposition".

Several critics and scholars have noted the film has many striking similarities to the 2006 anime film Paprika by Satoshi Kon (and Yasutaka Tsutsui's 1993 novel of the same name), including plot similarities, similar scenes, and similar characters, arguing that Inception was influenced by Paprika. Several sources have also noted plot similarities between the film and the 2002 Uncle Scrooge comic The Dream of a Lifetime by Don Rosa. The influence of Andrei Tarkovsky's Solaris on Inception was noted as well.

=== Year-end and all-time lists ===
Inception appeared on over 273 critics' lists of the top ten films of 2010, being picked as number-one on at least 55 of those lists. It was the second-most-mentioned film in both the top ten lists and number-one rankings, only behind The Social Network along with Toy Story 3, True Grit, The King's Speech, and Black Swan as the most critically acclaimed films of 2010. Author Stephen King placed Inception at No. 3 in his list of top 10 best films of the year. Film maker Denis Villeneuve cited it as among his favorite films of all time. In 2025, the film ranked number 55 on The New York Times' list of "The 100 Best Movies of the 21st Century" and number 24 on the "Readers' Choice" edition of the list.

Critics and publications who ranked the film first for that year included Richard Roeper of the Chicago Sun-Times, Kenneth Turan of the Los Angeles Times (tied with The Social Network and Toy Story 3), Tasha Robinson of The A.V. Club, Empire magazine, and Kirk Honeycutt of The Hollywood Reporter.

=== Top ten lists ===
Inception was listed on many critics' lists of top ten movies for 2010.

- 1st – Richard Roeper, Chicago Sun-Times
- 1st – Kenneth Turan, Los Angeles Times (tied with The Social Network and Toy Story 3)
- 1st – Tasha Robinson, The A.V. Club
- 1st – Empire
- 1st – Kirk Honeycutt, The Hollywood Reporter
- 2nd – Peter Travers, Rolling Stone
- 2nd – Christy Lemire, Associated Press
- 2nd – Gregory Ellwood, HitFix
- 2nd – Lisa Kennedy, Denver Post
- 2nd – Bill Goodykoontz, Arizona Republic
- 3rd – Stephen Holden, The New York Times
- 3rd – Phillip French, The Observer
- 3rd – FX Feeney, The Village Voice
- 4th – Keith Phipps, The A.V. Club
- 5th – Nathan Rabin, The A.V. Club
- 5th – Lou Lumenick, New York Post
- 6th – Roger Ebert, Chicago Sun-Times
- 6th – Elizabeth Weitzman, New York Daily News
- 6th – Ann Hornaday, Washington Post
- 6th – Caryn James, Indiewire
- 6th – Claudia Puig, USA Today
- 6th – David Germain, Associated Press
- 6th – Rene Rodriguez, Miami Herald
- 7th – Noel Murray, The A.V. Club
- 8th – Mike Scott, The Times-Picayune
- 9th – Drew McWeeny, HitFix
- 10th – J. Hoberman, The Village Voice
- 10th – Peter Hartlaub, San Francisco Chronicle

In March 2011, the film was voted by BBC Radio 1 and BBC Radio 1Xtra listeners as their ninth-favorite film of all time. Producer Roger Corman cited Inception as an example of "great imagination and originality". In 2012, Inception was ranked the 35th-best-edited film of all time by the Motion Picture Editors Guild. In the same year, Total Film named it the most rewatchable movie of all time. In 2014, Empire ranked Inception the tenth-greatest film ever made on their list of "The 301 Greatest Movies Of All Time" as voted by the magazine's readers, while Rolling Stone magazine named it the second-best science fiction film since the turn of the century. Inception was ranked 84th on Hollywood's 100 Favorite Films, a list compiled by The Hollywood Reporter in 2014, surveying "Studio chiefs, Oscar winners and TV royalty". In 2016, Inception was voted the 51st-best film of the 21st Century by BBC, as picked by 177 film critics from around the world. The film was included in the Visual Effects Society's list of "The Most Influential Visual Effects Films of All Time". In 2019, Total Film named Inception the best film of the 2010s. Many critics and media outlets included Inception in their rankings of the best films of the 2010s. The film was included in Forbes magazine's list of Top 150 Greatest Films of 21st Century.

In April 2014, The Daily Telegraph placed the title on its top ten list of the most overrated films. Telegraph's Tim Robey stated, "It's a criminal failing of the movie that it purports to be about people's dreams being invaded, but demonstrates no instinct at all for what a dream has ever felt like, and no flair for making us feel like we're in one, at any point." The film won an informal poll by the Los Angeles Times as the most overrated movie of 2010. In 2021, members of Writers Guild of America West (WGAW) and Writers Guild of America, East (WGAE) ranked its screenplay 37th in WGA's 101 Greatest Screenplays of the 21st Century (So Far).

In 2026, Inception was selected for preservation in the United States National Film Registry by the Library of Congress as being "culturally, historically, or aesthetically significant".

== Accolades ==
The film won many awards in technical categories, such as Academy Awards for Best Cinematography, Best Sound Editing, Best Sound Mixing, and Best Visual Effects, and the British Academy Film Awards for Best Production Design, Best Special Visual Effects and Best Sound. In most of its artistic nominations, such as Film, Director, and Screenplay at the Oscars, BAFTAs and Golden Globes, the film was defeated by The Social Network or The King's Speech. However, the film did win the two highest honors for a science fiction or fantasy film: the 2011 Bradbury Award for best dramatic production and the 2011 Hugo Award for Best Dramatic Presentation (Long Form).

== In popular culture ==
Numerous pop and hip hop songs reference the film, including Common's "Blue Sky", N.E.R.D.'s "Hypnotize U", XV's "The Kick", Black Eyed Peas' "Just Can't Get Enough", Lil Wayne's "6 Foot 7 Foot", Jennifer Lopez's "On the Floor", and B.o.B's "Strange Clouds", while T.I. had Inception-based artwork on two of his mix-tapes. An instrumental track by Joe Budden is titled "Inception". The animated series South Park parodies the film in the show's tenth episode of its fourteenth season, titled "Insheeption". The film was also an influence for Ariana Grande's video for "No Tears Left to Cry". "Lawnmower Dog", the second episode of the animated comedy show Rick and Morty, parodied the film. In an episode of The Simpsons, named "How I Wet Your Mother", the plot spoofs Inception with various scenes parodying moments from the film. The showrunners of the television series The Flash said its season 4 finale was inspired by Inception. In February 2020, American singer-songwriter Taylor Swift released a lyric video for her single "The Man", which featured visuals bearing resemblance to the film. The song also mentions DiCaprio in its lyrics. Kpop boy group Ateez, also released a song titled "Inception" in 2020, serving as their title track for their fifth EP, Zero: Fever Part.1. The song is heavily inspired by Nolan's film, with the concept, music video and lyrics containing references to core concepts of "dream in a dream" and distorted realities that are present in the film.

The film's title has been colloquialized as the word inception and the splinter suffix -ception, which refer to layering, nesting, or recursion, in reference to the movie's key element of a "dream within a dream". The normal meaning of inception is 'beginning', and the title refers to causing the inception of an idea within someone's mind.

== See also ==
- Dreamscape (1984 film)
- Existenz (1999 film)
- False awakening
- ForeverSpin
- Simulacrum
- Simulation hypothesis
- Solipsism
- Suggestion
- The Three Stigmata of Palmer Eldritch (1965 novel)
