= Saturn Award for Best Special Effects =

Award for special effects

Saturn Award for Best Special / Visual Effects
- Awarded for: Best special effects and visual effects of the year for a genre film
- Country: United States
- Presented by: Academy of Science Fiction, Fantasy and Horror Films
- First award: 1975
- Currently held by: Avatar: Fire and Ash (2024/2025)
- Website: www.saturnawards.org

The Saturn Award for Best Special / Visual Effects is one of the annual awards given by the Academy of Science Fiction, Fantasy and Horror Films. The Saturn Awards, which are the oldest film-specialized awards to reward science fiction, fantasy, and horror achievements (the Hugo Award for Best Dramatic Presentation is the oldest award for science fiction and fantasy films), included the category for the first time at the 2nd Saturn Awards in 1975.

== Winners and nominees ==
=== 1970s ===
Year	Recipients	Film
1973 (2nd)	Marcel Vercoutere	The Exorcist
1974/1975 (3rd)
1974/1975 (3rd)	Douglas Knapp, Bill Taylor, John Carpenter, Dan O'Bannon	Dark Star
1976 (4th)
1976 (4th)	L. B. Abbott (for his career)	
1977 (5th)
1977 (5th)	John Dykstra, John Stears	Star Wars
1977 (5th)	Douglas Trumbull	Close Encounters of the Third Kind
1977 (5th)	Albert Whitlock, Chuck Gaspar (Van der Veer Photo Effects)	Exorcist II: The Heretic
1977 (5th)	Ray Harryhausen	Sinbad and the Eye of the Tiger
1978 (6th)	Colin Chilvers	Superman
1978 (6th)	Henry Millar (Van der Veer Photo Effects)	Capricorn One
1978 (6th)	Ira Anderson Jr.	Damien: Omen II
1978 (6th)	Dell Rheaume, Russel Hessey	Invasion of the Body Snatchers
1978 (6th)	Albert Whitlock	The Wiz
1979 (7th)	Douglas Trumbull, John Dykstra, Richard Yuricich	Star Trek: The Motion Picture
1979 (7th)	Brian Johnson, Nick Allder	Alien
1979 (7th)	Peter Ellenshaw	The Black Hole
1979 (7th)	John Evans, John Richardson	Moonraker
1979 (7th)	Robbie Knott	The Muppet Movie

=== 1980s ===
Year	Recipients	Film
1980 (8th)	Brian Johnson, Richard Edlund	The Empire Strikes Back
1980 (8th)	Chuck Comisky	Battle Beyond the Stars
1980 (8th)	Richard Albain Jr., Tommy Lee Wallace, James F. Liles	The Fog
1980 (8th)	Dave Allen, Peter Kuran	The Howling
1980 (8th)	Gary Zeller	Scanners
1981 (9th)	Richard Edlund	Raiders of the Lost Ark
1981 (9th)	Ray Harryhausen	Clash of the Titans
1981 (9th)	Brian Johnson, Dennis Muren	Dragonslayer
1981 (9th)	John Stears	Outland
1981 (9th)	Jon Bunker	Time Bandits
1982 (10th)	Carlo Rambaldi, Dennis Muren	E.T. the Extra-Terrestrial
1982 (10th)	Douglas Trumbull, Richard Yuricich	Blade Runner
1982 (10th)	Roy Field, Brian Smithies	The Dark Crystal
1982 (10th)	Tom Campbell, William T. Conway, John Carl Buechler, Steve Neill	Forbidden World
1982 (10th)	Rob Bottin	The Thing
1983 (11th)	Richard Edlund, Dennis Muren, Ken Ralston	Return of the Jedi
1983 (11th)	(Entertainment Effects Group)	Brainstorm
1983 (11th)	Ian Wingrove	Never Say Never Again
1983 (11th)	Lee Dyer	Something Wicked This Way Comes
1983 (11th)	Chuck Comisky, Kenneth Jones, Lawrence E. Benson (Private Stock Effects Inc.)	Strange Invaders
1984 (12th)	Chris Walas	Gremlins
1984 (12th)	Richard Edlund	2010
1984 (12th)	Lawrence E. Benson	Creature
1984 (12th)	Barry Nolan	Dune
1984 (12th)	Ralph Winter	Star Trek III: The Search for Spock
1985 (13th)	Kevin Pike	Back to the Future
1985 (13th)	(The L.A. Effects Group)	Commando
1985 (13th)	Bruce Nicholson, Ralph Winter	Explorers
1985 (13th)	Richard Edlund	Fright Night
1985 (13th)	(Apogee)	Lifeforce
1986 (14th)	Stan Winston, Robert Skotak, Dennis Skotak (The L.A. Effects Group)	Aliens
1986 (14th)	Lyle Conway	Little Shop of Horrors
1986 (14th)	Richard Edlund	Poltergeist II: The Other Side
1986 (14th)	Syd Mead, Eric Allard	Short Circuit
1986 (14th)	Ken Ralston, Michael Lantieri	Star Trek IV: The Voyage Home
1987 (15th)	Peter Kuran, Phil Tippett, Rob Bottin, Rocco Gioffre	RoboCop
1987 (15th)	Vern Hyde, Doug Beswick, Tom Sullivan	Evil Dead II
1987 (15th)	Dennis Muren, Bill George, Harley Jessup, Kenneth Smith	Innerspace
1987 (15th)	Richard Edlund	Masters of the Universe
1987 (15th)	Joel Hynek, Stan Winston, Richard Greenberg, Robert M. Greenberg	Predator
1987 (15th)	Michael Lantieri (Industrial Light & Magic)	The Witches of Eastwick
1988 (16th)	George Gibbs, Ken Ralston, Richard Williams (Industrial Light & Magic)	Who Framed Roger Rabbit
1988 (16th)	Peter Kuran, Alan Munro, Ted Rae, Robert Short	Beetlejuice
1988 (16th)	Kevin Pike, Hoyt Yeatman, Will Vinton	Moonwalker
1988 (16th)	Eric Brevig, Allen Hall (Dream Quest Images)	Scrooged
1988 (16th)	Eric Allard, Jeff Jarvis	Short Circuit 2
1988 (16th)	John Richardson (Industrial Light & Magic)	Willow
1989/1990 (17th)	Ken Ralston (Industrial Light & Magic)	Back to the Future Part II
1989/1990 (17th)	(Industrial Light & Magic, Dream Quest Images, Fantasy II Film Effects, Wonderworks)	The Abyss
1989/1990 (17th)	Richard Conway, Kent Houston	The Adventures of Baron Munchausen
1989/1990 (17th)	Bruce Nicholson, John T. Van Vliet, Richard Edlund, Laura Buff	Ghost
1989/1990 (17th)	Rick Baker, Ken Pepiot, Dennis Michelson	Gremlins 2: The New Batch
1989/1990 (17th)	Rick Fichter, David Sosalla, Peter Chesney	Honey, I Shrunk the Kids
1989/1990 (17th)	Phil Tippett, Rob Bottin, Peter Kuran	RoboCop 2
1989/1990 (17th)	Thomas L. Fisher, Eric Brevig, Rob Bottin (Dream Quest Images, Industrial Light & Magic, Stetson Visual Services Inc.)	Total Recall
1989/1990 (17th)	Tom Woodruff Jr., Alec Gillis (4-Ward Productions, Illusion Arts Inc., Fantasy II Film Effects)	Tremors

=== 1990s ===
Year	Recipients	Film
1991 (18th)	Stan Winston (Industrial Light & Magic, Fantasy II Film Effects, 4-Ward Productions)	Terminator 2: Judgment Day
1991 (18th)	Richard Yuricich, Kevin Yagher (Video Image)	Bill & Ted's Bogus Journey
1991 (18th)	Syd Dutton, Bill Taylor, Gene Warren Jr. (Illusion Arts Inc.)	Frankenstein Unbound
1991 (18th)	Stan Winston, Joel Hynek (R/Greenberg Associates Inc.)	Predator 2
1991 (18th)	Ken Ralston (Industrial Light & Magic)	The Rocketeer
1991 (18th)	(Perpetual Motion Pictures, Dream Quest Images)	Warlock
1992 (19th)	Ken Ralston, Tom Woodruff Jr., Alec Gillis (Industrial Light & Magic)	Death Becomes Her
1992 (19th)	Alan Munro (Visual Concept Engineering (VCE), Alterian, Inc., David Miller Creations)	The Addams Family
1992 (19th)	George Gibbs, Richard Edlund, Alec Gillis, Tom Woodruff Jr.	Alien 3
1992 (19th)	Richard Taylor, Bob McCarron	Braindead (Dead Alive)
1992 (19th)	Roman Coppola	Bram Stoker's Dracula
1992 (19th)	Frank Ceglia, Paul Haines, Tom Ceglia	The Lawnmower Man
1992 (19th)	Bruce Nicholson, Ned Gorman (Industrial Light & Magic)	Memoirs of an Invisible Man
1993 (20th)	Dennis Muren, Stan Winston, Phil Tippett, Michael Lantieri	Jurassic Park
1993 (20th)	Michael J. McAlister, Kimberly Nelson LoCascio	Demolition Man
1993 (20th)	(Pacific Data Images (PDI), 4-Ward Productions)	Heart and Souls
1993 (20th)	(Buena Vista Visual Effects, Matte World Digital, Rhythm & Hues)	Hocus Pocus
1993 (20th)	John E. Sullivan (Sony Pictures Imageworks [us], Boss Film Studios, Fantasy II Film Effects, Visual Concept Engineering (VCE), The Baer Animation Company Inc.)	Last Action Hero
1993 (20th)	Ariel Velasco-Shaw, Eric Leighton, Gordon Baker	The Nightmare Before Christmas
1993 (20th)	Richard Edlund	Solar Crisis
1994 (21st)	John Bruno (Digital Domain)	True Lies
1994 (21st)	Andrew Mason (International Creative Effects)	The Crow
1994 (21st)	Ken Ralston (Industrial Light & Magic)	Forrest Gump
1994 (21st)	(Illusion Arts Inc., Fantasy II Film Effects, Visual Concept Engineering)	The Shadow
1994 (21st)	Jeffrey A. Okun, Patrick Tatopoulos	Stargate
1994 (21st)	Gregory L. McMurry	Timecop
1995 (22nd)	Stan Parks (Industrial Light & Magic, Amalgamated Dynamics)	Jumanji
1995 (22nd)	John Dykstra, Thomas L. Fisher, Andrew Adamson, Eric Durst	Batman Forever
1995 (22nd)	Scott Farrar, Stan Winston, Michael Lantieri (Industrial Light & Magic)	Congo
1995 (22nd)	Eric Brevig (Industrial Light & Magic)	The Indian in the Cupboard
1995 (22nd)	Joel Hynek (Mass. Illusions LLC)	Judge Dredd
1995 (22nd)	Richard Edlund, Steve Johnson	Species
1996 (23rd)	Volker Engel, Clay Pinney, Douglas Smith, Joe Viskocil	Independence Day
1996 (23rd)	Scott Squires, Phil Tippett, James Straus, Kit West	Dragonheart
1996 (23rd)	Wes Takahashi, Charlie McClellan, Richard Taylor	The Frighteners
1996 (23rd)	Jim Mitchell, Michael L. Fink, David Andrews, Michael Lantieri (Industrial Light & Magic, Warner Digital Studios)	Mars Attacks!
1996 (23rd)	John Knoll (Industrial Light & Magic)	Star Trek: First Contact
1996 (23rd)	Stefen Fangmeier, John Frazier, Habib Zargarpour, Henry LaBounta	Twister
1997 (24th)	Phil Tippett, Scott E. Anderson, Alec Gillis, Tom Woodruff Jr., John Richardson	Starship Troopers
1997 (24th)	Pitof, Erik Henry, Alec Gillis, Tom Woodruff Jr.	Alien Resurrection
1997 (24th)	Ken Ralston, Stephen Rosenbaum, Jerome Chen, Mark Holmes	Contact
1997 (24th)	Karen E. Goulekas, Mark Stetson	The Fifth Element
1997 (24th)	Dennis Muren, Stan Winston, Michael Lantieri, Randy Dutra	The Lost World: Jurassic Park
1997 (24th)	Eric Brevig, Peter Chesney, Rob Coleman, Rick Baker	Men in Black
1998 (25th)	Volker Engel, Patrick Tatopoulos, Karen E. Goulekas, Clay Pinney	Godzilla
1998 (25th)	Pat McClung, Richard R. Hoover, John Frazier	Armageddon
1998 (25th)	Andrew Mason, Mara Bryan, Peter Doyle, Tom Davies	Dark City
1998 (25th)	Angus Bickerton	Lost in Space
1998 (25th)	Rick Baker, Hoyt Yeatman, Allen Hall, Jim Mitchell	Mighty Joe Young
1998 (25th)	Roger Guyett, Stefen Fangmeier, Neil Corbould	Saving Private Ryan
1999 (26th)	Rob Coleman, John Knoll, Dennis Muren, Scott Squires	Star Wars: Episode I – The Phantom Menace
1999 (26th)	Stan Winston, Bill George, Kim Bromley, Robert Stadd	Galaxy Quest
1999 (26th)	John Gaeta, Janek Sirrs, Steve Courtley, Jon Thum	The Matrix
1999 (26th)	John Andrew Berton Jr., Daniel Jeannette, Ben Snow, Chris Corbould	The Mummy
1999 (26th)	Jim Mitchell, Joss Williams, Kevin Yagher, Mark S. Miller	Sleepy Hollow
1999 (26th)	John Dykstra, Henry F. Anderson III, Jerome Chen, Eric Allard	Stuart Little

=== 2000s ===
Year	Recipients	Film
2000 (27th)	Scott E. Anderson, Craig Hayes, Scott Stokdyk, Stan Parks	Hollow Man
2000 (27th)	Michael Lantieri, David Drzewiecki (Amalgamated Dynamics, Rhythm, Hues Cinesite, VCE.Com)	The 6th Day
2000 (27th)	Kevin Scott Mack, Matthew E. Butler, Bryan Grill, Allen Hall	How the Grinch Stole Christmas
2000 (27th)	Stefen Fangmeier, Habib Zargarpour, Tim Alexander, John Frazier	The Perfect Storm
2000 (27th)	Michael L. Fink, Michael J. McAlister, David Prescott, Theresa Ellis Rygiel	X-Men
2001 (28th)	Dennis Muren, Scott Farrar, Stan Winston, Michael Lantieri	A.I. Artificial Intelligence
2001 (28th)	Arthur Windus, Val Wardlaw, Hal Bertram, Nick Drew, Seb Caudron	Brotherhood of the Wolf
2001 (28th)	Robert Legato, Nick Davis, Roger Guyett, John Richardson	Harry Potter and the Philosopher's Stone
2001 (28th)	Jim Mitchell, Danny Gordon Taylor, Donald Elliott, John Rosengrant	Jurassic Park III
2001 (28th)	Jim Rygiel, Randall William Cook, Richard Taylor, Mark Stetson	The Lord of the Rings: The Fellowship of the Ring
2001 (28th)	John Andrew Berton Jr., Daniel Jeannette, Neil Corbould, Thomas Rosseter	The Mummy Returns
2002 (29th)	Rob Coleman, Pablo Helman, John Knoll, Ben Snow	Star Wars: Episode II – Attack of the Clones
2002 (29th)	Jim Mitchell, Nick Davis, John Richardson, Bill George	Harry Potter and the Chamber of Secrets
2002 (29th)	Jim Rygiel, Joe Letteri, Randall William Cook, Alex Funke	The Lord of the Rings: The Two Towers
2002 (29th)	Scott Farrar, Henry LaBounta, Michael Lantieri, Nathan McGuinness	Minority Report
2002 (29th)	John Dykstra, Scott Stokdyk, Anthony LaMolinara, John Frazier	Spider-Man
2002 (29th)	Joel Hynek, Matthew E. Butler, Sean Andrew Faden, John Frazier	XXX
2003 (30th)	Jim Rygiel, Joe Letteri, Randall William Cook, Alex Funke	The Lord of the Rings: The Return of the King
2003 (30th)	Dennis Muren, Edward Hirsh, Colin Brady, Michael Lantieri	Hulk
2003 (30th)	John Gaeta, Kim Libreri, George Murphy, Craig Hayes	The Matrix Revolutions
2003 (30th)	John Knoll, Hal T. Hickel, Terry D. Frazee, Charles Gibson	Pirates of the Caribbean: The Curse of the Black Pearl
2003 (30th)	Pablo Helman, Danny Gordon Taylor, Allen Hall, John Rosengrant	Terminator 3: Rise of the Machines
2003 (30th)	Michael L. Fink, Richard E. Hollander, Stephen Rosenbaum, Mike Vézina	X2
2004 (31st)	John Dykstra, Scott Stokdyk, Anthony LaMolinara, John Frazier	Spider-Man 2
2004 (31st)	Peter Chiang, Pablo Helman, Thomas J. Smith	The Chronicles of Riddick
2004 (31st)	Karen E. Goulekas, Neil Corbould, Greg Strause, Remo Balcells	The Day After Tomorrow
2004 (31st)	Roger Guyett, Tim Burke, Bill George, John Richardson	Harry Potter and the Prisoner of Azkaban
2004 (31st)	John Nelson, Andrew R. Jones, Erik Nash, Joe Letteri	I, Robot
2004 (31st)	Scott Squires, Ben Snow, Daniel Jeannette, Syd Dutton	Van Helsing
2005 (32nd)	Joe Letteri, Richard Taylor, Christian Rivers, Brian Van't Hul	King Kong
2005 (32nd)	Janek Sirrs, Dan Glass, Chris Corbould, Paul J. Franklin	Batman Begins
2005 (32nd)	Dean Wright, Bill Westenhofer, Jim Berney, Scott Farrar	The Chronicles of Narnia: The Lion, the Witch and the Wardrobe
2005 (32nd)	Jim Mitchell, Tim Alexander, Timothy Webber, John Richardson	Harry Potter and the Goblet of Fire
2005 (32nd)	John Knoll, Roger Guyett, Rob Coleman, Brian Gernand	Star Wars: Episode III – Revenge of the Sith
2005 (32nd)	Dennis Muren, Pablo Helman, Randy Dutra, Dan Sudick	War of the Worlds
2006 (33rd)	John Knoll, Hal T. Hickel, Charles Gibson, Allen Hall	Pirates of the Caribbean: Dead Man's Chest
2006 (33rd)	Karin Joy, John Andrew Berton Jr., Blair Clark, John Dietz	Charlotte's Web
2006 (33rd)	Jeremy Dawson, Dan Schrecker, Mark G. Soper, Peter Parks	The Fountain
2006 (33rd)	Roger Guyett, Russell Earl, Pat Tubach, Dan Sudick	Mission: Impossible III
2006 (33rd)	Mark Stetson, Neil Corbould, Richard R. Hoover, Jon Thum	Superman Returns
2006 (33rd)	John Bruno, Eric Saindon, Craig Lyn, Mike Vézina	X-Men: The Last Stand
2007 (34th)	Scott Farrar, Scott Benza, Russell Earl, John Frazier	Transformers
2007 (34th)	Chris Watts, Grant Freckelton, Derek Wentworth, Daniel Leduc	300
2007 (34th)	Michael L. Fink, Bill Westenhofer, Ben Morris, Trevor Wood	The Golden Compass
2007 (34th)	Tim Burke, John Richardson, Paul J. Franklin, Greg Butler	Harry Potter and the Order of the Phoenix
2007 (34th)	John Knoll, Hal T. Hickel, Charles Gibson, John Frazier	Pirates of the Caribbean: At World's End
2007 (34th)	Scott Stokdyk, Peter Nofz, Spencer Cook, John Frazier	Spider-Man 3
2008 (35th)	Nick Davis, Chris Corbould, Timothy Webber, Paul J. Franklin	The Dark Knight
2008 (35th)	Dean Wright, Wendy Rogers	The Chronicles of Narnia: Prince Caspian
2008 (35th)	Eric Barba, Steve Preeg, Burt Dalton, Craig Barron	The Curious Case of Benjamin Button
2008 (35th)	Mike Wassel, Adrian De Wet, Andrew Chapman, Eamonn Butler	Hellboy II: The Golden Army
2008 (35th)	Pablo Helman, Dan Sudick	Indiana Jones and the Kingdom of the Crystal Skull
2008 (35th)	John Nelson, Ben Snow, Dan Sudick, Shane Mahan	Iron Man
2009 (36th)	Joe Letteri, Stephen Rosenbaum, Richard Baneham, Andrew R. Jones	Avatar
2009 (36th)	Volker Engel, Marc Weigert, Mike Vézina	2012
2009 (36th)	Dan Kaufman, Peter Muyzers, Robert Habros, Matt Aitken	District 9
2009 (36th)	Tim Burke, John Richardson, Nicolas Aithadi, Tim Alexander	Harry Potter and the Half-Blood Prince
2009 (36th)	Roger Guyett, Russell Earl, Paul Kavanagh, Burt Dalton	Star Trek
2009 (36th)	John 'D.J.' Des Jardin, Peter G. Travers, Joel Whist, Jessica Norman	Watchmen

=== 2010s ===
Year	Recipients	Film
2010 (37th)	Chris Corbould, Andrew Lockley, Paul J. Franklin, Peter Bebb	Inception
2010 (37th)	Ken Ralston, Carey Villegas, Tom C. Peitzman, David Schaub	Alice in Wonderland
2010 (37th)	Barrie Hemsley, Angus Bickerton	The Chronicles of Narnia: The Voyage of the Dawn Treader
2010 (37th)	Nicolas Aithadi, John Richardson, Christian Manz, Tim Burke	Harry Potter and the Deathly Hallows – Part 1
2010 (37th)	Ged Wright, Janek Sirrs, Ben Snow, Dan Sudick	Iron Man 2
2010 (37th)	Karl Denham, Steve Preeg, Eric Barba, Nikos Kalaitzidis	Tron: Legacy
2011 (38th)	Dan Lemmon, Joe Letteri, R. Christopher White, Daniel Barrett	Rise of the Planet of the Apes
2011 (38th)	Scott E. Anderson, Matt Aitken, Joe Letteri, Matthias Menz, Keith Miller	The Adventures of Tintin: The Secret of the Unicorn
2011 (38th)	Mark G. Soper, Christopher Townsend, Paul Corbould	Captain America: The First Avenger
2011 (38th)	Tim Burke, Greg Butler, John Richardson, David Vickery	Harry Potter and the Deathly Hallows – Part 2
2011 (38th)	Steve Riley, Russell Earl, Kim Libreri, Dennis Muren	Super 8
2011 (38th)	Scott Benza, John Frazier, Matthew E. Butler, Scott Farrar	Transformers: Dark of the Moon
2012 (39th)	Janek Sirrs, Jeff White, Guy Williams, Dan Sudick	The Avengers
2012 (39th)	Grady Cofer, Pablo Helman, Jeanie King, Burt Dalton	Battleship
2012 (39th)	Joe Letteri, Eric Saindon, David Clayton, R. Christopher White	The Hobbit: An Unexpected Journey
2012 (39th)	Chris Corbould, Peter Chiang, Scott R. Fisher, Sue Rowe	John Carter
2012 (39th)	Bill Westenhofer, Guillaume Rocheron, Erik-Jan de Boer, Donald Elliott	Life of Pi
2012 (39th)	Cedric Nicolas-Troyan, Phil Brennan, Neil Corbould, Michael Dawson	Snow White and the Huntsman
2013 (40th)	Tim Webber, Chris Lawrence, Dave Shirk, Neil Corbould	Gravity
2013 (40th)	Joe Letteri, Eric Saindon, David Clayton, Eric Reynolds	The Hobbit: The Desolation of Smaug
2013 (40th)	Joe Letteri, John 'D.J.' Des Jardin, Dan Lemmon	Man of Steel
2013 (40th)	John Knoll, James E. Price, Clay Pinney, Rocco Larizza	Pacific Rim
2013 (40th)	Roger Guyett, Patrick Tubach, Ben Grossmann, Burt Dalton	Star Trek Into Darkness
2013 (40th)	Jake Morrison, Paul Corbould, Mark Breakspear	Thor: The Dark World
2014 (41st)	Paul J. Franklin, Andrew Lockley, Ian Hunter, Scott R. Fisher	Interstellar
2014 (41st)	Dan DeLeeuw, Russell Earl, Bryan Grill, Dan Sudick	Captain America: The Winter Soldier
2014 (41st)	Joe Letteri, Dan Lemmon, Daniel Barrett, Erik Winquist	Dawn of the Planet of the Apes
2014 (41st)	Gary Brozenich, Nick Davis, Jonathan Fawkner, Matthew Rouleau	Edge of Tomorrow
2014 (41st)	Stephane Ceretti, Nicolas Aithadi, Jonathan Fawkner, Paul Corbould	Guardians of the Galaxy
2014 (41st)	Joe Letteri, Eric Saindon, David Clayton, R. Christopher White	The Hobbit: The Battle of the Five Armies
2015 (42nd)	Roger Guyett, Patrick Tubach, Neal Scanlan, Chris Corbould	Star Wars: The Force Awakens
2015 (42nd)	Paul Corbould, Christopher Townsend, Ben Snow, Paul Butterworth	Avengers: Age of Ultron
2015 (42nd)	Andrew Whitehurst, Paul Norris, Mark Williams Ardington, Sara Bennett	Ex Machina
2015 (42nd)	John Rosengrant, Michael Lantieri, Tim Alexander	Jurassic World
2015 (42nd)	Andrew Jackson, Tom Wood, Dan Oliver, Andy Williams	Mad Max: Fury Road
2015 (42nd)	Richard Stammers, Anders Langlands, Chris Lawrence, Steven Warner	The Martian
2016 (43rd)	John Knoll, Mohen Leo, Hal Hickel, Neil Corbould	Rogue One: A Star Wars Story
2016 (43rd)	Louis Morin, Ryal Cosgrove	Arrival
2016 (43rd)	Joe Letteri, Joel Whist	The BFG
2016 (43rd)	Stephane Ceretti, Richard Bluff, Vincent Cirelli	Doctor Strange
2016 (43rd)	Tim Burke, Christian Manz, David Watkins	Fantastic Beasts and Where to Find Them
2016 (43rd)	Robert Legato, Adam Valdez, Andrew R. Jones, Dan Lemmon	The Jungle Book
2017 (44th)	Christopher Townsend, Guy Williams, Jonathan Fawkner, Dan Sudick	Guardians of the Galaxy Vol. 2
2017 (44th)	Geoffrey Baumann, Craig Hammack, Dan Sudick	Black Panther
2017 (44th)	John Nelson, Paul Lambert, Richard R. Hoover, Gerd Nefzer	Blade Runner 2049
2017 (44th)	Stephen Rosenbaum, Jeff White, Scott Benza, Mike Meinardus	Kong: Skull Island
2017 (44th)	Ben Morris, Mike Mulholland, Chris Corbould, Neal Scanlan	Star Wars: The Last Jedi
2017 (44th)	Joe Letteri, Dan Lemmon, Daniel Barrett, Joel Whist	War for the Planet of the Apes
2018/2019 (45th)	Dan DeLeeuw, Matt Aitken, Russell Earl, Dan Sudick	Avengers: Endgame
2018/2019 (45th)	Michael Mulholland, David Seager, Daniele Bigi, Jeff Capogreco	Aladdin
2018/2019 (45th)	Guillaume Rocheron, Eric Frazier, Brian Connor, Peter Nofz	Godzilla: King of the Monsters
2018/2019 (45th)	Huw J. Evans, Andrew Booth, Jody Johnson, Neil Corbould	Mission: Impossible – Fallout
2018/2019 (45th)	Scott Farrar, Scott Benza, Rick O'Connor	A Quiet Place
2018/2019 (45th)	Roger Guyett, Grady Cofer, Matthew E. Butler, Dave Shirk	Ready Player One
2018/2019 (45th)	Janek Sirrs, Theodore Bialek, Brendan Seals, Alexis Wajsbrot	Spider-Man: Far From Home
2019/2020 (46th)	Roger Guyett, Neal Scanlan, Patrick Tubach, Dominic Tuohy	Star Wars: The Rise of Skywalker
2019/2020 (46th)	Scott R. Fisher, Allen Maris	Ad Astra
2019/2020 (46th)	Mark Hawker, Yael Majors, Greg Steele	Birds of Prey
2019/2020 (46th)	Nicholas Brooks, Kristy Hollidge	It Chapter Two
2019/2020 (46th)	Ken Egly, Robert Legato	The Lion King
2019/2020 (46th)	Mike Chambers, Scott R. Fisher, Andrew Jackson, Andrew Lockley	Tenet
2019/2020 (46th)	Eric Barba, Neil Corbould, Vinod Gundre, Sheldon Stopsack	Terminator: Dark Fate

=== 2020s ===
Year	Recipients	Film
2021/2022 (50th)	John “D.J.” Des Jardin, Bryan Hirota, Kevin Andrew Smith, Pier Lefebvre, and Mike Meinardus	Godzilla vs. Kong
2021/2022 (50th)	Jorundur Rafn Arnarson, Joe Letteri, and Erik Winquist	Doctor Strange in the Multiverse of Madness
2021/2022 (50th)	Sheena Duggal and Alessandro Ongaro	Ghostbusters: Afterlife
2021/2022 (50th)	David Vickery	Jurassic World Dominion
2021/2022 (50th)	Joe Farrell, Dan Oliver, Christopher Townsend, and Sean Noel Walker	Shang-Chi and the Legend of the Ten Rings
2021/2022 (50th)	Scott Edelstein, Kelly Port, Dan Sudick, and Chris Waegner	Spider-Man: No Way Home
2021/2022 (50th)	Scott R. Fisher and Ryan Tudhope	Top Gun: Maverick
2022/2023 (51st)	Joe Letteri, Richard Baneham, Eric Saindon, and Daniel Barrett	Avatar: The Way of Water
2022/2023 (51st)	Jay Cooper, Ian Comley, Andrew Roberts, and Neil Corbould	The Creator
2022/2023 (51st)	Stephane Ceretti, Alexis Wajsbrot, Guy Williams, and Dan Sudick	Guardians of the Galaxy Vol. 3
2022/2023 (51st)	Andrew Whitehurst, Kathy Siegel, Robert Weaver, and Alistair Williams	Indiana Jones and the Dial of Destiny
2022/2023 (51st)	Alex Wuttke, Simone Coco, Jeff Sutherland, and Neil Corbould	Mission: Impossible – Dead Reckoning Part One
2022/2023 (51st)	Andrew Jackson, Giacomo Mineo, Scott R. Fisher, and Dave Drzewiecki	Oppenheimer
2023/2024 (52nd)	Paul Lambert, Stephen James, Rhys Salcombe and Gerd Nefzer	Dune: Part Two
2023/2024 (52nd)	Alec Gillis, Eric Barba, Nelson Sepulveda-Fauser, Daniel Macarin, and Shane Mahan	Alien: Romulus
2023/2024 (52nd)	Angus Bickerton, James Brennan-Craddock, Neal Scanlan, and Stefano Pepin	Beetlejuice Beetlejuice
2023/2024 (52nd)	Swen Gillberg, Matthew Twyford, Vincent Papaix, and Dominic Tuohy	Deadpool & Wolverine
2023/2024 (52nd)	Takashi Yamazaki, Kiyoko Shibuya, Masaki Takahashi, and Tatsuji Nojima	Godzilla Minus One
2023/2024 (52nd)	Luke Millar, David Clayton, Keith Herft and Peter Stubbs	Kingdom of the Planet of the Apes
2023/2024 (52nd)	Ben Snow, Florian Witzel, Charles Lai, Scott R. Fisher, Dave Crispino, and Bill Georgiou	Twisters
2024/2025 (53rd)	Richard Baneham, Daniel Barrett, Joe Letteri, and Eric Saindon	Avatar: Fire and Ash
2024/2025 (53rd)	Daniele Bigi, Lisa Marra, and Scott Stokdyk	The Fantastic Four: First Steps
2024/2025 (53rd)	Andy Kind, François Lambert, Christian Manz, Glen McIntosh, and Glenn Melenhorst	How to Train Your Dragon
2024/2025 (53rd)	Kristin Hall, Ian Lowe, Dave Newton, Jeff Sutherland, and Alex Wuttke	Mission: Impossible − The Final Reckoning
2024/2025 (53rd)	Stéphane Ceretti, Enrico Damm, Stephane Nazé, and Guy Williams	Superman
2024/2025 (53rd)	Pablo Helman and Dale Newton	Wicked: For Good
