= 10th Visual Effects Society Awards =

US film and TV awards ceremony in 2012

10th Visual Effects Society Awards

February 7, 2012

Best Visual Effects in a Visual Effects Driven Motion Picture:
Rise of the Planet of the Apes

The 10th Visual Effects Society Awards was held in Beverly Hills, California at the Beverly Hilton Hotel on February 7, 2012, in honor to the best visual effects in film and television of 2011. The show was hosted by Patton Oswalt and broadcast, in edited form, on the ReelzChannel on February 19, 2012.

== Winners and nominees ==
(winners in bold)

=== Honorary Awards ===
Lifetime Achievement Award:

- **Stan Lee**

Georges Méliès Award:

- **Douglas Trumbull**

=== Film ===
Outstanding Visual Effects in a Visual Effects Driven Feature Motion Picture	Outstanding Supporting Visual Effects in a Feature Motion Picture
**Rise of the Planet of the Apes** – Dan Lemmon, Joe Letteri, Cyndi Ochs, Kurt Williams: Captain America: The First Avenger – Charlie Noble, Mark Soper, Christopher Townsend, Edson Williams; Harry Potter and the Deathly Hallows – Part 2 – Tim Burke, Emma Norton, John Richardson, David Vickery; Pirates of the Caribbean: On Stranger Tides – Gary Brozenich, David Conley, Charlie Gibson, Ben Snow; Transformers: Dark of the Moon – Scott Benza, Wayne Billheimer, Matthew Butler, Scott Farrar	**Hugo** – Ben Grossmann, Alex Henning, Rob Legato, Karen Murphy: Anonymous – André Cantarel, Volker Engel, Rony Soussan, Marc Weigert; Sherlock Holmes: A Game of Shadows – Laya Armian, Chas Jarrett, Seth Maury, Sirio Quintavalle; Source Code – Annie Godin, Louis Morin; War Horse – Duncan Burbidge, Ben Morris, Mike Mulholland, Chris Zeh
Outstanding Visual Effects in an Animated Feature Motion Picture	Outstanding Animated Character in a Live Action Feature Motion Picture
**Rango** – Tim Alexander, Hal Hickel, Jacqui Lopez, Katie Lynch: Arthur Christmas – Doug Ikeler, Chris Juen, Alan Short, Mandy Tankenson; Kung Fu Panda 2 – Melissa Cobb, Alex Parkinson, Jennifer Yuh Nelson, Raymond Zibach; Puss in Boots – Joe M. Aguilar, Guillaume Aretos, Ken Bielenberg, Chris Miller; The Adventures of Tintin – Jamie Beard, Joe Letteri, Meredith Meyer-Nichols, Eileen Moran	**Rise of the Planet of the Apes** - **Caeser** – Daniel Barrett, Florian Fernandez, Matthew Muntean, Eric Reynolds: Harry Potter and the Deathly Hallows – Part 2 - The Gringotts Dragon – Yasunoby Arahori, Tom Bracht, Gavin Harrison, Chris Lentz; Paul - Paul – Anders Beer, Julian Foddy, Jody Johnson, David Lowry; The Thing - Edvard/Adam – Lyndon Barrois, Fred Chapman, Greg Massie, Marco Menco
Outstanding Animated Character in an Animated Feature Motion Picture	Outstanding Compositing in a Feature Motion Picture
**Rango** - **Rango** – Frank Gravatt, Kevin Martel, Brian Paik, Steve Walton: Puss in Boots – Puss – Antonio Banderas, Ludovic Boouancheau, Laurent Caneiro, Olivier Staphylas; Rio - Nigel – Diana Diriwaechter, Sang Jun Lee, Sergio Pablos, Aamir Tarin; The Adventures of Tintin- Tintin – Gino Acevedo, Gustav Ahren, Jamie Beard, Simon Clutterbuck	**Captain America: The First Avenger** – Casey Allen, Trent Claus, Brian Hajek, Cliff Welsh: Harry Potter and the Deathly Hallows – Part 2 – Michele Benigna, Martin Ciastko, Thomas Dyg, Andy Robinson; Rise of the Planet of the Apes – Jean-Luc Azzis, Quentin Hema, Simon Jung, Christoph Salzmann; Transformers: Dark of the Moon – Chris Balog, Ben O'Brien, Amy Shepard, Jeff Sutherland
Outstanding Created Environment in a Live Action Feature Motion Picture	Outstanding Created Environment in an Animated Feature Motion Picture
**Transformers: Dark of the Moon** - **155 Wacker Drive** – Giles Hancock, John Hansen, Tom Martinek, Scott Younkin; Anonymous - London – André Cantarel, Robert Freitag, Greg Strasz, Rony Soussan; Harry Potter and the Deathly Hallows – Part 2 - Hogwarts – Keziah Bailey, Stephen Ellis, Clement Gerard, Pietro Ponti; Thor - Heimdall's Observatory – Pierre Buffin, Audrey Ferrara, Yoel Godo, Dominique Vidal	**Rango** - **Main Street Dirt** – John Bell, Polly Ing, Martin Murphy, Russell Paul: Puss in Boots - The Cloud World – Guillaume Aretos, Greg Lev, Brett Miller, Peter Zaslav; The Adventures of Tintin - Bagghar – Hamish Beachman, Adam King, Wayne Stables, Mark Tait; The Adventures of Tintin - Docks – Matt Aitken, Jeff Capogreco, Jason Lazaroff, Alessandro Mozzato; The Adventures of Tintin - Pirate Battle – Phil Barrenger, Keith F. Miller, Alessandro Saponi, Christoph Sprenger
Outstanding Models in a Feature Motion Picture	Outstanding Virtual Cinematography in a Live Action Feature Motion Picture
**Transformers: Dark of the Moon** - **Driller** – Tim Brakensiek, Kelvin Chu, David Fogler, Rene Garcia: Harry Potter and the Deathly Hallows – Part 2 - Hogwarts School Buildings – Steven Godfrey Pietro Ponti, Tania Marie Richard, Andy Warren; Hugo - Train Crash – Scott Beverly; Mission: Impossible – Ghost Protocol - Parking Garage –John Goodson, Russell Paul, Kristian Pedlow, Vick Schutz	**Hugo** – Martin Chamney, Rob Legato, Adam Watkins, Fabio Zangla: Rise of the Planet of the Apes – Thelvin Cabezas, Mike Perry, R. Christopher White, Erik Winquist; Thor – Xavier Allard, Pierre Buffin, Nicolas Chevallier; Transformers: Dark of the Moon – Michael Balog, Richard Bluff, Shawn Kelly, Jeff White
Outstanding Virtual Cinematography in an Animated Feature Motion Picture	
**Rango** – Colin Benoit, Philippe Rebours, Nelson Sepulveda, Nick Walker: Arthur Christmas – Jericca Cleland, Michael Ford, David Morehead, Emi Tahira; Cars 2 – Mahyar Abousaeedi, Sharon Calahan, Jeremy Lasky, Jonathan Pytko; The Adventures of Tintin – Matt Aitken, Matthias Menz, Keith F. Miller, Wayne Stables	

=== Television ===
Outstanding Visual Effects in a Broadcast Series	Outstanding Supporting Visual Effects in a Broadcast Program
**Terra Nova** – Kevin Blank, Colin Brady, Adica Manis, Jason Zimmerman: The Bomber – Igor Gotsulyak, Dmitriy Kolesnik, Egor Olesov, Dmitriy Ovecharenko; Falling Skies – Rob Biagi, Curt Miller, Andrew Orloff, Sean Tompkins; Fringe – Robert Habros, Andrew Orloff, Jay Worth, Chris Wright; Planet Dinosaur – Phil Dobree, Luke Dodd, Haz Dulull, Mark Sherwood	**Game of Thrones** - **Winter Is Coming** – Lucy Ainsworth-Taylor, Angela Barson, Ed Bruce, Adam McInnes: Boardwalk Empire - Georgia Peaches – Richard Friedlander, Robert Stromberg, David Taritero; Bones - Tornado Case – Christian Cardona, Buddy Gheen, Beau Janzen, Andy Simonson; Breaking Bad - Face Off – Bruce Branit, Wener Hahnlein, Gregory Nicotero, William Powloski; Pan Am - Pilot – Tavis Larkham, Chris Martin, Sam Nicholson, Matt Robken
Outstanding Animated Character in a Broadcast Program or Commercial	Outstanding Compositing in a Broadcast Program or Commercial
**Canal +** - **The Bear** – Lauent Creusot, Guillaume Ho, Olivier Mitonneau, Michal Nauzin: Audi A6 Avant - Hummingbird – Tom Bussell, Jorge Montiel; Carl's Jr. - Robot – Matt Heimlich, Fred Hopp, Philip Ineno, Rob Ramsdell; Game of Thrones - Fire and Blood – Henry Badgett, Mark Brown, Rafael Morant, James Sutton	**Boardwalk Empire** - **Gimcrack & Bunkum** – Anton Dawson, Eran Dinur, Austin Meyers, David Reynolds: Any World: Jeep - Call of Duty MW3 – Jason Bergman, Rodrigo Dorsch, Steve Meyer, Peter Sidoriak; Channel 4 - Street Summer – Stirling Archibald, Anthony Bloor, Michael Gregory, Giacomo Mineo; DirecTV - Hot House – Franck Lambertz
Outstanding Created Environment in a Broadcast Program or Commercial	Outstanding Models in a Broadcast Program or Commercial
**Game of Thrones** - **The Icewall** – Markus Kuha, Damien Macé, Dante Harbridge Robinson, Fani Vassiadi: Audi A6 Avant - Hummingbird – Amaan Akram, Tom Bussell, Alex Hammond; Boardwalk Empire - Two Boats and a Lifeguard – Matthew Conner, Robert Stromberg; Pan Am - Pilot Worldport Terminal – William Arance, Diego Galtieri, Martin Hike, Anthony Ocampo; Terra Nova – Terra Nova – Michael Bozulich, Eric Hance, Kevin Kipper, David Morton	**Boardwalk Empire** - **Georgia Peaches** – Matthew Conner, Eran Dinur, David Reynolds, Szymon Weglarski; Arrowhead Nature's Fix – Carl Horner, Ian Hunter, Miyo Nakamura, Hayley O'Neill; Falling Skies - Airbase – Jon Chesson, Steve Graves, Michael Kirylo, Renaud Talon; Once Upon a Time - Snow's Castle – Michael Kirylo, Jeremy Melton, Jason O. Monroe, Chris Strauss
Outstanding Virtual Cinematography in a Broadcast Program or Commercial	Outstanding Visual Effects in a Broadcast Miniseries, Movie or Special
**Gears of War 3** - **Dust to Dust** – Niles Heckman, Richard Morton, Vernon Wilbert Jr.: Ghost Recon - Future Soldier "Camo Up" – David Liu; Mattel: Hot Wheels – Steve Beck, Robert Sethi, Felix Urquiza; Once Upon A Time - Cinderella's Courtyard – Stephen Jackson, Sallyanne Massimini, Nathan Matsuda, Kevin Struckman	**Inside the Human Body** – Phil Dobree, Sophie Orde, Dan Upton: Finding Life Beyond Earth – Simon Clarke, Hasraf Dulull, Vikas Gandhi, Francisco Lima; Gettysburg – J. David Everhart, Kent Johnson, Jon Rhinehardt, Jon Rosenthal; Prep & Landing: Naughty vs. Nice – Kevin Deters, Dorothy McKim, John Murrah, Stevie Wermers-Skelton
Outstanding Visual Effects in a Live Action Commercial	Outstanding Visual Effects in an Animated Commercial or Video Game Trailer
**Dior J'adore** – Pascal Giroux, Julien Meesters, Stephane Pivron, Manuel Souillac: Jameson: Fire – Christopher Bankoff, Sascha M. Flick, Dan Glass, Jeff Willette; Johnnie Walker: Rock Giant – Vincent Baertsoen, Camila De Biaggi, Angus Kneale, Rob Petrie; Kia: Share Some Soul – Charles Abou Aad, Andy Boyd, Nordin Rahhali, Mike Wigart; Volkswagen: Hedgehog – Mhamed Elmezoued, Stephane Montel, Emilie Nicodex	**Diablo III: The Black Soulstone** – Nicholas S. Carpenter, Jon Lanz, Chris Thunig, Taka Yasuda: Audi A6 Avant - Hummingbird – Tom Bussell, Hugo Guerra, Rahel Makonnen, Jorge Montiel; Coca-Cola Siege – Russell Dodgson, Simon French, Diarmid Harrison-Murray, Sarah Hiddlestone; Prey 2 – Heikki Anttila, Brandon Riza, Al Shier, Dave Wilson; Sony: 2 Worlds – Melanie La Rue, David Liu, Richard Morton

=== Other categories ===
Outstanding Visual Effects in a Special Venue Project	Outstanding Visual Effects in a Student Project
**Transformers the Ride: The Ultimate 3D Battle** – Lori Arnold, Yannick Dusseault, Delio Tramontozzi, Jeff White: Amazin – Marc Rienzo, Barry Safley, Eric Sanford, Lisa Zusmer Delprete; Humbugged! Rockettes to the Rescue – Mike Fortner, Troy Griffin, Jasmine Johnson, Glo Minaya; Star Tours: The Adventure Continues – Bill George, Jeanie King, Glen McIntosh, Marianna McLean; Typhoon 360 – Peter Crosman, Seungyong Lee, Michael "oz" Smith, Brent Young	**a.maize** – Roman Kaelin, Falko Paeper, Florian Wittmann: Aquatic Bloom – Susie Hong, Bokyeong Kim; Defective Detective – Avner Geller, Stevie Lewis; Hai Hase – Florian Greth, Julia Reck; Renee the Movie –Syrena Edmonds, Zack Heimbegner, Brian Mullen, Nathaniel Skinner; We Miss You – Jann Doeppert, Tonio Freitag, Hanna Maria Heidrich, Sebastian Nozon
