= List of accolades received by the Pirates of the Caribbean film series =

List of accolades received by Pirates of the Caribbean
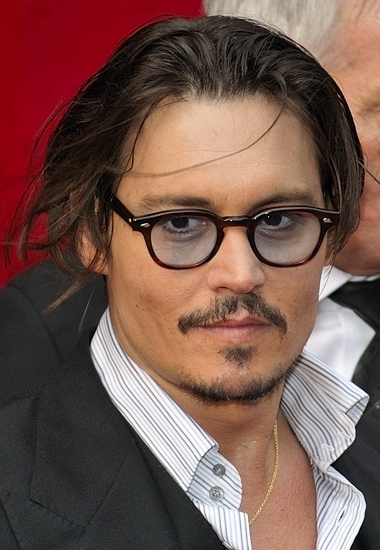
- Johnny Depp has been critically lauded for his portrayal of Jack Sparrow and has been nominated for over 30 awards.
Awards and nominations
Award	Wins	Nominations
Academy Awards	1	11
American Choreography Awards	1	0
Art Directors Guild	0	3
Artios Awards	0	2
ASCAP Film and Television Music Awards	3	0
BAFTA Awards	2	9
Bram Stoker Awards	0	1
Broadcast Film Critics Association Awards	1	2
Cinema Audio Society Awards	0	2
Costume Designers Guild Awards	0	3
Eddie Awards	1	2
Empire Awards	1	8
Golden Globe Awards	0	2
Golden Reel Awards	1	8
Golden Trailer Awards	0	3
Grammy Awards	0	1
Hollywood Film Festival	3	0
Hollywood Makeup Artist and Hair Stylist Guild Awards	2	1
Hugo Awards	0	1
Irish Film and Television Awards	2	0
Kid's Choice Awards	2	4
Mainichi Film Concours	1	0
MTV Movie Awards	4	9
MTV Movie Awards Mexico	2	0
Online Film Critics Society Awards	0	5
People's Choice Awards	6	0
Phoenix Film Critics Society Awards	0	7
Rembrandt Awards	2	0
Satellite Awards	1	7
Saturn Awards	3	17
Screen Actors Guild Awards	1	1
Teen Choice Awards	17	4
Visual Effects Society	10	11
Washington D.C. Area Film Critics Association Awards	0	1
World Soundtrack Awards	0	1
World Stunt Awards	2	2
Young Artist Awards	0	1

Totals (Note: Certain award groups do not simply award one winner. They acknowledge several different recipients, have runners-up, and have third place. Since this is a specific recognition and is different from losing an award, runner-up mentions are considered wins in this award tally. For simplification and to avoid errors, each award in this list has been presumed to have had a prior nomination.)
- Wins: 82
- Nominations: 171

The Pirates of the Caribbean franchise is a fantasy-adventure film series consisting of The Curse of the Black Pearl (2003), Dead Man's Chest (2006), At World's End (2007), On Stranger Tides (2011) and Dead Men Tell No Tales (2017). The first three films were directed by Gore Verbinski, while the fourth was by Rob Marshall; the series was written by Ted Elliott and Terry Rossio, produced by Jerry Bruckheimer and distributed by Walt Disney Pictures. The Pirates films have featured such characters as Captain Jack Sparrow (Johnny Depp), Will Turner (Orlando Bloom), Elizabeth Swann (Keira Knightley), Captain Hector Barbossa (Geoffrey Rush), Joshamee Gibbs (Kevin McNally), Davy Jones (Bill Nighy), Angelica (Penélope Cruz), Blackbeard (Ian McShane), Philip Swift (Sam Claflin) and Syrena (Àstrid Bergès-Frisbey). Hans Zimmer composed the score primarily, although Klaus Badelt composed for the first film.

The Curse of the Black Pearl was 2003's fourth highest-grossing film worldwide (behind The Lord of the Rings: The Return of the King, Finding Nemo and The Matrix Reloaded). Dead Man's Chest was 2006's highest-grossing film worldwide, and the sixth highest-grossing film of all time (originally third), behind Avatar, Titanic, Harry Potter and the Deathly Hallows – Part 2, Transformers: Dark of the Moon and The Lord of the Rings: The Return of the King. At World's End was 2007's highest-grossing film worldwide and the twelfth highest ever (originally sixth), and On Stranger Tides was 2011's third highest-grossing film and is the twelfth highest-grossing film of all time worldwide.

Pirates of the Caribbean has received reviews ranging from positive to negative. The Curse of the Black Pearl received 78% positive reviews of 197 sampled critics on review aggregate Rotten Tomatoes and garnered an average rating of 7.1/10. Dead Man's Chest received a 54% "Rotten" rating on Rotten Tomatoes. At World's End has a "Rotten" rating of 45% on Rotten Tomatoes and 50% at Metacritic, although opinions differed from positive to negative. On Stranger Tides has received generally mixed reviews. Rotten Tomatoes reports that 33% of critics have given the film a positive review based on 232 reviews, with an average score of 5/10. Dead Men Tell No Tales received generally negative reviews. On the review aggregator website Rotten Tomatoes, 30% of 291 critics' reviews are positive, with an average rating of 4.7/10. Metacritic, which uses a weighted average, assigned the film a score of 39 out of 100, based on 45 critics, indicating "generally unfavorable" reviews.

It has won a plethora of prestigious awards and has gathered 11 Academy Award nominations (five for The Curse of the Black Pearl, four for Dead Man's Chest and two for At World's End), with one win for Best Visual Effects in 2006 for Dead Man's Chest. Pirates has also won two BAFTA awards, 17 Teen Choice Awards, and has been nominated for two Golden Globes, two Eddie awards (winning one), one Grammy, nine MTV Movie Awards (winning four), 17 Saturn Awards (winning four), seven Satellites (winning one) and two Artios Awards.

== The Curse of the Black Pearl ==
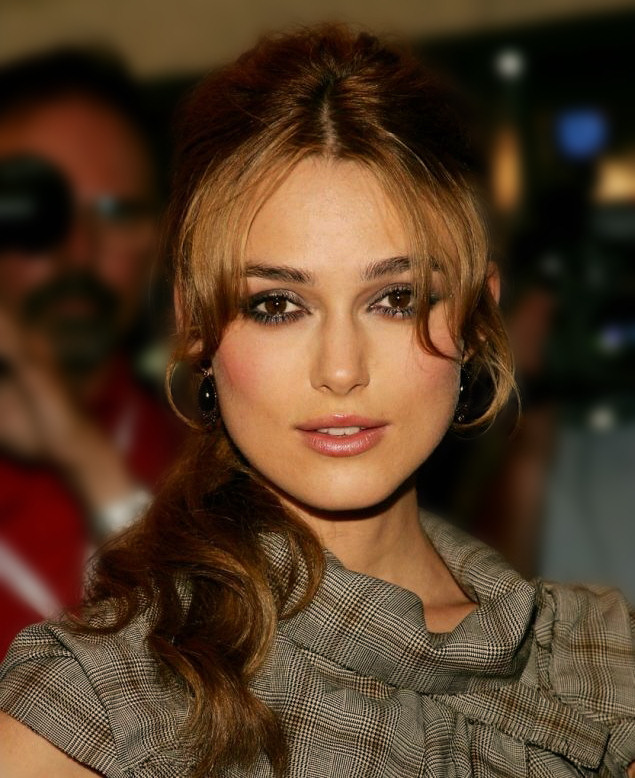
Keira Knightley was nominated for two Saturn Awards for her portrayal of Elizabeth Swann.

The franchise's first film, Pirates of the Caribbean: The Curse of the Black Pearl, was released in 2003 to a high gross, and positive reviews, with Empire magazine claiming it to be "the best blockbuster of the summer" and Roger Ebert praising Johnny Depp's performance for its "originality". It was directed by Gore Verbinski and produced by Jerry Bruckheimer. The story follows a blacksmith, Will Turner, (Orlando Bloom) and a pirate, Captain Jack Sparrow (Johnny Depp), as they rescue a kidnapped Elizabeth Swann (Keira Knightley) from the cursed crew of the Black Pearl, captained by Hector Barbossa (Geoffrey Rush).

It was nominated for five Academy Awards, but did not win in any of its categories. It was also nominated for five BAFTA Awards (winning one), five Empire Awards (winning one), one Golden Globe, three Golden Reel Awards (winning one), six MTV Movie Awards (winning one), five Online Film Critics Society Awards, eight Phoenix Film Critics Society Awards, six Satellite Awards, 11 Saturn Awards (winning one), five Teen Choice Awards (winning four), eight Visual Effects Society Award (winning two) and two Washington DC Area Film Critics Association Awards (winning one), with multiple other awards.

Award	Category	Recipients	Outcome
Academy Awards	Best Actor	Johnny Depp	Nominated
Academy Awards	Best Makeup	Ve Neill, Martin Samuel	Nominated
Academy Awards	Best Sound Editing	Christopher Boyes, George Watters II	Nominated
Academy Awards	Best Sound Mixing	Christopher Boyes, David Parker, David E. Campbell, Lee Orloff	Nominated
Academy Awards	Best Visual Effects	John Knoll, Hal T. Hickel, Charles Gibson, Terry D. Frazee	Nominated
American Choreography Awards	Outstanding Achievement in Choreography – Fight	George Marshall Ruge	Won
Art Directors Guild	Excellence in Production Design – Period or Fantasy Film	Brian Morris, Derek R. Hill, Donald B. Woodruff, James E. Tocci, William Ladd Skinner, Robert Woodruff	Nominated
Artios Awards	Best Casting for Feature Film, Comedy	Ronna Kress	Nominated
ASCAP Film and Television Music Awards	Top Box Office Films	Klaus Badelt	Won
BAFTA Awards	Best Makeup and Hair	Ve Neill, Martin Samuel	Won
BAFTA Awards	Best Actor in a Leading Role	Johnny Depp	Nominated
BAFTA Awards	Best Special Visual Effects	John Knoll, Hal T. Hickel, Terry D. Frazee, Charles Gibson	Nominated
BAFTA Awards	Best Costume Design	Penny Rose	Nominated
BAFTA Awards	Best Sound	Christopher Boyes, George Watters II, Lee Orloff, David Parker, David E. Campbell	Nominated
Bram Stoker Awards	Best Screenplay	Ted Elliott, Terry Rossio	Nominated
Broadcast Film Critics Association Awards	Best Family Film	—	Won
Broadcast Film Critics Association Awards	Best Actor	Johnny Depp	Nominated
Cinema Audio Society Awards	Outstanding Achievement in Sound Mixing for Motion Pictures	Christopher Boyes, David Parker, David E. Campbell, Lee Orloff	Nominated
Costume Designers Guild Awards	Excellence in Period/Fantasy Film	Penny Rose	Nominated
Critics' Choice Awards	Best Family Film	—	Won
Dallas-Ft. Worth Film Critics Association Awards	Best Actor	Johnny Depp	Nominated
Eddie Awards	Best Edited Feature Film – Comedy or Musical	Craig Wood, Stephen E. Rivkin, Arthur Schmidt	Won
Empire Awards	Best Actor	Johnny Depp	Won
Empire Awards	Best Film	—	Nominated
Empire Awards	Best British Actress	Keira Knightley	Nominated
Empire Awards	Best Newcomer	Mackenzie Crook	Nominated
Empire Awards	Scene of the Year – "The rum scene"	—	Nominated
Gold Derby Awards	Best Lead Actor	Johnny Depp	Nominated
Golden Globe Awards	Best Actor – Motion Picture Musical or Comedy	Johnny Depp	Nominated
Golden Reel Awards	Best Sound Editing in Domestic Features – Dialogue & ADR	George Watters II, Christopher Boyes, Teri E. Dorman, Jessica Gallavan, Ulrika Akander, David A. Arnold, Gloria D'Alessandro, Lisa J. Levine, Victoria Rose Sampson, Karen Spangenberg	Won
Golden Reel Awards	Best Sound Editing in Domestic Features – Sound Effects & Foley	George Watters II, Christopher Boyes, Victoria Martin, Addison Teague, Timothy Nielsen, Ken Fischer, Matthew Harrison, James Likowski, Christine Danelski, Valerie Davidson, Solange S. Schwalbe	Nominated
Golden Reel Awards	Best Sound Editing in a Feature – Music – Feature Film	Jeanette Surga, Christopher Brooks, Kenneth Karman	Nominated
Golden Trailer Awards	Best Action	Giaronomo Productions	Nominated
Hollywood Film Festival	Hollywood Movie of the Year	Gore Verbinski	Won
Hollywood Film Festival	Hollywood Breakthrough Acting Awards	Orlando Bloom	Won
Hollywood Makeup Artist and Hair Stylist Guild Awards	Best Character Hair Styling – Feature	Martin Samuel and Lucia Mace	Won
Hollywood Makeup Artist and Hair Stylist Guild Awards	Best Period Hair Styling	Martin Samuel, Lucia Mace, and Nina Paskewitz	Nominated
Hollywood Makeup Artist and Hair Stylist Guild Awards	Best Period Makeup – Feature	Ve Neill, Joel Harlow, Douglas Noe, David DeLeon, Ken Diaz, David Dupuis, Deborah Patino Rutherford, Jene Fielder	Won
Hollywood Makeup Artist and Hair Stylist Guild Awards	Best Character Makeup – Feature	Ve Neill, Joel Harlow	Nominated
Hugo Awards	Best Dramatic Presentation – Long Form	—	Nominated
Irish Film and Television Awards	Best International Actor	Johnny Depp	Won
Irish Film and Television Awards	Best International Actress	Keira Knightley	Won
MTV Movie Awards	Best Male Performance	Johnny Depp	Won
MTV Movie Awards	Best Comedic Performance	Johnny Depp	Nominated
MTV Movie Awards	Best Movie	—	Nominated
MTV Movie Awards	Best On-Screen Duo	Johnny Depp, Orlando Bloom	Nominated
MTV Movie Awards	Best Villain	Geoffrey Rush	Nominated
MTV Movie Awards	Best Breakthrough Performance	Keira Knightley	Nominated
MTV Movie Awards Mexico	Best Look (Mejor Look)	Johnny Depp	Won
MTV Movie Awards Mexico	Sexiest Hero (Héroe más Sexy)	Orlando Bloom	Won
Online Film & Television Association Awards	Best Actor	Johnny Depp	Nominated
Online Film & Television Association Awards	Best Costume Design	Penny Rose	Nominated
Online Film & Television Association Awards	Best Makeup	—	Nominated
Online Film & Television Association Awards	Best Visual Effects	—	Nominated
Online Film Critics Society Awards	Best Actor	Johnny Depp	Nominated
Online Film Critics Society Awards	Best Costume Design	—	Nominated
Online Film Critics Society Awards	Best Original Score	Klaus Badelt	Nominated
Online Film Critics Society Awards	Best Sound	—	Nominated
Online Film Critics Society Awards	Best Visual Effects	—	Nominated
People's Choice Awards	Favorite Motion Picture	—	Won
Phoenix Film Critics Society Awards	Best Costume Design	Penny Rose	Nominated
Phoenix Film Critics Society Awards	Best Director	Gore Verbinski	Nominated
Phoenix Film Critics Society Awards	Best Makeup	Ve Neill, Martin Samuel	Nominated
Phoenix Film Critics Society Awards	Best Performance by an Actor in a Leading Role	Johnny Depp	Nominated
Phoenix Film Critics Society Awards	Best Picture	—	Nominated
Phoenix Film Critics Society Awards	Best Production Design	Brian Morris	Nominated
Phoenix Film Critics Society Awards	Best Visual Effects	John Knoll, Hal T. Hickel, Charles Gibson, Terry D. Frazee	Nominated
Phoenix Film Critics Society Awards	Breakout Performance – On Screen	Keira Knightley	Nominated
Satellite Awards	Best Costume Design	Penny Rose	Nominated
Satellite Awards	Best Film – Musical or Comedy	—	Nominated
Satellite Awards	Best Overall DVD	—	Nominated
Satellite Awards	Best Actor – Motion Picture Musical or Comedy	Johnny Depp	Nominated
Satellite Awards	Best Supporting Actor – Motion Picture	Geoffrey Rush	Nominated
Satellite Awards	Best Visual Effects	John Knoll	Nominated
Saturn Awards	Best Costume	Penny Rose	Won
Saturn Awards	Cinescape Genre Face of the Future Award – Female	Keira Knightley	Nominated
Saturn Awards	Best Actor	Johnny Depp	Nominated
Saturn Awards	Best DVD Special Edition Release	—	Nominated
Saturn Awards	Best Direction	Gore Verbinski	Nominated
Saturn Awards	Best Fantasy Film	—	Nominated
Saturn Awards	Best Make-up	Ve Neill, Martin Samuel	Nominated
Saturn Awards	Best Music	Klaus Badelt	Nominated
Saturn Awards	Best Special Effects	John Knoll, Hal T. Hickel, Terry D. Frazee, Charles Gibson	Nominated
Saturn Awards	Best Supporting Actor	Geoffrey Rush	Nominated
Saturn Awards	Best Supporting Actress	Keira Knightley	Nominated
Screen Actors Guild Awards	Outstanding Performance by a Male Actor in a Leading Role	Johnny Depp	Won
Teen Choice Awards	Choice Movie Chemistry	Orlando Bloom, Keira Knightley	Won
Teen Choice Awards	Choice Movie Fight/Action Sequence	—	Won
Teen Choice Awards	Choice Movie Liar	Johnny Depp	Won
Teen Choice Awards	Choice Movie Liplock	Orlando Bloom, Keira Knightley	Won
Teen Choice Awards	Choice Breakout Movie Star – Female	Keira Knightley	Nominated
Visual Effects Society Award	Outstanding Matte Painting in a Motion Picture	Yannick Dusseault, Susumu Yukuhiro, Jonathan Harb	Won
Visual Effects Society Award	Outstanding Special Effects in Service to Visual Effects in a Motion Picture	Geoff Heron, Robbie Clot, Jason Brackett, John McLeod	Won
Visual Effects Society Award	Outstanding Character Animation in a Live Action Motion Picture	Sue Campbell, James Tooley, Geoff Campbell, Dugan Beach	Nominated
Visual Effects Society Award	Outstanding Models and Miniatures in a Motion Picture	Charles Bailey, Peter Bailey, Robert Edwards, Don Bies	Nominated
Visual Effects Society Award	Outstanding Models and Miniatures in a Motion Picture	Geoff Campbell, James Tooley, Steve Walton, Dugan Beach	Nominated
Visual Effects Society Award	Outstanding Performance by a Male or Female Actor in an Effects Film	Keira Knightley	Nominated
Visual Effects Society Award	Outstanding Visual Effects Photography in a Motion Picture	Carl Miller, Michael Conte, Tami Carter	Nominated
Visual Effects Society Award	Outstanding Visual Effects in a Visual Effects Driven Motion Picture	John Knoll, Patrick T. Myers, Hal T. Hickel, Jill Brooks	Nominated
Washington DC Area Film Critics Association Awards	Best Guilty Pleasure	—	Won
Washington DC Area Film Critics Association Awards	Best Actor	Johnny Depp	Nominated
World Soundtrack Awards	Best Original Soundtrack of the Year	Klaus Badelt	Nominated
World Stunt Awards	Best Fight	Tony Angelotti, Mark Aaron Wagner	Won
Young Artist Awards	Best Family Feature Film – Comedy or Musical	—	Nominated

== Dead Man's Chest ==
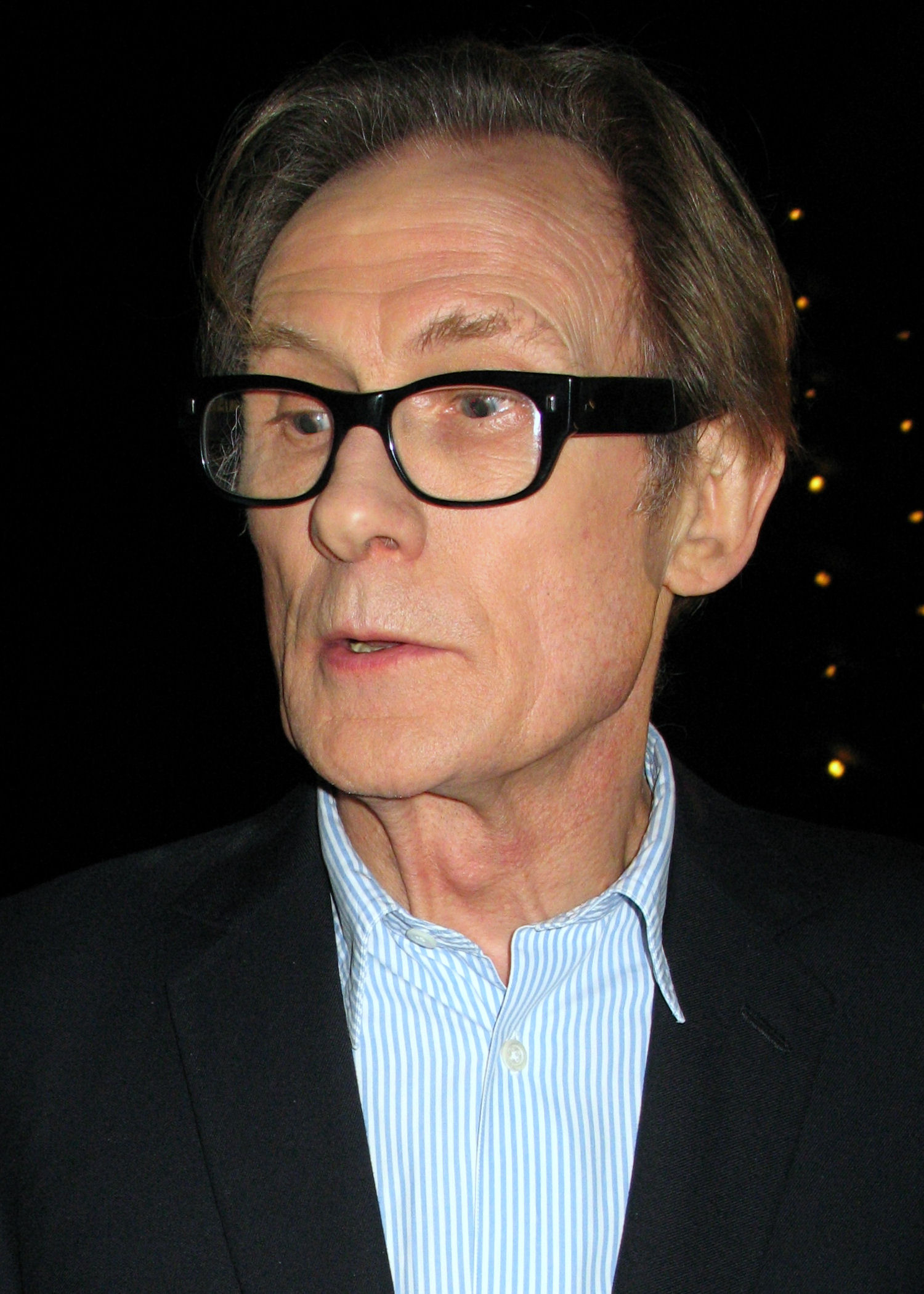
Bill Nighy was nominated for a Saturn Award, an MTV Movie Award, and won a Teen Choice Award for his portrayal of Davy Jones.

The franchise's second film, Pirates of the Caribbean: Dead Man's Chest was released in 2006 to a high gross of over $1 billion, but received mixed reviews, with BBC critic Paul Arendt negatively comparing it to The Matrix Reloaded, as "a complex film that merely led onto the next film" but Michael Booth of The Denver Post called it "two hours and 20 minutes of escapism that once again makes the movies safe for guilt-free fun". It was directed by Gore Verbinski, written by Ted Elliott and Terry Rossio, and produced by Jerry Bruckheimer. It was shot back-to-back with the franchise's third film, Pirates of the Caribbean: At World's End. The film's plot follows Captain Jack Sparrow (Johnny Depp) as he discovers his debt to Davy Jones (Bill Nighy) is due, and the marriage of Will Turner (Orlando Bloom) and Elizabeth Swann (Keira Knightley) is interrupted by Lord Cutler Beckett (Tom Hollander), who wants Turner to acquire Sparrow's compass.

It received four Academy Award nominations, of which it won one for Best Visual Effects. It was also nominated for five BAFTA Awards (winning one), one Eddie Award, four Empire Awards, one Golden Globe Award for Best Actor in a Motion Picture Musical or Comedy for Johnny Depp, one Grammy Award, three Kids' Choice Awards (winning one), four MTV Movie Awards (winning two), five Saturn Awards (winning one), 10 Teen Choice Awards (winning seven) and won all three People's Choice Award nominations, six Visual Effects Society Awards and a Satellite Award.

Award	Category	Recipients and nominees	Outcome
Academy Awards	Best Art Direction	Rick Heinrichs, Cheryl Carasik	Nominated
Academy Awards	Best Sound Editing	Christopher Boyes, George Watters II	Nominated
Academy Awards	Best Sound Mixing	Paul Massey, Christopher Boyes, Lee Orloff	Nominated
Academy Awards	Best Visual Effects	John Knoll, Hal T. Hickel, Charlie Gibson, Allen Hall	Won
Art Directors Guild	Feature Film – Fantasy Film	Rick Heinrichs, John Dexter, William Ladd Skinner, Bruce Crone, William Hawkins, Nick Navarro, Domenic Silvestri, Robert Woodruff, Eric Sundahl, Darrell L. Wight, Gary Diamond, Clint Wallace	Nominated
Artios Awards	Best Feature Film Casting – Comedy	Denise Chamian	Nominated
BAFTA Awards	Best Special Visual Effects	John Knoll, Charles Gibson, Hal T. Hickel, Allen Hall	Won
BAFTA Awards	Best Costume Design	Penny Rose	Nominated
BAFTA Awards	Best Makeup and Hair	Ve Neill, Martin Samuel	Nominated
BAFTA Awards	Best Production Design	Rick Heinrichs, Cheryl Carasik	Nominated
BAFTA Awards	Best Sound	Christopher Boyes, George Watters II, Paul Massey, Lee Orloff	Nominated
Broadcast Film Critics Association Awards	Best Family Film	—	Nominated
Cinema Audio Society Awards	Outstanding Achievement in Sound Mixing for Motion Pictures	Paul Massey, Christopher Boyes, Lee Orloff	Nominated
Costume Designers Guild Awards	Excellence in Period Film	Penny Rose	Nominated
Eddie Awards	Best Edited Feature Film – Comedy or Musical	Craig Wood, Stephen E. Rivkin	Nominated
Empire Awards	Best Actor	Johnny Depp	Nominated
Empire Awards	Best Actress	Keira Knightley	Nominated
Empire Awards	Best Sci-Fi/Fantasy	—	Nominated
Empire Awards	Scene of the Year – "The waterwheel swordfight"	—	Nominated
Gold Derby Awards	Best Makeup/Hair	Joel Harlow and Martin Samuel	Nominated
Gold Derby Awards	Best Sound Editing/Mixing	Christopher Boyes, Paul Massey, Lee Orloff, and George Watters II	Nominated
Gold Derby Awards	Best Visual Effects	John Knoll, Hal Hickel, Charles Gibson, and Allen Hall	Won
Golden Globe Awards	Best Actor – Motion Picture Musical or Comedy	Johnny Depp	Nominated
Golden Reel Awards	Best Sound Editing in Feature Film: Music	Melissa Muik, Julie Pearce	Nominated
Golden Reel Awards	Best Sound Editing in Feature Film: Dialogue and Automated Dialogue Replacement	George Watters II, Christopher Boyes, Teri E. Dorman, Jessica Gallavan, David A. Arnold, Michelle Pazer, Gloria D'Alessandro, Ulrika Akander, Lisa J. Levine, Julie Feiner, Howell Gibbens	Nominated
Golden Reel Awards	Best Sound Editing in Feature Film: Sound Effects and Foley	Christopher Boyes, George Watters II, Victoria Martin, Ken Fischer, Addison Teague, Timothy Nielsen, Shannon Mills, Brent Burge, Melanie Graham, Dee Selby, Matthew Harrison, James Likowski, F. Hudson Miller, Dan O'Connell, John T. Cucci	Nominated
Golden Trailer Awards	Summer 2006 Blockbuster	Buena Vista Pictures, The Ant Farm	Nominated
Grammy Awards	Best Score Soundtrack Album for Motion Picture, Television or Other Visual Media	Hans Zimmer	Nominated
Hollywood Film Festival	Visual Effects of the Year	John Knoll	Won
Hollywood Professional Association Awards	Outstanding Compositing - Feature Film	—	Won
International Film Music Critics Awards	Best Original Score for an Action/Thriller Film	Hans Zimmer	Nominated
Japan Academy Awards	Best Foreign Film	—	Nominated
Nickelodeon Kids' Choice Awards	Favorite Movie	—	Won
Nickelodeon Kids' Choice Awards	Favorite Male Movie Star	Johnny Depp	Nominated
Nickelodeon Kids' Choice Awards	Favorite Female Movie Star	Keira Knightley	Nominated
MTV Movie Awards	Best Movie	—	Won
MTV Movie Awards	Best Male Performance	Johnny Depp	Won
MTV Movie Awards	Best Female Performance	Keira Knightley	Nominated
MTV Movie Awards	Best Villain	Bill Nighy	Nominated
Online Film and Television Association Awards	Best Makeup and Hair	—	Nominated
Online Film and Television Association Awards	Best Sound Effects	—	Nominated
Online Film and Television Association Awards	Best Visual Effects	—	Nominated
People's Choice Awards	Favorite Movie	—	Won
People's Choice Awards	Favorite Movie Drama	—	Won
People's Choice Awards	Favorite On-Screen Match-Up	Keira Knightley, Johnny Depp	Won
Satellite Awards	Best Visual Effects	John Knoll, Hal T. Hickel	Won
Saturn Awards	Best Fantasy Film	—	Nominated
Saturn Awards	Best Supporting Actor	Bill Nighy	Nominated
Saturn Awards	Best Special Effects	John Knoll, Hal T. Hickel, Charles Gibson, Allen Hall	Won
Saturn Awards	Best Costume Design	Penny Rose	Nominated
Saturn Awards	Best Make-up	Ve Neill, Joel Harlow	Nominated
Scream Awards	Best Fantasy Movie	—	Won
Scream Awards	Most Heroic Performance	Johnny Depp	Won
Scream Awards	Best F/X	—	Won
Scream Awards	Best Sequel	—	Nominated
Scream Awards	Best Screenplay	Ted Elliott and Terry Rossio	Nominated
St. Louis Film Critics' Awards	Best Visual/Special Effects	—	Won
Teen Choice Awards	Choice Action Movie Actor	Johnny Depp	Won
Teen Choice Awards	Choice Summer Movie	—	Won
Teen Choice Awards	Choice Movie Scream	Keira Knightley	Won
Teen Choice Awards	Choice Action Movie	—	Won
Teen Choice Awards	Choice Movie Rumble	Orlando Bloom, Jack Davenport	Won
Teen Choice Awards	Choice Hissy Fit	Keira Knightley	Won
Teen Choice Awards	Choice Movie Villain	Bill Nighy	Won
Teen Choice Awards	Choice Male Hottie	Orlando Bloom	Nominated
Teen Choice Awards	Choice Action Movie Actress	Keira Knightley	Nominated
Visual Effects Society Awards	Best Single Visual Effect of the Year	John Knoll, Ned Gorman, Jakub Pistecky, Tom Fejes	Won
Visual Effects Society Awards	Outstanding Animated Character in a Live Action Motion Picture	Steve Walton, Jung Seung Hong, Marc Chu, James Tooley	Won
Visual Effects Society Awards	Outstanding Compositing in a Motion Picture	Eddie Pasquarello, François Lambert, Jeff Sutherland, Tory Mercer	Won
Visual Effects Society Awards	Outstanding Created Environment in a Live Action Motion Picture	Chris Stoski, Susumu Yukuhiro, Jack Mongovan, Greg Salter	Won
Visual Effects Society Awards	Outstanding Models and Miniatures in a Motion Picture	Bruce Holcomb, Ron Woodall, Charlie Bailey, Carl Miller	Won
Visual Effects Society Awards	Outstanding Visual Effects in a Visual Effects Driven Motion Picture	John Knoll, Jill Brooks, Hal T. Hickel, Charles Gibson	Won
World Stunt Awards	Best Fight	Mark Aaron Wagner, Thomas DuPont, Tony Angelotti, Lisa Hoyle, Jeff Wolfe, Kirk Maxwell, Buddy Sosthand, Phil Culotta, Jeremy Fry, Tom Morga	Won
World Stunt Awards	Best High Work	Theo Kypri	Nominated
World Stunt Awards	Best High Work	Theo Kypri(nominated twice in the same category)	Nominated
Young Artist Awards	Best Family Feature Film – Drama	—	Nominated

== At World's End ==
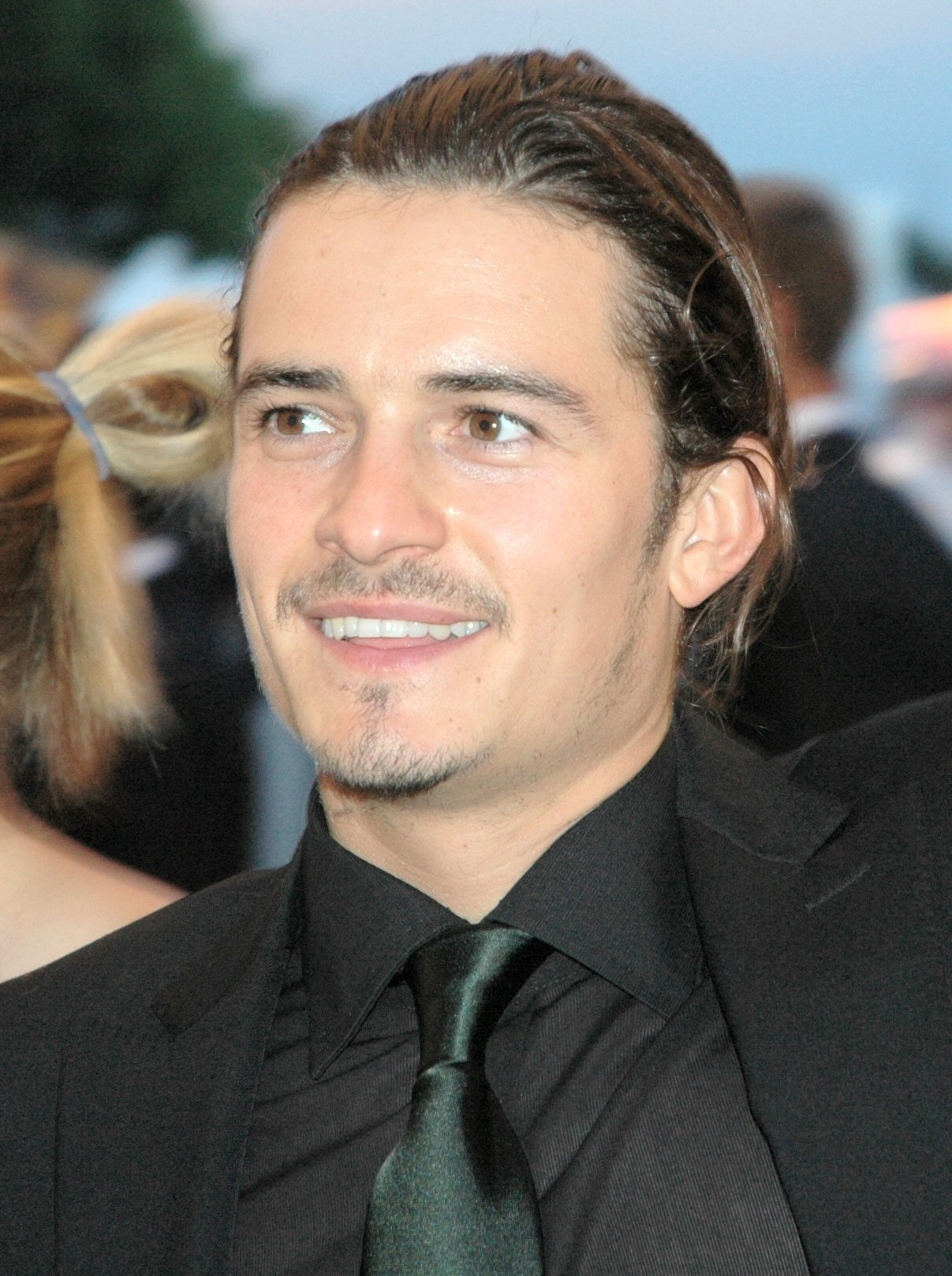
Orlando Bloom won a Teen Choice and a Kids' Choice Award for his portrayal of Will Turner, but was also nominated for a Razzie Award for Worst Supporting Actor.

The franchise's third film, At World's End, similarly to Dead Man's Chest, received a high gross, but mixed reviews, with Total Film magazine praising the performances but complaining that the "twists and exposition made it hard to care for the characters", and James Berardinelli found it to be the weakest of the trilogy as "the last hour offers adventure as rousing as anything provided in either of the previous installments... which doesn't account for the other 108 minutes of this gorged, self-indulgent, and uneven production". Gore Verbinski directed the film and the script was written by Ted Elliott and Terry Rossio. The plot follows Will Turner, Elizabeth Swann, and the crew of the Black Pearl rescuing Captain Jack Sparrow (Johnny Depp), from Davy Jones's Locker, and then preparing to fight the East India Trading Company, led by Cutler Beckett (Tom Hollander) and Davy Jones (Bill Nighy), who plan to extinguish piracy.

It was nominated for two Academy Awards, of which it won neither. It was also nominated for a BAFTA Award, a Costume Designers Guild Award, an Eddie Award, three Kids' Choice Awards (winning one), three MTV Movie Awards (winning one), four National Movie Awards, four Saturn Awards (winning one), one Screen Actors Guild Award, six Teen Choice Awards (winning five), seven Visual Effects Society Awards (winning two), and won two People's Choice Awards.

Award	Category	Recipients and nominees	Outcome
Academy Awards	Best Makeup	Ve Neill, Martin Samuel	Nominated
Academy Awards	Best Visual Effects	John Knoll, Hal T. Hickel, Charlie Gibson, John Frazier	Nominated
Art Directors Guild	Feature Film – Fantasy Film	John Dexter, Bruce Crone, William Hawkins, William Ladd Skinner, Nick Navarro, Eric Sundahl, Clint Wallace, Darrell L. Wight	Nominated
ASCAP	Film Music Composition of the Year – “Up Is Down”	Hans Zimmer	Won
ASCAP	Best Original Score for an Action/Adventure Feature Film	Hans Zimmer	Won
BAFTA Awards	Best Special Visual Effects	John Knoll, Charles Gibson, Hal T. Hickel, John Frazier	Nominated
Costume Designers Guild Awards	Excellence in Fantasy Film	Penny Rose	Nominated
Eddie Awards	Best Edited Feature Film – Comedy or Musical	Craig Wood and Stephen E. Rivkin	Nominated
Gold Derby Awards	Best Makeup/Hair	Ve Neill and Martin Samuel	Nominated
Gold Derby Awards	Best Visual Effects	John Frazier, Charles Gibson, Hal Hickel, and John Knoll	Nominated
Golden Reel Awards	Best Sound Editing – Dialogue and ADR for Feature Film	George Watters II, Christopher Boyes, Teri E. Dorman, Kimberly Harris, David A. Arnold, Gloria D'Alessandro, Lucy Coldsnow-Smith, Julie Feiner, Laura Graham, and Michele Perrone	Nominated
Golden Reel Awards	Best Sound Editing – Music in a Feature Film	Melissa Muik, Katie Greathouse, Barbara McDermott	Nominated
Golden Reel Awards	Best Sound Editing – Sound Effects and Foley for Feature Film	Christopher Boyes, George Watters II, Victoria Martin, Ken Fischer, Shannon Mills, J.R. Grubbs, Addison Teague, David C. Hughes, Matthew Harrison, James Likowski, Thomas W. Small, Timothy Nielsen, Christopher Scarabosio	Nominated
International Film Music Critics Association Awards	Best Original Score for an Action/Adventure Film	Hans Zimmer	Nominated
International Film Music Critics Association Awards	Film Music Composition of the Year	"Up Is Down" - Hans Zimmer	Nominated
Nickelodeon Kids' Choice Awards	Favorite Male Movie Star	Johnny Depp	Won
Nickelodeon Kids' Choice Awards	Favorite Female Movie Star	Keira Knightley	Nominated
Nickelodeon Kids' Choice Awards	Favorite Movie	—	Nominated
Mainichi Film Concours	Best Foreign Film	—	Won
MTV Movie Awards	Best Comedic Performance	Johnny Depp	Won
MTV Movie Awards	Best Female Performance	Keira Knightley	Nominated
MTV Movie Awards	Best Movie	—	Nominated
National Movie Awards	Best Family Film	—	Nominated
National Movie Awards	Best Performance by a Female	Keira Knightley	Nominated
National Movie Awards	Best Performance by a Male	Orlando Bloom	Nominated
National Movie Awards	Best Performance by a Male	Johnny Depp	Nominated
Nikkan Sports Film Awards	Best Foreign Film	—	Won
Online Film & Television Association Awards	Best Visual Effects	—	Nominated
People's Choice Awards	Best Movie	—	Won
People's Choice Awards	Best Threequel	—	Won
Razzie Awards	Worst Supporting Actor	Orlando Bloom	Nominated
Rembrandt Awards	Best International Actor (Beste Buitenlandse Acteur)	Johnny Depp	Won
Rembrandt Awards	Best International Film (Beste Buitenlandse Film)	Jerry Bruckheimer	Won
Satellite Awards	Best Sound	Christopher Boyes, Paul Massey, Lee Orloff, George Watters II	Nominated
Saturn Awards	Best Make-up	Ve Neill, Martin Samuel	Won
Saturn Awards	Best Costume	Penny Rose	Nominated
Saturn Awards	Best Fantasy Film	—	Nominated
Saturn Awards	Best Special Effects	John Knoll, Hal T. Hickel, Charles Gibson, John Frazier	Nominated
Scream Awards	Fantasy Hero	Johnny Depp	Won
Scream Awards	Best Cameo	Keith Richards	Won
Scream Awards	The Ultimate Scream	—	Nominated
Scream Awards	Best Fantasy Movie	—	Nominated
Scream Awards	Fantasy Fox	Keira Knightley	Nominated
Scream Awards	Best Sequel	—	Nominated
Scream Awards	Best F/X	—	Nominated
Screen Actors Guild Awards	Outstanding Performance by a Stunt Ensemble in a Motion Picture	^{See below}	Nominated
Teen Choice Awards	Choice Action Movie	—	Won
Teen Choice Awards	Choice Action Movie Actor	Johnny Depp	Won
Teen Choice Awards	Choice Action Movie Actress	Keira Knightley	Won
Teen Choice Awards	Choice Movie Liplock	Orlando Bloom, Keira Knightley	Won
Teen Choice Awards	Choice Movie Rumble	Orlando Bloom	Won
Teen Choice Awards	Choice Movie Villain	Bill Nighy	Won
Teen Choice Awards	Choice Action Movie Actor	Orlando Bloom	Nominated
Visual Effects Society Awards	Outstanding Animated Character in a Live Action Motion Picture	Hal T. Hickel, Marc Chu, Jakub Pistecky, Maia Kayser	Won
Visual Effects Society Awards	Outstanding Created Environment in a Live Action Motion Picture	Frank Losasso Petterson, Paul Sharpe, Joakim Arnesson, David Meny	Won
Visual Effects Society Awards	Best Single Visual Effect of the Year	John Knoll, Jill Brooks, François Lambert, Philippe Rebours	Nominated
Visual Effects Society Awards	Outstanding Compositing in a Motion Picture	Eddie Pasquarello, Katrin Klaiber, Jen Howard, Shawn Hillier	Nominated
Visual Effects Society Awards	Outstanding Compositing in a Motion Picture	Lou Pecora, Joel Behrens, Ted Andre, Kevin Lingenfelser	Nominated
Visual Effects Society Awards	Outstanding Models or Miniatures in a Motion Picture	Kenneth Bailey, Bruce Holcomb, Carl Miller, Geoff Heron	Nominated
Visual Effects Society Awards	Outstanding Visual Effects in a Visual Effects Driven Motion Picture	John Knoll, Jill Brooks, Hal T. Hickel, Charlie Gibson	Nominated

^"Outstanding Performance by a Stunt Ensemble in a Motion Picture" Nominees: George Marshall Ruge, Tsuyoshi Abe, Kevin Abercrombie, Joey Anaya, Tony Angelotti, Greg Anthony, Noby Arden, Sala Baker, Daniel W. Barringer, Brian Bennett, Richard L. Blackwell, Ben Bray, Dan Brown, Joe Bucaro III, Richard Bucher, Keith Campbell, Jay Caputo, Darryl Chan, Alex Chansky, Eric Chen, Fernando Chien, Ilram Choi, Arnold Chon, Brian Patrick Collins, Geovanny Corvera, Brycen Counts, Shawn Crowder, Phil Culotta, Mark De Alessandro, John Dixon, J. Mark Donaldson, John Donohue, Brian Duffy, Jayson Dumenigo, Thomas DuPont, Andy Dylan, Greg Wayne Elam, Kofi Elam, Paul Eliopoulos, Robert Elmore, Masaaki Endo, Jonathan Eusebio, Roel Failma, Dane Farwell, Jeremy Fry, Darin Fujimori, Richie Gaona, Mickey Giacomazzi, Erica Grace, Dean Grimes, Charles Grisham, Al Goto, Sam Hargrave, Zac Henry, Steven Ho, Lisa Hoyle, Randall Huber, Zach Hudson, Alex Huynh, Yoshio Iizuka, Keii Johnston, John Koyama, Anthony Kramme, Theo Kypri, Reuben Langdon, Danny Le Boyer, Don Lee, Michelle Lee, Will Leong, Christopher Leps, James Lew, Michael Li, Sam Looc, Kurt D. Lott, Ray Lykins, Rob Mars, Kirk Maxwell, Mark McDaniels, Lee McDermott, Angela Meryl, Norman Mora, Tom Morga, Marty Murray, Tadahiro Nakamura, Mark Norby, Phi-Long Nguyen, Hugh Aodh O'Brien, Casey O'Neill, Lin Oeding, Brad Orrison, Jen Sung Outerbridge, Jim Palmer, Norb Phillips, Víctor Quintero, Denney Pierce, J.P. Romano, Thomas Rosales Jr., Bill M. Ryusaki, Gregg Sargeant, Liane Schmidt, Marc Schaffer, Craig Frosty Silva, Lincoln Simonds, Buddy Sosthand, Gary Ray Stearns, Jim Stephan, Don Tai, Lewis Tan, Philip Tan, Steve Tartalia, Bryan Thompson, Trampas Thompson, Aaron Toney, Russell Towery, Steve Upton, Xuyen Valdivia, Jon Valera, Mark Vanselow, David Wald, Mike Watson, Ryan Watson, Jack West, Webster Whinery, Webster P. Whinery Jr., Brian J. Williams, Jeff Wolfe, Adrienne Wong, Kerry Wong, Phillip Wong, Emily Wu, Kofi Yiadom, Marcus Young

== On Stranger Tides ==
The franchise's fourth film, On Stranger Tides received a high gross, but mixed reviews, with Mark Kermode giving the film an overwhelmingly negative review on his BBC Radio 5 Live show, saying "it's not as staggeringly misjudged as the third part, because it is just nothing, it is just a big empty nothing". However, Box Office Magazine's Pete Hammond called it "The Best Pirate Outing Yet!" and praised the director for bringing "an almost lyrical grace to the mayhem". It was directed by Rob Marshall, written by Ted Elliott and Terry Rossio, and produced by Jerry Bruckheimer. In the film, Captain Jack Sparrow (Johnny Depp) is joined by Angelica (Penélope Cruz) in his search for the Fountain of Youth, confronting the infamous pirate Blackbeard (Ian McShane).

Award	Category	Recipients and nominees	Outcome
ALMA Awards	Favorite Movie Actress - Drama/Adventure	Penélope Cruz	Nominated
Annie Awards	Animated Effects in a Live Action Production	Industrial Light & Magic	Nominated
Art Directors Guild Awards	Fantasy Feature Film	John Myhre	Nominated
Artios Awards	Big Budget Feature - Comedy	Francine Maisler	Nominated
Cinema Audio Society Awards	Outstanding Achievement in Sound Mixing for a Motion Picture	Lee Orloff, Paul Massey, Christopher Boyes, and Alan Meyerson	Nominated
Costume Designers Guild Awards	Excellence in Fantasy Film	Penny Rose	Nominated
Evening Standard British Film Awards	Blockbuster of the Year - People's Choice	—	Nominated
Empire Awards	Best Male Newcomer	Sam Claflin	Nominated
Golden Trailer Awards	Summer 2011 Blockbuster Trailer	Create Advertising Group	Nominated
Golden Trailer Awards	Best Summer Blockbuster 2011 TV Spot	Create Advertising Group	Nominated
Hollywood Film Awards	Hollywood Movie Award	—	Nominated
MovieGuide Awards	Best Movie for Mature Audiences	—	Won
Scream Awards	Best Chase Scene	Chase Through London	Won
Scream Awards	Best Fantasy Movie	—	Nominated
Scream Awards	Best Fantasy Actress	Penélope Cruz	Nominated
Scream Awards	Best Fantasy Actor	Johnny Depp	Nominated
Scream Awards	Best Cameo	Keith Richards	Nominated
Teen Choice Awards	Choice Sci-Fi/Fantasy Movie Actor	Johnny Depp	Nominated
Teen Choice Awards	Choice Sci-Fi/Fantasy Movie Actress	Penélope Cruz	Nominated
Teen Choice Awards	Choice Sci-Fi/Fantasy Movie	—	Nominated
Teen Choice Awards	Choice Movie Villain	Ian McShane	Nominated
People's Choice Awards	Favorite Movie	—	Nominated
People's Choice Awards	Favorite Ensemble Movie Cast	—	Nominated
Nickelodeon Kids Choice Awards	Favorite Movie Actor	Johnny Depp	Nominated
Visual Effects Society Awards	Outstanding Visual Effects in a Visual Effects-Driven Feature Motion Picture	Gary Brozenich, David Conley, Charlie Gibson, and Ben Snow	Nominated

== Dead Men Tell No Tales ==
Award	Date of ceremony	Category	Recipient(s)	Result	Ref.
Golden Raspberry Awards	March 3, 2018	Worst Actor	Johnny Depp	Nominated	
Golden Raspberry Awards	March 3, 2018	Worst Supporting Actor	Javier Bardem	Nominated	
Golden Raspberry Awards	March 3, 2018	Worst Screen Combo	Johnny Depp and his worn-out drunk routine	Nominated	
Hollywood Professional Association Awards	November 16, 2017	Outstanding Visual Effects: Feature Film	Gary Brozenich, Sheldon Stopsack, Patrick Ledda, Richard Clegg, Richard Little	Nominated	
Movieguide Awards	2018	Best Movie for Mature Audiences	Pirates of the Caribbean: Dead Men Tell No Tales	Nominated	
Taurus World Stunt Awards	2018	Best Stunt Rigging	Brycen Counts, Chris Daniels, David Hugghins, Michael Hansen, Andy Owen	Won	
Teen Choice Awards	August 13, 2017	Choice Movie: Action	Pirates of the Caribbean: Dead Men Tell No Tales	Nominated	
Teen Choice Awards	August 13, 2017	Choice Movie Actor: Action	Brenton Thwaites	Nominated	
Teen Choice Awards	August 13, 2017	Choice Movie Actor: Action	Johnny Depp	Nominated	
Teen Choice Awards	August 13, 2017	Choice Movie Actress: Action	Kaya Scodelario	Nominated	
Teen Choice Awards	August 13, 2017	Choice Movie: Villain	Javier Bardem	Nominated	
Teen Choice Awards	August 13, 2017	Choice Movie: Summer	Pirates of the Caribbean: Dead Men Tell No Tales	Nominated	
Teen Choice Awards	August 13, 2017	Choice Liplock	Orlando Bloom and Keira Knightley	Nominated	
