= Visual Effects Society Award for Outstanding Virtual Cinematography in a CG Project =

Annual US visual effects award

The Visual Effects Society Award for Outstanding Virtual Cinematography in a CG Project is one of the annual awards given by the Visual Effects Society. The award goes to artists whose work in virtual cinematography. It was first awarded in 2003 and 2004 for, under the title "Best Visual Effects Photography in a Motion Picture", before being scrapped from the ceremony. The award was given separately to artists in live-action film, animated film, and commercials/television. These categories were first awarded in 2012. The following year, the category specifically awarding animated film was dropped, with only live-action film and commercial/television being awarded. In 2015, only live-action films were awarded. The following year, the category's title changed to "Outstanding Virtual Cinematography in a Photoreal Project". It has held its current title since 2020.

== 2000s ==
Best Visual Effects Photography in a Motion Picture

Year	Film	Nominee(s)
2002	The Lord of the Rings: The Two Towers	Alex Funke, Brian Van't Hul, Richard Bluck
2002	Star Wars: Episode II – Attack of the Clones	Patrick Sweeney, Marty Rosenberg, Carl Miller, Fred Meyers
2002	Stuart Little 2	Earl Wiggins, Mark Vargo, Tom Houghton, Anna Foerster
2003	The Matrix Reloaded (U-Cap Facial Photography)	Kim Libreri, George Borshukov, Paul Ryan, John Gaeta
2003	The Lord of the Rings: The Return of the King	Alex Funke, Rob Kerr, Henk Prins
2003	Pirates of the Caribbean: The Curse of the Black Pearl	Carl Miller, Mike Conte, Tami Carter
2003	Terminator 3: Rise of the Machines	Pat Sweeney, Mike Bienstock, Grady Cofer, John Hansen

== 2010s ==
=== Outstanding Virtual Cinematography in a Live Action Feature Motion Picture ===
Year	Film	Nominee(s)
2011	Hugo	Martin Chamney, Rob Legato, Adam Watkins, Fabio Zangla
2011	Rise of the Planet of the Apes	Thelvin Cabezas, Mike Perry, R. Christopher White, Erik Winquist
2011	Thor	Xavier Allard, Pierre Buffin, Nicolas Chevallier
2011	Transformers: Dark of the Moon	Michael Balog, Richard Bluff, Shawn Kelly, Jeff White
2012	The Hobbit: An Unexpected Journey	Matt Aitken, Victor Huang, Christian Rivers, R. Christopher White
2012	The Amazing Spider-Man	Rob Engle, David Schaub, Cosku Turhan, Max Tyrie
2012	The Avengers (Downtown Manhattan)	Colin Benoit, Jeremy Goldman, Tory Mercer, Roger Liu
2012	Total Recall (Hover Car Pursuit)	Daniel Baldwin, Mattias Forsstrom, Sam Schwier, Joshua Wassung
2013	Gravity	Tim Webber, Emmanuel Lubezki, Richard McBride, Dale Newton
2013	The Hobbit: The Desolation of Smaug	Christian Rivers, Phil Barrenger, Mark Gee, Thelvin Cabezas
2013	Iron Man 3	Mark Smith, Aaron Gilman, Thelvin Cabezas, Gerardo Ramirez
2013	Man of Steel	Daniel Paulsson, Edmund Kolloen, Joel Prager, David Stripinis
2013	Pacific Rim (Hong Kong Ocean Fight)	Colin Benoit, Nick Walker, Adam Schnitzer, Victor Schutz

=== Outstanding Virtual Cinematography in an Animated Feature Motion Picture ===
Year	Film	Nominee(s)
2011	Rango	Colin Benoit, Philippe Rebours, Nelson Sepulveda, Nick Walker
2011	The Adventures of Tintin	Matt Aitken, Matthias Menz, Keith F. Miller, Wayne Stables
2011	Arthur Christmas	Jericca Cleland, Michael Ford, David Morehead, Emi Tahira
2011	Cars 2	Mahyar Abousaeedi, Sharon Calahan, Jeremy Lasky, Jonathan Pytko

=== Outstanding Virtual Cinematography in a Broadcast Program or Commercial ===
Year	Commercial/Program	Nominee(s)
2011	Gears of War 3: Dust to Dust	Niles Heckman, Richard Morton, Vernon Wilbert Jr.
2011	Ghost Recon: Future Soldier "Camo Up"	Matt Aitken, Matthias Menz, Keith F. Miller, Wayne Stables
2011	Hot Wheels	Steve Beck, Robert Sethi, Felix Urquiza
2011	Once Upon a Time (Cinderella's Courtyard)	Stephen Jackson, Sallyanne Massimini, Nathan Matsuda, Kevin Struckman
2012	ZombiU	Dominique Boidin, Léon Bérelle, Rémi Kozyra, Maxime Luère
2012	Call of Duty - Eclipse: Surprise	Chris Bayol, Steve Beck, Chris Knight, Robert Sethi
2012	Halo 4: Forward Unto Dawn	Colin Benoit, Jeremy Goldman, Tory Mercer, Roger Liu
2012	Toyota: Real Deal	Adam Berg, Niles Heckman, Ronald Herbst, Vernon Wilbert

=== Outstanding Virtual Cinematography in a Live-Action Commercial or Broadcast Program ===
Year	Commercial/Program	Nominee(s)
2013	The Crew	Dominique Boidin, Rémi Kozyra, Léon Bérelle, Maxime Luère
2013	Mad Max: Ethos	Aladino Debert, Neil Huxley, David Liu, Michael Harbour
2013	Murdered: Soul Suspect	Vernon Wilbert, Tim Jones, Rafael Colon, April Warren
2013	Qualcomm Snapdragon: A Dragon is Coming	Joshua Wassung, Shannon Justison, Shayne Ryan, Seth Gollub

=== Outstanding Virtual Cinematography in a Photoreal/Live Action Feature Motion Picture ===
Year	Film	Piece	Nominee(s)
2014	X-Men: Days of Future Past	Kitchen Scene	Austin Bonang, Casey Schatz, Dennis Jones, Newton Thomas Sigel
2014	Dawn of the Planet of the Apes		Keith Miller, Jonathan Paquin, Alessandro Saponi, David Houghton Williams
2014	Edge of Tomorrow	Beach and Paris Attacks	Albert Cheng, Jose Enrique Astacio Jr., Michael Havart, Dion Beebe
2014	Interstellar	Tesseract	Faraz Hameed, Stephen Painter, Hoyte van Hoytema, Dorian Knapp

=== Outstanding Virtual Cinematography in a Photoreal Project ===
Year	Film/Program	Piece	Nominee(s)
2015	Star Wars: The Force Awakens	Falcon Chase/Graveyard	Paul Kavanagh, Colin Benoit, Susumu Yukuhiro, Greg Salter
2015	Ant-Man	Macro Action	James Baker, Alex Kahn, Thomas Luff, Rebecca Baehler
2015	Mission: Impossible – Rogue Nation	Underwater Torus Chamber	Vincent Aupetit, Margaux Durand-Rival, Christopher Anciaume, Robert Elswit
2015	The Walk	Towers Walk	Shawn Hull, Suzanne Cipolletti, Laurent Taillefer, Dariusz Wolski
2016	The Jungle Book		Bill Pope, Robert Legato, Gary Roberts, John Brennan
2016	Doctor Strange	New York Mirror Dimension	Landis Fields, Mathew Cowie, Frederic Medioni, Faraz Hameed
2016	Game of Thrones: "Battle of the Bastards"		Patrick Tiberius Gehlen, Michelle Blok, Christopher Baird, Drew Wood-Davies
2016	Rogue One: A Star Wars Story	Space Battle	John Levin, Euisung Lee, Steve Ellis, Barry Howell
2017	Guardians of the Galaxy Vol. 2	Groot Dance/Opening Fight	James Baker, Steven Lo, Alvise Avati, Robert Stipp
2017	Beauty and the Beast	Be Our Guest	Shannon Justison, Casey Schatz, Neil Weatherley, Claire Michaud
2017	Star Wars: The Last Jedi	Crait Surface Battle	Cameron Nielsen, Albert Cheng, John Levin, Johanes Kurnia
2017	Thor: Ragnarok	Valkyrie's Flashback	Hubert Maston, Arthur Moody, Adam Paschke, Casey Schatz
2018	Ready Player One	New York Race	Daniele Bigi, Edmund Kolloen, Mathieu Vig, Jean-Baptiste Noyau
2018	Aquaman	Third Act Battle	Claus Pedersen, Mohammad Rastkar, Cedric Lo, Ryan McCoy
2018	Echo	Time Displacement	Victor Perez, Tomas Tjernberg, Tomas Wall, Marcus Dineen
2018	Jurassic World: Fallen Kingdom	Gyrosphere Escape	Pawl Fulker, Matt Perrin, Oscar Faura, David Vickery
2018	Welcome to Marwen	Town of Marwen	C. Kim Miles, Matthew A. Ward, Ryan Beagan, Marc Chu

=== Outstanding Virtual Cinematography in a CG Project ===
Year	Film/Program	Piece	Nominee(s)
2019	The Lion King		Robert Legato, Caleb Deschanel, Ben Grossmann, AJ Sciutto
2019	Alita: Battle Angel		Emile Ghorayeb, Simon Jung, Nick Epstein, Mike Perry
2019	The Mandalorian: "Chapter 6: The Prisoner"	The Roost	Richard Bluff, Jason Porter, Landis R. Fields IV, Barry "Baz" Idoine
2019	Toy Story 4		Jean-Claude Kalache, Patrick Lin

== 2020s ==
Year	Project	Piece	Nominee(s)
2020	Soul		Matt Aspbury, Ian Megibben
2020	Ghost of Tsushima	A Storm is Coming	Aladino Debert, Matt Dougan, Eric Beaver, David Liu
2020	The Mandalorian: "Chapter 12: The Siege"		Dave Crispino, Kyle Winkelman, Paul Kavanagh, Jose Burgos
2020	The Mandalorian: "Chapter 15: The Believer"		Richard Bluff, Matthew Jensen, Chris Williams, Landis Fields IV
2021	Encanto	We Don't Talk About Bruno	Nathan Detroit Warner, Dorian Bustamante, Tyler Kupferer, Michael Woodside
2021	Godzilla vs. Kong	Ocean Battle	Shawn Hull, Robert Wiese, Steven Tom, Eric Petey
2021	Loki: Lamentis	Race to the Ark	Jesse Lewis-Evans, Luke Avery, Autumn Durald Arkapaw, Scott Inkster
2021	Raya and the Last Dragon		Rob Dressel, Adolph Lusinsky, Paul Felix
2021	Shang-Chi and the Legend of the Ten Rings		Sebastian Trujillo, Louis-Daniel Poulin, Nathan Abbot, Shannon Justison
2022	Avatar: The Way of Water		Richard Baneham, Dan Cox, Eric Reynolds, A.J Briones
2022	ABBA Voyage		Pär M. Ekberg, John Galloway, Paolo Acri, Jose Burgos
2022	The Batman	Rain Soaked Car Chase	Dennis Yoo, Michael J. Hall, Jason Desjarlais, Ben Bigiel
2022	Prehistoric Planet		Daniel Fotheringham, Krzysztof Szczepanski, Wei-Chaun Hsu, Claire Hill
2023	Guardians of the Galaxy Vol. 3		Joanna Davison, Cheyana Wilkinson, Michael Cozens, Jason Desjarlais
2023	The Creator		Roel Coucke, Christopher Potter, Amanda Johnstone-Batt, Jeremy Bloch
2023	Migration		Guylo Homsy, Damien Bapst, Antoine Collet, David Dangin
2023	Spider-Man: Across the Spider-Verse		Rich Turner, Randolph Lizarda, Daniela Campos Little, Thomas Campos
