= Eric Reynolds =

Eric Reynolds may refer to:

- Eric Reynolds (comics), American cartoonist, critic and comics editor
- Eric Reynolds (fighter) (born 1986), American mixed martial arts fighter
- Eric Reynolds (visual effects), Academy Award nominated visual effects supervisor
