= Jim Mitchell (visual effects artist) =

American visual effects artist

- Occupation: Visual effects artist

Jim Mitchell is an American visual effects artist. He was nominated for an Academy Award in the category Best Visual Effects for the film Mighty Joe Young. Mitchell has also been nominated for three British Academy Film Awards in the category Best Special Visual Effects.

== Selected filmography ==
=== Academy Award Nomination ===
- Mighty Joe Young (1998; co-nominated with Rick Baker, Hoyt Yeatman and Allen Hall)

=== British Academy Film Award Nominations ===
- Sleepy Hollow (1999; co-nominated with Kevin Yagher, Joss Williams and Paddy Eason)
- Harry Potter and the Chamber of Secrets (2002; co-nominated with Nick Davis, John Richardson, Bill George and Nick Dudman)
- Harry Potter and the Goblet of Fire (2005; co-nominated with John Richardson, Tim Webber and Tim Alexander)
