= Mohen Leo =

German visual effects artist

- Born: Mohen Ardnt Leo; Berlin, Germany
- Occupation: Visual effects supervisor
- Years active: 1997–present

Mohen Leo is a German visual effects artist.

Leo has worked on films since 1997, he received a nomination at the 89th Academy Awards in the category of Best Visual Effects. This was for the film Rogue One: A Star Wars Story. His nomination was shared with Neil Corbould, Hal Hickel and John Knoll.

Leo earned a nomination and win at the 77th Primetime Creative Arts Emmy Awards for Outstanding Special Visual Effects In A Season Or A Movie, for his work on the second season of the Disney+ TV series Andor.
