= Grady Cofer =

American visual effects artist

- Occupation: Visual effects artist

Grady Cofer is an American visual effects artist. He was nominated for an Academy Award in the category Best Visual Effects for the film Ready Player One.

== Selected filmography ==
- Ready Player One (2018; co-nominated with Roger Guyett, Matthew E. Butler and Dave Shirk)
