= Allen Hall (special effects artist) =

American special effects artist (born 1946)

- Born: May 4, 1946 (age 80); Salt Lake City, Utah, U.S.
- Occupation: Visual effects artist
- Years active: 1979–present

Allen Hall (born May 4, 1946) is an American special effects artist who has won two Academy Awards and two BAFTA awards.

As of 2014, he has 65 film credits since he began his career in 1979.

== Oscar history ==
(In the category Best Visual Effects)

- 1991 Academy Awards-Backdraft, nomination shared with Scott Farrar, Clay Pinney and Mikael Salomon. Lost to Terminator 2: Judgment Day.
- 1994 Academy Awards-Forrest Gump, shared with George Murphy, Ken Ralston and Stephen Rosenbaum. Won.
- 1998 Academy Awards-Mighty Joe Young, nomination shared with Rick Baker, Jim Mitchell and Hoyt Yeatman. Lost to What Dreams May Come.
- 2006 Academy Awards-Pirates of the Caribbean: Dead Man's Chest, shared with Charles Gibson, Hal Hickel and John Knoll. Won.

== Selected filmography ==
- 300: Rise of an Empire (2014)
- Man of Steel (2013)
- Pirates of the Caribbean: At World's End (2007)
- Pirates of the Caribbean: Dead Man's Chest (2006)
- Terminator 3: Rise of the Machines (2003)
- How the Grinch Stole Christmas (2000)
- U-571 (2000)
- Babe: Pig in the City (1998)
- Contact (1997)
- Forrest Gump (1994)
- Backdraft (1991)
- Top Gun (1986)
- The Man with Two Brains (1983)
- Popeye (1980)
