= Stephen Rosenbaum =

American film visual effects supervisor

- Rosenbaum visiting Vietnam in 2016

Stephen Rosenbaum is an American visual effects artist and supervisor, and has worked on numerous movie, TV and music productions, including six that have won Academy Awards. He has been nominated three times for an Academy Award and two times for a BAFTA Award. He has won both awards twice for his contributions on Forrest Gump and Avatar, and has played artist and supervisor roles on such pioneering films as Jurassic Park, Terminator 2: Judgment Day, The Abyss, X2: X-Men United, Death Becomes Her, Contact and The Perfect Storm.

== Personal life ==
Rosenbaum was raised in Los Angeles and graduated from Palisades Charter High School where he met and eventually married his high school sweetheart. He graduated from University of California, Berkeley, and remains a Bay Area, California resident.

== Career ==
Rosenbaum began his career in visual effects at the reconstructed Computer Graphics Department of Lucasfilm's effects division Industrial Light & Magic in 1989. The previous members of this department moved to the building next door and formed the company Pixar. This new group of artists received their first chance to make a computer generated character when James Cameron asked them to create the Pseudopod water creature for The Abyss. Cameron followed with Terminator 2: Judgment Day and the group expanded the artist base and created one of the first digital manipulations of a human character. The artists continued to thrive with opportunities to animate and render the seminal dinosaurs in Jurassic Park. Rosenbaum then oversaw the digital excision of Lt. Dan's legs, Forrest's mastery of ping pong, and the fanciful feather animations in Forrest Gump. These movies help spark the rapid evolution of traditional film-processed visual effects and inspired an industry-wide shift in filmmaking methodologies and commercial digital imagery manipulation.

Rosenbaum spent several years working on various projects at Weta Digital, and in 2007, he began work on Avatar. For two years, Rosenbaum worked with Cameron in Los Angeles during performance capture and in New Zealand during live action photography. For the third year of the project he returned to New Zealand to help complete the CGI on the movie.

Since Avatar, Rosenbaum has been immersed in Virtual Production and the persistent drive toward realtime visual effects and more believable digital characters. His focus has been on capturing and faithfully reproducing actor performances of recognized personalities, including famous musicians such as Michael Jackson and the band ABBA.

In 2010, Rosenbaum was hired by Digital Domain to start a character animation development group. He brought together some of the best computer graphics geeks, and they built a modernized approach to creating physically and behaviorally realistic digital humans and creatures. Leveraging the new pipeline, he designed and supervised the giants for the movie Jack the Giant Slayer.

In 2014, Rosenbaum directed the creation of a virtual Michael Jackson posthumously performing a previously unreleased song live at 2014 Billboard Music Awards. He then spent the next two years creating the reimagined King Kong for the movie Kong: Skull Island.

Rosenbaum then partnered with acclaimed music luminary Simon Fuller to recreate the band ABBA as their younger digital selves performing a new song. He established a virtual musician production company of 50 plus, built a cloud-first production pipeline, and in 2018 they completed an eight-minute promotional video of the photo-real virtual band members talking and singing.

== Filmography ==
- Kong: Skull Island (2017) (Visual Effects Supervisor: Legendary Pictures)
- Slave to the Rhythm (2014) (Visual Effects Supervisor)
- Jack the Giant Slayer (2013) (Visual Effects Supervisor: Digital Domain)
- Avatar (2009) (Visual Effects Supervisor: Weta Digital)
- The Water Horse (2007) (On-set Visual Effects Supervisor: Weta Digital)
- The Shaggy Dog (2006) (Visual Effects Supervisor: Walt Disney Pictures)
- The Chronicles of Riddick (2004) (Visual Effects Supervisor: Universal Pictures)
- I, Robot (2004) (On-set Visual Effects Supervisor: Weta Digital)
- X2: X-Men United (2003) (Visual Effects Supervisor: Cinesite)
- K-19: The Widowmaker (2002) (Visual Effects Supervisor: National Geographic Films)
- Big Trouble (2002) (Visual Effects Supervisor: Industrial Light & Magic)
- The Perfect Storm (2000) (Visual Effects Supervisor: Industrial Light & Magic)
- Snow Falling on Cedars (1999) (Visual Effects Supervisor: Industrial Light & Magic)
- Snow Falling on Cedars (1999) (Visual Effects Supervisor: Sony Pictures Imageworks)
- The Postman (1997) (Visual Effects Supervisor: Sony Pictures Imageworks)
- Contact (1997) (Visual Effects Supervisor: Sony Pictures Imageworks)
- Michael (1996) (Visual Effects Supervisor: Sony Pictures Imageworks)
- DreamWorks (Logo) (1995) (Computer Graphics Supervisor: Industrial Light & Magic)
- The Indian in the Cupboard (1995) (Computer Graphics Supervisor: Industrial Light & Magic)
- Disclosure (1994) (Computer Graphics Artist: Industrial Light & Magic)
- Forrest Gump (1994) (Computer Graphics Supervisor: Industrial Light & Magic)
- Jurassic Park (1993) (Computer Graphics Artist: Industrial Light & Magic)
- Death Becomes Her (1992) (Computer Graphics Artist: Industrial Light & Magic)
- Memoirs of an Invisible Man (film) (1992) (Computer Graphics Artist:Industrial Light & Magic)
- Terminator 2: Judgment Day (1991) (Computer Graphics Artist: Industrial Light & Magic)
- The Hunt for Red October (film) (1990) (Computer Graphics Artist: Industrial Light & Magic)
- Back to the Future Part II (1989) (Computer Graphics Artist: Industrial Light & Magic)
- The Abyss (1989) (Computer Graphics Artist: Industrial Light & Magic)

== Awards and nominations ==
=== Academy Award ===
- 2018 Oscar – nominee for Best Visual Effects – Kong: Skull Island (2017)
- 2010 Oscar – winner for Best Visual Effects – Avatar (2009)
- 1995 Oscar – winner for Best Visual Effects – Forrest Gump (1994)

=== BAFTA ===
- 2010 BAFTA Film Award – winner for best Special Visual Effects – Avatar (2009)
- 1995 BAFTA Film Award – winner for best Special Visual Effects – Forrest Gump (1994)

=== Academy of Science Fiction, Fantasy & Horror Films ===
- 2010 Saturn Award – winner for Best Special Effects – Avatar (2009)
- 2004 Saturn Award – nominee for Best Special Effects – X2: X-Men United (2003)
- 1998 Saturn Award – nominee for Best Special Effects – Contact (1997)
