= Terry Frazee =

- Other names: Terry D. Frazee
- Occupation: Visual effects artist
- Years active: 1973-2004

Terry Frazee is an American special effects artist. He was nominated at the 76th Academy Awards in the category of Best Visual Effects for his work on Pirates of the Caribbean: The Curse of the Black Pearl. He shared his nomination with Charles Gibson, Hal Hickel and John Knoll.

== Selected filmography ==
- Buffalo Bill and the Indians, or Sitting Bull's History Lesson (1976)
- 1941 (1979)
- The Legend of the Lone Ranger (1981)
- Blade Runner (1982)
- The Blob (1988)
- Return of the Living Dead Part II (1988)
- Ghost (1990)
- Lord of the Flies (1990)
- Star Trek VI: The Undiscovered Country (1991)
- Hocus Pocus (1993)
- Star Trek Generations (1994)
- Heat (1995)
- Strange Days (1995)
- Tall Tale
- Star Trek: First Contact (1996)
- Air Force One (1997)
- The Postman (1997)
- Star Trek: Insurrection (1998)
- Mystery Men (1999)
- The One (2001)
- Star Trek: Nemesis (2002)
- Pirates of the Caribbean: The Curse of the Black Pearl (2003)
