= John Knoll =

American computer graphics professional (born 1962)

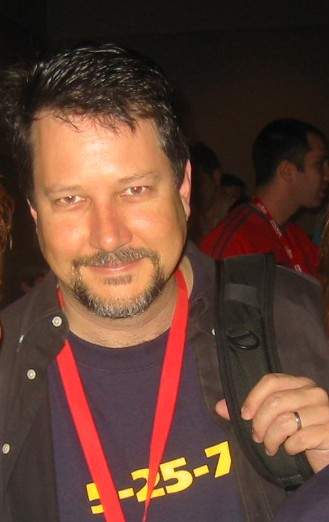
- Knoll in 2007
- Born: October 6, 1962 (age 63); Ann Arbor, Michigan, U.S.
- Education: USC School of Cinematic Arts
- Occupations: Visual effects supervisor, chief creative officer (CCO)
- Spouse: Jennifer Knoll
- Children: 4
- Relatives: Thomas Knoll (brother)

John Knoll (born October 6, 1962) is an American visual effects supervisor and chief creative officer (CCO) at Industrial Light & Magic (ILM).

== Career ==
One of the original creators of Adobe Photoshop (along with his brother, Thomas Knoll), he has also worked as visual effects supervisor on the Star Wars prequels and the 1997 special editions of the original trilogy. He also served as ILM's visual effects supervisor for Star Trek Generations and Star Trek: First Contact, as well as the Pirates of the Caribbean series. Along with Hal Hickel, Charles Gibson and Allen Hall, Knoll and the trio's work on Pirates of the Caribbean: Dead Man's Chest earned them the Academy Award for Best Visual Effects.

Knoll has been praised by directors James Cameron, Gore Verbinski, Guillermo del Toro, and Brad Bird. Del Toro, who worked with Knoll for the first time on Pacific Rim, stated "He basically has the heart of a kid and the mind of a scientist, and that's a great combination."

Knoll is also the inventor of Knoll Light Factory, a lens flare generating software inspired by his work at Industrial Light and Magic. He was the Computer Graphics Project Designer on The Abyss, an achievement which earned ILM its tenth Oscar, and worked on two Star Trek episodes: Star Trek: The Next Generation's pilot episode ("Encounter at Farpoint") and the Star Trek: Deep Space Nine episode "Explorers".

Knoll had a cameo appearance in Star Wars Episode I: The Phantom Menace as a fighter pilot, helped pitch the story of Rogue One, a feature film set in the Star Wars series, for which he also worked as writer and executive producer.

John Knoll reflected on his work with George Lucas on the Star Wars prequel trilogy: "I still feel like I owe George a lot to have been given that opportunity. On those three films, I feel like I got a whole career's worth of experience packed into eight years. George never constricted his thinking to what he knew for sure the tools were capable of; his attitude was, "Yeah, well, I'm writing what I want to see, so you guys will figure it out." I loved that he would constantly throw those challenges out with the confidence [that] you guys will figure it out. That was great."

In 2016, John Knoll and his brother Thomas were inducted into the International Photography Hall of Fame and Museum.

At the 2019 Oscars, John and his brother Thomas were awarded a Scientific and Engineering Award for the original architecture, design and development of Photoshop.

== Filmography ==
=== Film ===
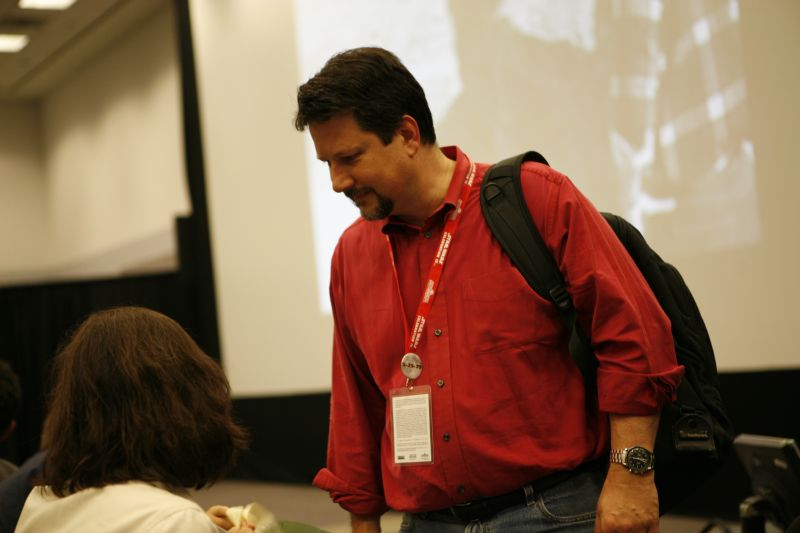
John Knoll visits the 5-25-77 panel, 2007

Year	Title	Notes
1986	Captain EO	Motion control camera operator
1986	Jared: The Movie	Motion control camera operator
1987	Empire of the Sun	Motion control camera operator
1987	Innerspace	Motion control camera operator
1988	Willow	Motion control camera operator
1989	The Abyss	CG supervisor
1990	Spaced Invaders	visual effects supervisor
1990	The Hunt for Red October	visual effects supervisor
1991	Hook	visual effects supervisor
1991	Hudson Hawk	visual effects supervisor
1994	Baby's Day Out	visual effects supervisor
1994	Star Trek Generations	visual effects supervisor
1996	Mission: Impossible	visual effects supervisor
1996	Star Trek: First Contact	Visual effects supervisor
1999	Star Wars: Episode I – The Phantom Menace	Visual effects supervisor, onscreen cameo
1999	Deep Blue Sea	Visual effects supervisor
2000	Mission to Mars	visual effects supervisor
2002	Star Wars: Episode II – Attack of the Clones	Visual effects supervisor
2003	Pirates of the Caribbean: The Curse of the Black Pearl	Visual effects supervisor
2005	Star Wars: Episode III – Revenge of the Sith	Visual effects supervisor
2006	Pirates of the Caribbean: Dead Man's Chest	Visual effects supervisor
2007	Pirates of the Caribbean: At World's End	Visual effects supervisor
2008	Speed Racer	Visual effects supervisor
2009	Confessions of a Shopaholic	Visual effects supervisor
2009	Harry Potter and the Half-Blood Prince	Digital artist
2009	Avatar	Visual effects supervisor
2011	Super 8	Digital artist
2011	Rango	Visual effects supervisor
2011	Hugo	Visual effects supervisor
2011	Mission: Impossible – Ghost Protocol	Visual effects supervisor
2013	Pacific Rim	Visual effects supervisor
2015	Tomorrowland	Visual effects supervisor
2016	Rogue One: A Star Wars Story	Visual effects supervisor, executive producer, story
2018	Ready Player One	Visual effects production
2018	The Other Side of the Wind	Visual effects supervisor
2018	Aquaman	Production and technical support
2019	6 Underground	Additional visual effects supervisor
2021	Jungle Cruise	Visual effects supervisor
2022	The Batman	Visual effects production
2023	Indiana Jones and the Dial of Destiny	Additional visual effects supervisor
2026	The Mandalorian and Grogu	Visual effects supervisor

=== Television ===
Year	Title	Notes
1987	Star Trek: The Next Generation	Motion control camera operator
2019-2023	The Mandalorian	Additional visual effects supervisor
2021-2022	The Book of Boba Fett	Senior visual effects supervisor
2024-2025	Star Wars: Skeleton Crew	Visual effects supervisor

== Awards ==
Year	Organisation	Work	Category/award	Co-nominees	Result	Ref.
2019	91st Academy Awards	Photoshop	Scientific and Engineering	Thomas Knoll and Mark Hamburg	Won	
2017	89th Academy Awards	Rogue One	Visual Effects	Mohen Leo, Hal Hickel and Neil Corbould	Nominated	
2008	80th Academy Awards	Pirates of the Caribbean: At World's End	Visual Effects	Hal Hickel, Charles Gibson and John Frazier	Nominated	
2007	79th Academy Awards	Pirates of the Caribbean: Dead Man's Chest	Visual Effects	Hal Hickel, Charles Gibson and Allen Hall	Won	
2004	76th Academy Awards	Pirates of the Caribbean: The Curse of the Black Pearl	Visual Effects	Hal Hickel, Charles Gibson and Terry Frazee	Nominated	
2003	75th Academy Awards	Star Wars: Episode II – Attack of the Clones	Visual Effects	Rob Coleman, Pablo Helman and Ben Snow	Nominated	
2000	72nd Academy Awards	Star Wars: Episode I – The Phantom Menace	Visual Effects	Dennis Muren, Scott Squires and Rob Coleman	Nominated	

== Books ==
- John Knoll, J. W. Rinzler: Creating the Worlds of Star Wars: 365 Days with CDROM; Book about the Making of the Star Wars Saga; ISBN 0-8109-5936-4
