= Richard Baneham =

Irish animator and visual effects supervisor

- Born: 1970 or 1971 (age 55–56); Tallaght, Dublin, Ireland
- Occupations: Animator, supervisor
- Awards: 3 VES Awards (2003, 2010, 2018), 1 BAFTA (2010), 3 Oscars (2010, 2023, 2026)

Richard Baneham (born 1970 or 1971) is an Irish animator and visual effects supervisor, who has worked on several film series, including The Lord of the Rings film trilogy, the Chronicles of Narnia films and the Avatar franchise. Amongst other awards, Baneham has received a BAFTA Award for Best Special Visual Effects and an Academy Award for Best Visual Effects in 2009, for his work on Avatar, with a further two Academy Awards awarded to him in 2023 and 2026, for visual effects on Avatar: The Way of Water and Avatar: Fire and Ash.

== Early and personal life ==
Baneham is from Tallaght in Dublin and went to secondary school in Old Bawn before training in Ballyfermot Art College. In the 1990s, he moved to Los Angeles to pursue his career with his then girlfriend (and now wife) Ashling.

== Career ==
Upon moving to Los Angeles in the 1990s, Baneham worked as an animator on several films including The Iron Giant and as animation supervisor on Cats & Dogs. He also worked with Rhythm and Hues on The Chronicles of Narnia: The Lion, the Witch and the Wardrobe, and as animation supervisor (overseeing the animation of the character of Gollum) on The Lord of the Rings: The Two Towers and The Lord of the Rings: The Return of the King.

His work also featured in the 2009 movie Avatar. For his work on Avatar, Richie, along with Joe Letteri, Stephen Rosenbaum and Andrew R. Jones, won the Academy Award for Best Visual Effects at the 82nd Academy Awards and the visual effects category at the 2010 BAFTAs.

Baneham reportedly signed up to work on the planned Avatar sequels, and in an interview on The Tommy Tiernan Show which aired on 12 January 2017, Baneham confirmed that he was in pre-production on Avatar 2, 3, 4 and 5.

At the 16th Visual Effects Society Awards in February 2018, a team of visual effects artists, including Baneham, was recognised for its work on Avatar: Flight of Passage - an attraction at Disney's Animal Kingdom. In 2019, he was credited for visual effects work on Alita: Battle Angel.

In 2023, together with Joe Letteri, Eric Saindon and Daniel Barrett, he won the Academy Award for Best Visual Effects at the 95th Academy Awards for his work on Avatar: The Way of Water.

In 2026, again with Joe Letteri, Eric Saindon,and Daniel Barrett, he won the Academy Award for Best Visual Effects at the 98th Academy Awards for his work on Avatar: Fire and Ash.

== Selected filmography ==
- The Iron Giant (animator)
- Cats & Dogs (animator)
- The Chronicles of Narnia: The Lion, the Witch and the Wardrobe (main animator)
- The Lord of the Rings: The Two Towers (main animator)
- The Lord of the Rings: The Return of the King (main animator)
- Avatar (animation producer)
- Alita: Battle Angel (visual effects supervisor)
- Avatar: The Way of Water (visual effects supervisor, executive producer)
