= Daniel Jeannette =

Daniel Jeannette (born August 8, 1961) is an Animation Director and Visual Effects Supervisor, known for his work on the Academy Award-winning 2006 animated film Happy Feet. In 2009, he supervised the Visual Effects and Animation for the Spike Jonze film Where the Wild Things Are.
