= Kevin Pike =

American special effects supervisor

- Born: May 9, 1951 (age 74); Hartford, Connecticut
- Occupation: Special effects supervisor/talent agent/screenwriting consultant

J. Kevin Pike (born 9 May 1951) is an American film special effects supervisor, former below-the-line talent agent, and screenwriting consultant. Pike is best known for supervising the Special Effects of the 1985 film Back to the Future. He and his company Filmtrix, Inc. were responsible for the construction of the film's iconic DeLorean Time Machine.

== Life and career ==
Pike was born in Hartford Connecticut to John Thomas Pike and Barbara Ann Clapp. He showed interest in the arts at an early age by making his own 8mm films. While attending Granby Memorial High School he served as President of the Drama Club for all four years during which he won Best Actor in 1967 for his role in The Apollo of Bellac. Pike graduated high school in 1969 and later studied Business Management at the University of Hartford.

Pike’s film career began in April 1974, while working as a busboy at the Harborside Restaurant in Martha's Vineyard, after a chance encounter with the first film crew of Jaws (1974) to arrive on the island. Pike was hired onto the film as a local doing set construction, painting of the shark, and ended up working with the Special Effects crew. After Jaws, Pike came out to Hollywood and continued his work in Special Effects with the major studios for film, television, and commercials. His work has served on numerous projects for Steven Spielberg and directors such as Robert Zemeckis, John Schlesinger, Taylor Hackford, David Fincher, Tim Burton, Wes Craven, and George Lucas.

He has also been a Director with the DGA since 1985, after garnering a series of commercials for Mattel and Second Unit directing. He is also a member of SAG/AFTRA and BAFTA. Pike has lectured at USC, UCLA, and Columbia College Hollywood as well as teaching Special Effects classes at the Academy of Art University. Additionally, Pike has served as a Governor for the Academy of Television Arts and Sciences and on the Executive Committee for the Visual Effects Branch for the Academy of Motion Picture Arts and Sciences.

Kevin Pike lives north of Los Angeles, California, where he manages his company, Filmtrix, Inc. He is a writer’s consultant and a story developer for studios and production entities, helping writers complete their scripts and advising them on how to pitch their written work to producers and developers. He has three children; Jennifer Pike, Camille Pike, and Jackson Pike.

== Awards ==
Pike has earned nominations and awards including a Primetime Emmy Award for Outstanding Individual Achievement in Special Visual Effects for the Amblin Television Production Earth 2 in 1995, a Clio Award for Best Special Effects on a Levi’s commercial directed by Michael Bay in 2000.

He also received a BAFTA nomination, and was considered for Oscar nomination on Back to the Future.

== Films ==
The following is a list of the most notable films with special effects by Kevin Pike.

1970s

- Jaws (1975)
- Close Encounters of the Third Kind (1977)
- Jaws 2 (1978)
- The Frisco Kid (1979)
- Star Trek: The Motion Picture (1979)
- 1941 (1979)

1980s

- Indiana Jones and the Temple of Doom (1984)
- The Last Starfighter (1984)
- Back to the Future (1985)
- Moonwalker (1988)

1990s

- Ed Wood (1994)
- Fight Club (1999)

2000s

- Jurassic Park III (2001)
- 44 Minutes (2003)
- Feast (2005)
- Ask the Dust (2006)

== Sources ==
- Kevin Pike Biography (1951-)
