= Craig Hayes =

Visual effects artist

- Occupation: Visual effects artist
- Years active: 1987-present

Craig Hayes (also known as Craig Davies) is a visual effects artist. He was nominated at the 73rd Academy Awards for his work on the film Hollow Man. He shared his nomination with Scott E. Anderson, Stan Parks and Scott Stokdyk.

During the 69th Academy Awards he won a Technical Achievement Award.

He also works for Tippett Studio.

== Selected filmography ==
- RoboCop (1987)
- Willow (1988)
- Honey, I Shrunk the Kids (1989)
- RoboCop 2 (1990)
- Jurassic Park (1993)
- RoboCop 3 (1993)
- Tremors II: Aftershocks (1996)
- DragonHeart (1996)
- Starship Troopers (1997)
- The Haunting (1999)
- My Favorite Martian (1999)
- Virus (1999)
- Hollow Man (2000)
- Evolution (2001)
- The One (2001)
- Blade II (2002)
- The Matrix Revolutions (2003)
- Constantine (2005)
- Sea Monsters: A Prehistoric Adventure (2007)
- Red Cliff (2008)
- Red Cliff II (2009)
- Immortals (2011)
- Mirror Mirror (2012)
