= Stan Parks =

- Occupation: Visual effects artist
- Years active: 1980–present

Stan Parks is a visual effects artist. He was nominated at the 73rd Academy Awards for his work on the film Hollow Man. He shared his nomination with Scott E. Anderson, Craig Hayes and Scott Stokdyk. This was in the category of Best Visual Effects.

== Selected filmography ==
- The Right Stuff (1983)
- Scarface (1983)
- Jagged Edge (1985)
- Gung Ho (1986)
- Project Retaliation (1986)
- Tough Guys (1986)
- Planes, Trains & Automobiles (1987)
- Mississippi Burning (1988)
- Black Rain (1989)
- Home Alone 2: Lost in New York (1992)
- I.Q. (1994)
- Wolf (1994)
- Jumanji (1995)
- Flubber (1997)
- Hollow Man (2000)
- Rat Race (2001)
- XxX (2002)
- Big Fish (2003)
- Flight of the Phoenix (2004)
- Deja Vu (2006)
- G-Force (2009)
- Public Enemies (2009)
- Battle: Los Angeles (2011)
- Battleship (2012)
- 2 Guns (2013)
- Man of Steel (2013)
- Fury (2014)
- Need for Speed (2014)
- Taken 3 (2015)
