= Tim Burke (visual effects supervisor) =

English visual effects supervisor

Tim Burke is an English visual effects supervisor. He has worked on several prominent film franchises and TV shows including Harry Potter, Fantastic Beasts, and The Little Mermaid.

== Early life and career ==
He was born in 1965 in Newcastle-on-Tyne, Tyneside, England. Years after that he studied graphic design and did commercials, but then in 1996 started doing film effects with Ridley Scott's new company. Burke has worked with Scott on three projects: Gladiator, Hannibal, and Black Hawk Down. Burke also collaborated with Scott's late brother, Tony Scott, on Enemy of the State.

In August 2023, Tim Burke joined DNEG as part of the senior creative team. On joining DNEG, Burke said: “I’ve worked with DNEG as an independent VFX Supervisor for 20 years, watching the facility grow from strength to strength during that time, so I am very excited to be forging even closer ties with the company and the amazingly talented artists who work here, during this next chapter of my career."

== Recognition ==
On 24 January 2012 he was nominated for an Academy Award for the film Harry Potter and the Deathly Hallows – Part 2. He had previously been on the team that won the Academy Award for Best Visual Effects for Gladiator.

For his work on the Potter franchise, Burke was nominated for three Academy Awards and five BAFTAs. Burke won his first BAFTA for Harry Potter and the Deathly Hallows – Part 2.
