= Gary Brozenich =

Visual effects supervisor

- Occupation: visual effects supervisor
- Years active: 2003-present

Gary Brozenich is a visual effects supervisor. Brozenich and his fellow visual effects artists were nominated for an Academy Award for Best Visual Effects for the 2013 film The Lone Ranger. After 22 years at MPC, Gary joined Framestore as a visual effects supervisor in October 2023.

== Selected filmography ==
- Transformers: Rise of the Beasts - production VFX supervisor
- The Last Duel - production VFX supervisor
- Maleficent: Mistress of Evil - production VFX supervisor
- All the Money in the World - production VFX supervisor
- Pirates of the Caribbean: Salazar's Revenge - production VFX supervisor
- The Lone Ranger - production VFX supervisor
- Edge of Tomorrow - VFX supervisor
- Wrath of the Titans - VFX supervisor
- Pirates of the Caribbean: On Stranger Tides - VFX supervisor
- Clash of the Titans - VFX supervisor

== Awards & Recognition ==
- 2014 Academy Award Nominee, Best Achievement for Visual Effects - The Lone Ranger
