= Brian Van't Hul =

Visual effects artist

- Occupation: Visual effects artist
- Years active: 1993-present

Brian Van't Hul is a visual effects artist. He won the Academy Award during the 78th Academy Awards for the 2005 film King Kong in the category of Best Visual Effects. He shared his win with Joe Letteri, Christian Rivers and Richard Taylor.

Van't Hul now works at Laika Studios where he helped make films like Coraline (2009) and Paranorman (2012).

His more recent visual effects credits include The Batman (2022), Black Panther: Wakanda Forever (2022), Deadpool & Wolverine (2024), and Avatar: Fire and Ash (2025).

== Selected filmography ==
- King Kong (2005)
- I, Robot (2004)
- The Lord of the Rings: The Return of the King (2003)
- Master and Commander: The Far Side of the World (2003)
- The Lord of the Rings: The Two Towers (2002)
- The Lord of the Rings: The Fellowship of the Ring (2001)
- Forrest Gump (1994)
