= Matthew E. Butler =

American visual effects supervisor

- Education: MIT aeronautics and astronautics
- Occupation: Visual effects artist
- Years active: 1992-present

Matthew E. Butler is a visual effects supervisor.

He was nominated at the 84th Academy Awards in the category of Academy Award for Best Visual Effects for the film Transformers: Dark of the Moon. His nomination was shared with Scott Benza, Scott Farrar and John Frazier. In 2014, Matthew's collaboration with Steven Spielberg on Ready Player One earned him nominations for Academy, BAFTA, and VES awards.

== Selected filmography ==
- Ender's Game
- Morbius
- Ready Player One
