= Tim Alexander (visual effects) =

American visual effects supervisor

- Occupation: Visual effects supervisor
- Years active: 1995-present

Tim Alexander is a visual effects supervisor.

Alexander and his fellow visual effects artists were nominated for an Academy Award for Best Visual Effects for the 2013 film The Lone Ranger.
