= Charles Gibson (special effects artist) =

American visual effects supervisor

- Other name: Charlie Gibson
- Occupation: Visual effects artist
- Years active: 1985–present
- Father: Henry Gibson

Charles Gibson is an American visual effects supervisor.

== Personal life ==
Gibson is the son of character actor Henry Gibson.

== Filmography ==
- Flight of the Intruder (1991)
- Babe (1995)
- The Green Mile (1999)
- Cats & Dogs (2001)
- The Ring (2002)
- Pirates of the Caribbean: The Curse of the Black Pearl (2003)
- The Terminal (2004)
- Pirates of the Caribbean: Dead Man's Chest (2006)
- Pirates of the Caribbean: At World's End (2007)
- Terminator Salvation (2009)
- Pirates of the Caribbean: On Stranger Tides (2011)
- The Hunger Games: Mockingjay - Part 1 (2014)
- The Hunger Games: Mockingjay - Part 2 (2015)
- Aquaman (2018)

== Oscar awards ==
All of these are in the category of Best Visual Effects.

- 68th Academy Awards – Babe. Award shared with Scott E. Anderson, John Cox and Neal Scanlan. Won.
- 76th Academy Awards – Nominated for Pirates of the Caribbean: The Curse of the Black Pearl. Nomination shared with Terry Frazee, Hal Hickel and John Knoll. Lost to The Lord of the Rings: The Return of the King.
- 79th Academy Awards – Pirates of the Caribbean: Dead Man's Chest, shared with Allen Hall, Hal Hickel and John Knoll. Won.
- 80th Academy Awards – Nominated for Pirates of the Caribbean: At World's End. Nomination shared with John Frazier, Hal Hickel and John Knoll. Lost to The Golden Compass.
