= John Richardson (special effects designer) =

British special effects supervisor

- Born: June 10, 1946 (age 79); Brentford, Middlesex, England
- Occupation: Special effects supervisor
- Awards: Academy Award for Best Visual Effects (1987); BAFTA Award for Best Special Visual Effects (2011)

John Richardson (born June 10, 1946 in England) is a British special effects supervisor. He is best known for his work on the James Bond film series (Casino Royale, Moonraker, Octopussy, A View to a Kill, The Living Daylights, Licence to Kill, Tomorrow Never Dies, The World Is Not Enough and Die Another Day), all the Harry Potter film series (2001-2011), A Bridge Too Far (1977) and Aliens (1986). For the latter, he won the Academy Award for Best Visual Effects at the 1987 ceremony. He won the BAFTA Award for Best Special Visual Effects for his work on the film Harry Potter and the Deathly Hallows – Part 2 (2011), for which he was also nominated for an Academy Award at the 2012 ceremony.

Richardson is the son of special effects pioneer Cliff Richardson, who worked on films including The Dirty Dozen (1967) and Casino Royale (1967), the latter alongside his son. On 13 August 1976, while working on A Bridge Too Far (1977), Richardson was involved in a car accident in the Netherlands that resulted in the death of his girlfriend, Liz Moore, a sculptor and special effects creator who worked on the original suit for C-3PO.

In 2019, he published the book Making Movie Magic, which detailed his career in film. In addition to his work in special effects, he also specialized in pyrotechnics and as a second unit director.

== Filmography ==
- 1967: Casino Royale (special effects - uncredited)
- 1968: Duffy (special effects)
- 1969: Battle of Britain (special effects assistant - uncredited)
- 1970: Leo the Last (special effects supervisor)
- 1970: The Railway Children (special effects)
- 1971: The Devils (special effects)
- 1971: Straw Dogs (special effects)
- 1972: Young Winston (special effects)
- 1973: The Day of the Jackal (special effects: England)
- 1974: Mahler (special effects)
- 1974: Callan (special effects)
- 1974: Phase IV (special effects)
- 1974: Juggernaut (special effects)
- 1974: The Little Prince (special effects)
- 1975: Rosebud (special effects)
- 1975: Rollerball (special effects)
- 1975: Hennessy (special effects)
- 1975: Royal Flash (special effects)
- 1975: Lucky Lady (special effects)
- 1976: The Omen (special effects)
- 1977: A Bridge Too Far (special effects supervisor)
- 1977: The People That Time Forgot (special effects supervisor: Spain)
- 1978: Warlords of Atlantis (special effects supervisor)
- 1978: Superman (special effects: Canada and New York)
- 1979: North Sea Hijack (supervisor of special effects and special sequences)
- 1979: Escape to Athena (special effects)
- 1979: Moonraker (special effects)
- 1980: The Watcher in the Woods (special effects)
- 1980: Raise the Titanic (special effects - uncredited)
- 1982: Five Days One Summer (special effects supervisor)
- 1983: Octopussy (special effects supervisor)
- 1983: Slayground (special effects)
- 1985: Ladyhawke (special effects supervisor)
- 1985: A View to a Kill (special effects supervisor)
- 1986: Aliens (special effects supervisor)
- 1987: The Living Daylights (special visual effects)
- 1988: Willow (special effects supervisor)
- 1989: Licence to Kill (special visual effects)
- 1990: Treasure Island (special effects supervisor)
- 1991: Highlander II: The Quickening (special effects designer)
- 1992: Far and Away (special effects supervisor: Ireland)
- 1992: Christopher Columbus: The Discovery (special effects supervisor)
- 1993: Cliffhanger (special effects coordinator)
- 1993: Ghost in the Machine (special effects consultant)
- 1994: Love Affair (special effects supervisor)
- 1995: Bushwhacked (special effects supervisor)
- 1996: Broken Arrow (special effects consultant)
- 1997: Starship Troopers (special effects supervisor)
- 1997: Tomorrow Never Dies (miniatures)
- 1999: Deep Blue Sea (special effects supervisor)
- 1999: The World Is Not Enough (miniatures)
- 2000: The Family Man (special effects coordinator - uncredited)
- 2001: Harry Potter and the Philosopher's Stone (special effects supervisor)
- 2002: Men in Black II (creature coordinator)
- 2002: Enough (special effects coordinator)
- 2002: Die Another Day (model effects supervisor)
- 2002: Harry Potter and the Chamber of Secrets (special effects supervisor)
- 2004: Harry Potter and the Prisoner of Azkaban (special effects supervisor)
- 2005: Harry Potter and the Goblet of Fire (special effects supervisor)
- 2007: Harry Potter and the Order of the Phoenix (special effects supervisor)
- 2009: Harry Potter and the Half-Blood Prince (special effects supervisor)
- 2010: Harry Potter and the Deathly Hallows – Part 1 (special effects supervisor)
- 2011: Harry Potter and the Deathly Hallows – Part 2 (special effects supervisor)
