= Eric Reynolds (visual effects) =

- Occupation: visual effects supervisor
- Years active: 1996-present

Eric Reynolds is a visual effects supervisor. Reynolds and his fellow visual effects artists are nominated for an Academy Award for Best Visual Effects for the 2013 film The Hobbit: The Desolation of Smaug.
