= Jeff White (visual effects) =

- Occupation: Visual effects artist
- Years active: 1993–present

Jeff White is a visual effects artist who was nominated for Best Visual Effects at the 85th Academy Awards and 90th Academy Awards for The Avengers and Kong: Skull Island, respectively.

== Selected filmography ==
- Kong: Skull Island (2017)
- Warcraft (2016)
- Transformers: Age of Extinction (2014)
- Marvel's The Avengers (2012)
- Transformers: Dark of the Moon (2011)
- Transformers: Revenge of the Fallen (2009)
- Indiana Jones and the Kingdom of the Crystal Skull (2008)
- Transformers (2007)
- Pirates of the Caribbean: Dead Man's Chest (2006)
- The Chronicles of Narnia: The Lion, the Witch and the Wardrobe (2005)
- Star Wars: Episode III – Revenge of the Sith (2005)
