= R. Christopher White =

Visual effects artist

- Occupation: Visual effects artist
- Years active: 1996–present

R. Christopher White is a three time Oscar-nominated visual effects artist.

== Oscar history ==
Both nominations are in the category of Academy Award for Best Visual Effects.

- 84th Academy Awards-Nominated for Rise of the Planet of the Apes, nomination shared with Daniel Barrett, Dan Lemmon and Joe Letteri. Lost to Hugo.
- 85th Academy Awards-Nominated for The Hobbit: An Unexpected Journey, nomination shared with David Clayton, Joe Letteri and Eric Saindon. Lost to Life of Pi.
