= Scott Farrar =

American visual effects supervisor

- Occupation: Visual effects supervisor

Scott Farrar is an American visual effects supervisor. He is also known for being the lead visual effects supervisor of the Transformers film series and the film A Quiet Place 2. He has been nominated for an Academy Award six times, winning once for Cocoon. His other nominations include Backdraft, A.I. Artificial Intelligence, The Chronicles of Narnia: The Lion, the Witch and the Wardrobe, Transformers and Transformers: Dark of the Moon.
