= Hal Hickel =

American animator

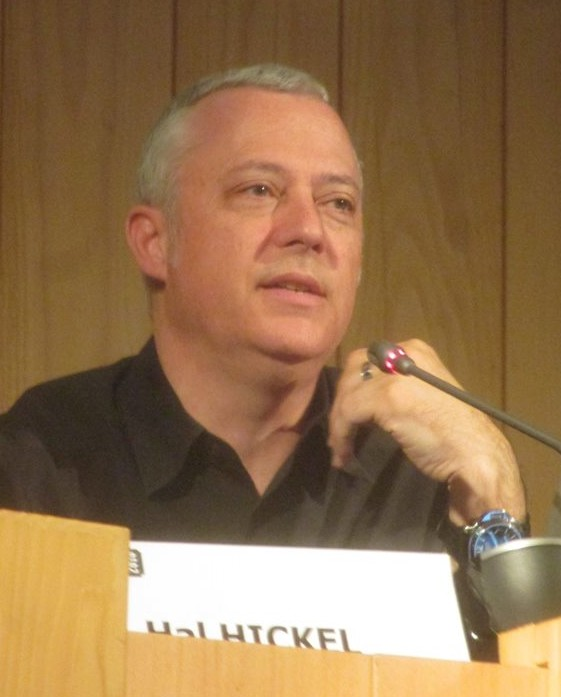
Hickel at the 2016 Annecy International Animated Film Festival

Hal T. Hickel is a visual effects animator for Industrial Light & Magic.

At the age of 12, Hickel wrote a letter to Lucasfilm, outlining his ideas for a sequel to the original Star Wars movie (now known as Star Wars Episode IV: A New Hope), and received a polite rejection letter from producer Gary Kurtz. The letter now hangs on the wall of Hickel's office at ILM. Twenty years later, Hickel found himself working on Star Wars after all, as a lead animator on Star Wars: Episode I – The Phantom Menace.

A native of Bailey, Colorado, Hickel joined the Film Graphics Program at CalArts in 1982. He worked at An-FX from 1982 until 1988, and then joined Will Vinton Studios, working in stop-motion and motion control.

Hickel began his animation career at Pixar in 1994, where he worked on Toy Story and the THX promos, as well as some of Pixar's short films. Hearing that a new Star Wars trilogy was in pre-production, Hickel applied for a transfer to ILM on the chance that he might get to work on the prequels. He was first assigned as an animator on The Lost World: Jurassic Park, but was eventually assigned to work on The Phantom Menace, and later its sequel, Star Wars: Episode II – Attack of the Clones, where he was responsible for the unique movement of the Droideka destroyer droids.

His other credits include: A.I. Artificial Intelligence, Space Cowboys, Dreamcatcher and Van Helsing. In 2007, Hickel won the BAFTA and the Academy Award for Best Visual Effects along with John Knoll, Charles Gibson and Allen Hall, for Pirates of the Caribbean: Dead Man's Chest. He also received an Academy Award nomination for his work on Rogue One: A Star Wars Story.
