= Visual effects supervisor =

Filmmaker responsible for visual effects

In the context of film and television production, a visual effects supervisor is responsible for achieving the creative aims of the director or producers through the use of visual effects.

Although the role involves creative responsibilities, visual effects supervisors typically possess a strong technical background and oversee decisions regarding the methods and technologies used to achieve desired effects. They often work closely with visual effects producers and computer graphics supervisors throughout the production process.

Supervisors can be employed directly by a film production company or work for a visual effects company. Often there are several VFX supervisors on a project, although there is typically a senior VFX supervisor directing their efforts.

Specific responsibilities vary depending on the nature of the production, however most supervisors:

- Handle a VFX project from conception through to completion.
- Manage and direct the technical, artistic, and production personnel.
- Possess a knowledge of various visual effects techniques with emphasis on camera set-ups and film knowledge with an eye for composition and camera work.
- Accurately predict timing and associated costs of project.
- Collaborate on the bidding and negotiation processes.

The Visual Effects Society is a prominent trade organization representing the interests of visual effects professionals.

== See also ==
- Graphics coordinator
- VFX creative director
