= List of accolades received by the 2002–2007 Spider-Man film series =

Spider-Man film series awards and nominations
Awards and nominations
Award	Wins	Nominations
Academy Awards	1	5
American Film Institute	1	1
Annie Awards	0	1
BMI Film and TV Awards	2	2
British Academy Film Awards	0	5
Broadcast Film Critics Association Awards	1	3
Cinema Audio Society Awards	0	1
Empire Awards	2	3
Golden Trailer Awards	1	5
Grammy Award	0	2
Hugo Awards	0	2
Kids' Choice Awards	0	5
London Critics Circle Film Awards	0	1
MTV Movie Awards	2	10
National Movie Awards	0	3
People's Choice Awards	0	7
Satellite Awards	0	10
Saturn Awards	5	13
Teen Choice Awards	4	15
Visual Effects Society Award	3	10
World Soundtrack Awards	0	1
World Stunt Awards	0	4
Young Artist Awards	0	1

Totals (Note: Certain award groups do not simply award one winner. They acknowledge several different recipients, have runners-up, and have third place. Since this is a specific recognition and is different from losing an award, runner-up mentions are considered wins in this award tally. For simplification and to avoid errors, each award in this list has been presumed to have had a prior nomination.)
- Wins: 24
- Nominations: 110

The 2002–2007 Spider-Man film series, also called the Sam Raimi trilogy or the Tobey Maguire trilogy, is a superhero film series consisting of three Spider-Man films with the same director and main actor: Spider-Man (2002), Spider-Man 2 (2004) and Spider-Man 3 (2007). Based on the Marvel comic book series about the fictional character of the same name, all three films were directed by Sam Raimi and distributed by Columbia Pictures. Tobey Maguire plays Spider-Man, with Kirsten Dunst portraying his love interest, Mary Jane Watson, and James Franco concluding the principal cast with his role as Harry Osborn, Spider-Man's frenemy. Throughout the series, the Spider-Man releases featured villains such as Green Goblin (Willem Dafoe), Doctor Octopus (Alfred Molina), Sandman (Thomas Haden Church) and Venom (Topher Grace). Other characters who appeared in the series are Betty Brant (Elizabeth Banks), J. Jonah Jameson (J. K. Simmons) and Gwen Stacy (Bryce Dallas Howard).

Every Spider-Man film was a financial success and achieved blockbuster status. Each installment was the third top-grossing film of their respective release years. In 2002, The Lord of the Rings: The Two Towers and Harry Potter and the Chamber of Secrets performed better than Spider-Man. For 2004, Shrek 2 and Harry Potter and the Prisoner of Azkaban had grossed more than Spider-Man 2 and Pirates of the Caribbean: At World's End and Harry Potter and the Order of the Phoenix outdid Spider-Man 3's revenue. With a box office total of nearly $900 million, Spider-Man 3 stands as the highest-earning in the series and is the 31st highest-grossing film worldwide. The previous two entries sit at 41st and 48th in worldwide totals. The franchise made around $2.5 billion at the box office in ticket sales.

Overall, the film series received positive to polarized reception from critics. Spider-Man was released to largely positive reviews from the media, scoring an 89% rating based on a sample of 192 reviews on review aggregator Rotten Tomatoes with an average of 7.6/10. The second entry performed even better with critics, garnering an approval rating of 93% on Rotten Tomatoes, with an average rating of 8.2 out of 10. With 241 reviews accounted for, Rotten Tomatoes reported that Spider-Man 3 had an approval rating of 63% and a score of 6.2/10. Metacritic lists the third installment as having a 59% rating on its site. Spider-Man 2 was named the third best superhero film of all time by IGN and Time magazine.

Raimi's Spider-Man series won various awards and gathered five Academy Award nominations: two for Spider-Man and three for Spider-Man 2, with one win for Best Visual Effects in 2005 for Spider-Man 2. The series won two MTV Movie Awards out of ten nominations, five Saturn Awards out of thirteen nominations and four Teen Choice Awards out of fifteen nominations. The films were nominated for one Annie Award, five British Academy Film Awards, two Grammy Awards and ten Satellite Awards. Other honors came from the Visual Effects Society Awards, which gave the franchise ten nominations and three wins, as well as the Taurus World Stunt Awards, which nominated the films for three of their accolades. The American Film Institute named Spider-Man 2 one of the Best Movie Productions of 2004.

== Spider-Man (2002) ==
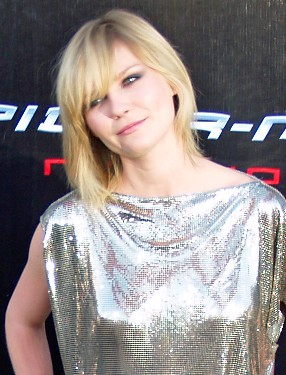
Kirsten Dunst won an Empire Award and two MTV Movie Awards for her performance as Mary Jane Watson.

The first film in the series, Spider-Man, was released in American theaters on May 3, 2002. Its plot follows Peter Parker (played by Tobey Maguire), a high school student in New York City who develops spider-like powers and begins fighting crime under the alias Spider-Man. During the course of the film, he seeks the attention of his love interest, Mary Jane Watson (Kirsten Dunst), and faces the malevolent Green Goblin (Willem Dafoe). By the end of its theatrical run, the film had grossed over $820 million.

The film's visual effects and sound were nominated by several award committees, including the Academy Awards, for being the best in film for that year. Danny Elfman work on the film's music earned him an accolade from BMI Film and TV Awards. The film's song "Hero", performed by Chad Kroeger, scored nominations from the Broadcast Film Critics Association and 45th Grammy Awards. Dunst's performance earned her both an Empire Award and an accolade from the viewer-voted 2003 MTV Movie Awards. She also shared an award from MTV for Best Kiss with Maguire, who was nominated for Best Male Performance at the same ceremony. The Golden Trailer Awards nominated the film's trailers for four awards and Spider-Man's stunt work earned it one nomination from the World Stunt Awards.

Award	Date of ceremony	Category	Recipients	Result
Academy Awards	March 23, 2003	Best Sound	Kevin O'Connell, Greg P. Russell and Ed Novick	Nominated
Academy Awards	March 23, 2003	Best Visual Effects	John Dykstra, Scott Stokdyk, Anthony LaMolinara and John Frazier	Nominated
BMI Film and TV Awards	May 14, 2003	BMI Film Music Award	Danny Elfman	Won
British Academy Film Awards	February 23, 2003	Best Achievement in Special Visual Effects	John Dykstra, Scott Stokdyk, John Frazier, Anthony LaMolinara, John Dykstra, Scott Stokdyk, John Frazier and Anthony LaMolinara	Nominated
Broadcast Film Critics Association	January 17, 2003	Best Song	Chad Kroeger ("Hero")	Nominated
Empire Awards	February 5, 2003	Best Actress	Kirsten Dunst	Won
Golden Trailer Awards	March 14, 2002	Best Action	Spider-Man	Nominated
Golden Trailer Awards	March 14, 2002	Best Music	Spider-Man	Nominated
Golden Trailer Awards	March 14, 2002	Best of Show	Spider-Man	Nominated
Golden Trailer Awards	March 14, 2002	Best Voice Over	Spider-Man	Won
Grammy Award	February 23, 2003	Best Score Soundtrack Album for a Motion Picture, Television or Other Visual Media	Danny Elfman	Nominated
Grammy Award	February 23, 2003	Best Song Written for a Motion Picture, Television or Other Visual Media	Chad Kroeger ("Hero")	Nominated
Hugo Awards	August 30, 2003	Best Dramatic Presentation – Long Form	Spider-Man	Nominated
Kids' Choice Awards	April 12, 2003	Favorite Movie	Spider-Man	Nominated
Kids' Choice Awards	April 12, 2003	Favorite Movie Actress	Kirsten Dunst	Nominated
Kids' Choice Awards	April 12, 2003	Favorite Male Butt Kicker	Tobey Maguire	Nominated
MTV Movie Awards	May 31, 2003	Best Female Performance	Kirsten Dunst	Won
MTV Movie Awards	May 31, 2003	Best Kiss	Tobey Maguire and Kirsten Dunst	Won
MTV Movie Awards	May 31, 2003	Best Male Performance	Tobey Maguire	Nominated
MTV Movie Awards	May 31, 2003	Best Movie	Spider-Man	Nominated
MTV Movie Awards	May 31, 2003	Best Villain	Willem Dafoe	Nominated
People's Choice Awards	January 12, 2003	Favorite Motion Picture	Spider-Man	Nominated
Satellite Awards	January 12, 2003	Best Film Editing	Eric Zumbrunnen	Nominated
Satellite Awards	January 12, 2003	Best Visual Effects	John Dykstra	Nominated
Saturn Awards	May 18, 2003	Best Fantasy Film	Spider-Man	Nominated
Saturn Awards	May 18, 2003	Best Actor	Tobey Maguire	Nominated
Saturn Awards	May 18, 2003	Best Actress	Kirsten Dunst	Nominated
Saturn Awards	May 18, 2003	Best Director	Sam Raimi	Nominated
Saturn Awards	May 18, 2003	Best Music	Danny Elfman	Won
Saturn Awards	May 18, 2003	Best Special Effects	John Dykstra, Scott Stokdyk, Anthony LaMolinara and John Frazier	Nominated
Teen Choice Awards	August 19, 2002	Choice Movie: Drama/Action Adventure	Spider-Man	Won
Teen Choice Awards	August 19, 2002	Choice Movie Actor: Drama/Action Adventure	Tobey Maguire	Won
Teen Choice Awards	August 19, 2002	Choice Movie Actress: Drama/Action Adventure	Kirsten Dunst	Nominated
Teen Choice Awards	August 19, 2002	Choice Movie Sleazebag	Willem Dafoe	Nominated
Teen Choice Awards	August 19, 2002	Choice Movie Liplock	Tobey Maguire and Kirsten Dunst	Won
Teen Choice Awards	August 19, 2002	Choice Movie Hissy Fit	Willem Dafoe	Nominated
World Soundtrack Awards	October 19, 2002	Best Original Soundtrack of the Year – Orchestral	Danny Elfman	Nominated
World Stunt Awards	June 1, 2003	Best Fight	Chris Daniels, Zach Hudson, Kim Kahana Jr., Johnny Nguyen and Mark Aaron Wagner	Nominated
Young Artist Awards	March 29, 2003	Best Family Feature Film - Fantasy	Spider-Man	Nominated

== Spider-Man 2 (2004) ==
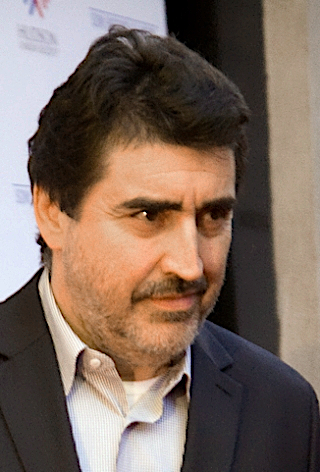
Alfred Molina was nominated for six awards for his portrayal of Doctor Octopus.

Spider-Man 2 opened in American theaters on June 30, 2004. The plot follows Peter as he struggles to manage both his personal life and his crime-fighting as Spider-Man, while encountering Doctor Octopus (Alfred Molina), a scientist who goes insane as the result of a failed experiment. Spider-Man 2 was less successful than Spider-Man in its first week of release, taking first place at the box office with around $88 million at 4,152 theaters. Nonetheless, it set several box office records at the time and broke the record for best opening day ever, previously held by Spider-Man. It eventually earned more than $783 million worldwide but still stands as the lowest-grossing film of the trilogy. However, according to review aggregators Rotten Tomatoes and Metacritic, Spider-Man 2 is the most well-reviewed of the three Raimi films.

Out of the film's three Academy Award nominations, Spider-Man 2 was awarded Best Visual Effects. At the 58th British Academy Film Awards, the sequel's sound and visual effects were nominated. A third nomination was for Orange Film of the Year, a category for the 10 biggest United Kingdom box office hits, voted by the public. The film itself also won the Broadcast Film Critics Association Awards's Best Popular Movie honor and was named one of 2004's best pictures by the American Film Institute committee. Spider-Man 2 swept the 31st Saturn Awards with eight nominations and four wins. Maguire and Raimi respectively picked up the Best Actor and Best Director awards and the film was named 2004's Best Fantasy Film. Its writing, supporting performance by Molina and music were among other aspects the Saturn Awards nominated Spider-Man 2 for. At the 2005 MTV Movie Awards, Molina got another nomination, this time for Best Villain. The award show also nominated the sequel for its Best Movie Honor. Another awards organization to honor Molina's portrayal of Doctor Octopus were the London Film Critics Circle Awards, who nominated him for the year's Best Supporting Actor. The 10th Empire Awards gave Raimi his second accolade for his direction on Spider-Man 2. Its overall featured stunt work won it a World Stunt Award and its visual effects scored Spider-Man 2 six Visual Effects Society Award nominations.

Award	Date of ceremony	Category	Recipients	Result
Academy Awards	February 27, 2005	Best Sound Editing	Paul N.J. Ottosson	Nominated
Academy Awards	February 27, 2005	Best Sound Mixing	Kevin O'Connell, Greg P. Russell, Jeffrey J. Haboush and Joseph Geisinger	Nominated
Academy Awards	February 27, 2005	Best Visual Effects	John Dykstra, Scott Stokdyk, Anthony LaMolinara and John Frazier	Won
American Film Institute Awards	2005	Movie of the Year	Spider-Man 2	Won
BMI Film and TV Awards	May 18, 2005	BMI Film Music Award	Danny Elfman	Won
British Academy Film Awards	February 12, 2005	Best Achievement in Special Visual Effects	John Dykstra, Scott Stokdyk, Anthony LaMolinara and John Frazier	Nominated
British Academy Film Awards	February 12, 2005	BAFTA Award for Best Sound	Paul N.J. Ottosson, Kevin O'Connell, Greg P. Russell and Jeffrey J. Haboush	Nominated
British Academy Film Awards	February 12, 2005	Orange Film of the Year	Spider-Man 2	Nominated
Broadcast Film Critics Association Awards	January 10, 2005	Best Family Film	Spider-Man 2	Nominated
Broadcast Film Critics Association Awards	January 10, 2005	Best Popular Movie	Spider-Man 2	Won
Cinema Audio Society Awards	February 19, 2005	Outstanding Achievement in Sound Mixing for Motion Pictures	Joseph Geisinger, Kevin O'Connell, Greg P. Russell and Jeffrey J. Haboush	Nominated
Empire Awards	March 13, 2005	Best Actor	Tobey Maguire	Nominated
Empire Awards	March 13, 2005	Best Director	Sam Raimi	Won
Golden Trailer Awards	May 25, 2004	Summer 2004 Blockbuster	Spider-Man 2	Nominated
Hugo Awards	August 7, 2005	Best Dramatic Presentation – Long Form	Spider-Man 2	Nominated
Kids' Choice Awards	April 2, 2005	Favorite Movie	Spider-Man 2	Nominated
Kids' Choice Awards	April 2, 2005	Favorite Movie Actor	Tobey Maguire	Nominated
London Film Critics' Circle Awards	February 9, 2005	British Supporting Actor of the Year	Alfred Molina	Nominated
MTV Movie Awards	June 4, 2005	Best Action Sequence	Spider-Man 2	Nominated
MTV Movie Awards	June 4, 2005	Best Movie	Spider-Man 2	Nominated
MTV Movie Awards	June 4, 2005	Best Villain	Alfred Molina	Nominated
People's Choice Awards	January 9, 2005	Favorite Motion Picture	Spider-Man 2	Nominated
People's Choice Awards	January 9, 2005	Favorite On-Screen Chemistry	Tobey Maguire and Kirsten Dunst	Nominated
People's Choice Awards	January 9, 2005	Favorite Sequel	Spider-Man 2	Nominated
People's Choice Awards	January 9, 2005	Favorite Villain Movie Star	Alfred Molina	Nominated
Satellite Awards	December 17, 2005	Best Actor in a Supporting Role, Drama	Alfred Molina	Nominated
Satellite Awards	December 17, 2005	Best Cinematography	Bill Pope and Anette Haellmigk	Nominated
Satellite Awards	December 17, 2005	Best DVD Extra	Spider-Man 2	Nominated
Satellite Awards	December 17, 2005	Best Film Editing	Bob Murawski	Nominated
Satellite Awards	December 17, 2005	Best Original Score	Danny Elfman	Nominated
Satellite Awards	December 17, 2005	Best Overall DVD	Spider-Man 2	Won
Satellite Awards	December 17, 2005	Best Sound (Editing & Mixing)	Kevin O'Connell, Greg P. Russell, Jeffrey J. Haboush, Joseph Geisinger, Paul N.J. Ottosson and Susan Dudeck	Nominated
Satellite Awards	December 17, 2005	Best Visual Effects	John Dykstra, Scott Stokdyk, Anthony LaMolinara and John Frazier	Nominated
Saturn Awards	May 3, 2005	Best Fantasy Film	Spider-Man 2	Won
Saturn Awards	May 3, 2005	Best Actor	Tobey Maguire	Won
Saturn Awards	May 3, 2005	Best Supporting Actor	Alfred Molina	Nominated
Saturn Awards	May 3, 2005	Best Director	Sam Raimi	Won
Saturn Awards	May 3, 2005	Best Writer	Alvin Sargent	Won
Saturn Awards	May 3, 2005	Best Music	Danny Elfman	Nominated
Saturn Awards	May 3, 2005	Best Special Effects	John Dykstra, Scott Stokdyk, Anthony LaMolinara and John Frazier	Won
Saturn Awards	May 3, 2005	Best DVD Special Edition Release	Spider-Man 2	Nominated
Teen Choice Awards	August 8, 2004	Choice Summer Movie	Spider-Man 2	Won
Teen Choice Awards	August 16, 2005	Choice Movie: Villain	Alfred Molina	Nominated
Visual Effects Society Award	February 16, 2005	Best Single Visual Effect of the Year	John Dykstra, Lydia Bottegoni, Dan Abrams and John Monos	Nominated
Visual Effects Society Award	February 16, 2005	Outstanding Compositing in a Motion Picture	Colin Drobnis, Greg Derochie, Blaine Kennison and Ken Lam	Won
Visual Effects Society Award	February 16, 2005	Outstanding Created Environment in a Live Act on Motion Picture	Dan Abrams, David Emery, Andrew Nawrot and John Hart	Won
Visual Effects Society Award	February 16, 2005	Outstanding Performance by an Actor or Actress in a Visual Effects Film	Alfred Molina	Won
Visual Effects Society Award	February 16, 2005	Outstanding Special Effects in Service to Visual Effects in a Motion Picture	John Frazier, James D. Schwalm, James Nagle and David Amborn	Nominated
Visual Effects Society Award	February 16, 2005	Outstanding Visual Effects in a Visual Effects Driven Motion Picture	John Dykstra, Lydia Bottegoni, Anthony LaMolinara and Scott Stokdyk	Nominated
World Stunt Awards	September 25, 2005	Best Overall Stunt by a Stunt Man	Chris Daniels and Michael Hugghins	Won
World Stunt Awards	September 25, 2005	Best Specialty Stunt	Tim Storms, Garrett Warren, Susie Park, Patricia M. Peters, Norb Phillips, Lisa Hoyle, Kevin L. Jackson and Clay Donahue Fontenot	Nominated
World Stunt Awards	September 25, 2005	Best Work with a Vehicle	Tad Griffith, Richard Burden, Scott Rogers, Darrin Prescott and Mark Norby	Nominated

== Spider-Man 3 (2007) ==
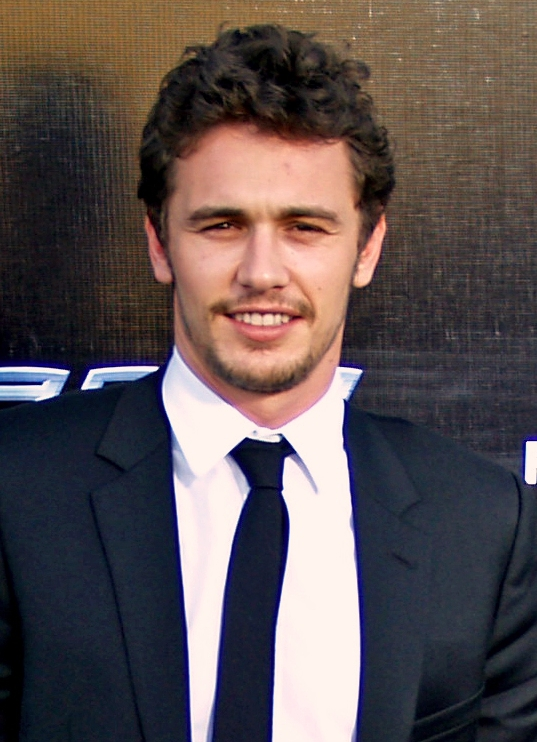
James Franco's performance as Harry Osborn earned him several award nominations.

Spider-Man 3 was released in the United States on May 4, 2007. The film follows Peter as he faces three adversaries—Sandman, Venom, and his vengeful friend Harry Osborn—while his relationship with Mary Jane unravels. Spider-Man 3 surpassed the previous two films' openings, grossing $151 million at over 4,250 locations.

Both the 35th Annie Awards and 61st British Academy Film Awards gave this film one nomination, the former for Best Animated Effects and the latter for Best Special Visual Effects. Spider-Man 3 did not win any of the four Visual Effects Society Awards nominations it received. Dunst's and Maguire's performances earned them each one nomination from the National Movie Awards. She also received another nomination for Favorite Movie Actress from the 2008 Kids' Choice Awards ceremony. The film fared better at the Teen Choice Awards, amounting a total of seven nominations, varying from Choice Movie Villain (for Grace) to Choice Movie Dance (for Maguire) and Choice Movie Liplock (shared between Dunst and Maguire). The movie was also nominated in eleven categories at the Scream Awards, ultimately winning in the category Best Superhero (Tobey Maguire as Spider-Man).

Award	Date of ceremony	Category	Recipients	Result
Annie Awards	February 8, 2008	Best Animated Effects	Ryan Laney	Nominated
British Academy Film Awards	February 10, 2008	Best Special Visual Effects	Scott Stokdyk, Peter Nofz, Kee-Suk Ken Hahn and Spencer Cook	Nominated
Kids' Choice Awards	March 29, 2008	Favorite Movie Actress	Kirsten Dunst	Nominated
Golden Trailer Awards	May 31, 2007	Best Summer Blockbuster	Spider-Man 3	Won
MTV Movie Award	June 1, 2008	Best Fight	James Franco and Tobey Maguire	Nominated
MTV Movie Award	June 1, 2008	Best Villain	Topher Grace	Nominated
National Movie Awards	September 27, 2007	Best Family Film	Spider-Man 3	Nominated
National Movie Awards	September 27, 2007	Best Performance by a Female	Kirsten Dunst	Nominated
National Movie Awards	September 27, 2007	Best Performance by a Male	Tobey Maguire	Nominated
People's Choice Awards	January 8, 2008	Favorite On Screen Match-up	Kirsten Dunst and Tobey Maguire	Nominated
People's Choice Awards	January 8, 2008	Favorite Threequel	Spider-Man	Nominated
Saturn Awards	June 24, 2008	Best Director	Sam Raimi	Nominated
Saturn Awards	June 24, 2008	Best Fantasy Film	Spider-Man 3	Nominated
Saturn Awards	June 24, 2008	Best Special Effects	Scott Stokdyk, Peter Nofz, Spencer Cook and John Frazier	Nominated
Saturn Awards	June 24, 2008	Best Supporting Actor	James Franco	Nominated
Scream Awards	October 21, 2007	Ultimate Scream	Spider-Man 3	Nominated
Scream Awards	October 21, 2007	Best Fantasy Movie	Spider-Man 3	Nominated
Scream Awards	October 21, 2007	Best Superhero	Tobey Maguire as Spider-Man	Won
Scream Awards	October 21, 2007	Fantasy Fox	Kirsten Dunst	Nominated
Scream Awards	October 21, 2007	Most Vile Villain	Thomas Haden Church as Sandman	Nominated
Scream Awards	October 21, 2007	Most Vile Villain	Topher Grace as Eddie Brock/Venom	Nominated
Scream Awards	October 21, 2007	Best Comic-to-Screen Adaptation	Spider-Man 3	Nominated
Scream Awards	October 21, 2007	Best Sequel	Spider-Man 3	Nominated
Scream Awards	October 21, 2007	"Jump-From-Your-Seat" Scene of the Year	Mid-Air battle: Spider-Man vs. The New Goblin	Nominated
Scream Awards	October 21, 2007	Best Director	Sam Raimi	Nominated
Scream Awards	October 21, 2007	Best F/X	Spider-Man 3	Nominated
Teen Choice Awards	August 26, 2007	Choice Movie Actor: Action Adventure	Tobey Maguire	Nominated
Teen Choice Awards	August 26, 2007	Choice Movie Actress: Action Adventure	Kirsten Dunst	Nominated
Teen Choice Awards	August 26, 2007	Choice Movie: Action Adventure	Spider-Man 3	Nominated
Teen Choice Awards	August 26, 2007	Choice Movie Dance	Tobey Maguire	Nominated
Teen Choice Awards	August 26, 2007	Choice Movie Liplock	Tobey Maguire and Kirsten Dunst	Nominated
Teen Choice Awards	August 26, 2007	Choice Movie Rumble	Tobey Maguire and James Franco vs. Topher Grace and Thomas Haden Church	Nominated
Teen Choice Awards	August 26, 2007	Choice Movie Villain	Topher Grace	Nominated
Visual Effects Society Award	February 10, 2008	Best Single Visual Effect of the Year	Scott Stokdyk, Terry Clotiaux, Spencer Cook and Douglas Bloom	Nominated
Visual Effects Society Award	February 10, 2008	Outstanding Animated Character in a Live Action Motion Picture	Chris Y. Yang, Bernd Angerer, Dominick Cecere and Remington Scott	Nominated
Visual Effects Society Award	February 10, 2008	Outstanding Models or Miniatures in a Motion Picture	Ian Hunter, Scott Beverly, Forest P. Fischer and Ray Moore	Nominated
Visual Effects Society Award	February 10, 2008	Outstanding Visual Effects in an Effects Driven Motion Picture	Scott Stokdyk, Terry Clotiaux, Peter Nofz and Spencer Cook	Nominated
