= 31st Saturn Awards =

US film and television award ceremony

- Date: May 3, 2005
- Site: Los Angeles, California, U.S.

Highlights
- Most awards: Spider-Man 2 (5)
- Most nominations: Harry Potter and the Prisoner of Azkaban (9)

The 31st Saturn Awards, honoring the best in science fiction, fantasy and horror film and television in 2004, were held on May 3, 2005, at the Universal City Hilton Hotel in Los Angeles, California, United States.

Below is a complete list of nominees and winners. Winners are highlighted in bold.

== Winners and nominees ==
=== Film ===
Best Sci-Fi Film	Best Fantasy Film
**Eternal Sunshine of the Spotless Mind**; The Butterfly Effect; The Day After Tomorrow; The Forgotten; I, Robot; Sky Captain and the World of Tomorrow	**Spider-Man 2**; Birth; Harry Potter and the Prisoner of Azkaban; Hellboy; Lemony Snicket's A Series of Unfortunate Events; House of Flying Daggers
Best Horror Film	Best Action/Adventure/Thriller Film
**Shaun of the Dead**; Blade: Trinity; Dawn of the Dead; The Grudge; Open Water; Saw; Van Helsing	**Kill Bill: Volume 2**; The Aviator; The Bourne Supremacy; Collateral; The Manchurian Candidate; National Treasure; The Phantom of the Opera
Best Animated Film	Best Actor
**The Incredibles**; The Polar Express; Shark Tale; Shrek 2	**Tobey Maguire – Spider-Man 2 as Peter Parker/Spider-Man**; Christian Bale – The Machinist as Trevor Reznik; Jim Carrey – Eternal Sunshine of the Spotless Mind as Joel Barish; Tom Cruise – Collateral as Vincent; Matt Damon – The Bourne Supremacy as Jason Bourne; Johnny Depp – Finding Neverland as J.M. Barrie
Best Actress	Best Supporting Actor
**Blanchard Ryan – Open Water as Susan Watkins**; Nicole Kidman – Birth as Anna; Julianne Moore – The Forgotten as Telly Paretta; Uma Thurman – Kill Bill: Volume 2 as The Bride/Beatrix Kiddo; Kate Winslet – Eternal Sunshine of the Spotless Mind as Clementine Kruczinsky; Zhang Ziyi – House of Flying Daggers as Mei	**David Carradine – Kill Bill: Volume 2 as Bill**; Alfred Molina – Spider-Man 2 as Otto Octavius/Doctor Octopus; Gary Oldman – Harry Potter and the Prisoner of Azkaban as Sirius Black; Giovanni Ribisi – Sky Captain and the World of Tomorrow as Dex; Liev Schreiber – The Manchurian Candidate as Congressman Raymond Prentiss Shaw; John Turturro – Secret Window as John Shooter
Best Supporting Actress	Best Young Actor/Actress
**Daryl Hannah – Kill Bill: Volume 2 as Elle Driver**; Kim Basinger – Cellular as Jessica Martin; Irma P. Hall – The Ladykillers as Marva Munson; Angelina Jolie – Sky Captain and the World of Tomorrow as Commander Fransesca "Franky" Cook; Diane Kruger – National Treasure as Abigail Chase; Meryl Streep – The Manchurian Candidate as Senator Eleanor Prentiss Shaw	**Emmy Rossum – The Phantom of the Opera as Christine Daaé**; Cameron Bright – Birth as Sean; Perla Haney-Jardine – Kill Bill: Volume 2 as B.B.; Freddie Highmore – Finding Neverland as Peter Llewelyn Davies; Jonathan Jackson – Riding the Bullet as Alan Parker; Daniel Radcliffe – Harry Potter and the Prisoner of Azkaban as Harry Potter
Best Director	Best Screenplay
**Sam Raimi – Spider-Man 2**; Alfonso Cuarón – Harry Potter and the Prisoner of Azkaban; Michel Gondry – Eternal Sunshine of the Spotless Mind; Michael Mann – Collateral; Quentin Tarantino – Kill Bill: Volume 2; Zhang Yimou – House of Flying Daggers	**Alvin Sargent – Spider-Man 2**; Stuart Beattie – Collateral; Brad Bird – The Incredibles; Charlie Kaufman – Eternal Sunshine of the Spotless Mind; Steve Kloves – Harry Potter and the Prisoner of Azkaban; Quentin Tarantino – Kill Bill: Volume 2
Best Score	Best Costume Design
**Alan Silvestri**; **Van Helsing**; The Polar Express; Danny Elfman – Spider-Man 2; Michael Giacchino – The Incredibles; Edward Shearmur – Sky Captain and the World of Tomorrow; John Williams – Harry Potter and the Prisoner of Azkaban	**Kevin Conran – Sky Captain and the World of Tomorrow**; Alexandra Byrne – The Phantom of the Opera; Wendy Partridge – Hellboy; Gabriella Pescucci, Carlo Poggioli – Van Helsing; Jany Temime – Harry Potter and the Prisoner of Azkaban; Emi Wada – House of Flying Daggers
Best Make-Up	Best Visual Effects
**Jake Garber, Matt Rose, Mike Elizalde – Hellboy**; David LeRoy Anderson, Mario Cacioppo – Dawn of the Dead; Greg Cannom, Steve LaPorte – Van Helsing; Nick Dudman, Amanda Knight – Harry Potter and the Prisoner of Azkaban; Paul Jones – Resident Evil: Apocalypse; Valli O'Reilly, Bill Corso – Lemony Snicket's A Series of Unfortunate Events	**John Dykstra, Scott Stokdyk, Anthony LaMolinara, John Frazier – Spider-Man 2**; Peter Chiang, Pablo Helman, Thomas J. Smith – The Chronicles of Riddick; Karen E. Goulekas, Neil Corbould, Greg Strause, Remo Balcells – The Day After Tomorrow; Roger Guyett, Tim Burke, Bill George, John Richardson – Harry Potter and the Prisoner of Azkaban; John Nelson, Andrew R. Jones, Erik Nash, Joe Letteri – I, Robot; Scott Squires, Ben Snow, Daniel Jeannette, Syd Dutton – Van Helsing

=== Television ===
==== Programs ====
Best Network TV Series	Best Syndicated/Cable Television Series
**Lost (ABC)**; Alias (ABC); Angel (The WB); CSI: Crime Scene Investigation (CBS); Smallville (The WB); Star Trek: Enterprise (UPN)	**Stargate SG-1 (Sci-Fi)**; Dead Like Me (Showtime); The Dead Zone (USA Network); The 4400 (USA Network); Nip/Tuck (FX); Stargate Atlantis (Sci-Fi)
Best Television Presentation
**Farscape: The Peacekeeper Wars (Sci-Fi)**; The Dead Will Tell (CBS); 5ive Days to Midnight (Sci-Fi); Legend of Earthsea (Sci-Fi); The Librarian: Quest for the Spear (TNT); Salem's Lot (TNT)

==== Acting ====
Best Television Actor	Best Television Actress
**Ben Browder – Farscape: The Peacekeeper Wars (Sci-Fi) as John Crichton**; Richard Dean Anderson – Stargate SG-1 (Sci-Fi) as Jack O'Neill; Matthew Fox – Lost (ABC) as Jack Shephard; Julian McMahon – Nip/Tuck (FX) as Christian Troy; Tom Welling – Smallville (The WB); Noah Wyle – The Librarian: Quest for the Spear (TNT) as Flynn Carsen	**Claudia Black – Farscape: The Peacekeeper Wars (Sci-Fi) as Aeryn Sun**; Kristen Bell – Veronica Mars (UPN) as Veronica Mars; Jennifer Garner – Alias (ABC) as Sydney Bristow; Anne Heche – The Dead Will Tell (CBS) as Emily Parker; Evangeline Lilly – Lost (ABC) as Kate Austen; Amber Tamblyn – Joan of Arcadia (CBS) as Joan Girardi
Best Supporting Television Actor	Best Supporting Television Actress
**Terry O'Quinn – Lost (ABC)**; Kyle MacLachlan – The Librarian: Quest for the Spear (TNT) as Edward Wilde; James Marsters – Angel (The WB) as Spike; Dominic Monaghan – Lost (ABC) as Charlie Pace; Michael Rosenbaum – Smallville (The WB) as Lex Luthor; Michael Shanks – Stargate SG-1 (Sci-Fi) as Daniel Jackson	**Amanda Tapping – Stargate SG-1 (Sci-Fi) as Samantha Carter**; Amy Acker – Angel (The WB) as Winifred Burkle and Illyria; Erica Durance – Smallville (The WB) as Lois Lane; Torri Higginson – Stargate Atlantis (Sci-Fi); Samantha Mathis – Salem's Lot (TNT); Sonya Walger –The Librarian: Quest for the Spear (TNT) as Nicole Noone

=== DVD ===
Best DVD Release	Best DVD Special Edition Release
**Starship Troopers 2: Hero of the Federation**; Bionicle 2: Legends of Metru-Nui; Ju-on: The Grudge; The Lion King 1½; The Lost Skeleton of Cadavra; Ripley's Game	**The Lord of the Rings: The Return of the King – The Extended Edition**; The Chronicles of Riddick – The Unrated Director's Cut; Hellboy – The Director's Cut; King Arthur – The Extended Unrated Edition; Shrek 2 - Special Edition; Spider-Man 2 – Special Edition
Best Classic Film DVD Release	Best DVD Movie Collection
**Dawn of the Dead**; Aladdin; Dance of the Vampires; Duel; Freaks; THX 1138	**The Star Wars Trilogy**; The Best of Abbott and Costello vol. 1 – 3; The Marx Brothers Silver Collection; The Monster Legacy Collections; The Tarzan Collection; The Ultimate Matrix Collection
Best DVD Television Release	Best Retro Television Series on DVD
**Smallville – Seasons 2 & 3**; Buffy the Vampire Slayer – Seasons 2 & 3; Farscape – Season 4; The Simpsons – Seasons 4 & 5; Star Trek: Voyager – Seasons 1–7; A Wrinkle in Time	**Star Trek: The Original Series – The Complete Series**; Jonny Quest – The Complete Series; Land of the Lost – Seasons 1 & 2; Lost in Space – Seasons 1 & 2; My Favorite Martian – Season 1; Night Gallery – Season 1

== Special awards ==
=== Special Recognition Award ===
- The Star Trek franchise from 1987 to 2005 (Star Trek: The Next Generation, Star Trek: Deep Space Nine, Star Trek: Voyager and Star Trek: Enterprise)

=== Filmmaker's Showcase Award ===
- Kerry Conran

=== Life Career Award ===
- Stephen J. Cannell
- Tom Rothman

=== Service Award ===
- Bill Liebowitz (Posthumously)
