= Walt Conti =

- Born: April 14, 1959 (age 67)
- Other name: Walter Conti
- Occupation: Visual effects artist
- Years active: 1986–present

Walt Conti (born April 14, 1959) is a special effects artist. He was nominated at the 73rd Academy Awards for his work on the film The Perfect Storm in the category of Best Visual Effects. He shared his nomination with Stefen Fangmeier, John Frazier and Habib Zargarpour.

== Selected filmography ==
- Star Trek IV: The Voyage Home (1986)
- Innerspace (1987)
- The Abyss (1989)
- Maverick (1994)
- White Squall (1996)
- Anaconda (1997)
- Deep Blue Sea (1999)
- Cast Away (2000)
- The Perfect Storm (2000)
- Austin Powers in Goldmember (2002)
- The Secret Life of Walter Mitty (2013)
