= Spider-Man (2002 film) =

2002 film by Sam Raimi

- Theatrical release poster
- Directed by: Sam Raimi
- Screenplay by: David Koepp
- Based on: Spider-Man by: Stan Lee; Steve Ditko
- Produced by: Laura Ziskin; Ian Bryce
- Starring: Tobey Maguire; Willem Dafoe; Kirsten Dunst; James Franco; Cliff Robertson; Rosemary Harris
- Cinematography: Don Burgess
- Edited by: Bob Murawski; Arthur Coburn
- Music by: Danny Elfman
- Production companies: Columbia Pictures; Marvel Enterprises; Laura Ziskin Productions
- Distributed by: Sony Pictures Releasing
- Release dates: April 29, 2002 (Fox Westwood Village Theater, Bruin Theater); May 3, 2002 (United States)
- Running time: 121 minutes
- Country: United States
- Language: English
- Budget: $139 million
- Box office: $810.9 million

Spider-Man is a 2002 American superhero film directed by Sam Raimi and written by David Koepp. Based on the Marvel Comics character Spider-Man, it is the first film in Raimi's Spider-Man trilogy (2002–2007), and stars Tobey Maguire, Willem Dafoe, Kirsten Dunst, James Franco, Cliff Robertson, and Rosemary Harris. The plot follows the timid teenager Peter Parker (Maguire), who gains superhuman abilities after being bitten by a genetically engineered spider. He adopts the masked persona "Spider-Man" and begins to fight crime in New York City, facing the malevolent Green Goblin (Dafoe) in the process.

Development of a live-action Spider-Man film began in 1975, but stalled for nearly 25 years due to licensing and financial issues. Columbia Pictures finally licensed the project for a worldwide release in 1999. Koepp was hired to create a working screenplay, which was eventually rewritten by Scott Rosenberg and refined by Alvin Sargent. Various directors were considered before Raimi was hired in 2000. Filming took place in Los Angeles and New York City from January to June 2001. Danny Elfman composed the musical score, while Sony Pictures Imageworks handled the visual effects.

Spider-Man premiered at both the Fox Westwood Village Theater and the Bruin Theater in Los Angeles on April 29, 2002, and was released in the United States on May 3, by Sony Pictures Releasing. It received positive reviews from critics and was a commercial success, becoming the first film to reach $100 million in a single weekend, as well as the most successful film based on a comic book at the time. With a box office gross of $826 million against its $139 million budget, it was the highest-grossing superhero film, the sixth-highest-grossing film overall at the time, and third highest-grossing film of 2002. It garnered nominations for Best Sound and Best Visual Effects at the 75th Academy Awards, among numerous other accolades.

It was followed by two sequels, both directed by Raimi: Spider-Man 2 (2004) and Spider-Man 3 (2007). Maguire and Dafoe later reprised their roles in Spider-Man: No Way Home (2021), which explores the concept of the multiverse and links the Raimi trilogy to the Marvel Cinematic Universe.

== Plot ==
On a high school field trip, Peter Parker visits a Columbia University genetics laboratory with his best friend, Harry Osborn, and his crush, Mary Jane Watson. There, he is bitten by a genetically engineered spider, and falls ill upon returning home. Meanwhile, Harry's father Norman tests a performance-enhancing chemical on himself in an attempt to secure a military contract for Oscorp, the company he founded. The chemical gives him superhuman strength but causes him to go insane and kill one of his scientists.

The next day, Peter develops spider-like abilities, including enhanced strength, senses, agility, and speed; organic webbing in his wrists; and the ability to cling to walls. Hoping to buy a car to impress Mary Jane, Peter enters an underground wrestling event and wins his match, but is swindled out of his earnings. When the wrestling organizer is robbed, a bitter Peter steps out of the way, allowing the thief to escape. Soon after, Peter's Uncle Ben is killed by the same thief. Peter pursues the thief, who eventually falls to his death. Meanwhile, a crazed Norman sabotages a product test by an Oscorp rival and kills several people.

Upon graduating, Peter begins using his abilities to fight crime, donning a costume and adopting the alias Spider-Man. J. Jonah Jameson, the publisher of the Daily Bugle newspaper, hires Peter as a freelance photographer, since he can provide high-quality images of Spider-Man. When Oscorp's board of directors decides to oust Norman and sell the company, Norman uses a disguise to assassinate them during the Unity Day festival. As Spider-Man, Peter fends off Norman and rescues Mary Jane. Afterwards, Jameson bestows the name "Green Goblin" upon the mysterious masked killer.

Norman offers Peter a place at his side, but Peter refuses. They fight, and Peter flees after being wounded. Peter's aunt May invites Mary Jane, Harry, and Norman for Thanksgiving dinner. Norman notices Peter's injury and deduces that he is Spider-Man. Later, Norman attacks and injures May, who is hospitalized. Peter is still unaware of the Goblin's identity, but realizes that the Goblin is targeting his loved ones. While visiting the hospital, Mary Jane confesses to Peter her infatuation with Spider-Man, who has rescued her twice. Harry, who is dating Mary Jane, sees her holding Peter's hand and assumes she has feelings for him. A distraught Harry tells his father about Peter's infatuation with Mary Jane.

That night, Norman captures Mary Jane and a Roosevelt Island Tramway car full of children. He tells Peter to choose whom to rescue, then drops them both from the Queensboro Bridge. Peter saves everyone, then lowers them onto a nearby barge for safety. An enraged Norman throws Peter into a nearby abandoned building, then brutally beats him. After Norman reveals his intentions to kill Mary Jane, Peter finds the strength to fight back. Norman reveals his identity and begs forgiveness, discreetly preparing to impale Peter with his glider. Warned by his spider-sense, Peter dodges the attack, and the glider fatally skewers Norman instead. Before dying, Norman begs Peter not to reveal his identity to Harry. Peter takes Norman's body to the Osborn house, where Harry confronts him, but Peter escapes.

At Norman's funeral, Harry vows revenge on Spider-Man, who he mistakenly believes killed his father. Mary Jane then confesses to Peter that she loves him. However, Peter feels he must protect her from his enemies, so he hides his true feelings and tells her they can only be friends. As Peter leaves, he recalls his uncle's words: "With great power comes great responsibility."

== Cast ==
- Tobey Maguire as Peter Parker / Spider-Man: A high school student who is bitten by a genetically engineered spider. He gains spider-like abilities and begins fighting crime as a masked vigilante.
- Willem Dafoe as Norman Osborn / Green Goblin: A scientist who becomes a costumed terrorist after injecting himself with a chemical formula. He is the founder of Oscorp and the father of Harry Osborn.
- Kirsten Dunst as Mary Jane Watson: Peter's love interest, who is dating Harry.
- James Franco as Harry Osborn: Peter's best friend, Mary Jane's boyfriend, and Norman's son.
- Cliff Robertson as Ben Parker: Peter's paternal uncle.
- Rosemary Harris as May Parker: Peter's paternal aunt.
- J. K. Simmons as J. Jonah Jameson: The Daily Bugle publisher, who considers Spider-Man a menace.

Joe Manganiello plays the bully Flash Thompson, while Michael Papajohn appears as The Carjacker who kills Ben Parker. (Note: The character is referred to as "Dennis Carradine" in the sequel film Spider-Man 3.) Ron Perkins portrays Dr. Mendel Stromm, Norman's head scientist, while Gerry Becker and Jack Betts play the Oscorp board members Maximillian Fargas and Henry Balkan, respectively. Stanley Anderson appears as General Slocum, and K. K. Dodds portrays Norman's assistant Simkins. Bill Nunn, Ted Raimi and Elizabeth Banks play the Daily Bugle employees Joseph "Robbie" Robertson, Ted Hoffman, and Betty Brant, respectively. Tim deZarn and Taylor Gilbert portray Philip Watson and Madeline Watson, respectively. Randy Savage appears as Bonesaw McGraw, Bruce Campbell portrays the Ring Announcer, Octavia Spencer plays the Ring Receptionist, John Paxton plays Bernard Houseman, the Osborn family's butler, and Macy Gray appears as herself. Stan Lee, the co-creator of Spider-Man, has a cameo appearance at the World Unity Fair.

== Production ==
=== Development ===
Beginning in 1975, Marvel Comics made plans to bring its characters to films. By the early 1980s, the company was in negotiations with producers to bring its flagship character Spider-Man to the big screen, a process which was influenced by the critical and commercial success of Superman (1978), which was based on rival DC Comics' flagship character Superman. The producer Roger Corman was the first to hold an option on the Spider-Man property, and began to develop the film at Orion Pictures. Stan Lee, the co-creator of Spider-Man, was brought in to write a screenplay which featured Cold War themes and Doctor Octopus as the primary antagonist. The project did not come to fruition following budgetary disputes between Corman and Lee, as well as the critical and commercial failure of Superman III (1983), which made film adaptations of comic books a hard sell in the industry.

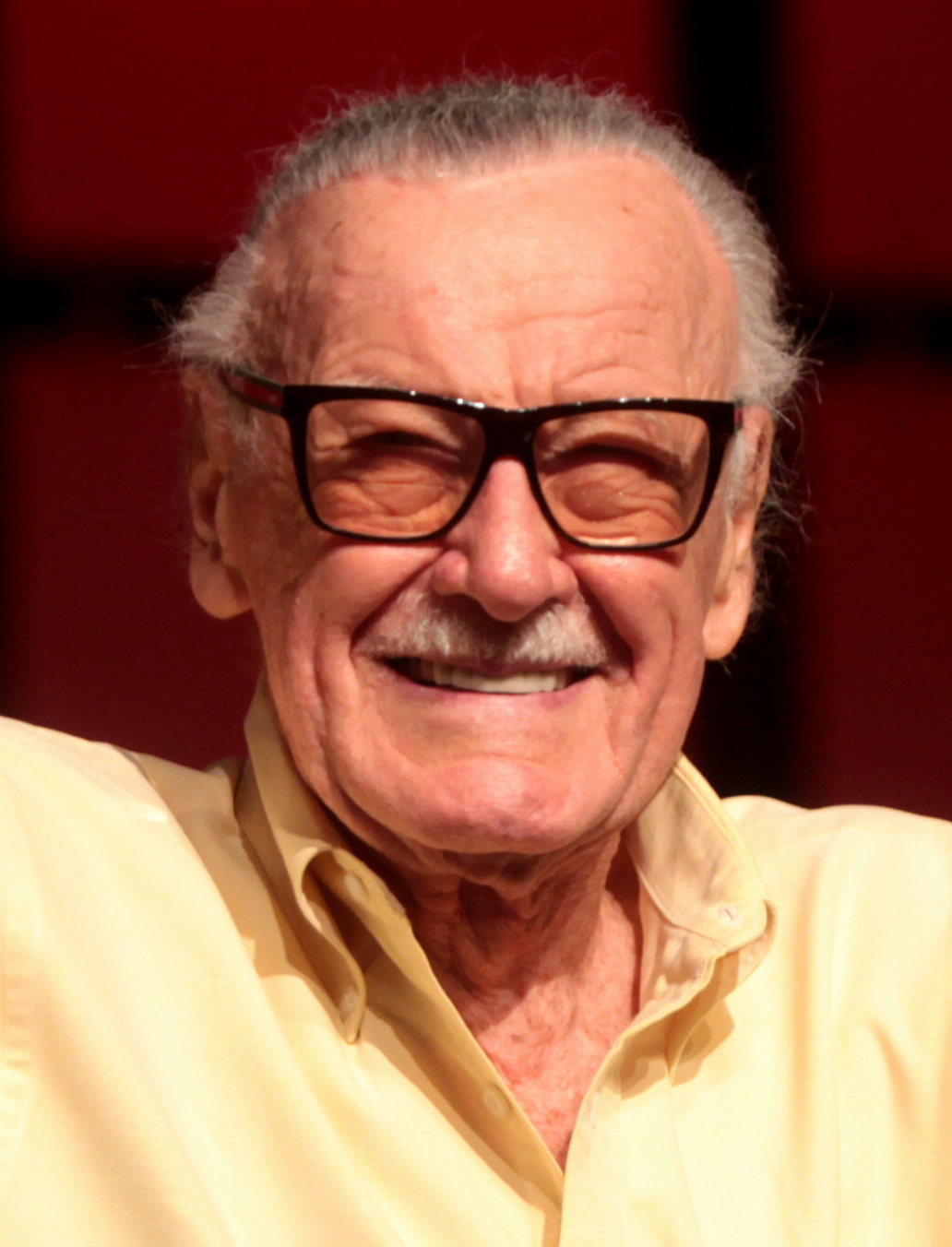
Spider-Man co-creator Stan Lee (pictured in 2014) played a role in the film's development.

The film rights were then acquired by Menahem Golan and Yoram Globus of The Cannon Group for $225,000 in 1985. Golan and Globus were not familiar with Spider-Man and mistook him for a werewolf-like character. Leslie Stevens, creator of The Outer Limits, was hired to write a screenplay based on this concept. Stevens' script depicted Peter Parker as a photographer who is subjected to a mad scientist's experiment, which transforms him into a human tarantula. Tobe Hooper, who was preparing to shoot The Texas Chainsaw Massacre 2 and Invaders from Mars (both 1986) for Cannon, signed on to direct. Lee despised the horror route the studio was taking with the character and demanded that a new script be written that was closer to the source material. By 1985, a new screenplay was being developed by Ted Newsom and John Brancato. In this version, Peter receives his spider-like abilities from a cyclotron experiment. Doctor Octopus served as the antagonist and was written as Peter's mentor-turned-enemy. Barney Cohen was brought in to do a rewrite, which added humor, additional action scenes, and a supporting villain. Newsom and Brancato had John Cusack in mind for the part of Peter Parker.

Cannon hired as director Joseph Zito, who had previously directed the commercially successful Invasion U.S.A. (1985) for the studio. Cannon considered Tom Cruise for the role of Peter Parker, while Zito was interested in casting the actor and stuntman Scott Leva, who had previously done promotional appearances as Spider-Man for Marvel. Bob Hoskins was considered for Doctor Octopus while Lauren Bacall and Katharine Hepburn were considered for Aunt May, while Gregory Peck and Paul Newman were considered for Uncle Ben. Lee expressed his desire to make a cameo appearance as J. Jonah Jameson in the film. The project was tentatively titled Spider-Man: The Movie and was budgeted between $15–20 million. Following the critical and financial failures of two 1987 Cannon films—Superman IV: The Quest for Peace and Masters of the Universe—the budget for Spider-Man: The Movie was cut to $7 million. Zito was unhappy with the lower budget and stepped down as the director. He was replaced by Albert Pyun, but the project was cancelled following Cannon's acquisition by Giancarlo Paretti and Golan's departure from the studio.

Golan extended his option on Spider-Man during his tenure as CEO of 21st Century Film Corporation. By 1989, he was attempting to revive the project using the script, budget, and storyboards developed at Cannon. In order to receive production funds, Golan sold the television rights to Viacom, the home video rights to Columbia Pictures, and the theatrical rights to Carolco Pictures, where James Cameron signed on to write and direct the film. Cameron had previously met with Stan Lee to discuss a possible X-Men film, but Lee convinced Cameron that he would be a good choice to direct a Spider-Man film. (Note: Attributed to multiple references:)

Cameron submitted a treatment to Carolco in 1993, which was a darker, more mature take on the Spider-Man mythos. In addition to Spider-Man's origin story, it also included reimagined versions of the villains Electro and Sandman. Electro was described as a megalomaniacal businessman named Carlton Strand, while Sandman was depicted as Strand's personal bodyguard. Cameron's treatment featured heavy profanity and a sex scene between Spider-Man and Mary Jane Watson atop the Brooklyn Bridge. Carolco set a $50 million budget for the film, but progress stalled when Golan sued Carolco for attempting to make the film without his involvement. Cameron had recently completed True Lies (1994) for Twentieth Century Fox, and the studio unsuccessfully attempted to acquire the Spider-Man film rights for him. Cameron then abandoned the film and began work on Titanic (1997) and other projects. He revealed in a 1997 interview that he had the Titanic star Leonardo DiCaprio in mind for the role of Peter Parker.

In 1995, Metro-Goldwyn-Mayer (MGM) acquired 21st Century Film Corporation's rights to produce the film, which gave them access to previous Spider-Man scripts. MGM then sued Viacom, Sony Pictures, and Marvel, which they accused of fraud in the original deal with Cannon. The following year, 21st Century, Carolco, and Marvel all filed for bankruptcy.

Following the disastrous reception of Batman & Robin in 1997, film studios viewed comics as merely for children and did not take the superhero genre seriously. No studio showed interest in a Spider-Man film until the release of Blade in 1998 and the development of X-Men (2000), projects which convinced some studios that a Marvel character could carry a film. Marvel emerged from bankruptcy in 1998 and declared that Menahem Golan's option had expired and that the rights had reverted to them. Marvel then sold the rights to Sony for $7 million. Although Sony optioned from MGM all preceding Spider-Man screenplays, it only exercised the options on "the Cameron material", which contractually included a multi-author screenplay and a forty-five-page "scriptment" credited only to Cameron. However, the studio announced it was not hiring Cameron to direct the film nor would it be using his script.

Sony lined up several potential directors, including Michael Bay, Jan de Bont, Tim Burton, Chris Columbus, Roland Emmerich, David Fincher, Ang Lee, Baz Luhrmann, Tony Scott, M. Night Shyamalan and Barry Sonnenfeld. (Note: Attributed to multiple references:) Fincher considered taking the job, but did not want to depict Spider-Man's origin story, as he felt it was "dumb". He proposed basing the film on The Night Gwen Stacy Died storyline, but the studio was not interested in that approach. (Note: Attributed to multiple references:) Columbus turned down the project and directed Harry Potter and the Sorcerer's Stone (2001) instead.

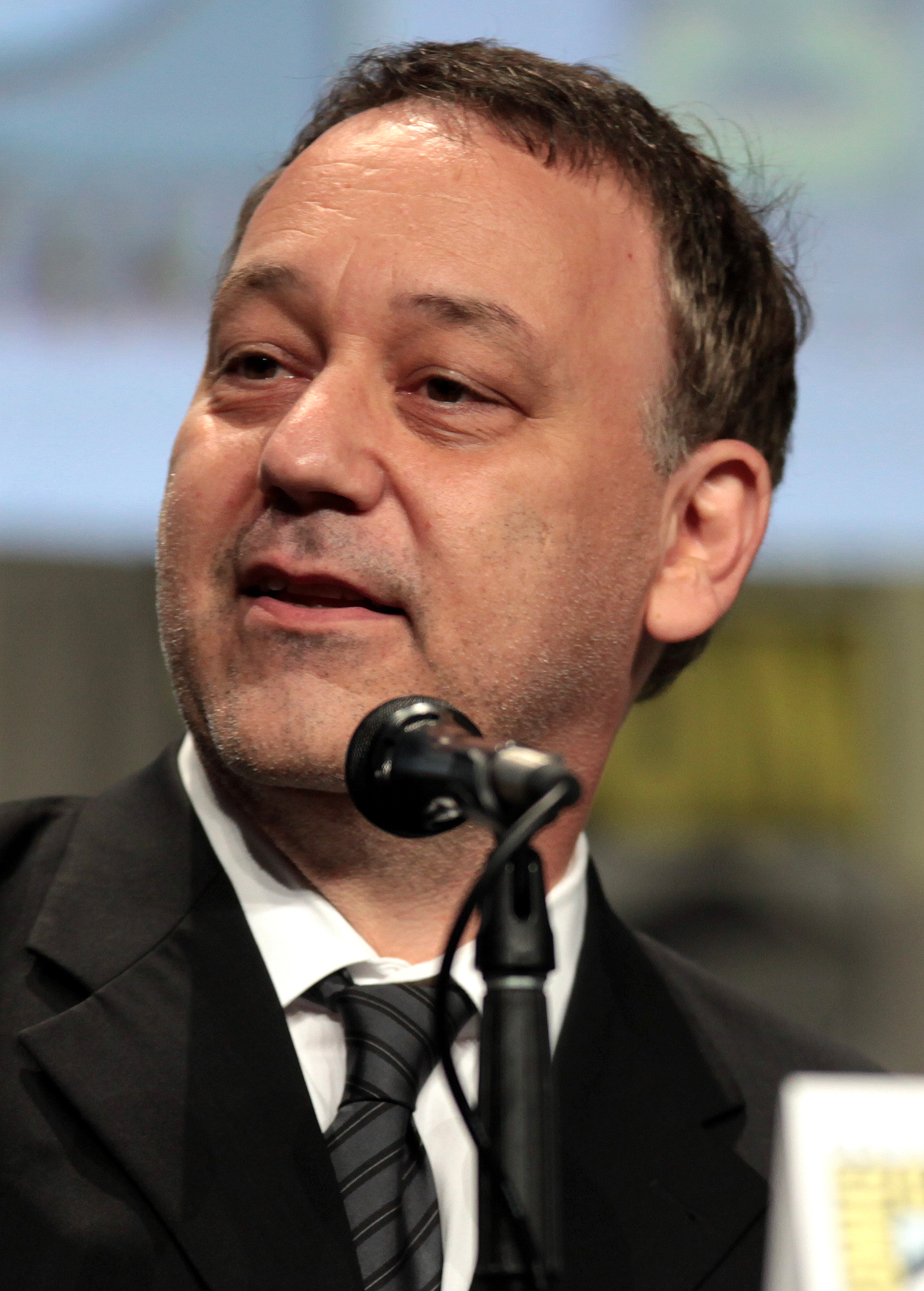
Director Sam Raimi, pictured in 2014

The chair of Columbia Pictures, Amy Pascal, had a first choice for director: Sam Raimi, who was a fan of the Spider-Man comics during his youth. However, Raimi's agent warned him that he was not Sony's preferred choice. During a meeting with Pascal, Sony Pictures CEO John Calley, Marvel Films chief Avi Arad, Sony executive Matt Tolmach, and the film's producer, Laura Ziskin, Raimi pitched himself as the ideal director for the project. He abruptly ended his pitch after one hour, not wanting to overstay his welcome if the executives did not want him. However, Raimi's passion for Spider-Man earned him the job. He was attached to direct in January 2000, for a summer 2001 release.

David Koepp was brought aboard to write the screenplay. Cameron's script was the foundation for his first draft, often word for word. Koepp pitched the idea that Peter should not get his Spider-Man suit until halfway through the film, so his origin story could be lengthened. He also proposed that Peter and Mary Jane should not be a couple by the end of the film, feeling it was more romantic if they remained apart. In this version of the script, Electro was the main antagonist.

Koepp would eventually change the main antagonist to the Green Goblin and add Doctor Octopus as a secondary villain. However, Raimi cut Doctor Octopus from the story to focus on the surrogate father-son dynamic between Norman Osborn and Peter Parker, which he found interesting. In June 2000, Scott Rosenberg was hired to rewrite Koepp's material. Remaining a constant in all the rewrites was Cameron's idea that Peter shoots organic webbing from his wrists, as opposed to him inventing mechanical webshooters, which is how he shoots webs in the comics. Raimi felt the mechanical webshooters would stretch the audience's suspension of disbelief too far. This decision was controversial with long-time fans of the comics.

As production neared, Alvin Sargent was hired by Ziskin to polish the dialogue, primarily between Peter and Mary Jane. Although Rosenberg, Sargent, and Cameron all could have received credit for the final Spider-Man script, all three voluntarily relinquished credit to Koepp.

=== Casting ===
For the role of Peter Parker / Spider-Man, the filmmakers sought an actor who was not excessively tall or handsome, but who had the "heart and soul" for the audience to identify with. The studio expressed interest in Wes Bentley, Zach Braff, Chris Klein, Jude Law, Heath Ledger, Ewan McGregor, Freddie Prinze Jr. and Chris O'Donnell. Leonardo DiCaprio had been considered for the role in 1995 by James Cameron. (Note: Attributed to multiple references:) Colin Farrell, James Franco, Jay Rodan and Scott Speedman were involved in screen tests for the part. Joe Manganiello auditioned, but was cast as the bully Flash Thompson instead.

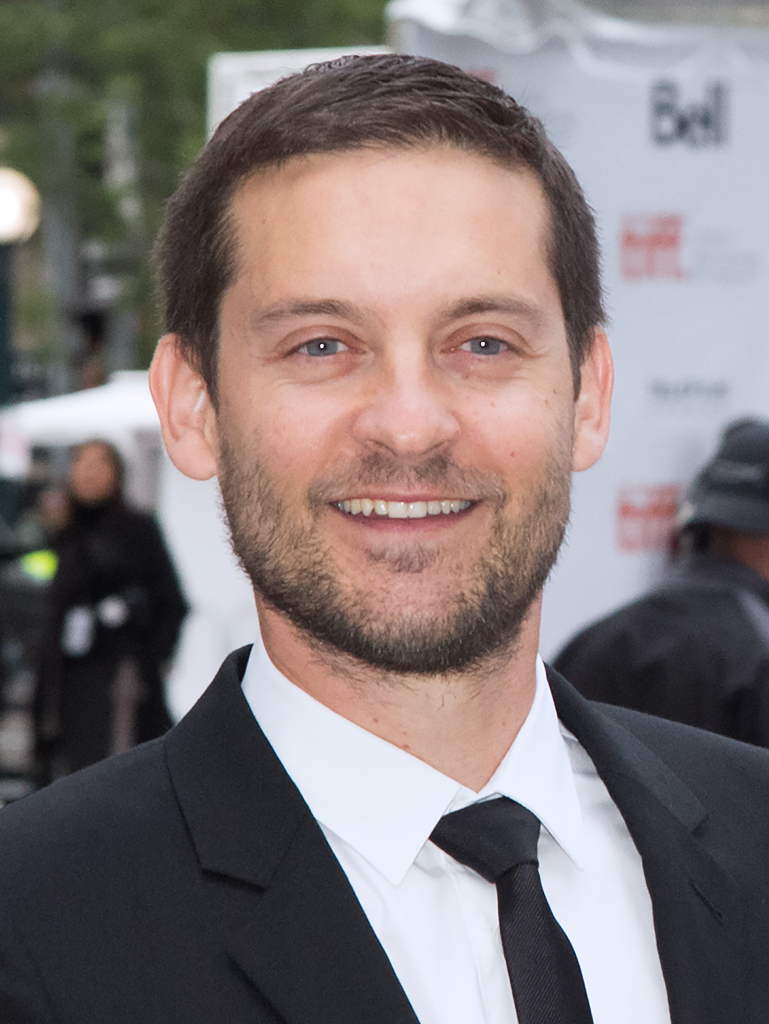
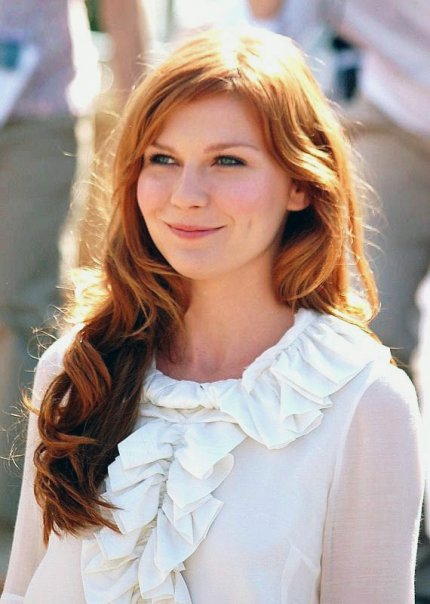
Tobey Maguire (left, pictured in 2014) and Kirsten Dunst (2006)

Tobey Maguire was Raimi's first choice for Peter Parker after he saw him in The Cider House Rules (1999). The studio was initially hesitant to cast someone who did not seem like a "adrenaline-pumping, tail-kicking titan", but Maguire impressed studio executives with his audition. He was cast in the role in July 2000, and signed a deal in the range of $3 to $4 million with higher salary options for two sequels. To prepare for the role, Maguire improved his physique over several months by training with a physical trainer, a yoga instructor, a martial arts expert, and a climbing expert. He studied spiders and learned how to perform arachnid-like movements.

Nicolas Cage, Billy Crudup, Jason Isaacs, John Malkovich and Billy Bob Thornton were considered for the role of Norman Osborn / Green Goblin, but all turned it down. (Note: Attributed to multiple references:) Willem Dafoe was selected for the part in November 2000. He was intrigued by the prospect of working with Raimi and by the idea of a film based on comics. (Note: Attributed to multiple references:) He insisted on wearing the Green Goblin costume himself, as he felt that a stuntman would not convey the character's necessary body language. The 580-piece suit took half an hour to put on.

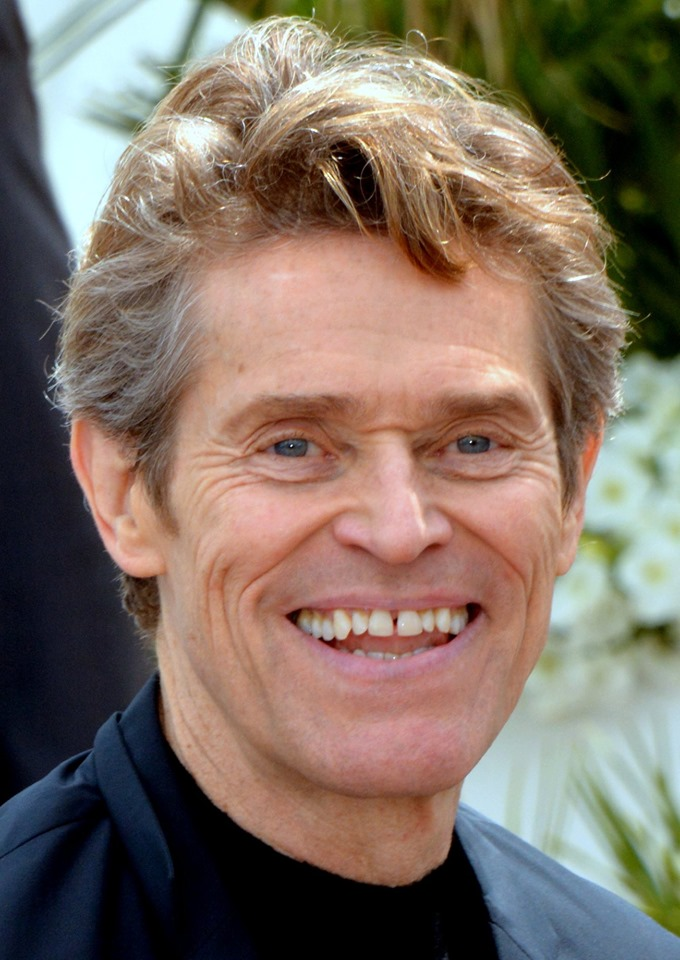
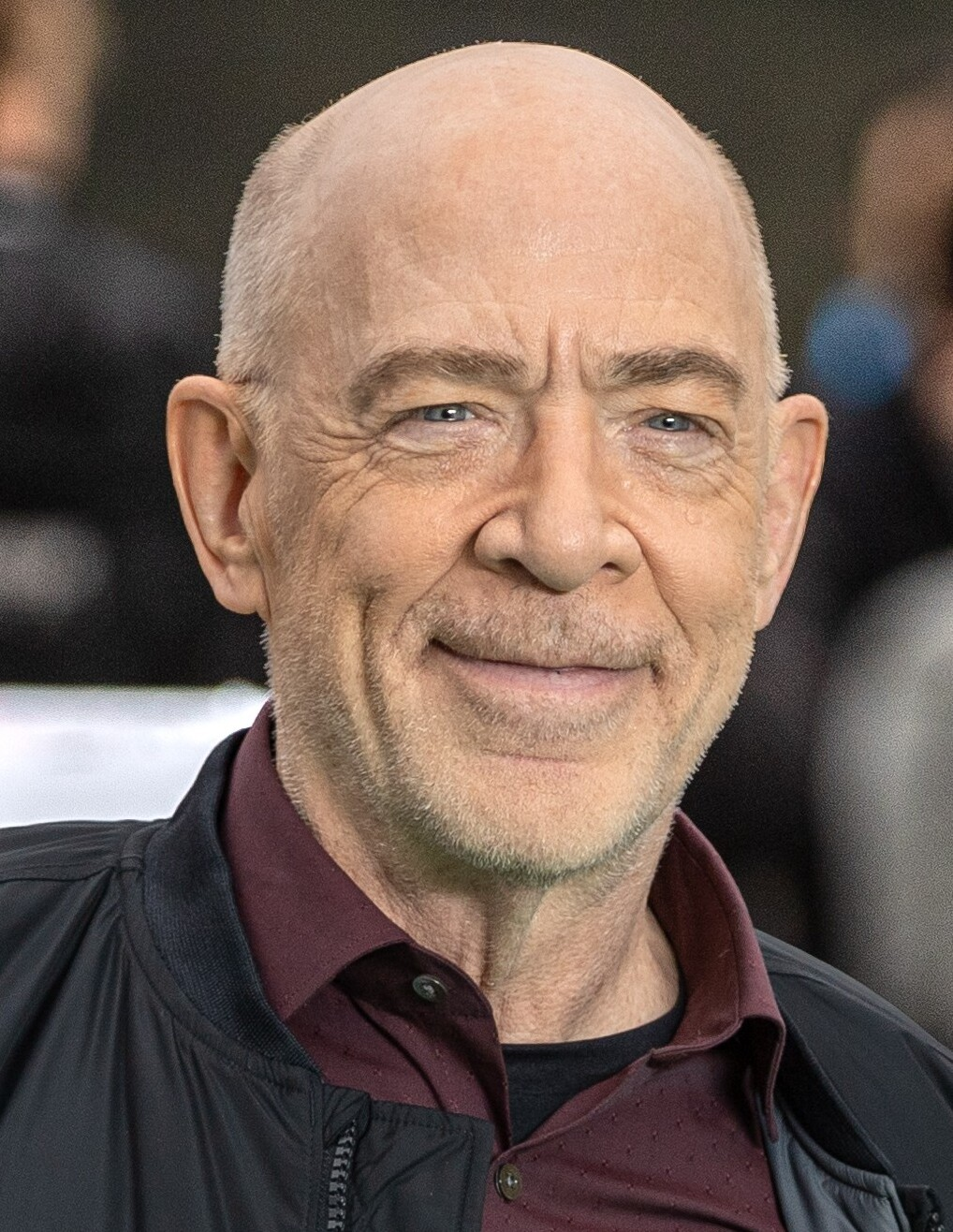
Willem Dafoe (left, pictured in 2019) and J. K. Simmons (2024)

Kate Bosworth, Julia Stiles, Eliza Dushku, Jaime King and Mena Suvari all auditioned for the role of Mary Jane Watson. (Note: Attributed to multiple references:) Alicia Witt was considered for the role, and Kate Hudson was offered the part but turned it down to star in The Four Feathers (2002) instead. (Note: Attributed to multiple references:) Elizabeth Banks auditioned, but at 26 she was deemed too old, despite being only sixteen months older than Maguire. Banks was cast as Jameson's secretary Betty Brant instead, and 18-year-old Kirsten Dunst was cast as Mary Jane a month before filming began. (Note: Attributed to multiple references:) To create Mary Jane's red hair, Dunst's hair was dyed in the front and she wore a half-wig. The producers wanted Dunst to get her teeth straightened, but she refused.

Stan Lee was interested in playing J. Jonah Jameson, but the filmmakers felt he was too old to convincingly play the part. Lee was supportive of the eventual casting of J. K. Simmons, feeling that Simmons gave a better performance than he could have achieved. Hugh Jackman was supposed to have a cameo as the X-Men film series character Wolverine, but the appearance was scrapped after the production team realized they did not have the Wolverine costume.

=== Design ===
The first version of the Green Goblin's headgear was an animatronic mask created by Amalgamated Dynamics. Dafoe described it as a "silly looking" Halloween mask. The second version was a helmet that Dafoe termed "very angular, very modern ... more like an armor." Dafoe wanted the costume to be flexible enough to allow him to do the splits.

The Spider-Man suit worn by Maguire took six months to create. It was one piece, including the mask and boots. The eye lenses were hand-sculpted by Hans Moritz, who had created the visor for the character Cyclops in X-Men (2000). An alternate suit with a detachable mask was used for scenes in which Spider-Man takes his mask off. (Note: Attributed to multiple references:)

A Steatoda grossa spider was used for the genetically modified spider that bites Peter and gives him his abilities. It was painted with red and blue makeup.

=== Filming ===
Principal photography for Spider-Man began on January 8, 2001, in Culver City, California. The cinematographer, Don Burgess, shot the film with Panavision Platinum and Millennium XL cameras and Primo lenses. Sequences in Peter's home and in the wrestling arena were filmed on soundstages. The Times Square sequence in which Spider-Man and the Green Goblin fight for the first time was filmed on soundstages and in Downey, California. In Downey, a construction worker named Tim Holcombe was killed when a forklift modified as a construction crane crashed into the construction basket he was in. The following court case led the state of California to fine Sony $58,805.

In a now-iconic scene, Mary Jane kisses Peter while he is hanging upside down in the rain. To prepare for the scene, Dunst was given a book describing famous film kisses. During filming, water was pouring into Maguire's nose, which made it difficult for him to breathe. (Note: Attributed to multiple references:) For the wrestling scene, Randy Savage insisted on doing his own stunts, one of which resulted in injury. The shot in which Peter catches Mary Jane's food tray was achieved without visual effects and with Maguire's hand glued to the tray. The shot took 156 takes and 16 hours to accomplish. While performing a stunt, Maguire's stunt double fractured his leg.

In Los Angeles, filming locations included the Natural History Museum for the Columbia University laboratory where Peter is bitten, the Pacific Electricity Building for the Daily Bugle offices, and Greystone Mansion for the interiors of Norman's home. On April 4, Spider-Man costumes were stolen, and Sony put up a $25,000 reward for their return. They were recovered after 18 months; a former studio security guard and an accomplice were arrested. (Note: Attributed to multiple references:)

In New York City, filming took place at the Queensboro Bridge, Columbia University's Low Memorial Library, the New York Public Library, the Sunnyside neighborhood of Queens, and a rooftop garden at the Rockefeller Center. (Note: Attributed to multiple references:) The Flatiron Building was used for the offices of the Daily Bugle. Production then returned to Los Angeles, and filming wrapped in June 2001. After the September 11 attacks, certain sequences were re-filmed and a shot of the Twin Towers was removed from the film. (Note: Attributed to multiple references:)

=== Visual effects ===
John Dykstra was hired as the film's visual effects supervisor in May 2000. He convinced Raimi to use computer-generated imagery (CGI) for many of the physically impossible stunts. Raimi—who had used more traditional special effects in his previous films—worked hard to plan all the sequences of Spider-Man swinging from buildings, which he described as "ballet in the sky." The complexity of such sequences meant the budget rose from an initially planned $70 million to around $100 million. Spider-Man and the Green Goblin had to be shot separately for effects shots: Spider-Man was shot in front of a greenscreen, while the Goblin was shot against a bluescreen. Shooting them together would have resulted in one character being erased from a shot. (Note: Attributed to multiple references:)

Dykstra said the greatest difficulty of creating Spider-Man was that, as the character was masked, it immediately lost a lot of characterization. Without the context of eyes or mouth, a lot of body language had to be put in so that there would be emotional content. Raimi wanted to convey the essence of Spider-Man as being "the transition that occurs between him being a young man going through puberty and being a superhero." Dykstra said his crew of animators had never reached such a level of sophistication to give subtle hints of still making Spider-Man feel like a human being. When two studio executives were shown shots of the computer generated character, they believed it was actually Maguire performing stunts. In addition, Dykstra's crew had to composite areas of New York City and replace every car in shots with digital models. Raimi did not want it to feel entirely like animation, so none of the shots were 100% computer-generated.

== Release ==
=== Marketing ===
After the September 11 attacks occurred in 2001, Sony recalled a Spider-Man teaser poster and a teaser trailer, both of which depicted the Twin Towers of the World Trade Center. The poster showed a close-up of Spider-Man's face with the towers reflected in the eye of his mask, while the trailer showed a helicopter getting caught in a giant spider web between the towers. (Note: Attributed to multiple references:) The trailer, which according to Sony did not contain any actual footage from the film, was also removed from the home video release of A Knight's Tale (2001). (Note: Attributed to multiple references:) Raimi later stated that the helicopter scene was originally in the film, but was removed after the attacks.

To promote the film, Sony partnered with CKE Restaurants to release Spider-Man products at Hardee's and Carl's Jr. restaurants. Beginning in April 2002, the restaurants offered Spider-Man cups and toys, as well as Spider-Man figures that could be attached to a car radio antenna. KFC offered Spider-Man kids' meal toys in the United Kingdom. Other promotional partners included Dr Pepper, Hershey's, Kellogg's, and Reebok.

=== Box office ===
Spider-Man was originally scheduled for release on November 2, 2001. Due to an extended post-production schedule, the release was postponed until May 3, 2002, when the film was released in 18 markets. (Note: Attributed to multiple references:) According to Rick Lyman of The New York Times, film industry executives expected Spider-Man to have a strong opening. Competition from other films was limited, and polls showed strong interest in Raimi's film from every age group. However, neither executives nor polling firms predicted that the film's earnings would exceed those of Harry Potter and the Sorcerer's Stone (2001). Upon release, Spider-Man became the number one film at the box office, beating out The Scorpion King. (Note: Attributed to multiple references:) In the United States and Canada, it opened on 7,500 screens at 3,615 theaters, making it the third-widest release at the time, behind Sorcerer's Stone and Mission: Impossible 2 (2000). (Note: Attributed to multiple references:) During its opening weekend, the film earned $114.8 million, surpassing Sorcerer's Stone to set a record for the largest opening weekend in history. (Note: Attributed to multiple references:) Spider-Man became the first film to gross $100 million in a single weekend (even when adjusting for inflation), and the first film to reach $100 million in three days. It also set a record for highest three-day gross. (Note: Attributed to multiple references:)

Spider-Man earned $39.4 million on its opening day, an average of $10,901 per theater. This opening-day gross was the all-time highest until 2004, when it was surpassed by the $40.4 million opening of its sequel, Spider-Man 2. During opening weekend, Spider-Man grossed an average of $31,769 per theater. According to Box Office Mojo, this was the all-time highest per-theater average for an "ultra-wide release." On its second day of release, the film set a record for the highest earnings in a single day, with $43.6 million. (Note: Attributed to multiple references:) On its third day, Spider-Man earned $31.8 million, the highest gross at the time for a Sunday. Within four days, the film had the biggest non-holiday Monday of all time with $11 million, which increased its total gross to $125.1 million.

Spider-Man remained at the top of the box office in its second weekend above newcomers Unfaithful and The New Guy, dropping 38% and grossing another $71.4 million while averaging $19,756 per theater; this was the highest-grossing second weekend for any film at the time. Spider-Man reached $200 million on its ninth day of release, making it the fastest film to cross this mark, surpassing Star Wars: Episode I – The Phantom Menace (1999). (Note: Attributed to multiple references:) At the end of its second weekend, the film had earned a 10-day total of $223 million, and it quickly surpassed Ice Age to become the highest-grossing film of the year.

The film dropped to the second position in its third weekend, behind Star Wars: Episode II – Attack of the Clones, but still made $45 million, dropping 37% and averaging $12,458 per theater, which brought its 17-day tally to $285.6 million. Its third weekend haul set the record for highest-grossing third weekend, which was first surpassed by Avatar in 2009. Spider-Man would beat another record that was previously held by The Phantom Menace, becoming the quickest film to hit $300 million in just 22 days. It stayed at the second position in its fourth weekend, grossing $35.8 million over the four-day Memorial Day weekend, dropping only 21% while expanding to 3,876 theaters, averaging $9,240 over four days, and bringing the 25-day gross to $333.6 million. Within 66 days, Spider-Man reached a total gross of $400 million.

Spider-Man became 2002's highest-grossing film with $407.8 million in the US and Canada, surpassing The Lord of the Rings: The Two Towers and Attack of the Clones. As of 2024, Spider-Man ranks as the 77th-highest-grossing film of all time in the US and Canada, not adjusted for inflation. The film sold an estimated 69.5 million tickets in the US.

Outside the US and Canada, Spider-Man opened in 17 territories in its first week, earning a total of $13.3 million. It set a record for the highest opening gross in Spain and Switzerland; the second-highest opening in Iceland, Singapore and South Korea; and the third-highest opening in Russia, Germany and Yugoslavia. (Note: Attributed to multiple references:) In the United Kingdom, Spider-Man made $13.9 million from 509 screens in its first week, making it the country's fifth biggest opening. It stayed at number one for three weeks, until it was displaced by Minority Report. In India, Spider-Man was Sony's first major release since Godzilla in 1998. It was simultaneously released in English, Hindi, Tamil and Telugu across 250 screens, becoming the widest reach and return for a Hollywood film since The Mummy Returns (2001). The international markets that generated grosses in excess of $10 million include Australia ($16.9 million), Brazil ($17.4 million), Germany ($30.7 million), Italy ($20.8 million), Japan ($56.2 million), Mexico ($31.2 million), South Korea ($16.98 million), Spain ($23.7 million), and the multi-nation markets of the United Kingdom, Ireland and Malta ($45.8 million), and France, Algeria, Monaco, Morocco and Tunisia ($32.9 million).

Outside the US and Canada, Spider-Man grossed $418 million and was the third-highest-grossing film of 2002, behind The Two Towers and Harry Potter and the Chamber of Secrets. Worldwide, the film's gross was now $825.8 million, making it the 58th-highest-grossing film of all time. Spider-Man also set records for the highest-grossing Sony film and the highest-grossing superhero film, surpassing Men in Black (1997) and Batman (1989) respectively. (Note: Spider-Man was Sony's highest-grossing film domestically until 2018, when it was surpassed by Jumanji: Welcome to the Jungle ($404.5 million).) (Note: Attributed to multiple references:)

Spider-Man was re-released in theaters on April 15, 2024, as part of Columbia Pictures' 100th anniversary celebration. It was re-released again on September 26, 2025 as part of a collaboration between Sony and Fathom Events. An encore screening followed on October 3, 2025.

=== Ratings in the United Kingdom ===
In the United Kingdom, Spider-Man was given a "12" rating, meaning that no child under the age of 12 could see the film in a theater. In applying the rating, the British Board of Film Classification (BBFC) claimed that the film depicted strong violence as an appropriate solution to problems. Some local councils, pressured by cinema operators, changed the rating in their jurisdictions so that younger children could see the film. John Wilkinson, chairman of the Cinema Exhibitors' Association, said that theaters wanted a lower rating to avoid complaints from parents of young children who wanted to see Spider-Man. (Note: Attributed to multiple references:) In late August, the BBFC changed the "12" rating to "12A", meaning children under 12 could watch a film if accompanied by an adult. Following the change, Sony re-released Spider-Man with the 12A rating. (Note: Attributed to multiple references:)

== Home media ==
Spider-Man was released on VHS and DVD on November 5, 2002, in North America and Australia, and on November 25, 2002, in the United Kingdom. Sony spent over $100 million marketing the DVD, which sold over 7 million copies on its first day of release, surpassing Monsters, Inc. (2001) to set a record for the highest single-day DVD sales. (Note: Attributed to multiple references:) Although Finding Nemo (2003) would break the single-day record, Spider-Man still holds the record for the most DVD sales in one day for a live-action film as of 2022. Spider-Man was also the second-highest-selling DVD of 2002, after The Lord of the Rings: The Fellowship of the Ring (2001). By July 2004, the film's U.S. DVD revenue was $338.8 million, while its U.S. VHS revenue was $89.2 million. To date, over 19.5 million DVD copies and 6.5 million VHS copies of Spider-Man have been sold. (Note: Attributed to multiple references:) The film's two-disc DVD release comes in separate widescreen (1.85:1 aspect ratio) and fullscreen (1.33:1 aspect ratio) versions. Bonus features include commentaries, promotional material, and behind-the-scenes featurettes.

The film's US television rights (Fox, TBS/TNT) were sold for $60 million, and sales of licensed toys related to the film have surpassed $109 million. By 2006, Spider-Man had a total gross of $1.5 billion from box office and home video (sales and rentals), with a further $880 million from television (pay-per-view, broadcast TV and cable TV).

Spider-Man was first released on Blu-ray in 2007 as part of the Spider-Man Trilogy. It had standalone Blu-ray releases in 2010 and 2011. In 2017, the film was included in the Spider-Man Legacy Collection, a set of five Spider-Man films on 4K Ultra HD Blu-ray. Raimi's Spider-Man trilogy was released on Disney+ on April 21, 2023.

== Reception ==
=== Critical response ===
On the review aggregator website Rotten Tomatoes, 90% of 277 critics' reviews are positive. The website's consensus reads: "Not only does Spider-Man provide a good dose of web-swinging fun, but it also has a heart, thanks to the combined charms of director Sam Raimi and star Tobey Maguire." Metacritic, which uses a weighted average, assigned the film a score of 73 out of 100, based on 38 critics, indicating "generally favorable" reviews. Audiences polled by CinemaScore gave the film an average grade of "A−" on an A+ to F scale.

Eric Harrison of the Houston Chronicle called the film "a nimble, spirited tale that adroitly captures the flavor of Spider-Man comics" but gets weighed down by "the lugubrious trappings of big-budget fantasy movies." He praised Maguire's casting, saying it was difficult to imagine anyone else in the role. Owen Gleiberman of Entertainment Weekly described Spider-Man as exciting but campy. He felt that Maguire gave a "winning" performance, but was unable "to bring the two sides of Spidey—the boy and the man, the romantic and the avenger—together." Mike Clark of USA Today lauded the film's casting, action sequences and production value. In his review for The Wall Street Journal, Joe Morgenstern applauded Maguire's performance but criticized the "strident intensity" of Dafoe, claiming that he delivered a poor villain compared to Gene Hackman in Superman and Jack Nicholson in Batman. Kirk Honeycutt of The Hollywood Reporter praised the creativity of the opening credits and the upside-down kiss scene. Several reviewers felt that Spider-Man was not as good as Raimi's 1990 film Darkman. (Note: Attributed to multiple references:)

Writing in LA Weekly, Manohla Dargis said that Spider-Man as a character was "not particularly interesting" in Raimi's film, and that the action scenes felt unconvincing and forced. Roger Ebert of the Chicago Sun-Times criticized the action sequences, particularly the scene in which Peter is given a choice between saving Mary Jane or a cable car full of children. He said the scene could have expressed great emotional tension, but instead felt like a "bloodless storyboard." In a 2007 retrospective on the first two Spider-Man films, Richard George of IGN called the Green Goblin's costume "almost comically bad". He wrote of the Goblin's mask: "Not only is it not frightening, it prohibits expression."

Music critic Christian Clemmensen of Filmtracks described Danny Elfman's score as "a colorful work with streaking flashes of acoustics, electronics, and choir" which has "all the basic ingredients of a strong superhero score". He felt the musical theme for the character Spider-Man provides a "satisfying identity", but the theme for Norman Osborn / Green Goblin fails to be memorable, although it effectively expresses the character's insanity. Neil Shurley of AllMusic called Elfman's score "intricate, propulsive music" which delivers a "richly detailed soundscape". He said the score was perfect for the film.

Entertainment Weekly put the upside-down kiss on its 2009 list of the best pop culture creations of the decade, saying: "There's a fine line between romantic and corny. And the rain-soaked smooch ... tap-dances right on that line. The reason it works? Even if she suspects he's Peter Parker, she doesn't try to find out. And that's sexy." In 2008, Empire magazine ranked Spider-Man 437th on its list of the 500 best films of all time.

=== Accolades ===
Spider-Man won various awards, and was nominated for Best Visual Effects and Best Sound at the 75th Academy Awards. Raimi, Maguire, Dunst and Elfman were all nominated for Saturn Awards, with Elfman winning for his musical score. Spider-Man won the People's Choice Award for "Favorite Motion Picture", and was nominated for Favorite Movie at the Nickelodeon Kids' Choice Awards. The upside-down kiss scene won Best Kiss at the 2003 MTV Movie Awards.

Award	Date of ceremony	Category	Recipients	Result
Academy Awards	March 23, 2003	Best Sound	Kevin O'Connell, Greg P. Russell and Ed Novick	Nominated
Academy Awards	March 23, 2003	Best Visual Effects	John Dykstra, Scott Stokdyk, Anthony LaMolinara and John Frazier	Nominated
BMI Film and TV Awards	May 14, 2003	BMI Film Music Award	Danny Elfman	Won
British Academy Film Awards	February 23, 2003	Best Achievement in Special Visual Effects	John Dykstra, Scott Stokdyk, John Frazier, Anthony LaMolinara, John Dykstra, Scott Stokdyk, John Frazier and Anthony LaMolinara	Nominated
Broadcast Film Critics Association	January 17, 2003	Best Song	Chad Kroeger ("Hero")	Nominated
Empire Awards	February 5, 2003	Best Actress	Kirsten Dunst	Won
Golden Trailer Awards	March 14, 2002	Best Action	Spider-Man	Nominated
Golden Trailer Awards	March 14, 2002	Best Music	Spider-Man	Nominated
Golden Trailer Awards	March 14, 2002	Best of Show	Spider-Man	Nominated
Golden Trailer Awards	March 14, 2002	Best Voice Over	Spider-Man	Won
Grammy Award	February 23, 2003	Best Score Soundtrack Album for a Motion Picture, Television or Other Visual Media	Danny Elfman	Nominated
Grammy Award	February 23, 2003	Best Song Written for a Motion Picture, Television or Other Visual Media	Chad Kroeger ("Hero")	Nominated
Hugo Awards	August 30, 2003	Best Dramatic Presentation – Long Form	Spider-Man	Nominated
Kids' Choice Awards	April 12, 2003	Favorite Movie	Spider-Man	Nominated
Kids' Choice Awards	April 12, 2003	Favorite Movie Actress	Kirsten Dunst	Nominated
Kids' Choice Awards	April 12, 2003	Favorite Male Butt Kicker	Tobey Maguire	Nominated
MTV Movie Awards	May 31, 2003	Best Female Performance	Kirsten Dunst	Won
MTV Movie Awards	May 31, 2003	Best Kiss	Tobey Maguire and Kirsten Dunst	Won
MTV Movie Awards	May 31, 2003	Best Male Performance	Tobey Maguire	Nominated
MTV Movie Awards	May 31, 2003	Best Movie	Spider-Man	Nominated
MTV Movie Awards	May 31, 2003	Best Villain	Willem Dafoe	Nominated
People's Choice Awards	January 12, 2003	Favorite Motion Picture	Spider-Man	Nominated
Satellite Awards	January 12, 2003	Best Film Editing	Eric Zumbrunnen	Nominated
Satellite Awards	January 12, 2003	Best Visual Effects	John Dykstra	Nominated
Saturn Awards	May 18, 2003	Best Fantasy Film	Spider-Man	Nominated
Saturn Awards	May 18, 2003	Best Actor	Tobey Maguire	Nominated
Saturn Awards	May 18, 2003	Best Actress	Kirsten Dunst	Nominated
Saturn Awards	May 18, 2003	Best Director	Sam Raimi	Nominated
Saturn Awards	May 18, 2003	Best Music	Danny Elfman	Won
Saturn Awards	May 18, 2003	Best Special Effects	John Dykstra, Scott Stokdyk, Anthony LaMolinara and John Frazier	Nominated
Teen Choice Awards	August 19, 2002	Choice Movie: Drama/Action Adventure	Spider-Man	Won
Teen Choice Awards	August 19, 2002	Choice Movie Actor: Drama/Action Adventure	Tobey Maguire	Won
Teen Choice Awards	August 19, 2002	Choice Movie Actress: Drama/Action Adventure	Kirsten Dunst	Nominated
Teen Choice Awards	August 19, 2002	Choice Movie Sleazebag	Willem Dafoe	Nominated
Teen Choice Awards	August 19, 2002	Choice Movie Liplock	Tobey Maguire and Kirsten Dunst	Won
Teen Choice Awards	August 19, 2002	Choice Movie Hissy Fit	Willem Dafoe	Nominated
World Soundtrack Awards	October 19, 2002	Best Original Soundtrack of the Year – Orchestral	Danny Elfman	Nominated
World Stunt Awards	June 1, 2003	Best Fight	Chris Daniels, Zach Hudson, Kim Kahana Jr., Johnny Nguyen, and Mark Aaron Wagner	Nominated
Young Artist Awards	March 29, 2003	Best Family Feature Film - Fantasy	Spider-Man	Nominated

== Sequels and other media ==
Two sequels to Spider-Man were released, both directed by Raimi. Spider-Man 2 was released on June 30, 2004, while Spider-Man 3 was released on May 4, 2007. A spin-off animated series, Spider-Man: The New Animated Series, aired from July to September 2003. It was intended to serve as a continuation of the first film.

A video game based on Spider-Man was released in 2002, titled Spider-Man. The game was developed by Treyarch and published by Activision, and released for Game Boy Advance, GameCube, Microsoft Windows, PlayStation 2, and Xbox. Tobey Maguire and Willem Dafoe were the only Spider-Man actors who worked on the game, which has scenes and characters that do not appear in the film. The game was followed by two sequels, Spider-Man 2 and Spider-Man 3, both of which were used to promote their respective films. Another game, Spider-Man: Friend or Foe, was released in 2007.

By July 2006, combined U.S. sales of various Spider-Man console games released in the 2000s reached 6 million units. By this time, the PlayStation 2 version of Spider-Man had sold 2.1 million copies and earned $74 million in the United States. The magazine Next Generation ranked it as the 15th highest-selling game launched for the GameCube, PlayStation 2 or Xbox between January 2000 and July 2006 in the United States.

== See also ==
- Spider-Man (soundtrack)
