= Joseph Goss =

American special effects artist

- Born: Joseph Franklin Goss; November 13, 1914; Ray, Indiana, U.S.
- Died: August 5, 2005 (aged 90); North Hollywood, California, U.S.
- Occupation: Special effects artist

Joseph Franklin Goss (November 13, 1914 – August 5, 2005) was an American special effects artist. He won a Primetime Emmy Award in the category Outstanding Individual Achievement in Creative Technical Crafts for his work on the television program Battlestar Galactica. His win was shared with John Dykstra and Richard Edlund.

Goss died on August 5, 2005, in North Hollywood, California, at the age of 90.
