= Jeffrey J. Haboush =

American sound engineer

- Occupation: Sound engineer
- Years active: 1983-present

Jeffrey J. Haboush is an American sound engineer. He has been nominated for four Academy Awards in the category Best Sound Mixing. He has worked on more than 150 films since 1983. He won a Daytime Emmy Award in 1989 for Outstanding Film Sound Mixing in his work on Muppet Babies.

== Selected filmography ==
- Spider-Man 2 (2004)
- Salt (2010)
- Transformers: Dark of the Moon (2011)
- 13 Hours: The Secret Soldiers of Benghazi (2016)
