= Spider-Man 2 =

2004 film by Sam Raimi

- Theatrical release poster
- Directed by: Sam Raimi
- Screenplay by: Alvin Sargent
- Story by: Alfred Gough; Miles Millar; Michael Chabon
- Based on: Spider-Man by: Stan Lee; Steve Ditko
- Produced by: Laura Ziskin; Avi Arad
- Starring: Tobey Maguire; Kirsten Dunst; James Franco; Alfred Molina; Rosemary Harris; Donna Murphy
- Cinematography: Bill Pope
- Edited by: Bob Murawski
- Music by: Danny Elfman
- Production companies: Columbia Pictures; Marvel Enterprises; Laura Ziskin Productions
- Distributed by: Sony Pictures Releasing
- Release dates: June 25, 2004 (Mann Village Theater); June 30, 2004 (United States)
- Running time: 127 minutes
- Country: United States
- Language: English
- Budget: $180 million
- Box office: $797 million

Spider-Man 2 is a 2004 American superhero film directed by Sam Raimi and written by Alvin Sargent from a story conceived by Michael Chabon and the writing team of Alfred Gough and Miles Millar. Based on the Marvel Comics superhero Spider-Man, it is the second film in Raimi's Spider-Man trilogy (2002–2007), and the sequel to Spider-Man (2002). Tobey Maguire stars as Peter Parker / Spider-Man, alongside Kirsten Dunst, James Franco, Alfred Molina, Rosemary Harris, and Donna Murphy. The plot follows Peter Parker as he tries to manage his job, academics, personal life, and life as Spider-Man while also attempting to stop the scientist Dr. Otto Octavius from re-creating a dangerous experiment.

Principal photography began in April 2003 in New York City and also took place in Los Angeles. Reshoots took place later that year and concluded in February 2004. Danny Elfman returned to compose the score. Spider-Man 2 premiered at the Fox Westwood Village Theater in Los Angeles on June 25, 2004, and was released in both conventional and IMAX theaters on June 30. It received acclaim from critics, who praised its emotional weight and visual effects, the performances of Maguire and Molina, and Raimi's direction. The film grossed $797 million worldwide, making it the third-highest-grossing film of 2004. It was selected by the American Film Institute as one of the top ten films of 2004.

Spider-Man 2 won Best Visual Effects at the 77th Academy Awards, and was also nominated for Best Sound Mixing and Best Sound Editing. It received five Saturn Awards, including Best Fantasy Film and Best Director. Its success led to the production of Spider-Man 3 (2007). Maguire and Molina reprised their roles from Spider-Man 2 in the Marvel Cinematic Universe (MCU) film Spider-Man: No Way Home (2021), which uses the concept of the multiverse to connect earlier Spider-Man films to the MCU.

== Plot ==
Peter Parker struggles to balance his personal life with his crime-fighting as Spider-Man. He juggles multiple jobs and faces overdue rent and schoolwork as his aunt May is facing eviction. Daily Bugle editor-in-chief J. Jonah Jameson criticizes Spider-Man in the paper, and Peter's best friend, Harry Osborn, blames Spider-Man for his father Norman Osborn's death, (Note: As depicted in Spider-Man (2002).) and resents Peter for not revealing Spider-Man's identity. To protect her, Peter has distanced himself from Mary Jane Watson, despite their mutual romantic feelings. Tired of Peter's secrecy, Mary Jane gets engaged to Jameson's son, John.

Now a leader at his father's company, Oscorp, Harry funds the development of a fusion power machine created by nuclear scientist Otto Octavius, who befriends and mentors Peter. During a public demonstration hosted by him and his wife Rosie, Octavius uses a harness with four mechanical tentacles controlled by artificial intelligence to interact with the machine. The fusion reaction destabilizes, threatening mass destruction and killing Rosie, but Octavius refuses to shut it down. The harness becomes fused to his body, and the inhibitor chip restricting the tentacles' AI is destroyed. Octavius is taken to a hospital where doctors prepare to surgically remove the harness, but the tentacles, having gained sapience without the inhibitor chip, kill the crew. Octavius, now under the tentacles' influence, flees to a derelict harbor warehouse, where he plans to rebuild the machine. While robbing a bank to fund his plan, Octavius takes May hostage, but Peter rescues her.

Overwhelmed by stress, exhaustion, and the conflict between wanting a normal life and his responsibilities as Spider-Man, Peter's powers begin to fade. He gives up being Spider-Man and embraces civilian life, excelling at university and watching Mary Jane perform in The Importance of Being Earnest. Peter confesses his inadvertent role in Ben's death to May; though initially shocked, she forgives him. Despite his lost powers, Peter saves a child from a burning building, but another person dies. Believing he could have saved them both as Spider-Man, Peter concludes that his responsibilities as Spider-Man outweigh his personal happiness.

Octavius completes his new machine and confronts Harry, demanding the rare isotope tritium to power it. Harry agrees in exchange for Octavius bringing him Spider-Man, instructing Octavius to use Peter to find him. Realizing that she does not love John, Mary Jane meets with Peter at a café to confess her feelings, but he lies that he does not reciprocate. Octavius attacks the pair and kidnaps Mary Jane to coerce Peter into finding Spider-Man. Peter's powers fully return, and as Spider-Man, he fights Octavius atop a New York City Subway train. Octavius sabotages the controls of the train before retreating, forcing Peter to use all his strength to stop it from plunging into the New York Harbor. Despite the passengers' efforts to protect him, Octavius captures the weakened Peter and delivers him to Harry.

Harry unmasks Spider-Man, discovering Peter's true identity. Peter persuades Harry to help him save Mary Jane, leading him to Octavius's lair. The larger fusion reaction destabilizes again, and Peter unmasks himself to convince Octavius to resist the tentacles' influence and help him. Octavius, acknowledging his folly, sacrifices himself to drown the machine in the bay. Peter rescues Mary Jane, who now knows his secret, and admits that while he loves her, he cannot be with her. Meanwhile, Harry sees a vision in a mirror of Norman demanding vengeance. Harry refuses to hurt Peter and shatters the mirror, revealing a storeroom of Norman's abandoned Green Goblin equipment.

On her wedding day, Mary Jane abandons the ceremony and runs to Peter's apartment, telling him her choice to be with him despite the risk. Their kiss is interrupted by police sirens, and Mary Jane encourages him to go help as Spider-Man.

== Cast ==
- Tobey Maguire as Peter Parker / Spider-Man:
  A superhero, Columbia University physics student, and photographer for the Daily Bugle. Juggling these separate lives means he briefly gives up his responsibilities as a superhero in a moment of adversity.
- Kirsten Dunst as Mary Jane Watson:
  An aspiring Broadway actress and a friend Peter has loved since he was a child, yet he gave up the chance of being with her out of concern for her safety. Still harboring feelings for Peter, Mary Jane begins dating John Jameson and eventually becomes engaged to him. She is also infatuated with Spider-Man, who saved her life numerous times in the past, and is initially unaware that the hero and Peter are the same.
- James Franco as Harry Osborn:
  Oscorp's current Chief executive officer (CEO), Norman Osborn's son and Peter's best friend, who holds his alter-ego Spider-Man responsible for his father's death. He is also Mary Jane's ex-boyfriend and still harbors feelings for her.
- Alfred Molina as Dr. Otto Octavius / Doctor Octopus:
  A scientist working on behalf of Oscorp and Peter's role model and mentor who goes insane after he fails to create a self-sustaining fusion reaction, which also resulted in the death of his wife, Rosie. Octavius is bonded with his handling equipment, four artificially intelligent mechanical tentacles, which influence his mentality and convince him that he must finish his experiment at all costs.
- Rosemary Harris as May Parker: Ben Parker's widow and Peter's paternal aunt.
- Donna Murphy as Rosalie Octavius: Otto's wife and assistant.

J. K. Simmons reprises his role as J. Jonah Jameson, the miserly manager and editor-in-chief of the Daily Bugle, while Daniel Gillies portrays his son John Jameson, an astronaut and Mary Jane's fiancé. Christine Estabrook appears briefly as Jameson's wife and John's mother.

As with the previous film, Bruce Campbell has a cameo appearance, this time as an usher who refuses Peter entry for arriving late to Mary Jane Watson's show. Spider-Man co-creator Stan Lee portrays a man on the street who saves a woman from falling debris during a battle between Spider-Man and Doctor Octopus. Dylan Baker portrays Dr. Curt Connors, one of Peter's college physics professors and a colleague of Octavius, while Willem Dafoe reprises his role as Norman Osborn, Harry's deceased father who appears to him as a hallucination. Dafoe came up with the idea during promotion for Spider-Man, which he compared to King Hamlet haunting his son to avenge him. Elizabeth Banks, John Paxton, Ted Raimi and Bill Nunn reprise their roles as Betty Brant, Osborn family butler Bernard Houseman, Ted Hoffman, and Robbie Robertson, respectively. Elya Baskin portrays Mr. Ditkovitch, Peter's landlord, (whose name is a reference to Spider-Man co-creator Steve Ditko) and Mageina Tovah plays his daughter Ursula. Cliff Robertson reprises his role as Peter's uncle Ben Parker in a dream sequence.

Scott Spiegel portrays a man who attempts to eat some pizza Spider-Man is delivering, only to have it webbed from his hands. Elyse Dinh portrays a violinist. Joel McHale portrays Mr. Jacks, a bank teller. Hal Sparks portrays an elevator passenger who has a conversation with Spider-Man. Donnell Rawlings portrays the New Yorker who exclaims that Spider-Man "stole that guy's pizzas" and Emily Deschanel portrays a receptionist. Brent Briscoe plays the garbage man who finds Spider-Man's costume in the trash and gives it to Jameson. Peter McRobbie plays an OsCorp representative. Reed Diamond plays Algernon. Daniel Dae Kim plays Raymond, an assistant of Otto Octavius working in his laboratory. Aasif Mandvi portrays Rahi Aziz, the owner of Joe's Pizza. Joey Diaz, Dan Hicks and Chloe Dykstra portray train passengers. Vanessa Ferlito portrays Louise, one of Mary Jane's co-stars. Joy Bryant appears as a spectator who witnesses Spider-Man in action. John Landis plays one of the doctors who operate on Doctor Octopus. Phil LaMarr portrays a train passenger who is most easily seen to the left of Spider-Man (the viewer's right) while the hero uses webbing to slow the train down. Gregg Edelman portrays Dr. Davis. Twin actors Peyton and Spencer List were to make their film debuts as a little girl and boy playing on steps but their scene was cut from the film.

== Production ==
=== Development ===
Immediately after finishing Spider-Man (2002), director Sam Raimi signed on to direct a sequel. In April 2002, Sony hired Smallville (2001–2011) alumni, Alfred Gough and Miles Millar to write a script for the film, as Raimi, producer Laura Ziskin and star Tobey Maguire enjoyed Smallville. On May 8, 2002, following Spider-Man's record-breaking $115 million opening weekend, Sony Pictures announced a sequel for 2004. Entitled The Amazing Spider-Man, after the character's main comic book title, the film was given a budget of $200 million and aimed for a release date of May 7, 2004. The following month, David Koepp was added to co-write with Gough and Millar. Koepp originally wanted to do the Gwen Stacy and Harry Osborn story and have Gwen to be killed in the middle of the second movie. The film's title The Amazing Spider-Man was a placeholder title, and other titles were proposed, such as Spider-Man 2 Lives, Spider-Man Unmasked, and Spider-Man: No More.

In September 2002, Michael Chabon was hired to rewrite. His draft had a younger Doc Ock, who becomes infatuated with Mary Jane Watson. His mechanical limbs use endorphins to counteract the pain of being attached to his body, which he enjoys. When he injures two muggers on a date, this horrifies Mary Jane, and in the resulting battle with Peter Parker / Spider-Man, his tentacles are fused, and the fusion begins to kill him. In the script, Octavius is the creator of the genetically altered spider from the first film, and gives Peter an antidote to remove his powers: this means when Octavius is dying with his tentacles, he wants to extract Spider-Man's spine to save himself. This leads to an alliance with Harry (a detail which made it into the finished film). Beforehand, Harry and the Daily Bugle put a $10 million price on Spider-Man's head, causing the city's citizens to turn against him. Chabon turned in his script to Sony but no one agreed with his take.

Raimi sifted through the previous drafts by Gough, Millar, Koepp and Chabon, picking what he liked with screenwriter Alvin Sargent. He felt that thematically the film had to explore Peter's conflict with his personal wants against his responsibility, exploring the positive and negatives of his chosen path, and how he ultimately decides that he can be happy as a heroic figure. Raimi took inspiration from Superman II (1980) for the story of Peter giving up his responsibilities. Although the story takes some partial influence from Doc Ock's debut in 1963 and the 1966 storyline If This Be My Destiny...!, the story was mostly inspired by the 1967 storyline Spider-Man No More!, specifically The Amazing Spider-Man #50. It was decided that Doctor Octopus would be kept as the villain, as he was both a visually interesting villain who was a physical match for Spider-Man, and a sympathetic figure with humanity, accompanied by the fact that the character had been repeatedly considered as a villain for the first film over the course of its 15-year development. Raimi changed much of the character's backstory, however, adding the idea of Octavius being a hero of Peter, and how their conflict was about trying to rescue him from his demons rather than kill him. Raimi confirmed Doctor Octopus as the film's antagonist in November 2002.

=== Casting ===
When Tobey Maguire signed on to portray Spider-Man in 2000, he was given a three-film contract. After filming Seabiscuit (2003) in late 2002, a pre-existing back condition that Maguire suffered from was bothering him. Raimi heard that Maguire could be paralyzed if there was an injury in his back. Jake Gyllenhaal was cast to replace Maguire; the two actors so resemble each other that "a source close to Maguire" reportedly said that, had Gyllenhaal taken over the role, "A year from now? The public wouldn't know the difference". Maguire's girlfriend's father Ronald Meyer—head of Universal Studios—helped Maguire regain the role, with a salary of $17 million. Maguire underwent tests to make sure if his back was fit for filming. Gyllenhaal would eventually play Quentin Beck / Mysterio in the Marvel Cinematic Universe (MCU) film Spider-Man: Far From Home (2019) and said in an interview around that time that he was one of several actors considered to replace Maguire. Raimi stated that before filming he was concerned that Maguire and Dunst weren't going to have the same chemistry, as they had since broken up.

Elizabeth Banks was announced to reprise her role as Betty Brant in January 2003. Several actors were considered for the part of Doctor Octopus, including Ed Harris, Chris Cooper (who went on to play as Norman Osborn in the 2014 film The Amazing Spider-Man 2), and Christopher Walken; Alfred Molina was cast as Otto Octavius in February 2003 and underwent physical training for the role. Molina initially signed a three-picture deal where it said that they have the right to renew the option. The reaction to his casting was mixed. Raimi had been impressed by his performance in Frida (2002) and also felt that his large physical size was true to the comic book character. Molina only briefly discussed the role and was not aware that he was a strong contender. He was a big fan of Marvel Comics and was excited to get the part. Although he was not familiar with Doc Ock, Molina found one element of the comics that he wanted to maintain, the character's cruel, sardonic sense of humor. Molina signed a three-film option with a contract that stated the producers could choose to renew it if they decided to bring him back, with producer Avi Arad assuring him that nobody really dies in the Marvel Universe when Molina told him and his fellow producers he assumed the option was null and void upon filming his character's death scene.

=== Filming ===
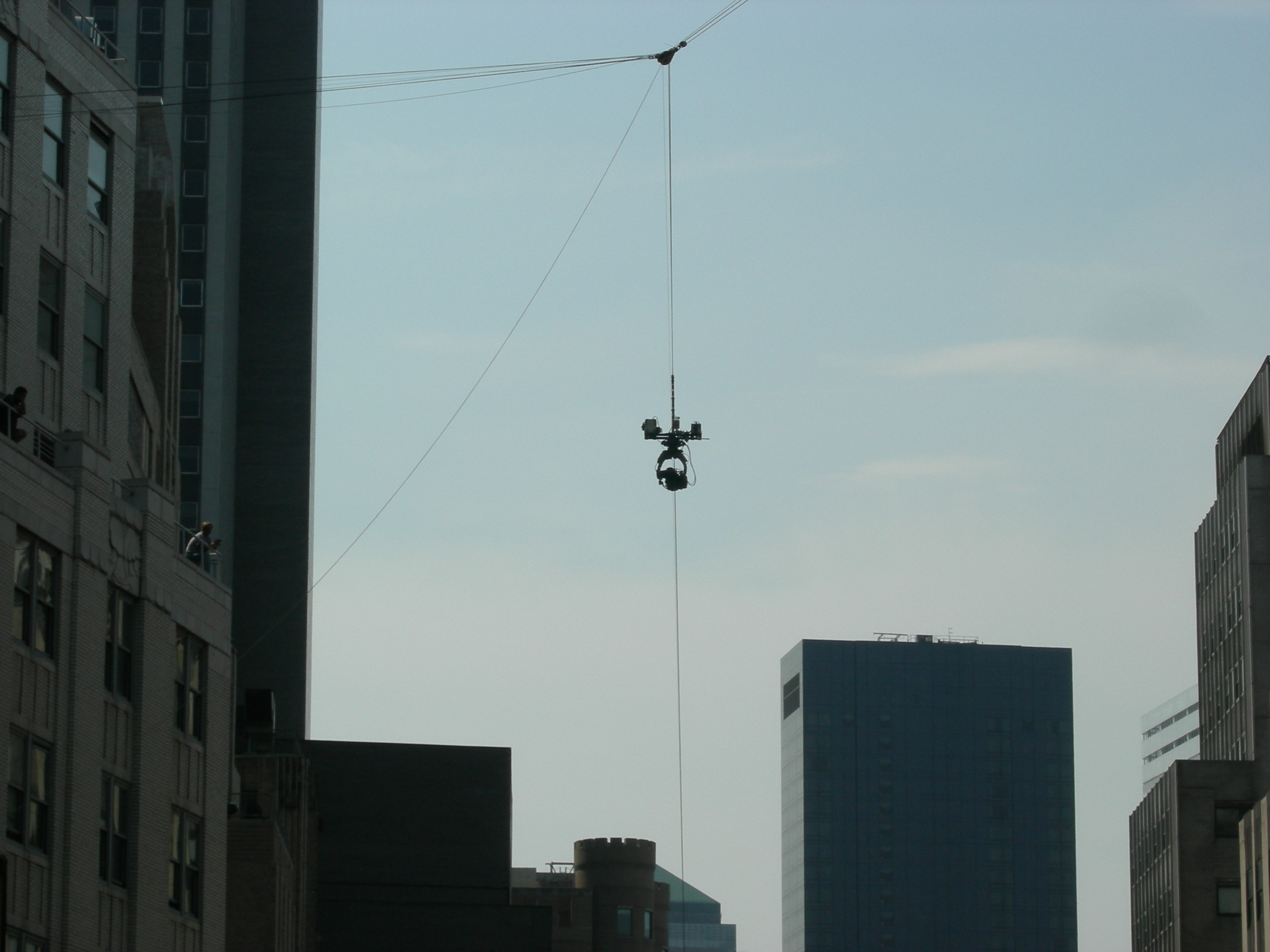
The Spydercam was used extensively in the film to "track stunt doubles and a computer-generated Spider-Man through the air".

Spider-Man 2 was shot on over one hundred sets and locations, beginning with a pre-shoot on the Loop in Chicago during two days in November 2002. The crew acquired a train of 2200 series cars, placing sixteen cameras for background shots of Spider-Man and Doc Ock's train fight. Members of the film's production team acknowledged that the surroundings of where the Chicago subway car was filmed do not correspond to the kinds of routes that present day New York City subway cars travel. Filming was originally slated to start in January 2003, but was pushed back to April so that Maguire could finish Seabiscuit. Principal photography began on April 12, 2003, in New York City and Chicago. The crew moved on May 13 to Los Angeles, shooting on sets created by production designer Neil Spisak. After the scare surrounding his back pains, Maguire relished performing many of his stunts, even creating a joke of it with Raimi, creating the line "My back, my back" as Spider-Man tries to regain his powers. Raimi said that while filming the scene he yelled at Maguire to get to the edge of the building, but Maguire refused to do it. Even Rosemary Harris took a turn, putting her stunt double out of work. In contrast, Molina joked that the stunt team would "trick" him into performing a stunt time and again. J. K. Simmons said that while filming the scene where Spider-Man gets his suit back from the Daily Bugle, when Simmons said "he's a thief," his fake teeth popped out of his mouth.

Filming was put on hiatus for eight weeks in order to build Doc Ock's pier lair. It had been Spisak's idea to use a collapsed pier as Ock's lair, reflecting an exploded version of the previous lab and representing how Octavius's life had collapsed and grown more monstrous, evoking the films of Fritz Lang and the movie The Cabinet of Dr. Caligari (1920). Filming then resumed on that set, having taken fifteen weeks to build, occupying Sony's Stage 30. It was 60 feet (18 m) by 120 feet (37 m) long, and 40 feet (12 m) high, and a quarter-scale miniature was also built for the finale as it collapses. Reshoots for the film wrapped in February 2004.

A camera system called the Spydercam was used to allow filmmakers to express more of Spider-Man's world view, at times dropping fifty stories and with shot lengths of just over 2,400 feet (730 m) in New York or 3,200 feet (980 m) in Los Angeles. For some shots, the camera would shoot at six frames per second for a faster playback, increasing the sense of speed. Shots using the Spydercam were pre-planned in digital versions of cities, and the camera's movement was controlled with motion control, making it highly cost-effective. The camera system was only used in the previous film for the final shot.

=== Visual effects ===
Although roughly the same as before, costume designer James Acheson made numerous subtle changes to Spider-Man's costume. Its colors were made richer and bolder, its spider emblem was given more elegant lines and enlarged, its eye-lenses were somewhat smaller, and its muscle suit underneath was made into pieces, to give a better sense of movement. The helmet Maguire wore under his mask was also improved, with better movement for the false jaw and magnetic eyepieces, which were easier to remove.

To create Doc Ock's mechanical tentacles, Steve Johnson's Edge FX was hired to create a corset, a metal and rubber girdle, a rubber spine and four foam rubber tentacles which were 8 feet (2.4 m) long and altogether weighed 100 pounds (45 kg). The claws of each tentacle, which were called "death flowers", were controlled by one puppeteer sitting on a chair. Each tentacle was controlled by four people, who rehearsed every scene with Molina so that they could give a natural sense of movement as if the tentacles were moving due to Octavius's muscle movement. On set, Molina referred to his tentacles as "Larry", "Harry", "Moe" and "Flo", with "Flo" being the top-right tentacle as it was operated by a female grip, and performed delicate operations like removing his glasses and lighting his cigar.

Edge FX was only hired to do scenes where Octavius carries his tentacles. CGI was used for when the tentacles carry Octavius: a 20 ft (6.1 m) high rig held Molina to glide through his surroundings, with CGI tentacles added in post-production. The CGI versions were scanned straight from the real ones to allow them to appear more realistic. However, using the real versions was always preferred to save money, and each scene was always filmed first with Edge FX's creations to see if CGI was truly necessary. In some shots where CGI is used, Molina is replaced by a virtual actor possessing the CGI tentacles. Through the use of motion-capture and cyber-scanning, visual effects supervisor Scott Stokdyk and CGI character animation supervisor Anthony LaMolinara were able to create more detailed virtual actors to replace Maguire and Molina in some shots, as well as make them display natural human motion. Completing the illusion, the sound designers chose not to use servo sound effects, feeling it would rob the tentacles of the sense that they were part of Octavius's body, and instead used motorcycle chains and piano wires.

As with the previous film, John Dykstra served as visual effects designer. Dykstra and his crew sought to make the weakest shot of the second movie look as good as the best shot of the first movie. Dykstra not only created the physical appearance of Octavius's tentacles, but also that of the nuclear reaction that Octavius attempts to carry out in the film. The reaction resembles the sun, complete with solar flares, and poses a threat to its immediate environment through its strong gravitational pull, which can draw surrounding objects directly into it and disintegrate them. As mentioned previously, the film's increased budget allowed the reaction to have a significant amount of artistry and reality.

== Music ==
The film was scored by Danny Elfman, composer of the previous film. However, during recording sessions, Elfman had a falling out with Raimi, and would later say that composing Spider-Man 2 was a "miserable experience". Christopher Young (who later scored Spider-Man 3), Joseph LoDuca, and John Debney did additional scores for the film. Elfman was asked to score a cue from Hellraiser (1987), but he could not get close to it and refused to imitate Young. Instead, he suggested hiring Young, but Young also could not get it close, so the cue was licensed from Hellraiser instead. It can be heard during the reveal of Doctor Octopus's tentacles.

Elfman and Raimi would eventually mend their creative relationship in 2012 and collaborate once again on Oz the Great and Powerful (2013).

== Release ==
=== Marketing ===
In December 2003, the first teaser trailer for Spider-Man 2 was released with screenings of The Lord of the Rings: The Return of the King. A second trailer, released in April 2004, was shown during the television series The Apprentice (2004–2017) and in theaters with screenings of The Alamo. Promotional partners in the film's marketing campaign included Burger King, Dr Pepper, Kraft Foods, Major League Baseball, Kellogg's, and Embassy Suites Hotels.

== Box office ==
Spider-Man 2 grossed $375.8 million in the United States and Canada and $421.2 million in other territories for a total worldwide gross of $797 million, against a production budget of $200 million.

Spider-Man 2 opened in the United States on June 30, 2004, and grossed $40.4 million in its first day; this broke its predecessor's opening day record of $39.4 million until it was surpassed a year later by Star Wars: Episode III – Revenge of the Sith ($50.0 million). Playing at 4,152 theaters upon opening, it had the second-highest number of screenings of any film, behind Shrek 2. The film also broke The Lord of the Rings: The Return of the King's record ($34.5 million) for the highest-grossing Wednesday of all time. It held the Wednesday record for three years until it was topped by Harry Potter and the Order of the Phoenix ($44.2 million). Its Friday-to-Sunday gross reached a total of $88.2 million, surpassing Austin Powers in Goldmember ($73.1 million) to have the largest July opening weekend. Moreover, Spider-Man 2 also beat Men in Black II ($52.1 million) for having the biggest Fourth of July opening weekend at the time. The film held the record until 2011 when it was broken by Transformers: Dark of the Moon ($97.9 million). With a total gross of $152.6 million, it surpassed Shrek 2 ($129 million) to have the highest five-day Wednesday opening. In its first six days, the film had grossed over $180 million, which surpassed the previous largest six-day opening record held by The Matrix Reloaded ($146.9 million). Additionally, it had the highest Monday gross of any film, generating a total of $27.6 million. The film would hold this record for a decade until it was eclipsed by Star Wars: The Force Awakens ($40.1 million) in 2015. Spider-Man 2 became the quickest film to hit the $200 million mark, taking eight days to do so. This record would be tied with Revenge of the Sith and Pirates of the Caribbean: Dead Man's Chest. All three films were surpassed by The Dark Knight in 2008.

Internationally, Spider-Man 2 opened in 28 territories and grossed $43 million in its first week. The film set opening records in Brazil, generating $3.1 million on 650 prints, claiming 62% of market share, and beating its predecessor's opening weekend by 22%. It took in $6.6 million on 873 prints in Mexico, which was ranked as the country's third-largest opening, coming in at 10% less than the original. Spider-Man 2 produced $1.3 million in Malaysia, smashing Godzilla's record for having the biggest movie opening in the country. In Indonesia, it was the first film in the country's history to reach $2.3 million, surpassing the previous record held by Titanic. In total, the international grosses include Australia ($17.8 million), France ($40.2 million), Germany ($24.2 million), Italy ($24.4 million), Japan ($59.5 million), Mexico ($20.5 million), South Korea ($13 million), Spain ($18.8 million), and the United Kingdom ($49.7 million).

== Reception ==
=== Critical response ===
Spider-Man 2 received critical acclaim upon release. On the review aggregator website Rotten Tomatoes, Spider-Man 2 holds an approval rating of 93% based on 276 reviews, with an average score of 8.3/10. The website's critical consensus reads, "Boasting an entertaining villain and deeper emotional focus, Spider-Man 2 is a nimble sequel that improves upon the original." Metacritic, which uses a weighted average, gives the film a score of 83 out of 100 based on 41 reviews, indicating "universal acclaim". Audiences polled by CinemaScore gave the film an average grade of "A−" on an A+ to F scale, the same grade earned by the previous film.

Chicago Tribune gave the film three and a half stars out of four, and Mark Caro stated that Alfred Molina was a "pleasingly complex" villain, and the film as a whole "improves upon its predecessor in almost every way." William Arnold, of the Seattle Post-Intelligencer gave it a positive review, saying, "Forget Raising Helen and The Notebook, this is the movie summer's most touching young romance." Kenneth Turan, of the Los Angeles Times, gave the film four stars out of five and concurred with Caro when he stated, "Doc Ock grabs this film with his quartet of sinisterly serpentine mechanical arms and refuses to let go." Roger Ebert gave Spider-Man 2 four stars out of four, calling it "the best superhero movie since the modern genre was launched with Superman (1978)", and praising the film for "effortlessly [combining] special effects and a human story, keeping its parallel plots alive and moving." He later called it the fourth best film of 2004.

Joe Baltake of The Sacramento Bee gave the film his highest possible score, calling it "the closest thing to an art-house action film since Tim Burton's original Batman in 1989." IGN's Richard George felt "Sam Raimi and his writing team delivered an iconic, compelling version of Spider-Man's classic foe... We almost wish there was a way to retroactively add some of these elements to the original character." In 2016, James Charisma of Playboy ranked the film #9 on a list of "15 Sequels That Are Way Better Than The Originals". Conversely, J. Hoberman, of The Village Voice, thought the first half of the film was "talky bordering on tiresome", with the film often stopping to showcase Raimi's idea of humor. Peter Bradshaw of The Guardian gave it 3 out of 5 stars, writing, "In between the combat scenes it gets a little dull and I've never found the seething resentment of Peter's friend Harry Osborn ... particularly interesting. Doc Ock's much better value."

The cast's performances were widely acclaimed. Ebert, who had panned the first film yet praised Maguire's performance, reciprocated his praise, writing, "if Maguire hadn't returned (along with Spidey's throwaway line about his aching back), we would never have known how good he could be in this role." He also wrote that Dunst "[brought] depth and heart to a girlfriend role that in lesser movies would be conventional. When she kisses her astronaut boyfriend upside-down, it's one of those perfect moments that rewards fans of the whole saga; we don't need to be told she's remembering her only kiss from Spider-Man." Concerning Molina's performance, ABC News wrote, "Molina is one of the summer's greatest scene-stealers — and now, instantly recognizable. How long can you play an eight-limbed monster and a Broadway fiddler before audiences get distracted?... The answer: So far, so good. Playing to packed houses, Molina can apparently fiddle on the finest roofs on Broadway without the extra metal limbs getting in the way. They may even help." (Note: At the time the film was released, Molina was playing Tevye in Fiddler on the Roof on Broadway.) in a 5-star review, Josh Wilding of ComicBookMovie.com added, "[Molina] is excellent, and Doc Ock is an unhinged, terrific bad guy who serves as an undeniably worthy follow-up to Willem Dafoe's memorable Green Goblin," in addition to praising Danny Elfman's score and the visual effects.

== Legacy ==
In 2022, Rolling Stone ranked Spider-Man 2 as the second-best superhero film of all time, behind Black Panther (2018). Rotten Tomatoes ranked it number 15 on a list of the top 100 superhero films, and ranked it 31st on its list of Essential 2000s Movies. The film was placed 411th on Empire magazine's top 500 movies list, describing the film as "Bigger and better than its predecessor, with a superior villain in Alfred Molina's Doc Ock, and a more confident Raimi sneaking in some of his own trademarks." In 2018, Film School Rejects called it "the best summer movie ever" and said that its "emotional and calculated story stands above modern summer flicks" like those of The Avengers and The Dark Knight. Writing for The Independent in 2019, Al Horner believed the film to be "the definitive superhero movie" that "laid the blueprint for the entire modern superhero genre". Digital Trends' David Caballero named Spider-Man 2 the best superhero movie of all time for its 20th anniversary in 2024. In 2026, IndieWire ranked it 21st on list of 100 Best Movie Sequels.

== Accolades ==
At the 77th Academy Awards, Spider-Man 2 won Best Visual Effects (John Dykstra, Scott Stokdyk, Anthony LaMolinara and John Frazier), and was nominated for Best Sound Mixing (Kevin O'Connell, Greg P. Russell, Jeffrey J. Haboush and Joseph Geisinger) and Best Sound Editing, but lost to Ray and The Incredibles, respectively. The film won Saturn Awards for Best Actor, Best Director, Best Fantasy Film, Best Special Effects, and Best Writer, while being nominated for Best Supporting Actor and Best Music. It was nominated for two British Academy Film Awards for Special Visual Effects and Sound, but lost to The Day After Tomorrow and Ray, respectively. The American Film Institute (AFI) listed the film as one of the 2004's ten best films, and in 2007 nominated the film for its updated list of the 100 greatest American films.

Award	Date of ceremony	Category	Recipients	Result
Academy Awards	February 27, 2005	Best Sound Editing	Paul N.J. Ottosson	Nominated
Academy Awards	February 27, 2005	Best Sound Mixing	Kevin O'Connell, Greg P. Russell, Jeffrey J. Haboush and Joseph Geisinger	Nominated
Academy Awards	February 27, 2005	Best Visual Effects	John Dykstra, Scott Stokdyk, Anthony LaMolinara and John Frazier	Won
American Film Institute Awards	2005	Movie of the Year	Spider-Man 2	Won
BMI Film and TV Awards	May 18, 2005	BMI Film Music Award	Danny Elfman	Won
British Academy Film Awards	February 12, 2005	Best Achievement in Special Visual Effects	John Dykstra, Scott Stokdyk, Anthony LaMolinara, and John Frazier	Nominated
British Academy Film Awards	February 12, 2005	BAFTA Award for Best Sound	Paul N.J. Ottosson, Kevin O'Connell, Greg P. Russell, and Jeffrey J. Haboush	Nominated
Broadcast Film Critics Association Awards	January 10, 2005	Best Family Film	Spider-Man 2	Nominated
Broadcast Film Critics Association Awards	January 10, 2005	Best Popular Movie	Spider-Man 2	Won
Cinema Audio Society Awards	February 19, 2005	Outstanding Achievement in Sound Mixing for Motion Pictures	Joseph Geisinger, Kevin O'Connell, Greg P. Russell, and Jeffrey J. Haboush	Nominated
Empire Awards	March 13, 2005	Best Film	Spider-Man 2	Nominated
Empire Awards	March 13, 2005	Best Actor	Tobey Maguire	Nominated
Empire Awards	March 13, 2005	Best Actress	Kirsten Dunst	Nominated
Empire Awards	March 13, 2005	Sony Ericsson Scene of the Year	Spider-Man 2	Nominated
Empire Awards	March 13, 2005	Best Director	Sam Raimi	Won
Golden Trailer Awards	May 25, 2004	Summer 2004 Blockbuster	Spider-Man 2	Nominated
Golden Trailer Awards	May 25, 2004	Best of Show	Spider-Man 2	Nominated
Hugo Awards	August 7, 2005	Best Dramatic Presentation – Long Form	Spider-Man 2	Nominated
London Critics Circle Film Awards	February 9, 2005	British Supporting Actor of the Year	Alfred Molina	Nominated
MTV Movie Awards	June 4, 2005	Best Action Sequence	Spider-Man 2	Nominated
MTV Movie Awards	June 4, 2005	Best Movie	Spider-Man 2	Nominated
MTV Movie Awards	June 4, 2005	Best Villain	Alfred Molina	Nominated
People's Choice Awards	January 9, 2005	Favorite Motion Picture	Spider-Man 2	Nominated
People's Choice Awards	January 9, 2005	Favorite On-Screen Match-up	Kirsten Dunst and Tobey Maguire	Nominated
People's Choice Awards	January 9, 2005	Favorite Sequel	Spider-Man 2	Nominated
Satellite Awards	December 17, 2005	Best Actor in a Supporting Role, Drama	Alfred Molina	Nominated
Satellite Awards	December 17, 2005	Best Cinematography	Bill Pope and Anette Haellmigk	Nominated
Satellite Awards	December 17, 2005	Best Film Editing	Bob Murawski	Nominated
Satellite Awards	December 17, 2005	Best Original Score	Danny Elfman	Nominated
Satellite Awards	December 17, 2005	Best Sound (Editing & Mixing)	Kevin O'Connell, Greg P. Russell, Jeffrey J. Haboush, Joseph Geisinger, Paul N.J. Ottosson, and Susan Dudeck	Nominated
Satellite Awards	December 17, 2005	Best Visual Effects	John Dykstra, Scott Stokdyk, Anthony LaMolinara, and John Frazier	Nominated
Saturn Awards	May 3, 2005	Best Fantasy Film	Spider-Man 2	Won
Saturn Awards	May 3, 2005	Best Actor	Tobey Maguire	Won
Saturn Awards	May 3, 2005	Best Supporting Actor	Alfred Molina	Nominated
Saturn Awards	May 3, 2005	Best Director	Sam Raimi	Won
Saturn Awards	May 3, 2005	Best Writer	Alvin Sargent	Won
Saturn Awards	May 3, 2005	Best Music	Danny Elfman	Nominated
Saturn Awards	May 3, 2005	Best Special Effects	John Dykstra, Scott Stokdyk, Anthony LaMolinara and John Frazier	Won
Saturn Awards	May 3, 2005	Best Overall DVD	Spider-Man 2	Won
Visual Effects Society Award	February 16, 2005	Best Single Visual Effect of the Year	John Dykstra, Lydia Bottegoni, Dan Abrams, and John Monos	Nominated
Visual Effects Society Award	February 16, 2005	Outstanding Compositing in a Motion Picture	Colin Drobnis, Greg Derochie, Blaine Kennison, and Ken Lam	Won
Visual Effects Society Award	February 16, 2005	Outstanding Created Environment in a Live Act on Motion Picture	Dan Abrams, David Emery, Andrew Nawrot, and John Hart	Won
Visual Effects Society Award	February 16, 2005	Outstanding Performance by an Actor or Actress in a Visual Effects Film	Alfred Molina	Won
Visual Effects Society Award	February 16, 2005	Outstanding Special Effects in Service to Visual Effects in a Motion Picture	John Frazier, James D. Schwalm, James Nagle, and David Amborn	Nominated
Visual Effects Society Award	February 16, 2005	Outstanding Visual Effects in a Visual Effects Driven Motion Picture	John Dykstra, Lydia Bottegoni, Anthony LaMolinara, and Scott Stokdyk	Nominated
World Stunt Awards	September 25, 2005	Best Overall Stunt by a Stunt Man	Chris Daniels and Michael Hugghins	Won
World Stunt Awards	September 25, 2005	Best Specialty Stunt	Tim Storms, Garrett Warren, Susie Park, Patricia M. Peters, Norb Phillips, Lisa Hoyle, Kevin L. Jackson, and Clay Donahue Fontenot	Nominated
World Stunt Awards	September 25, 2005	Best Work with a Vehicle	Tad Griffith, Richard Burden, Scott Rogers, Darrin Prescott, and Mark Norby	Nominated

== Post-release ==
=== Home media ===
The film was initially released on DVD and VHS on November 30, 2004, in the United States, in Australia on November 17, and in the UK and Ireland on November 26. The DVD was available in both anamorphic widescreen and pan-and-scan "fullscreen", as well as a Superbit edition and in a box-set with the first film. The film was also the first Sony Pictures movie released in the United States under the Sony Pictures Home Entertainment banner, and one of the final major titles released outside of North America under the Columbia TriStar Home Entertainment name. The film was also released in some territories in a DVD boxset with the first film. There was also a collector's DVD gift set including a reprint of The Amazing Spider-Man #50. For the DVD release, this two-disc set features numerous bonus features, including audio commentaries, behind-the-scenes featurettes, a trivia track with facts displayed throughout the movie, traiĺers for Hitch and other films, a music video, Web-i-sodes, galleries and bloopers. The DVD release sold 11,604,597 units and grossed $174,260,344 in the United States. The film was also released on Sony's proprietary Universal Media Disc (UMD) format in 2005, with 1 million UMD copies of the film sold in the United States as part of a PlayStation Portable (PSP) bundle. The film received a novelization written by Peter David. The film was released on Blu-ray in October 2007 as a part of the Spider-Man: The High Definition Trilogy box set. All three films were re-released on Blu-ray as part of the Spider-Man: Origins set in 2017. Raimi's Spider-Man trilogy was released on Disney+ on April 21, 2023.

=== Spider-Man 2.1 (2007) ===
An extended cut of the film, entitled Spider-Man 2.1, was released on DVD on April 17, 2007. The cut included eight minutes of new footage, with new special features not included in the original release, as well as a sneak preview of the then-upcoming Spider-Man 3. The cut also featured new, alternate, and extended scenes, and a featurette: "Inside Spider-Man 2.1", detailing the making of the cut. A similar cut aired on January 2, 2007, on the FX channel with an exclusive sneak preview for Spider-Man 3.

=== Sequels ===
In March 2004, three months before Spider-Man 2's release, Sony announced that a sequel was already in development. Spider-Man 3 was released on May 4, 2007.

In 2021, Molina was announced to return as Doctor Octopus in Spider-Man: No Way Home (2021), which is part of the Marvel Cinematic Universe and directed by Jon Watts. Molina later clarified in April that the character would be the same iteration as depicted in Spider-Man 2 and his story arc would continue directly from the film's ending.

=== Re-releases ===
In March 2024, Sony announced that all of its live-action Spider-Man films would be re-released in theaters as part of Columbia Pictures' 100th anniversary celebration. Spider-Man 2 was re-released on April 22, 2024.

In June 2025, it was announced that Sony, in collaboration with Fathom Events, would be re-releasing the Sam Raimi Spider-Man trilogy in theaters. This also marks the first theatrical release of the film's extended cut, Spider-Man 2.1, which was re-released on September 27, 2025, and was then followed by an encore screening on October 4, 2025.

=== Video game ===
To coincide with the film's release, a video game of the same name was released for the Game Boy Advance, GameCube, Microsoft Windows, PlayStation 2 and Xbox on June 28, 2004. Releases on the PlayStation Portable, N-Gage, and Nintendo DS systems would follow. An action-adventure video game, it serves as a sequel to the Spider-Man: The Movie (2002). Published by Activision, the console versions were developed by Treyarch, but the other versions had different developers. The console and handheld versions of Spider-Man 2 were well received, except the PC/Mac version. Upon launch, the game had shipped more than 2 million units in North America by July 7, 2004.
