= Joseph Geisinger =

American sound engineer

- Occupation: Sound engineer
- Years active: 1980–present

Joseph Geisinger is an American sound engineer. He was nominated for an Academy Award in the category Best Sound Mixing for the film Spider-Man 2. He has worked on over 50 films since 1980.

== Selected filmography ==
- Spider-Man 2 (2004)
