= Anthony LaMolinara =

American film director

- Born: Italy
- Occupations: Film director; Film producer; Visual effects artist
- Years active: 1991-present

Anthony LaMolinara is an American film director, producer and special effects artist.

== Oscar history ==
LaMolinara has won the Academy Award for Best Visual Effects once, with one other nomination. Both of the following are in this category:

- 75th Academy Awards - Nominated for Spider-Man. Nomination shared with John Dykstra, John Frazier and Scott Stokdyk. Lost to The Lord of the Rings: The Two Towers.
- 77th Academy Awards - Spider-Man 2, award shared with John Dykstra, John Frazier and Scott Stokdyk. Won.

== Personal life ==
Anthony LaMolinara married Mariella Vodola in 2017 in Busto Arsizio; the ceremony was officiated by Manuela Maffioli.
