= Manuela Maffioli =

Italian politician (born 1971)

Honorable Manuela Maffioli
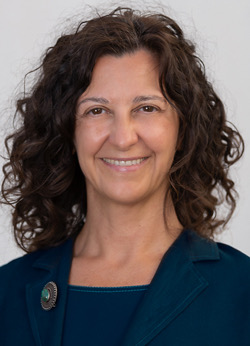
- Official portrait, 2026

Member of the Chamber of Deputies
- Incumbent
- Assumed office 25 March 2026
- Constituency: Lombardy

Deupty Mayor of Busto Arsizio
- In office 2019–2024
- Preceded by: Isabella Tovaglieri
- Succeeded by: Luca Folegani

Assessore for the Culture of Busto Arsizio
- Incumbent
- Assumed office 2017
- Preceded by: Paola Magugliani

Member of the City Council of Busto Arsizio
- In office 1993–1997

Personal details
- Born: 6 June 1971 (age 55) Busto Arsizio, Italy
- Party: Lega Nord
- Occupation: Politician

Manuela Maffioli (Busto Arsizio, 6 June 1971) is an Italian politician and journalist, and a member of the Chamber of Deputies since 2026, following the death of Umberto Bossi.

== Early life ==
Manuela Maffioli was born on 6 June 1971 in Busto Arsizio, Lombardy. She began her political career in the 1980s, joining the Lega Nord party. In 1993 she was elected as a member of Busto Arsizio's City Council, and served one term. Following this, she became a contributor to the local newspaper ‘La Prealpina’.

== Career ==
In 2017, Maffioli returned to politics and was appointed Councillor for Culture of Busto Arsizio, and from 2019 to 2024 served as deputy mayor of Busto Arsizio. In 2022 she ran for the Chamber of Deputies in the Lombardy 2 constituency, finishing second. Following the death of Umberto Bossi on 19 March 2026, she was appointed as his successor in the Chamber of Deputies. (Note: The seat was actually won by Matteo Luigi Bianchi, but as he declined it, the seat was given to Maffioli) She assumed office on 25 March 2026.On 2 April 2026, Maffioli was appointed member of the VII Commission (Culture, Science, and Education).
