= John Frazier =

American visual effects supervisor

- Born: September 23, 1944 (age 81); Chicago, Illinois

John Frazier (born September 23, 1944) is an American visual effects supervisor.

He was born in Chicago, Illinois.

He has 10 Oscar nominations, with one win for Spider-Man 2 at the 77th Academy Awards. He shared the award with John Dykstra, Scott Stokdyk and Anthony LaMolinara.

Academy Award Recognition
Year	Film	Shared with	Win
69th Academy Awards	Twister (1996)	Stefen Fangmeir, Habib Zargarpour. and Henry La Bounta	No
71st Academy Awards	Armageddon (1998)	Richard R. Hoover and Pat McClung	No
73rd Academy Awards	The Perfect Storm (2000)	Stefen Fangmeier, Habib Zargarpour, and Walt Conti	No
74th Academy Awards	Pearl Harbor (2001)	Eric Brevig, Ed Hirsch, and Ben Snow	No
75th Academy Awards	Spider-Man (2002)	John Dykstra, Scott Stokdyk and Anthony LaMolinara	No
77th Academy Awards	Spider-Man 2 (2004)	John Dykstra, Scott Stokdyk and Anthony LaMolinara	Yes
79th Academy Awards	Poseidon (2006)	Boyd Shermis, Kim Libreri, and Chas Jarrett	No
80th Academy Awards	Pirates of the Caribbean: At World's End (2007)	John Knoll, Hal Hickel and Charles Gibson	No
84th Academy Awards	Transformers: Dark of the Moon (2011)	Scott Farrar, Scott Benza, and Matthew Butler	No
86th Academy Awards	The Lone Ranger (2013)	Tim Alexander, Gary Brozenich, and Edson Williams	No
