= Scott Stokdyk =

American visual effects artist (born 1969)

- Born: October 16, 1969 (age 56)
- Occupation: Visual effects artist
- Years active: 1995-present

Scott Stokdyk (born October 16, 1969) is an American visual effects artist who is best known for his work on the films Spider-Man and Spider-Man 2.

== Oscar history ==
Stokdyk has won the Academy Award for Best Visual Effects once, with a further two nominations. All of the following are in this category:

- 73rd Academy Awards-Nominated for Hollow Man, nomination shared with Scott E. Anderson, Craig Hayes and Stan Parks. Lost to Gladiator.
- 75th Academy Awards-Nominated for Spider-Man. Nomination shared with John Dykstra, John Frazier and Anthony LaMolinara. Lost to The Lord of the Rings: The Two Towers.
- 77th Academy Awards-Spider-Man 2, award shared with John Dykstra, John Frazier and Anthony LaMolinara. Won.

== Selected filmography ==
- Broken Arrow (1996)
- The Fifth Element (1997)
- Titanic (1997)
- Godzilla (1998)
- Hollow Man (2000)
- Spider-Man (2002)
- Spider-Man 2 (2004)
- Spider-Man 3 (2007)
- G-Force (2009)
- Oz the Great and Powerful (2013)
- The Fantastic Four: First Steps (2025)
