= John Dykstra =

American filmmaker (born 1947)

- Born: John Charles Dykstra; June 3, 1947 (age 79); Long Beach, California, U.S.
- Education: California State University, Long Beach
- Occupation: Special effects artist
- Years active: 1971–present
- Spouse: Cass McCune (m. 1996)
- Children: Chloe Dykstra

John Charles Dykstra, A.S.C. (/ˈdaɪkstrə/; born June 3, 1947) is an American special effects artist, pioneer in the development of the use of computers in filmmaking and recipient of three Academy Awards, among many other awards and prizes. He was one of the original employees of Industrial Light & Magic, the special effects and computer graphics division of Lucasfilm. He is well known as the special effects lead on the original Star Wars, helping bring the original visuals for lightsabers, space battles between X-wings and TIE fighters, and Force powers to the screen. He also led special effects on many other movies, including Batman Forever, Batman & Robin, Caddyshack, Stuart Little, X-Men: First Class, Spider-Man and Spider-Man 2.

== Education and early career ==
Dykstra was born in Long Beach, California. After studying industrial design at California State University, Long Beach (where he was a member of Phi Kappa Tau fraternity), in 1971 he landed a job working with Douglas Trumbull on Silent Running filming model effects, when Trumbull hired recent college graduates due to the film's low budget.

== Star Wars ==
In 1975, when George Lucas was recruiting people for the special effects work on Star Wars, he approached Douglas Trumbull, but he was unavailable as he was about to start working on Steven Spielberg's Close Encounters of the Third Kind. Trumbull pointed Lucas towards Dykstra. Lucas formed his own special effects company, Industrial Light & Magic (ILM), based in warehouse premises in Van Nuys, and appointed Dykstra to supervise the new team, many of whom he worked with previously on Trumbull's "Silent Running." This led to the development of the Dykstraflex motion-controlled camera, which enabled many of the film's groundbreaking effects to be produced. The system was made possible by the availability of off-the-shelf integrated-circuit RAM at relatively low cost and secondhand VistaVision cameras.

However, tensions arose between Dykstra and Lucas, the latter complaining that too much time and money was spent on developing the digital camera systems and that the effects team did not deliver all the shots that he had wanted causing the production to run behind schedule. These tensions would reportedly culminate with Dykstra's dismissal from ILM following Lucas' return from principal photography in London. Regardless, following the release of Star Wars, Dykstra and his team won Academy Awards for best special effects and special technical achievement.

== Battlestar Galactica ==
After Star Wars, Dykstra began working on Battlestar Galactica for Universal Studios. Supervising the special effects for the three-hour pilot episode (which was also released theatrically), Dykstra formed his own effects company called Apogee, Inc. which included several ILM employees who had worked on Star Wars. Dykstra was also given a Producer credit for the pilot of the television series. As Universal then opted to make Galactica into a weekly series, many of Dykstra's effects shots were recycled and used repeatedly throughout the show's single season run.

After Galactica aired, Lucas and 20th Century Fox began legal proceedings against Universal claiming that they had plagiarized Star Wars, a matter not helped by the similar effects and design styles (artist Ralph McQuarrie had also contributed to Galactica). Lucas was also reportedly unhappy about Dykstra using the equipment (that had been developed and paid for from the Star Wars budget) on a production that was essentially a competitor. When Lucas relocated ILM to San Francisco from Van Nuys to commence work on The Empire Strikes Back, several members of the Apogee team (including Richard Edlund and Dennis Muren) would return to ILM but Dykstra did not join them. He continued to work under his Apogee brand name and subsequently went to work on the effects for Avalanche Express and Star Trek: The Motion Picture (on which he was reunited with Douglas Trumbull).

== The 1980s ==
Dykstra was called in by director Harold Ramis to expand presence of the gopher character in the 1980 film Caddyshack with a $500,000 budget. During the editing process, Ramis realized that the single scene puppetered by effects artist Pat Brymer could be expanded to fill in gaps in the story left in the editing process. Dykstra's company also provided lighting and explosion effect for the film.

Dykstra's next major achievement was the effects work on Firefox in 1982. Here, he took on the same challenge that Lucas had set with The Empire Strikes Back of combining miniature effects with actual backgrounds and matte work on white backgrounds using reverse bluescreen. The film secured further awards but was only a modest box office hit.

In 1985, Dykstra produced the special effects for the sci-fi horror film Lifeforce which was made in England. He followed with work on the 1986 remake of Invaders from Mars and My Stepmother Is an Alien (1988). Apogee Inc also did the effects for the spoof comedy Spaceballs (1987).

In the late 1980s Dykstra was asked by Nissan Motor Company of Japan to work on special effects for a commercial for the introduction of the Nissan R32 Skyline. He stated in an interview that ran before the commercial that he got out his "Special Effects Atlas" to provide a world that "not only looked different" but also had some "very unusual inhabitants": the "Space Fish". The Space Fish can be seen following and then examining the new Skyline during the ad.

== Comic book films ==
In the mid-1990s, Dykstra was supervisor for the special effects of Batman Forever and Batman & Robin. He was also Senior Visual Effects Supervisor for Stuart Little. Dykstra was the visual effects designer on the first two Spider-Man films, and received an Oscar for Best Visual Effects for his work on Spider-Man 2. He acted as the visual effects designer on X-Men: First Class, ensuring the six effects companies involved delivered all the shots required despite the tight schedule.

== Video games ==
In 1987, Dykstra directed the full-motion video game Sewer Shark, originally intended for Hasbro's VHS-based NEMO console. When Hasbro abandoned the project, the system's creator Tom Zito acquired the rights to the game. In 1992, Sewer Shark was converted to the Sega CD by Zito's Digital Pictures, and released as a launch title for the system.

== Academy Awards ==
=== Two Academy Awards for Best Visual Effects ===
- 1978 (50th): for Best Visual Effects for Star Wars (1977), shared with John Stears, Richard Edlund, Grant McCune, and Robert Blalack
- 2005 (77th): for Best Visual Effects for Spider-Man 2 (2004), shared with Scott Stokdyk, Anthony LaMolinara, and John Frazier

=== One Academy Award for Technical Achievement ===
- 1978 (50th): "for the development of the Dykstraflex Camera" for Star Wars (1977), shared with Alvah J. Miller and Jerry Jeffress (Note: Dykstra was granted for the development of the Dykstraflex Camera and Alvah J. Miller and Jerry Jeffress were both granted for the engineering of the Electronic Motion Control System.)

== Other awards ==
=== Saturn Awards ===
- 1978: for Best Special Effects for Star Wars (1977), shared with John Stears
- 1980: for Best Special Effects for Star Trek: The Motion Picture (1979), shared with Douglas Trumbull and Richard Yuricich
- 2005: for Best Special Effects for Spider-Man 2 (2004), shared with Scott Stokdyk, Anthony LaMolinara, and John Frazier

=== Primetime Emmy Awards ===
- 1979: for Outstanding Individual Achievement and Creative Technical Crafts for the pilot episode (Saga of a Star World) from the 1978 Battlestar Galactica TV series, shared with Richard Edlund (director of miniature photography) and Joseph Goss (mechanical special effects)

=== Hollywood Film Awards ===
- 2004: for Visual Effects of the Year for Spider-Man 2 (2004)

=== OFTA Film Awards ===
- 2005: OFTA Film Award (Note: "OFTA" stands for "Online Film and Television Association".) for Best Visual Effects for Spider-Man 2 (2004), shared with Scott Stokdyk, Anthony LaMolinara and John Frazier

=== Sitges Award for Best Special Effects ===
- 1986: Caixa Catalunya Award for Best Special Effects (Note: This award (presented annually) is the Special Effects Award attributed by the Sitges Film Festival (located in Spain), but its name has changed among years, depending on different sponsors. In 1986 it was called "Premio Caixa Catalunya a los Mejores Efectos Especiales" ("Caixa Catalunya Award for Best Special Effects") because that year the sponsor was Caixa Catalunya, a local bank.) for Lifeforce (1985)

=== Golden Satellite Awards ===
- 2000: for Best Visual Effects for Stuart Little (1999), shared with Jerome Chen, Henry F. Anderson III and Eric Allard

=== Visual Effects Society Awards ===
- 2007: Honorary Membership Award
- 2014: Lifetime Achievement Award
