= Kong: Skull Island =

2017 film by Jordan Vogt-Roberts

- Theatrical release poster
- Directed by: Jordan Vogt-Roberts
- Screenplay by: Dan Gilroy; Max Borenstein; Derek Connolly
- Story by: John Gatins
- Based on: King Kong by: Edgar Wallace; Merian C. Cooper
- Produced by: Thomas Tull; Mary Parent; Jon Jashni; Alex Garcia
- Starring: Tom Hiddleston; Samuel L. Jackson; John Goodman; Brie Larson; Jing Tian; Toby Kebbell; John Ortiz; Corey Hawkins; Jason Mitchell; Shea Whigham; Thomas Mann; Terry Notary; John C. Reilly
- Cinematography: Larry Fong
- Edited by: Richard Pearson
- Music by: Henry Jackman
- Production company: Legendary Pictures
- Distributed by: Warner Bros. Pictures
- Release dates: February 28, 2017 (Empire, Leicester Square); March 10, 2017 (United States)
- Running time: 118 minutes
- Country: United States
- Language: English
- Budget: $185 million
- Box office: $570.9 million

Kong: Skull Island is a 2017 American monster film directed by Jordan Vogt-Roberts and written by Dan Gilroy, Max Borenstein and Derek Connolly. Produced by Legendary Pictures and distributed by Warner Bros. Pictures, it is a reboot of the King Kong franchise, the second film in the Legendary's Monsterverse franchise, and the eighth film in the King Kong franchise. The film stars Tom Hiddleston, Samuel L. Jackson, John Goodman, Brie Larson, Jing Tian, Toby Kebbell, John Ortiz, Corey Hawkins, Jason Mitchell, Shea Whigham, Thomas Mann, Eugene Cordero, Marc Evan Jackson, Terry Notary, and John C. Reilly. Set in 1973, the film follows a team of scientists and Vietnam War soldiers to an uncharted island in the Pacific Ocean named Skull Island where they encounter monsters, including the mighty Kong.

The film was announced in July 2014 at San Diego Comic-Con, and Vogt-Roberts was announced as the director in September 2014. The project began at Universal Pictures as an origin story but was moved to Warner Bros. to develop a shared cinematic universe featuring Godzilla and Kong. Principal photography began in October 2015 in Hawaii and various locations around Vietnam and ended in March 2016.

Kong: Skull Island was theatrically released on March 10, 2017 to generally positive reviews from critics. It was a box office success, grossing $570 million against a $185 million budget, and received a nomination for Best Visual Effects at the 90th Academy Awards.

A sequel, Godzilla vs. Kong, was released in 2021, and an animated series, Skull Island, was released in 2023.

== Plot ==
In 1944, two World War II fighter pilots, American pilot Hank Marlow and Japanese pilot Gunpei Ikari, parachute onto an island in the South Pacific after a dogfight and engage in close combat until the fight is interrupted by a giant ape.

In 1973, Bill Randa, head of the organization Monarch, convinces the government to allow him to lead a research expedition to the recently discovered Skull Island. He recruits a U.S. Army unit commanded by Lieutenant Colonel Preston Packard, tracker and former British Special Air Service Captain James Conrad, and anti-war photographer Mason Weaver.

Arriving at Skull Island, Packard's men begin dropping seismic explosives, developed by Bill's seismologist Houston Brooks, to map out the island and prove Brooks's Hollow Earth theory. The unit is suddenly attacked by the giant ape, scattering the survivors across the island; Conrad, Weaver, Landsat official Nieves, Brooks, researcher and biologist San Lin, and one of the soldiers (Slivko) head north to reach a planned extraction point, while Packard, the rest of his men, Bill and another Landsat official search for Packard's right-hand man, Chapman, who is isolated from the group.

Conrad's group encounters the local Iwi natives and an older Marlow. Marlow tells the group about the giant ape, named Kong. Kong protects the island from predators, including subterranean reptilian creatures dubbed "Skullcrawlers", which were awakened from the bombing and responsible for killing Kong's entire species, leaving him as the last of his kind. The Iwi believe when Kong dies, a larger Skullcrawler will awaken and ravage the island. Marlow reveals he and Ikari became friends during their time on the island, but Ikari was killed by a Skullcrawler some time ago. While Chapman is ambushed and devoured by a Skullcrawler, Conrad's group helps Marlow finish a boat made from parts of Marlow's and Ikari's downed planes. They ride down the river, where Nieves is torn apart by carnivorous Leafwings, and they secure communication with Packard's group.

When they regroup with Packard, he insists on searching for Chapman. Marlow leads them through a mass grave of dinosaurs and Kong's family members. The Skullcrawler that killed Chapman attacks them, killing Bill and other soldiers before Weaver triggers a flammable gas explosion that kills it. Upon learning of Chapman's death, Packard reveals his plan to kill Kong and avenge his fallen men. Marlow and Brooks attempt to explain that killing Kong would lead to the Skullcrawlers running rampant, but Packard refuses to listen. The groups part ways, with Packard's group and Slivko retrieving the weapons from Chapman's chopper and laying a trap for Kong at a nearby lake, while the rest head back to the boat. Conrad and Weaver meet Kong up-close and, seeing his true peaceful nature, resolve to save him.

Packard's group lures Kong with the remaining seismic charges and incapacitates him with ignited napalm. Conrad, Weaver, and Marlow intervene and, after a standoff, persuade the other soldiers to spare Kong, but Packard refuses to yield. The larger Skullcrawler finally emerges from the lake, forcing everyone but Packard to retreat; Packard prepares to detonate the charges, but Kong crushes him first. The Skullcrawler overpowers Kong and chases the group, until Kong returns and kills it with the humans' help. The survivors reach the rendezvous point and leave the island as Kong stoically watches.

In the aftermath, Marlow reunites with his wife and meets his son for the first time. In a post-credits scene, Monarch detains and recruits Conrad and Weaver, who are informed by Lin and Brooks that Kong is not the only monster king and show archive footage of cave paintings depicting Godzilla, Mothra, Rodan, and King Ghidorah. The final image shows Godzilla and Ghidorah in battle. (Note: As depicted in Godzilla: King of the Monsters (2019))

== Cast ==
- Tom Hiddleston as James Conrad:
  An ex-British Special Air Service Captain who served in the Vietnam War with the Australian Special Air Service Regiment that Randa hires as a hunter-tracker for the expedition. Hiddleston described his character as a man who holds "no political allegiance in the conflict" but "understands conflict." He further states, "He's a former soldier who has been formed by an understanding of war, but his specific skill set is something that's attached to the power of nature; and I think that's something people haven't seen in a long time."
- Samuel L. Jackson as Preston Packard:
  The United States Army Lieutenant Colonel and Sky Devils helicopter squadron leader assigned to be the expedition's military escort. Jackson compares his character to Captain Ahab from Moby-Dick, stating, "He does have to exact some measure of revenge for the people he's lost. That's just the nature of how we operate—eye for an eye!"
- John Goodman as William "Bill" Randa:
  A senior official in the government organization Monarch, who is in charge of the expedition.
- Brie Larson as Mason Weaver:
  An anti-war photographer and investigative photojournalist. Larson stated her character has her "own sort of motive" for joining the expedition: "That's the interesting thing about this movie. It's a group of misfits that are all coming from different angles looking at the same thing. You get to see how many different views in regards to nature and how we should handle it are dealt with from many different perspectives". Larson further added that Weaver has an "interest and respect for nature" and "Through that she has a closer, more loving, and intimate relationship with Kong."
- Jing Tian as San Lin:
  A biologist working for Monarch. According to Vogt-Roberts and Borenstein, her role was initially larger, but rewrites reduced it. Alison de Souza of the Straits Times wrote that in the final film, Jing Tian's role would be described in Chinese as a "hua ping" (花瓶), meaning a vase, which refers to insignificant parts, and that she "hardly does or says a thing."
- Toby Kebbell as Jack Chapman:
  A United States Army major and Sea Stallion helicopter pilot who is Packard's right-hand man.
- John Ortiz as Victor Nieves:
  A senior Landsat official on the expedition.
- Corey Hawkins as Houston Brooks:
  A geologist and Yale University graduate, recruited by Monarch for his groundbreaking theories on seismology. An older version portrayed by Joe Morton appears in Godzilla: King of the Monsters.
- Jason Mitchell as Glenn Mills:
  A warrant officer, helicopter pilot of the Sky Devils, and close friend of Cole.
- Shea Whigham as Earl Cole:
  A seasoned Captain of the Sky Devils who wields an AK-47 instead of an M16 and a close friend of Mills.
- Thomas Mann as Reg Slivko:
  A Sky Devils warrant officer, known for carrying a portable record player.
- Terry Notary and Toby Kebbell as Kong (mo-cap performance):
  A 104 feet (31.7 m)-tall ape who is the last of his kind and is worshiped as the king and god on Skull Island by the Iwi natives. Notary stated that this Kong is an adolescent, and he tried to play Kong like a "14-year-old that's trapped in the life of an adult", saying it took three days to film the motion capture scenes. Besides playing Chapman, Toby Kebbell also provided some facial references for Kong, stating, "I gave some facial reference – certain subtleties, certain looks. Terry and I worked on stuff together and created what Kong needed. I was just there as backup for pieces that Terry really wanted to get details on. It's a real honor to be asked by someone who's a great performer, to come and help support their performance."
- John C. Reilly as Hank Marlow:
  A U.S. Army Air Forces lieutenant of the 45th Pursuit Squadron stranded on Skull Island for nearly 29 years since World War II. He knows the island's creatures and is a friend of the Iwi natives. Will Brittain portrays a young Hank Marlow and also plays Marlow's son.

Additionally, Eugene Cordero appears as Reles, a Sky Devils warrant officer and Packard's door gunner; Marc Evan Jackson portrays Steve Woodward, a Landsat employee on the expedition; Richard Jenkins portrays Senator Al Willis, a politician who reluctantly funds the expedition; Miyavi portrays Gunpei Ikari, a Japanese World War II pilot who crash-lands on Skull Island alongside Marlow; and Robert Taylor plays the captain of the Athena. Thomas Middleditch, who would later play a key role in Godzilla: King of the Monsters, voices Jerry. Moisés Arias, Nick Robinson, and Erin Moriarty appear as bar guests, while Dat Phan portrays a bar thug.

== Production ==
=== Development ===
In 2013, Peter Jackson, director of the 2005 remake of King Kong, initially handpicked Adam Wingard to direct Skull Island, a sequel to Jackson's film. Jackson later suggested Guillermo del Toro. Upon the film transitioning studios, Wingard and Jackson were dropped from the project, while producer Mary Parent remained on board. The film was officially announced by Legendary Pictures at the 2014 San Diego Comic-Con, and Universal Pictures was the distributor. Legendary then moved the project to Warner Bros. to develop a crossover film featuring Kong and Godzilla. Legendary offered Joe Cornish the job of directing the film. In September 2014, the studio announced that Jordan Vogt-Roberts would direct the film. In 2016, the then-newly launched Tencent Pictures provided financial support to the film, but the China-based studio did not produce the project.

=== Writing ===
The script had some screenwriters attached before filming. Seeking continuity between the King Kong and Godzilla worlds, Max Borenstein (writer of 2014's Godzilla) wrote the first draft, while John Gatins was hired to write the second draft. In writing the script, Borenstein did not want to repeat the "Beauty and the Beast" plot synonymous with King Kong movies and took into account the outdated elements of the treatment of the island natives and the damsel in distress. His initial influence was Apocalypse Now, revealing,

"What popped into my head for the paradigm of the movie was Apocalypse Now. That's obviously a war movie, but I liked the idea of people moving upriver to face a misunderstood force that they think of as a villain, but ultimately they come to realize is much more complicated."

Before Vogt-Roberts signed on as director, Borenstein thought of having the film begin during the Vietnam War and jump forward to the present day. After Legendary rejected it, Borenstein instead had the film take place before the original King Kong film in 1917 during World War I while keeping the Apocalypse Now concept. The premise had Tom Hiddleston's character leading a rescue team to Skull Island to find his missing brother, who got stranded there while searching for a "Titan Serum" believed to cure all illnesses. After this, Borenstein again retooled the story to take place in the present day.

After Jordan Vogt-Roberts joined the project, he met with Borenstein. Liking the Apocalypse Now concept, Vogt-Roberts pitched it to Legendary with the story taking place at the end of the Vietnam War, which the studio accepted. It was later revealed that Dan Gilroy had also collaborated on the Borenstein/Gatins draft. On August 18, 2015, it was confirmed that Derek Connolly was also doing script rewrites. Borenstein worked a final pass on the screenplay before shooting began and credited the script to all of the writers, saying, "It was definitely collaborative in terms of what's on the screen, though none of us worked together. There are pieces of my work in there as well as the work of the other two writers and John Gatins, who was credited for story. Everybody had a really good hand in it."

Gilroy revealed that many backstories and character moments were dropped from his draft, specifically for Mason Weaver and James Conrad's characters, feeling that the film had room to explore them. Gilroy disclosed,

"Brie's [character] was somebody who was really war-weary and had taken photographs for far too long. She didn't believe in anything – so the first time she saw Kong, it was like an awakening. She comes [back to life]. Tom [Hiddleston]'s character was a guy whose unit had been attacked by a big monster out of Vietnam – so he was in search of this thing. Instead of them approaching him at the bar and giving him a job, I had him like, 'I want on board.' I like those characters a lot… but they didn't want to go with that."

Despite these ideas being dropped, Gilroy felt the film turned out to be a "good movie" regardless. In April 2016, artist Joe DeVito sued producers of the movie for using elements of his Skull Island universe, which he claimed he created and the producers used without his permission.

=== Creature design ===
Kong as designed for Kong: Skull Island by show VFX Supervisor Stephen Rosenbaum and conceptual artist Carlos Huante

Director Vogt-Roberts asked Stephen Rosenbaum who hired Carlos Huante to help create the creature design for Kong. He and the team wanted it to be a combination of new-school and old-school techniques; using keyframe animation to give it the scale that it needed while developing motion-capture facial expressions that added to his character. Vogt-Roberts wanted Kong to look iconic and straightforward enough that a third-grader could draw him, and the image would still be recognizable. Vogt-Roberts also wanted Kong to feel like a "lonely god, he was a morose figure, lumbering around this island," and took the design back to the 1933 incarnation, which presented Kong as a "bipedal creature that walks in an upright position."

Vogt-Roberts stated, "If anything, our Kong is meant to be a throwback to the '33 version. [Kong] was a movie monster, so we worked really hard to take some of the elements of the '33 version, some of those exaggerated features, some of those cartoonish and iconic qualities, and then make them their own…We created something that to some degree served as a throwback to the inspiration for what started all of this, but then also [had] it be a fully unique and different creature that – I would like to think – is fully contained and identifiable as the 2017 version of King Kong. I think there are very modern elements to him, yet hopefully, he feels very timeless at the same time."

Hayao Miyazaki's Princess Mononoke helped influence the monsters' design and approach; Vogt-Roberts stated, "Miyazaki['s] Princess Mononoke was actually a big reference in the way that the spirit creatures sort of have their own domains and fit within that. So a big thing [was] trying to design creatures that felt realistic and could exist in an ecosystem that feels sort of wild and out there, and then also design things that simultaneously felt beautiful and horrifying at the same time."

The two-armed pit lizard from the 1933 King Kong film was used as a reference for the Skullcrawlers. They were also inspired by a number of other cinematic creatures; Vogt-Roberts stated, "That creature, beyond being a reference to a creature from the 1933 film, is also this crazy fusion of all of the influences throughout my life – like the first angel from Evangelion, and No-Face from Spirited Away, and Cubone from Pokémon."

=== Casting ===
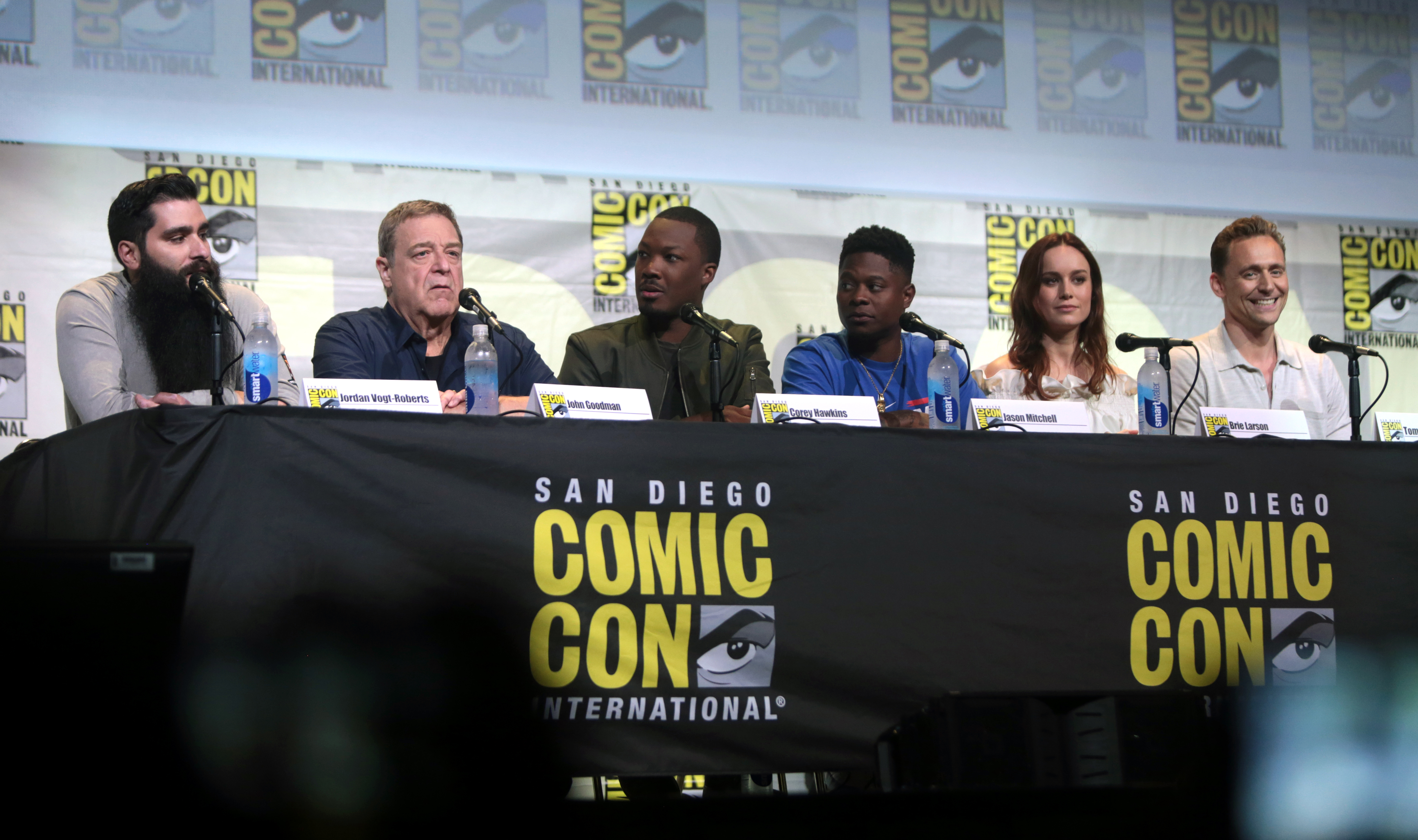
The cast and director of Kong: Skull Island at the 2016 San Diego Comic-Con to promote the film

At the same time as the announcement of Vogt-Roberts as director, the studio announced that Tom Hiddleston would play the lead role. For a time, both J. K. Simmons and Michael Keaton were attached to roles, but they left due to scheduling difficulties. In July 2015, Brie Larson was cast in the film to play the female lead. On August 5, 2015, it was announced that Corey Hawkins joined the cast in a supporting role. In August 2015, Deadline Hollywood reported that the studio was in early talks with Samuel L. Jackson to replace the role Simmons vacated, while John C. Reilly was eyed for Keaton's role but not offered it yet. Tom Wilkinson was offered a role in the film.

In August 2015, Toby Kebbell joined the film's cast, while Jackson and Reilly were confirmed for roles. Jackson's deal was worth five million dollars. In August 2015, Jason Mitchell joined the cast to play a pilot. In September 2015, John Goodman was cast to play Randa, a government official and leader of an expedition and Thomas Mann was also cast. In October 2015, John Ortiz and Shea Whigham were added to the cast in unspecified roles. In October 2015, Eugene Cordero joined the film. In November 2015, it was announced that Will Brittain had joined the cast, portraying a pilot, in one of the last key leads in the film. In May 2016, Toby Kebbell revealed that Terry Notary would perform Kong through motion capture and that Kebbell provided some guidance for Kong's motion capture sequences.

=== Filming ===
Principal photography on the film began on October 19, 2015, and concluded on March 18, 2016. Filming took place in the northern portion of Vietnam, including Tràng An, Vân Long and Tam Cốc (Ninh Bình Province), Hạ Long Bay (Quảng Ninh Province), and the entrance of Tú Làn Caves System (Tân Hoá, Trung Hoá Village, Minh Hoá District Quảng Bình Province) with the help of The Creatv Company in Vietnam and Nicholas Simon as line producer.

Filming also took place on the island of Oahu in Hawaii, with Renee Confair as production supervisor, and Australia's Gold Coast, with Jennifer Cornwell as production manager for the unit. Locations included Honolulu's Chinatown and the Kualoa Ranch and Waikane Valley (Ohulehule Forest Conservancy) on Oahu. In mid-January 2016, filming started in the Gold Coast, Queensland, Australia.

== Influences ==
Vogt-Roberts has cited several films that influenced Kong: Skull Island:

If I were going to break it down for people, I'd say you obviously have Apocalypse Now and just the era of '70s filmmaking, with films like The Conversation, too. Also, Platoon was an inspiration, and the South Korean film The Host as well. The entire Neon Genesis Evangelion series was a big influence. There's a huge anime and video game influence in my DNA, and I think it very much bred itself into this film.

Other inspirations include the South Korean films The Good, the Bad, the Weird and Oldboy, plus video games like the Aliens series, The Legend of Zelda series, and Shadow of the Colossus. The film's opening scene where an American and a Japanese pilot are stranded on the same island was inspired by Hell in the Pacific (1968). The animated works Spirited Away and Princess Mononoke by Hayao Miyazaki influenced the approach and design of the monsters in Kong: Skull Island, as did Sachiel from Neon Genesis Evangelion, Cubone from Pokémon, and the two-legged lizard from the original King Kong. The film also references the Italian horror movie Cannibal Holocaust when a giant spider impales a soldier with its leg.

== Music ==
Henry Jackman composed the score. Jackman blended '70s psychedelic guitars into the score to blend with the film's setting in the 1970s. Vogt-Roberts wanted to use songs from the Vietnam era and a myriad of hits from then as it provides a "striking dichotomy, sets the tone and gives us great moments of fun." The score was recorded at AIR Lyndhurst Studios with the London Voices and conducted by Gavin Greenaway, with additional music by Alex Belcher, Halli Cauthery, and Stephen Hilton. The soundtrack was digitally released in March 2017, through WaterTower Music and then later released in 2018 by Waxwork Records on a double LP.

== Release ==
=== Merchandise ===
The merchandise for the film was a Walmart exclusive in 2017. A large Kong figure was the main toy featuring a Jack Chapman with a missile launcher. In addition to Walmart selling the toys, Amazon.com sells them too. Also, two costumes for Kong were made and sold during Halloween. One of them is a standard costume, while the other was an inflatable Kong suit.

On April 7, 2017, Legendary announced a four-issue graphic novel series called Skull Island: The Birth of Kong. Acting as both a prequel and sequel to the film, an adult Houston Brooks nearing retirement from Monarch in 2012 learns that his missing estranged son with San Lin, Aaron, led a team on a secret mission to Skull Island in the mid-1990s. During the mission, the team uncovered secrets of Kong's past and how he became the last of his kind. Written by Arvid Nelson with interior and cover art by Mohammad "Zid" Yazid (issue No. 4 cover art done by Drew Johnson), the four-issue series was released between April 12 and November 21, 2017. On December 12, 2017, a paperback collection was released. A novelization by Tim Lebbon was released on March 14, 2017.

=== Theatrical ===
Kong: Skull Island was originally scheduled to be released on November 4, 2016, but was pushed back to March 10, 2017. The new release date coincided with the franchise's 84th anniversary. It was presented in 70mm in select cinemas. The film premiered at the Cineworld Empire Leicester Square in London on February 28, 2017.

=== Home media ===
Kong: Skull Island was released on HD Digital on June 20, 2017, and on 4K Ultra HD, 3D Blu-ray, Blu-ray, and DVD on July 18, 2017. The film debuted at the top of the NPD VideoScan First Alert sales chart and the dedicated Blu-ray chart for the week ending on July 23, 2017. In the United States and Canada, the DVD earned $16.6 million and the Blu-ray earned $23.3 million, totaling $39.9 million in domestic video sales.

== Reception ==
=== Box office ===
Kong: Skull Island grossed $168.1 million in the United States and Canada and $402.8 million in other territories for a worldwide gross of $570.9 million. With a production budget of $185 million, with about $136 million more spent on international marketing costs, the film needed to make at least $450–500 million worldwide to break-even.

In the United States and Canada, Kong: Skull Island was projected to gross $40–50 million in its opening weekend, as well as a worldwide debut of $110–135 million. The film made $20.2 million on its first day from 3,846 theaters, including $3.7 million it made from Thursday night previews. In total, the film earned a better-than-expected $61 million on its opening weekend, defying the film's initial projection by 35%. It made $7.6 million from 382 theaters in IMAX, representing 12.5% of the film's entire opening weekend. In its second weekend, the film grossed $27.8 million (a drop of 54.4%), finishing second at the box office behind newcomer Beauty and the Beast.

Internationally, the film debuted with $85.1 million from 20,900 screens in 65 markets. It opened in every market except Japan and China. The film scored the fourth-biggest March release with $4.8 million from 672 theaters in IMAX (the second biggest without China in it). The biggest openings came from the United Kingdom, Ireland ($7.6 million); South Korea ($7.4 million); Russia ($6.2 million); Mexico ($5.7 million); France ($4.1 million); Taiwan ($3.6 million); Australia ($3.6 million); Brazil ($3.4 million), Germany ($3.4 million); Malaysia ($2.65 million); India ($2.4 million); Spain ($1.6 million), and Italy ($1.6 million). In Vietnam (where the film was primarily shot and set), it scored the biggest opening of all time there with $2.5 million; this was the week after a huge model of the primate outside the theater caught on fire at the film's premiere. The film would eventually open in China with $71.6 million (its largest international market) and $3.5 million in Japan, where the film was released as King Kong: Giant God of Skull Island (Kingu Kongu: Dokurotou no Kyoshin). After its overseas run, the film would gross US$400 million internationally. It is the second highest-grossing film in the Monsterverse to date.

=== Critical response ===
Kong: Skull Island received generally positive reviews from critics. On the review aggregator website Rotten Tomatoes, 75% of 390 critics' reviews are positive, with an average rating of 6.5/10. The website's consensus reads: "Offering exhilarating eye candy, solid acting, and a fast-paced story, Kong: Skull Island earns its spot in the movie monster's mythos without ever matching up to the classic original." Metacritic, which uses a weighted average, assigned the film a score of 62 out of 100, based on 50 critics, indicating "generally favorable" reviews. Audiences polled by CinemaScore gave the film an average grade of "B+" on an A+ to F scale. Audiences surveyed by PostTrak gave the film an overall positive score of 80%, and 60% of the audience would definitely recommend it.

Michael Phillips of The Chicago Tribune lauded the film, giving it three-and-a-half stars out of four: "I saw little in [Vogt-Roberts'] first feature to indicate the deftness and buoyant spirit he brings to Skull Island. This time, the money's on the screen, but it bought a really good movie, too." Mike Ryan of Uproxx gave the film a positive review, noting, "Kong: Skull Island is still a hoot. It was a movie that was not at all on my radar as something I was dying to see and yet I had way too much fun watching it. I just wished it had embraced its craziness just a little bit more. (But, yes, there's still plenty of crazy to go around.)" Todd McCarthy of The Hollywood Reporter gave the film a positive review as well, stating that "all the requisite elements are served up here in ideal proportion, and the time just flies by, which can rarely be said for films of this nature." Kyle Anderson of Nerdist News found the film entertaining but flawed, saying, "It's certainly not a perfect movie, and a lot of the characters feel like sketches more than fully-fledged people, but it roars along enjoyably from start to finish."

Conversely, Peter Bradshaw of The Guardian awarded the film one out of five stars. In his negative review, he described the movie as a "fantastically muddled and exasperatingly dull quasi-update of the King Kong story." Matthew Lickona of The San Diego Reader also gave the film one out of five stars, writing: "It's fun to watch [the monsters] in action, but on the human side, the film is clumsily written, over-cast and underacted, with only frustrated soldier Samuel L. Jackson striking the right tone of crazy amid the chaos." Chris Klimek of NPR mentions how "Kong is at its mediocre best when it pretends to be a nature documentary about Skull Island's bizarro flora and fauna," but lamented how "every time the movie threatens to get interesting, one of its hordes of ersatz, non-animated characters shows up and starts talking again." Anthony Lane of The New Yorker noted that what the film "yearns to be, is a pop-culture Apocalypse Now, with the human foe removed, the political parable toned down, and the gonzo elements jacked up." J.R. Jones questioned the film's setting, saying "this Jurassic Park knockoff takes place neither in the Depression era, which gave us the original King Kong, nor in the present, when satellite photos would surely alert us to the existence of a 100-foot gorilla. Instead—and for no reason I can fathom, except perhaps the classic-rock tunes desired for the soundtrack—the story takes place in 1973, when the Vietnam war is winding down and President Nixon is being driven from office."

Regarding Larson's role in the film, Ann Hornaday of The Washington Post stated that Larson "serves as a cautionary poster girl for aspiring actresses everywhere: One year you're winning an Oscar for a sensitive, skillfully layered performance in an emotionally demanding drama; the next, you're widening your eyes and gasping your way through a great big monkey movie." Michael Salfino of The Wall Street Journal remarked, "a starring role in a popcorn movie on the heels of a passion project can open up an actor to ridicule."

=== Accolades ===
Award	Date of ceremony	Category	Recipients	Result	Ref.
Teen Choice Awards	August 13, 2017	Choice Movie: Sci-Fi		Nominated	
Teen Choice Awards	August 13, 2017	Choice Movie Actor: Sci-Fi	Tom Hiddleston	Nominated	
Teen Choice Awards	August 13, 2017	Choice Movie Actress: Sci-Fi	Brie Larson	Nominated	
Annie Award	February 3, 2018	Outstanding Achievement for Character Animation in a Live Action Production	Jance Rubinchik, Adrian Millington, Alberto Martinez Arce, Kyle Winkelman	Nominated	
Visual Effects Society Awards	February 13, 2018	Outstanding Visual Effects in a Photoreal Feature	Jeff White, Tom Peitzman, Stephen Rosenbaum, Scott Benza, Michael Meinardus	Nominated	
Visual Effects Society Awards	February 13, 2018	Outstanding Animated Character in a Photoreal Feature	Jakub Pistecky, Chris Havreberg, Karin Cooper, Kris Costa for "Kong"	Nominated	
Visual Effects Society Awards	February 13, 2018	Outstanding Effects Simulations in a Photoreal Feature	Florent Andorra, Alexis Hall, Raul Essig, Branko Grujcic	Nominated	
Visual Effects Society Awards	February 13, 2018	Outstanding Compositing in a Photoreal Feature	Nelson Sepulveda, Aaron Brown, Paolo Acri, Shawn Mason	Nominated	
Academy Awards	March 4, 2018	Best Visual Effects	Stephen Rosenbaum, Jeff White, Scott Benza, Michael Meinardus	Nominated	
Golden Trailer Awards	June 6, 2017	Best Teaser Poster	Kong: Skull Island	Won	
Golden Trailer Awards	June 6, 2017	Best Action	Kong: Skull Island	Nominated	
Golden Trailer Awards	June 6, 2017	Best Sound Editing	Kong: Skull Island	Nominated	
Golden Trailer Awards	June 6, 2017	Best Fantasy/Adventure TV Spot	Kong: Skull Island	Nominated	
Golden Trailer Awards	June 6, 2017	Best Action Poster	Kong: Skull Island	Nominated	
Golden Trailer Awards	June 6, 2017	Best Fantasy / Adventure Poster	Kong: Skull Island	Nominated	
Saturn Awards	June 27, 2018	Best Fantasy Film	Thomas Tull, Mary Parent, Jon Jashni and Alex Garcia	Nominated	
Saturn Awards	June 27, 2018	Best Film Special / Visual Effects	Stephen Rosenbaum, Jeff White, Scott Benza, Michael Meinardus	Nominated	

== Sequel ==
In September 2015, Legendary moved Kong: Skull Island from Universal to Warner Bros., which sparked media speculation that Godzilla and King Kong would appear in a film together. In October 2015, Legendary confirmed that they would unite Godzilla and King Kong in Godzilla vs. Kong. Legendary plans to create a shared cinematic franchise "centered around Monarch" that "brings together Godzilla and Legendary's King Kong in an ecosystem of other giant super-species, both classic and new." Director Jordan Vogt-Roberts had expressed interest in doing a film about Marlow and Gunpei's time on the island, stating, "I keep joking that personally I'm more interested in doing a $30 million version of young John C. Reilly on the island. Just some weird, the odd-ball monster comedy with him and Gunpei." In Godzilla: King of the Monsters (2019), Joe Morton appears as an older Dr. Houston Brooks, a character originally portrayed by Corey Hawkins in Kong: Skull Island. Godzilla vs. Kong was released on March 24, 2021.

In January 2021, Netflix and Legendary Television announced plans for an anime-style series set in the Monsterverse. A joint-venture between Legendary Television, Tractor Pants Productions, Powerhouse Animation Studios, and Netflix Animation, the series Skull Island was released on June 22, 2023. In November 2023, John Goodman reprised his Kong: Skull Island role as Bill Randa in the television series Monarch: Legacy of Monsters, alongside Anders Holm as a young Randa.
