= List of caves in Vietnam =

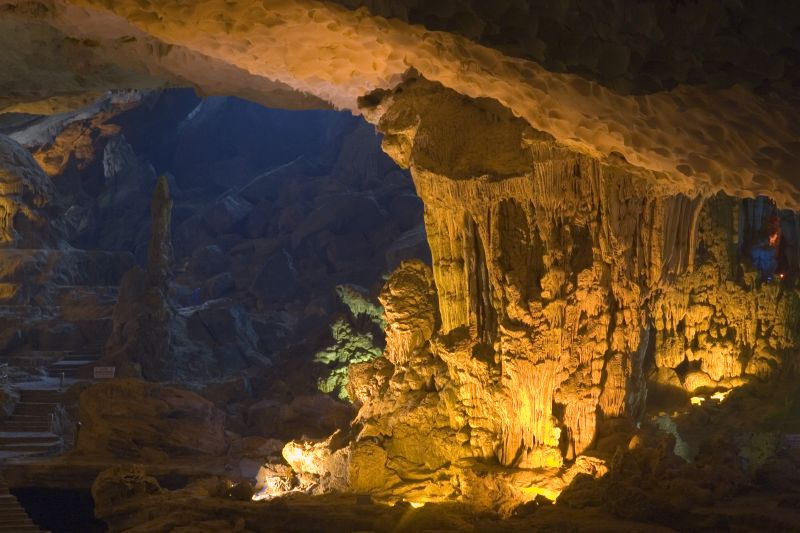
Hang Sửng Sốt Cave in Ha Long Bay.

This is a list of notable caves and cave systems in Vietnam.

== Caves in Vietnam ==
| Name | Depth (m) | Length (m) | Geology | Remarks |
|---|---|---|---|---|
| Cát Bà Island | | | | Cave system |
| Con Moong Cave | 8.5m | 30 to 40 m | | |
| Marble Mountains | | | karst | Cave complex; Da Nang Province |
| Lang Trang | | | karst | Thanh Hoa Province |
| Phong Nha Cave | Unknown | 7,729 m (25,358 ft) | karst | UNESCO World Heritage site; Quang Binh province |
| Sơn Đoòng Cave | 150 m (490 ft) | 9,000 m (30,000 ft) | karst | Reputed to be the largest in the world; Quảng Bình Province |
| Tam Cốc-Bích Động | Unknown | 125 m (410 ft) | karst | Complex of three caves; Ninh Binh province |
| Thiên Đường Cave | Unknown | 31 m (102 ft) | karst | Quảng Binh province |
| Tú Làn Caves System | | | | |

== See also ==
- Phong Nha-Kẻ Bàng National Park
- List of caves
