= Transformers: Dark of the Moon =

2011 film by Michael Bay

- Theatrical release poster
- Directed by: Michael Bay
- Written by: Ehren Kruger
- Based on: Hasbro's Transformers action figures
- Produced by: Lorenzo di Bonaventura; Tom DeSanto; Don Murphy; Ian Bryce
- Starring: Shia LaBeouf; Josh Duhamel; John Turturro; Tyrese Gibson; Rosie Huntington-Whiteley; Patrick Dempsey; Kevin Dunn; Julie White; John Malkovich; Frances McDormand
- Cinematography: Amir Mokri
- Edited by: Roger Barton; William Goldenberg; Joel Negron
- Music by: Steve Jablonsky
- Production companies: Paramount Pictures; Hasbro Studios; di Bonaventura Pictures
- Distributed by: Paramount Pictures
- Release dates: June 23, 2011 (MIFF); June 29, 2011 (United States)
- Running time: 154 minutes
- Country: United States
- Language: English
- Budget: $195 million
- Box office: $1.124 billion

Transformers: Dark of the Moon is a 2011 American science fiction action film based on Hasbro's Transformers toy line. It is the sequel to Transformers: Revenge of the Fallen (2009) and the third installment in the Transformers film series. Like its predecessor, the film was directed by Michael Bay, and written by Ehren Kruger. Shia LaBeouf, Josh Duhamel, John Turturro, Tyrese Gibson, Kevin Dunn, and Julie White reprise their roles from the previous films, with Rosie Huntington-Whiteley, Patrick Dempsey, John Malkovich, and Frances McDormand joining the cast. In the film, Optimus Prime and Sam Witwicky must lead the Autobots against Megatron and the Decepticons as they battle to possess powerful technology abandoned on the Moon in order to restore Cybertron.

Development of a third Transformers film began in May 2007. The film employed both regular 35 mm film cameras and specially developed 3D cameras, with filming locations in Chicago, Florida, Indiana, Milwaukee, Moscow, and Washington, D.C. The visual effects involved more complex robots than the previous films, which took longer to render. The release date was moved from July 1 to June 29, in order to monitor an early response to footage.

Early screenings took place on June 28, 2011, one night before worldwide release by Paramount Pictures. The film received mixed reviews from critics and grossed $1.124 billion worldwide, becoming the fifth highest-grossing film in history at the time, and the second highest-grossing film of 2011. Like the first film, it was nominated for Best Sound Editing, Best Sound Mixing, and Best Visual Effects at the Academy Awards. It was followed by Transformers: Age of Extinction in 2014.

== Plot ==
The Ark spacecraft escapes Cybertron carrying an invention that could end the war between Autobots and Decepticons, and crash-lands on the dark side of Earth's Moon in 1962. NASA detects the crash, and President John F. Kennedy authorizes a mission to put a man on the Moon as a cover for investigating the spacecraft. In 1969, the crew of Apollo 11 lands on the Moon and secretly inspects the Ark before returning to Earth.

In the present day, three years after the battle of Egypt, (Note: As depicted in Transformers: Revenge of the Fallen (2009)) the Autobots help humanity prevent major conflicts. During a mission to the site of the 1986 Chernobyl nuclear disaster to investigate suspected alien technology, the Autobots are attacked by Decepticon scientist Shockwave and his giant worm Driller. After the two escape, Optimus Prime discovers the technology is an Ark fuel cell. The Autobots travel to the Moon and find Sentinel Prime, the Autobots' leader before Optimus, in a comatose state along with five Pillars he created to establish a "Space Bridge", a wormhole that can teleport matter between two points. On Earth, Optimus uses the Matrix of Leadership's energy to revive Sentinel.

Meanwhile, Sam Witwicky lives with his new girlfriend, Carly Spencer, but cannot work with the Autobots. At his new job, co-worker Jerry Wang gives him information about the Ark before the Decepticon Laserbeak assassinates him. Sam contacts Seymour Simmons to investigate the Decepticons' murders of people connected to the American and Soviet lunar space missions. They locate two surviving cosmonauts, who show photos of hundreds of Pillars on the Moon, and realize that the Decepticons raided the Ark long before the Apollo 11 mission and left Sentinel and the five Pillars for the Autobots to find, knowing that Sentinel was the key to activating the Pillars. The Autobots rush to return Sentinel to their base for protection, but he betrays them and kills Ironhide, revealing that he made a deal with Megatron to ensure Cybertron's survival.

Sentinel uses the Pillars to transport hundreds of concealed Decepticons from the Moon to Earth. Dylan Gould, Carly's boss, is revealed to be working with the Decepticons and captures Carly with Soundwave, disguised as Carly's car. At the Decepticons' demand, the Autobots are exiled from Earth, but Starscream destroys their ship as it takes off. The Decepticons invade Chicago while placing Pillars around the world to begin transporting Cybertron to the Solar System, planning to enslave humanity and use Earth's resources to rebuild their homeworld. Sam teams up with former NEST soldier Robert Epps to go into Chicago to save Carly and arrest Dylan. The Decepticons nearly kill them before the Autobots, who anticipated the trap and survived their ship's destruction, intervene. Sam, along with NEST teams led by Lennox and Navy SEALs, rescue Carly and begin fighting the Decepticons. During the battle, the Decepticons execute the Autobot Que, and Bumblebee kills Soundwave, while Optimus fights Sentinel. Laserbeak, Starscream, Shockwave, and the Driller are also killed in the ensuing battle. Meanwhile, Wheelie and Brains sneak onboard and sabotage the Decepticon mothership.

Carly convinces Megatron that Sentinel will replace him as Decepticon leader. Sam fights Dylan and knocks him into the Pillar, which electrocutes and kills him. Bumblebee destroys the Control Pillar, closing the Bridge and causing the partially transported Cybertron to implode. Sentinel overpowers Optimus, but is incapacitated by Megatron, who is determined to regain his leadership. Megatron offers a truce, but Optimus refuses and kills Megatron by tearing off his head, then executes Sentinel for his betrayal. Sam and Carly are reunited, and the Autobots remain on Earth as their hopeful home.

== Cast ==
=== Humans ===
- Shia LaBeouf as Sam Witwicky: The Autobots' human ally who's now a recent college graduate and once again must help stop the Decepticons.
- Josh Duhamel as Colonel William Lennox: A U.S. Army Rangers officer who commands the classified strike team NEST, an international joint task-force battling Decepticons with the Autobots.
- John Turturro as Seymour Simmons: Former agent in charge of the terminated Sector 7 unit and now a successful professional writer.
- Tyrese Gibson as Retired U.S. Air Force Combat Controller Chief Master Sergeant Robert Epps: The former NCO-in-Charge of the NEST strike team who now works at Kennedy Space Center.
- Rosie Huntington-Whiteley as Carly Spencer: Sam's new girlfriend and an Autobot ally.
- Patrick Dempsey as Dylan Gould: A wealthy car collector and Carly's employer who is secretly working with the Decepticons.
- Kevin Dunn as Ron Witwicky: Sam's father.
- Julie White as Judy Witwicky: Sam's mother.
- Ken Jeong as Jerry "Deep" Wang: Paranoid software programmer at Sam's work.
- Alan Tudyk as Dutch Gerhardt: Simmons' personal assistant. Tudyk said he played the role as the same character from the 2000 film 28 Days.
- Glenn Morshower as General Morshower: The director of NEST, who communicates with the squad from the Pentagon.
- Lester Speight as "Hardcore" Eddie: A former member of NEST.
- John Malkovich as Bruce Brazos: Sam's employer and boss at Accuretta Systems.
- Frances McDormand as Charlotte Mearing: The Director of National Intelligence.
- Elya Baskin as Cosmonaut Dimitri: One of the two surviving Russian cosmonauts who gives Sam information on the Moon missions.
- Josh Kelly as Stone, a former member of NEST.
- Ravil Isyanov as Voskhod: a Ukrainian government official who learns the existence of the Ark's fuel cell in Chernobyl. He is assassinated by Laserbeak after disclosing the information to Lennox.
- Andy Daly as Donnie: A mailroom worker who loathes Wang.
- Keiko Agena as the aide and assistant of Charlotte Mearing.
- Buzz Aldrin as himself: Meeting Optimus Prime at the NEST headquarters.
- Bill O'Reilly as himself: Interviewing Simmons through his television program The O'Reilly Factor.

=== Transformers ===
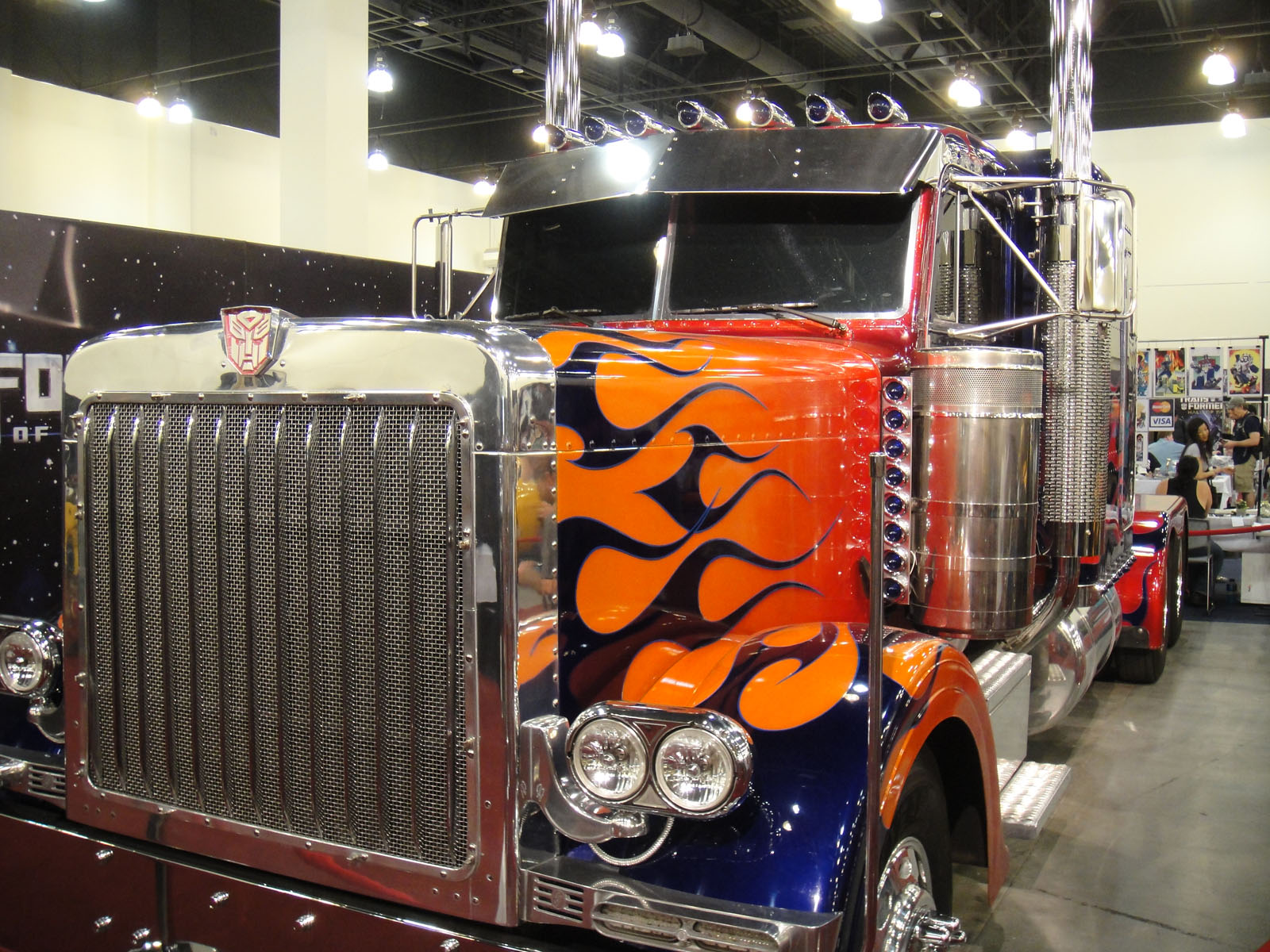
A Peterbilt 379 used for the alternate mode of Optimus Prime

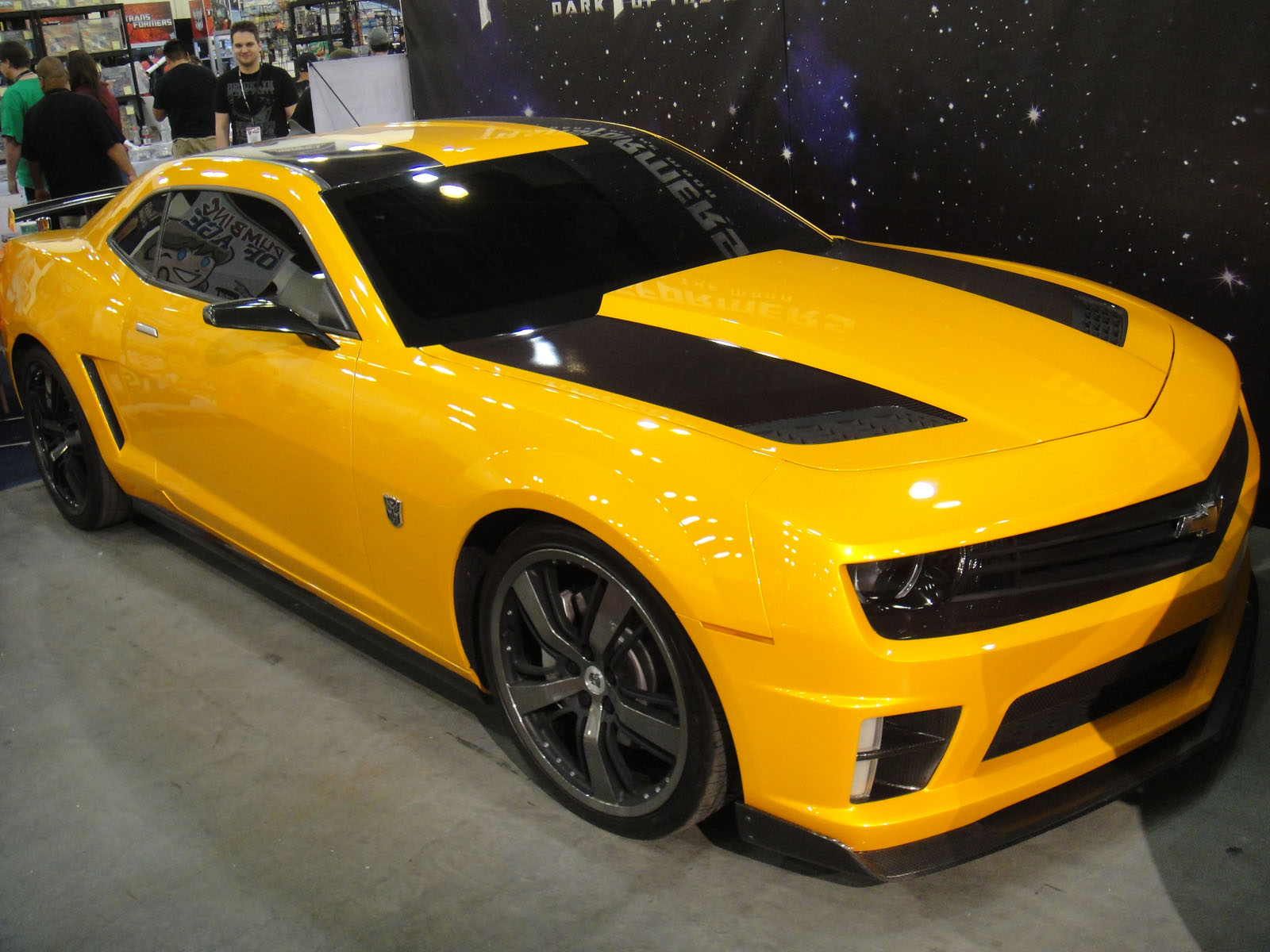
The Bumblebee Camaro from Transformers: Dark of the Moon at BotCon in 2011.

- Peter Cullen as Optimus Prime: The leader of the Autobots and keeper of the Matrix of Leadership who transforms into a red, yellow, orange, and blue 1994 Peterbilt 379 semi-trailer truck
- Leonard Nimoy as Sentinel Prime: Optimus's mentor and predecessor as the leader of the Autobots who transforms into a red and black Rosenbauer Panther fire truck. He is later revealed as a traitor and partner to the Decepticons. Nimoy previously voiced Galvatron in the 1986 Transformers animated film.
- Hugo Weaving as Megatron: The leader of the Decepticons and Prime's nemesis who is still badly wounded from the battle in Egypt and transforms into a rusty, modified 10-wheeler 2011 Mack Granite M915 LHRT oil tanker truck.
- Jess Harnell as Ironhide: The Autobot weapons specialist and Optimus Prime's second-in-command who transforms into a black 2009 GMC Topkick C4500.
- Robert Foxworth as Ratchet: The Autobot medical officer who transforms into a white and green 2009 search and rescue Hummer H2 ambulance.
- James Remar as Sideswipe: The Autobot combat instructor from Revenge of the Fallen who transforms into a silver 2011 Chevrolet Corvette Stingray convertible, who was previously voiced by André Sogliuzzo
- Francesco Quinn as Dino / Mirage: The Autobot spy who transforms into a red 2011 Ferrari 458 Italia. This was Quinn's final role before his death shortly after the film's release.
- George Coe as Que / Wheeljack: the Autobot engineer who invents gadgets, equipment, and weapons and transforms into a blue 2009 Mercedes-Benz E550.
- Tom Kenny as Wheelie: A former Decepticon drone turned Autobot from Revenge of the Fallen who transforms into a blue radio-controlled toy monster truck.
- Reno Wilson as Brains: Wheelie's partner and a fellow former Decepticon drone who transforms into a Lenovo ThinkPad Edge laptop computer.
- Charlie Adler as Starscream: Megatron's second-in-command who transforms into a Lockheed Martin F-22 Raptor.
- Frank Welker as:
  - Shockwave: The Decepticon scientist and assassin.
  - Soundwave: The Decepticon communications officer who transforms into a silver 2011 Mercedes-Benz SLS AMG.
  - Barricade: A Decepticon scout who mysteriously disappeared after the final battle in the first film.
- Ron Bottitta as Roadbuster (also credited as "Amp"): An Autobot Wrecker who transforms into Dale Earnhardt Jr.'s Hendrick Motorsports No. 88 AMP Energy/National Guard 2011 Chevrolet Impala.
- John DiMaggio as Leadfoot (also credited as "Target"): The leader of the Autobot Wreckers who transforms into Juan Pablo Montoya's Earnhardt Ganassi Racing No. 42 Target 2011 Chevrolet Impala.
- Keith Szarabajka as Laserbeak: A condor-like Decepticon who is fiercely loyal to Soundwave and frequently changes transformation modes.
- Greg Berg as Igor: A deformed Decepticon who serves as a personal servant to Megatron in his exile.

=== Non-speaking characters ===
- Bumblebee: The Autobot scout who is Sam Witwicky's friend and guardian who transforms into a yellow and black 2011 Chevrolet Camaro.
- Crowbar: The Leader of the Dreads who transforms into a black Police 2011 Chevrolet Suburban.
- Crankcase: A Decepticon Dread who transforms into a black Police 2011 Chevrolet Suburban.
- Hatchet: A quadruped Decepticon Dread who transforms into a black Police 2011 Chevrolet Suburban.
- Driller: A giant worm-like tentacled Decepticon and Shockwave's pet.
- Devcon: A quadruped Decepticon who participates in the Battle of Chicago and transforms into a MAZ-543P 8x8 Soviet missile launcher.
- Topspin: An Autobot Wrecker who transforms into Jimmie Johnson's Hendrick Motorsports No. 48 Lowe's/Kobalt 2011 Chevrolet Impala.

== Production ==
=== Development ===
You just learn a lot more about the hierarchy, and there's more about the history of what they had in Cybertron. Leonard Nimoy plays a great role.

— Michael Bay, on developing Sentinel Prime's character

Before the release of Transformers (2007), Paramount Pictures began developing two sequels. As a preemptive measure before the release of Revenge of the Fallen, Michael Lucchi and Paramount announced on March 16, 2009, that a third film would be released on July 1, 2011, which earned a surprised response from director Michael Bay: "I said I was taking off a year from Transformers. Paramount made a mistake in dating Transformers 3—they asked me on the phone—I said yes to July 1—but for 2012—whoops! Not 2011! That would mean I would have to start prep in September. No way. My brain needs a break from fighting robots." Screenwriters Roberto Orci and Alex Kurtzman, who had worked on the first two Transformers films, declined to return for the third film, with Kurtzman declaring that "the franchise is so wonderful that it deserves to be fresh, all the time. We just felt like we'd given it a lot and didn't have an insight for where to go with it next". Revenge of the Fallen's co-writer Ehren Kruger became the only screenwriter for Dark of the Moon. Kruger had frequent meetings with Industrial Light & Magic's (ILM) visual effects producers, who suggested plot points such as the scenes in Chernobyl. Additionally writer Jenni Konner was brought on to help punch up the script, fleshing out the female characters, and adding humorous jokes.

On October 1, 2009, Bay revealed that Dark of the Moon had already gone into pre-production and its planned release returned to its originally intended date from 2012 to July 1, 2011. Due to the revived interest in 3D filming technology brought on by the success of Avatar, talks between Paramount, ILM, and Bay had considered the possibility of the next Transformers film being filmed in 3D, and testing was performed to bring the technology into Bay's work. Bay originally was not much interested in the format as he felt it did not fit his "aggressive style" of filmmaking, but he was convinced after talks with Avatar director James Cameron, who even offered the technical crew from that film. Cameron reportedly told Bay about 3D, "You gotta look at it as a toy, it's another fun tool to help get emotion and character and create an experience." Bay was reluctant to shoot with 3D cameras since in test he found them to be too cumbersome for his filming style, but he did not want to implement the technology in post-production either since he was not pleased with the results. In addition to using the 3D Fusion camera rigs developed by Cameron's team, Bay and the team spent nine months developing a more portable 3D camera that could be brought into location.

In a hidden extra for the Blu-ray version of Revenge of the Fallen, Bay expressed his intention to make Transformers 3 not necessarily larger than Revenge of the Fallen, but deeper into the mythology, for it to get more character development and for it to be darker and more serious. Unicron is briefly shown in a secret Transformers 3 preview feature in the Revenge of the Fallen Blu-ray disc. Ultimately, the producers decided to forgo a plot involving the planet-eating Transformer, and no further comments were ever made on the subject. Having been called Transformers 3 up to that point, the film's final title was officially revealed to be Dark of the Moon in October 2010. After Revenge of the Fallen was almost universally panned by critics and audiences, Bay acknowledged the general flaws of the script, having blamed the 2007-08 Writers strike before the film for many problems. Bay also said the film will get rid of the "dorky comedy" from the last film. On March 19, 2010, the script was said to be completed.

=== Casting ===
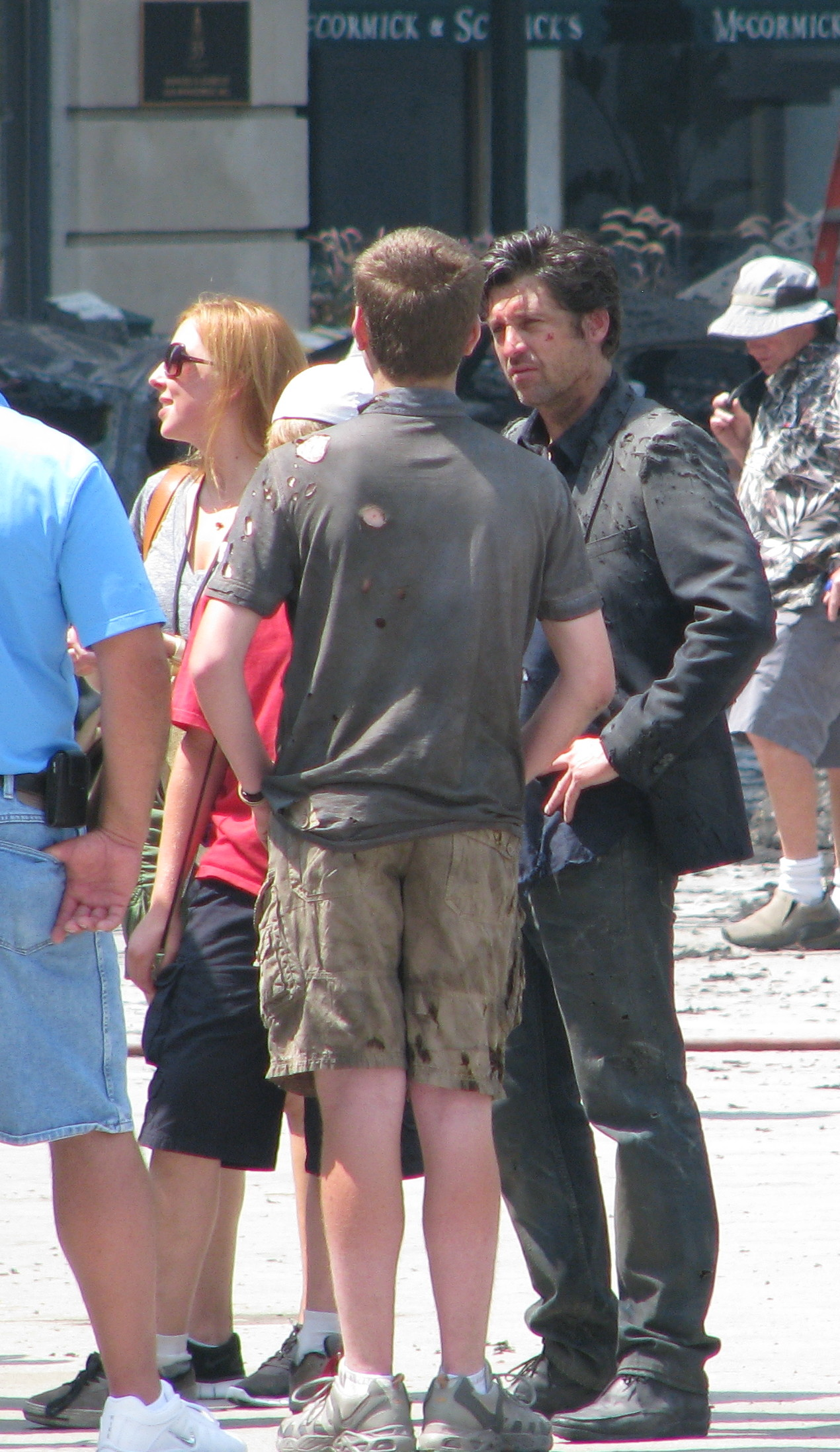
Dempsey on the set of Transformers: Dark of the Moon in 2010

Megan Fox was originally attached to the film, and Patrick Dempsey's role as Dylan Gould was to be the employer of Fox's character, Mikaela Banes. According to various published sources, Fox's absence from the film was due to executive producer Steven Spielberg ultimately choosing not to renew her role in light of her comparing Bay and his work ethic to Adolf Hitler, although representatives for the actress said that it was her decision to leave the film franchise. Bay later claimed that executive producer Steven Spielberg told him to fire Fox, a claim that Spielberg denied. "I wasn't hurt", Bay stated, "because I know that's just Megan. Megan loves to get a response. And she does it in kind of the wrong way. I'm sorry, Megan. I'm sorry I made you work twelve hours. I'm sorry that I'm making you show up on time. Movies are not always warm and fuzzy."

With Fox not reprising her role, Rosie Huntington-Whiteley was chosen to play Sam's new girlfriend. Ramón Rodríguez was initially planned to be in the film, in a role bigger than the one he had in Revenge of the Fallen, but he was dropped during early production. A few well-known actors such as John Malkovich and Frances McDormand were also selected for roles in the film. Malkovich explains: "I play a guy called Bruce Brazos, who's just a loudmouth, kind of business man who's Shia's character's boss. Who's just a jerk, and a kind of a loud one. But a fun character. Nice. It was fun. Very, very enjoyable, just with Shia, Rosie a little bit, and with John Turturro. So, for me, it was a blast." Another well-known actor, Ken Jeong, was cast as an eccentric co-worker and stalker. Jeong described the film, "Yeah, it's a small role in Transformers, but yeah. I had an out-of-body experience working on that one because I just couldn't believe I was there. Still, that was not a thing where oh, I'm going to be a part of a blockbuster franchise like Transformers 3 or even now Hangover 2 for that matter. So I can't believe I'm a part of these franchises in any way. It was amazing. Michael Bay is brilliant and it'll blow your mind."

For the role of Decepticon scientist Shockwave, veteran Transformers voice actor Corey Burton was originally approached to voice the character after previously doing so in the original television series and Transformers: Animated. Burton declined the offer, citing his work schedule and disinterest in being involved in a blockbuster franchise. David Warner (Burton's influence on his Shockwave voice) was briefly considered, but the role was ultimately given to Frank Welker, adding to his already long list of Transformers characters.

=== Themes and inspirations ===
Skids and Mudflap were omitted from Dark of the Moon in response to Revenge of the Fallen's negative reception and the characters' "dorky comedy", which Bay realized that they formed "a final crescendo". Despite fan rumors that Skids and Mudflap would appear in the film, Bay made a public $25,000 "bet" that the characters would not be seen in Dark of the Moon. They had a brief cameo in the N.E.S.T headquarters in their vehicle modes in the film.

Bay acknowledged that Revenge of the Fallen was "disappointing to the fans" and said that he "doesn't want the third one to suck". Bay said that he wanted Dark of the Moon's final battle to be more geographic and feature a "small group of heroes" like Ridley Scott's war–drama Black Hawk Down, Joe Dante's science fiction Small Soldiers and Hasbro's G.I. Joe: The Rise of Cobra. Bay also decided to include Shockwave because he considers the character "bad" and "He's got a much bigger gun [than Megatron and is] a little bit more vicious." According to The A.V. Club, the film had several minor story inspirations from the 1980s cartoon The Transformers, including the usage of a Space Bridge, and the "kicking the Autobots out".

Similar to the previous two installments, the film was told in the human point-of-view to engage the audience. Bay wanted Sam to have a girlfriend like in the first two films. Actor Shia LaBeouf said that Sam and Mikaela had become "one character" and, although he would "miss" Megan Fox, with this change "you have discovery again from a new perspective." LaBeouf also stated that the additions of Huntington-Whiteley and new characters allows Dark of the Moon to keep the "magic" of the first film.

Dark of the Moon also had numerous Star Trek references, partly because scriptwriter Ehren Kruger was a "big Star Trek geek", but also as a nod to the fact that new character Sentinel Prime was voiced by Leonard Nimoy, who originated the iconic role of Spock on Star Trek and voiced Galvatron in The Transformers: The Movie. The first Star Trek reference is when refugee robots Brains and Wheelie, who live in Sam and Carly's apartment complex, are watching TOS episode "Amok Time"; Wheelie comments "I've seen this one. It's the one where Spock goes nuts." The second reference is when Sam meets his girlfriend, Carly Spencer at work, and is being introduced to Carly's employer, Dylan Gould, Sam marvels at their workplace: "It's a beautiful building you guys have. Like the Starship Enterprise in here." The third reference is when Bumblebee says goodbye to Sam at Cape Canaveral: the words "my friend" are sampled from Spock in Star Trek II: The Wrath of Khan ("You are ... my friend. I am and always shall be yours."). The fourth and final reference is when Sentinel Prime activates the Control Pillar, quoting Spock's maxim in Star Trek II and Star Trek III: The Search for Spock, "The needs of the many outweigh the needs of the few".

=== Filming ===
Explosions on Wacker Drive in Chicago for Transformers: Dark of the Moon filming on location

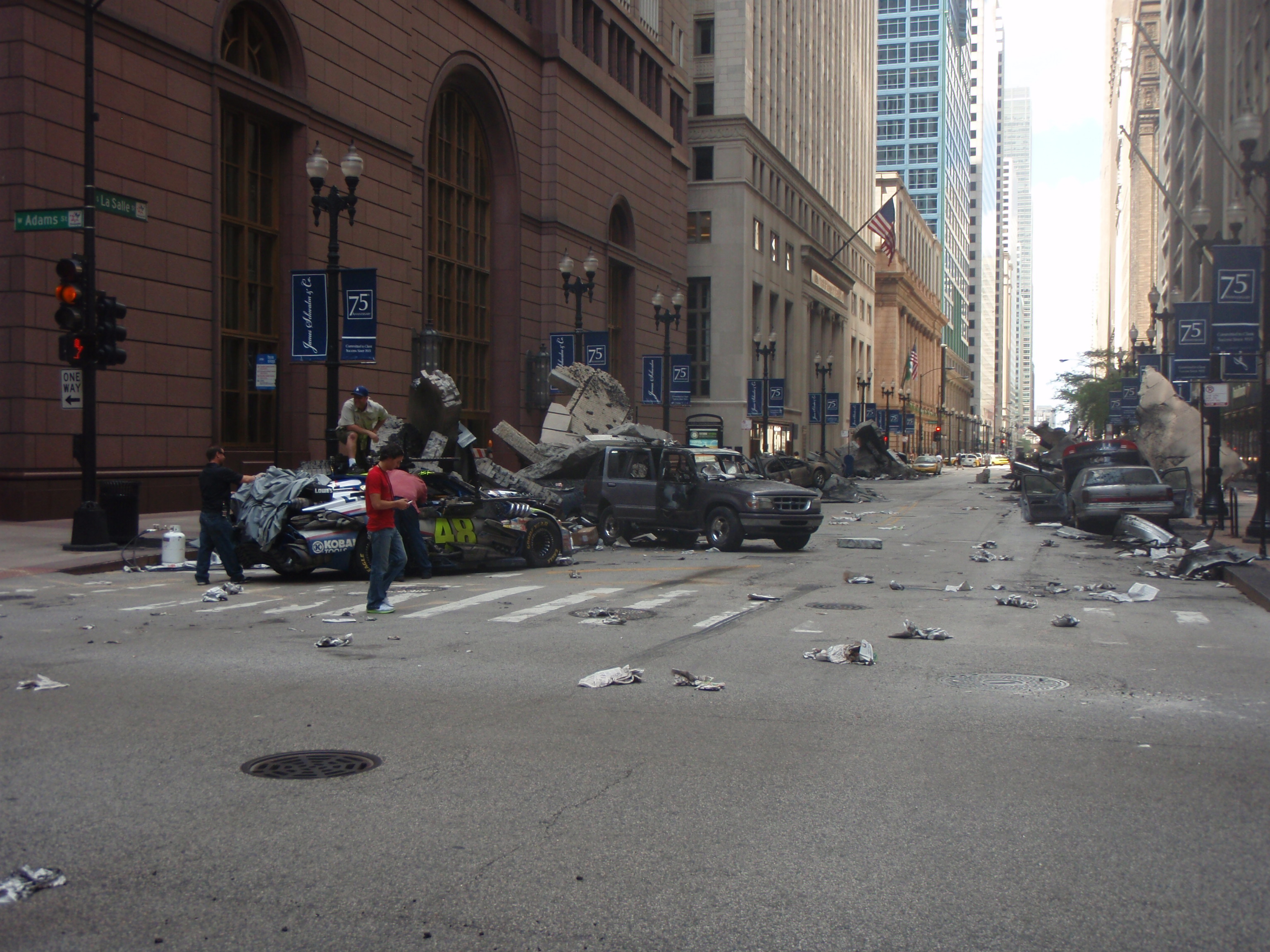
The shooting of Transformers 3 in Chicago in July 2010, in the foreground the Autobot wrecker Topspin as a heavily armed Chevrolet Impala.

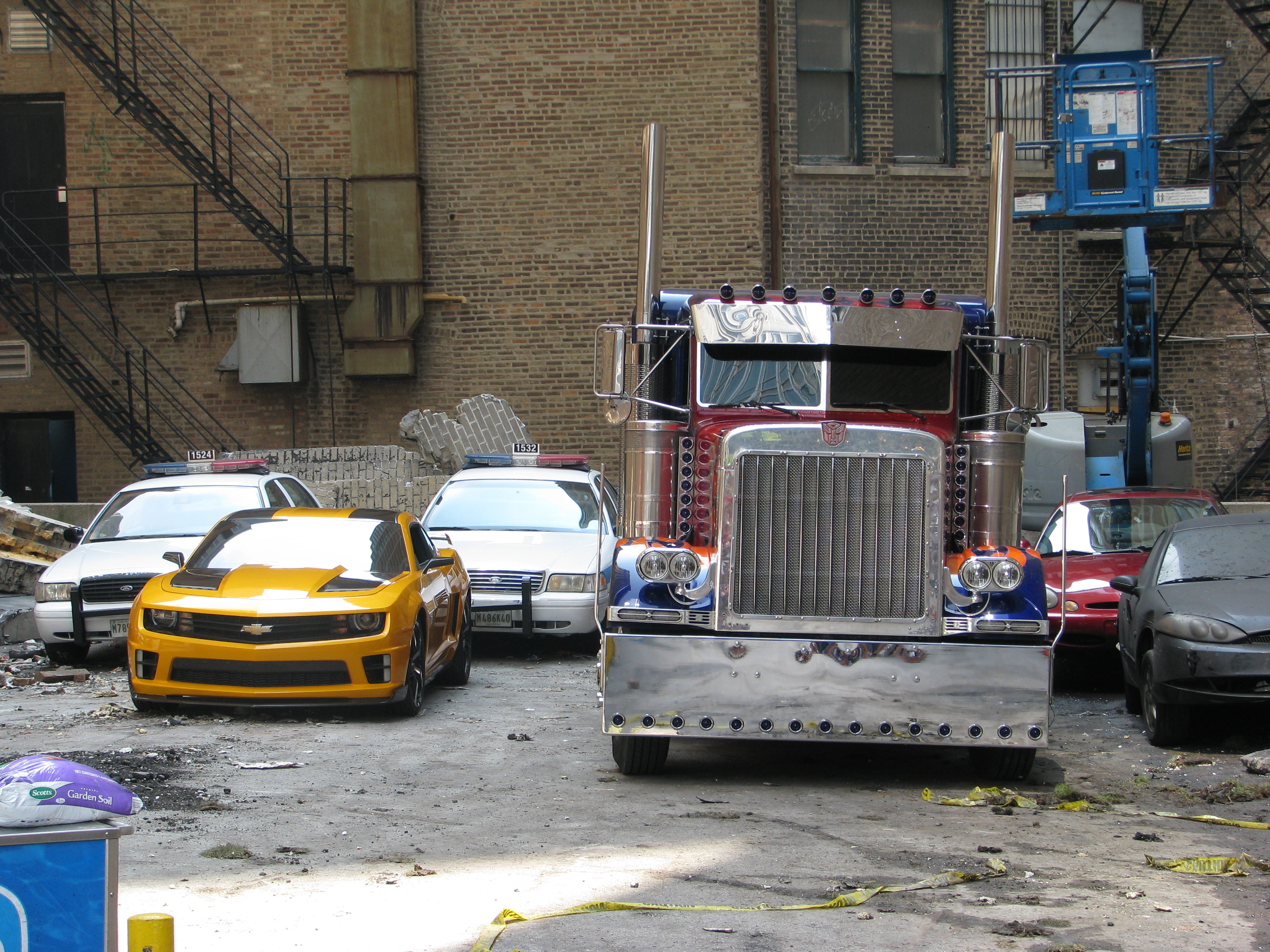
Vehicles used on the set of Transformers: Dark of the Moon

Its production cost was reported $195 million, with the cost of the 3D filming accounting at $30 million of the budget. Preparation for filming began on April 7, 2010, in Northwest Indiana, specifically around Gary, which played Ukraine in the film. Principal photography commenced on May 18, 2010, with shooting locations including Chicago, Florida, and Moscow. The first six weeks were spent in Los Angeles: locations included Sherman Oaks, Fourth Avenue, and 5. Main. The next four weeks were spent in Chicago. Locations filmed in Chicago included LaSalle Street, Michigan Avenue, Bacino's of Lincoln Park at 2204 North Lincoln Avenue and areas surrounding the Willis Tower. The scenes set in Michigan Ave featured a substantial amount of pyrotechnics and stunt work. Filming in Detroit was planned to take place in August but the Chicago shoot was extended until September 1. In late September, the production moved to NASA's Kennedy Space Center in Florida, just before the launch of Space Shuttle mission STS-133. Scenes were filmed at Launch Pad 39A, the Vehicle Assembly Building and the Orbiter Processing Facility.

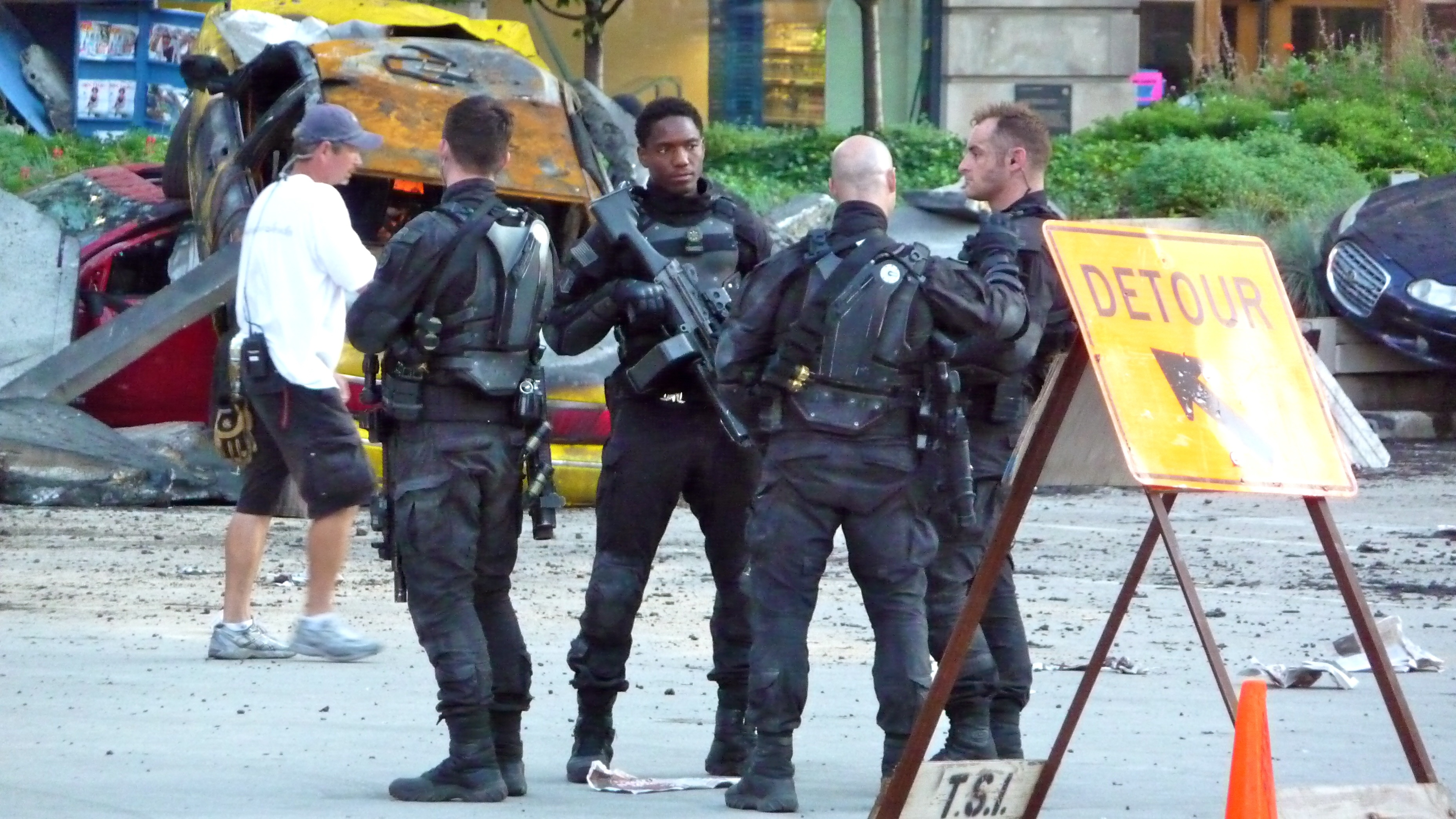
Actors on a Transformers: Dark of the Moon set in July 2010

While filming in Washington, D.C., the crew shot on the National Mall and Bay said that there would be a car race on the location. Two further locations announced were the Milwaukee Art Museum and the former Tower Automotive complex on Milwaukee's north side, then under redevelopment for mixed use also the city's equipment yard. Filming was scheduled to take place there after work was done in Chicago. On September 23, scenes were filmed at the former city hall in Detroit. On October 16, a flashback scene that takes place in the later 1960s was shot at the Johnson Space Center in Houston, using extras with period fashion and hairstyles. A day of shooting was also spent at the Angkor Wat temple complex in Cambodia. Other planned filming locations included Africa and China. Though about 70% of the film's live-action footage was shot in 3D using Arri Alexa and Sony F35 cameras, more than half of the film still had to be converted into 3D in post production to fix technical flaws that 3D filming produces. Other footage that needed to be converted into 3D in post production was either completely computer-generated imagery (CGI) or shot in the anamorphic format on 35 mm film. 35 mm film was used for scenes filmed in slow motion and scenes such as closeups of faces or shots of the sky that required higher image quality than the HD digital 3D cameras could provide. 35 mm cameras were also used for scenes where the 3D cameras proved to be too heavy, or were subject to strobing or electrical damage from dust. Principal photography officially concluded on November 9, 2010.

Dark of the Moon was found to carry recycled footage from an earlier film directed by Michael Bay—The Island (2005). Bay recycled the same footage from his film Pearl Harbor (2001) in the first Transformers film.

=== Accidents ===
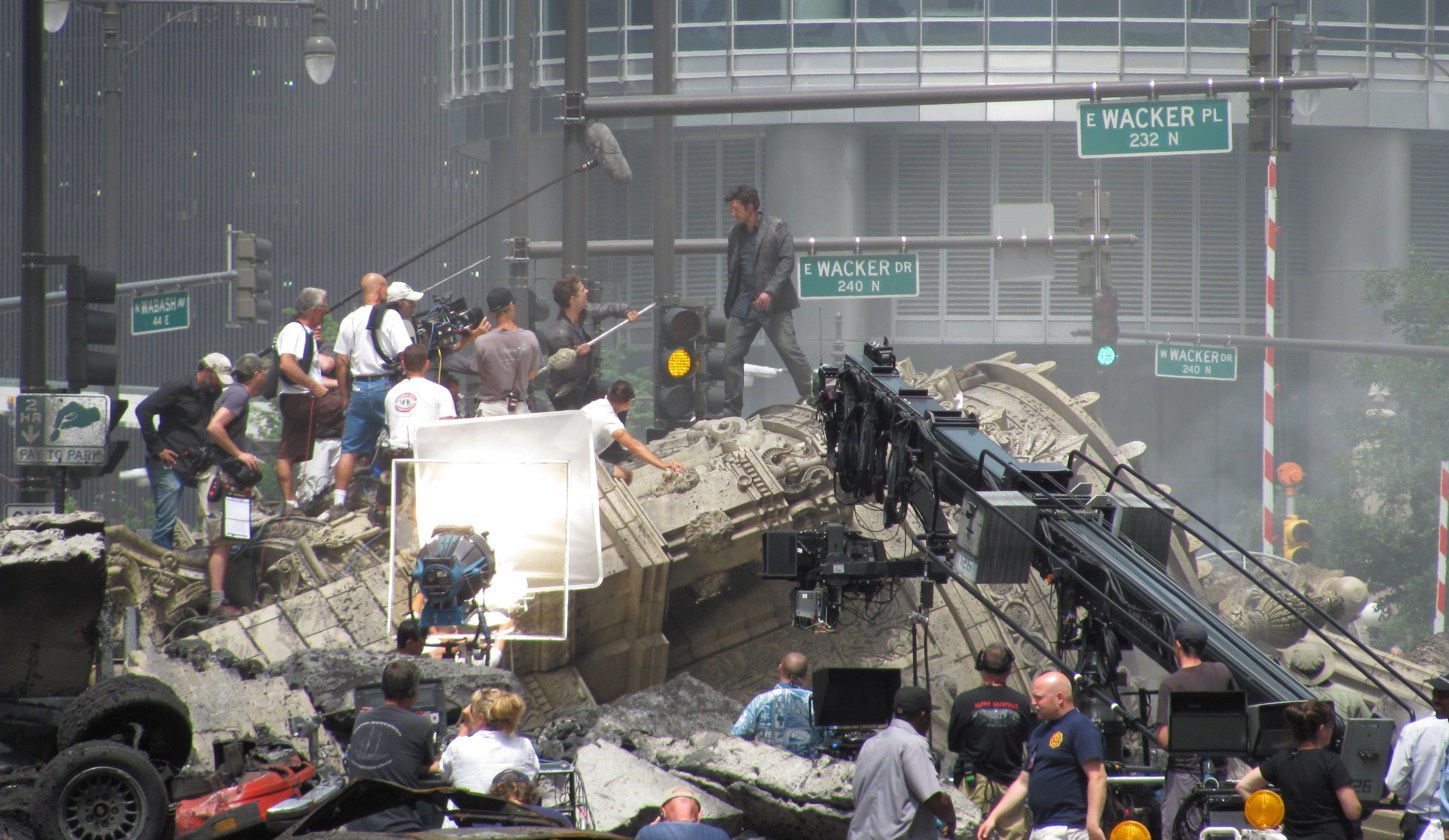
Shooting of the duel between Sam Witwicky (Shia LaBeouf) and Dylan Gould (Patrick Dempsey) in Chicago.

Filming was delayed on September 2, 2010, when an extra was seriously injured during a stunt in Hammond, Indiana. Due to a failed weld, a steel cable snapped from a car being towed and hit the extra's car, damaging her skull. The extra, identified as Gabriela Cedillo, had to undergo brain surgery. The injury has left her permanently brain-damaged, paralyzed on her left side and her left eye stitched shut. Paramount admitted responsibility for the accident and covered all of Cedillo's medical costs. Nevertheless, Cedillo's family filed a lawsuit on October 5, citing seven counts of negligence against Paramount, and several other defendants (not including Bay), with total damages sought in excess of $350,000. Cedillo's attorney, Todd Smith, said, "This was an attractive 24-year-old girl who had dreams and aspirations involving acting, and this kind of injury may well have a serious impact on her dreams." The filed complaint reads that "Cedillo has endured and will in the future endure pain and suffering; has become disfigured and disabled; has suffered a loss of the enjoyment of a normal life; has been damaged in her capacity to earn a living; has incurred and will in the future incur expenses for medical services, all of which are permanent in nature." In response to the suit, Paramount released the following statement: "We are all terribly sorry that this accident occurred. Our thoughts, prayers and best wishes are with Gabriela, her family and loved ones. The production will continue to provide all the help we can to Gabriela and her family during this difficult time." In May 2012, it was revealed that an $18 million settlement had been reached between Paramount and the Cedillo family. Indiana OSHA's investigation was criticised.

A second accident occurred on October 11, 2010, in Washington, D.C. While filming a pursuit scene at 3rd Street and Maryland Avenue, SW, a Metropolitan Police K9 unit SUV was accidentally rammed by the Camaro that portrays Bumblebee in the film. The area had been closed off by the Washington, D.C., police, and it is unclear why the SUV was there. Both drivers were uninjured, but the Camaro was severely damaged. Reports indicate that the K9 unit was heading to a report of a bomb threat as part of a Bomb Squad response, but was not using the same radio frequency as the units guarding the filming and did not realize it had gone the wrong way until it collided with the Bumblebee Camaro. Many fans who witnessed the crash were horrified at the damage the Bumblebee Camaro suffered, and cast and crew members reacted quickly to cover up the damaged Camaro and secure the scene.

=== Visual effects ===
As with the previous Transformers installments, Industrial Light & Magic (ILM) was the main CGI visual effects company for Dark of the Moon. ILM had been working on the pre-visualization for six months before principal photography began, resulting in 20 minutes of footage. Digital Domain also rendered 350 CGI shots, including the characters Laserbeak, Brains, Wheelie, and the Decepticon protoforms concealed on the Moon, the space bridge, and a skydiving sequence.

External audio
- Industrial Light & Magic's interview for the effects of the film.
- Listen to the Interview

ILM's visual effects supervisor Scott Farrar said that "not only were the film's effects ambitious, they also had to be designed for 3D", and explained the company's solutions for the new perspective: "We did make sure things are as bright as possible; Michael called up theatre owners to make sure they keep the lamps bright in the theatres ... make everything a little sharper, because we know that through the steps, no matter what, when you get to the final screening things tend to go less sharp." On the last weekend of ILM's work on Dark of the Moon, the company's entire render farm was being used for the film, giving ILM more than 200,000 hours of rendering power a day—or equivalent to 22.8 years of rendering time in 24 hours. Farrar embraced the detail in creating giant robots for 3D, making sure that in close-ups of the Transformers' faces "you see all the details in the nooks and crannies of these pieces. It's totally unlike a plain surface subject like a human head or an animated head." The supervisor said that Bay's style of cinematography helped integrate the robots into the scenes, as "Michael is keen on having foreground/midground/background depth in his shots, even in normal live-action shots. He'll say, 'Put some stuff hanging here!' It could be women's stockings or forks and knives dangling from a string out of focus—it doesn't matter, but it gives you depth, and focus depth, and makes it more interesting."

Considerable digital animation was required for the elaborate Driller as it comprised over 70,000 parts, significantly more than Optimus Prime's 10,000 parts.

The most complicated effects involved the "Driller", a giant snake-like creature with an eel-like body and spinning rotator blades, knives and teeth. In Revenge of the Fallen, it took 72 hours per frame to fully render Devastator for the IMAX format, which is approximately a frame amount of 4,000. For the Driller, which required the entire render farm, it was up to 122 hours per frame. The most complex scene involved the Driller destroying a computer-generated skyscraper, which took 288 hours per frame. For said sequence, ILM relied on its internal proprietary physics simulation engine to depict the destruction of the building, which included breaking concrete floors and walls, windows, columns and pieces of office furnishings. ILM digital production supervisor Nigel Sumner explained: "We did a lot of tests early on to figure out how to break the building apart, exploring a lot of the procedural options. A building that's 70 feet tall—to go in and hand-score the geometry so when it fractures or falls apart—would be a time-consuming, laborious process. The floor of a building may be made of concrete. How does concrete fracture when it tears apart? The pillars would be made of a similar material but made of rebar or other engineering components. We'd look at how a building would blow apart and then choose the best tool to help achieve the properties of that during a simulation."

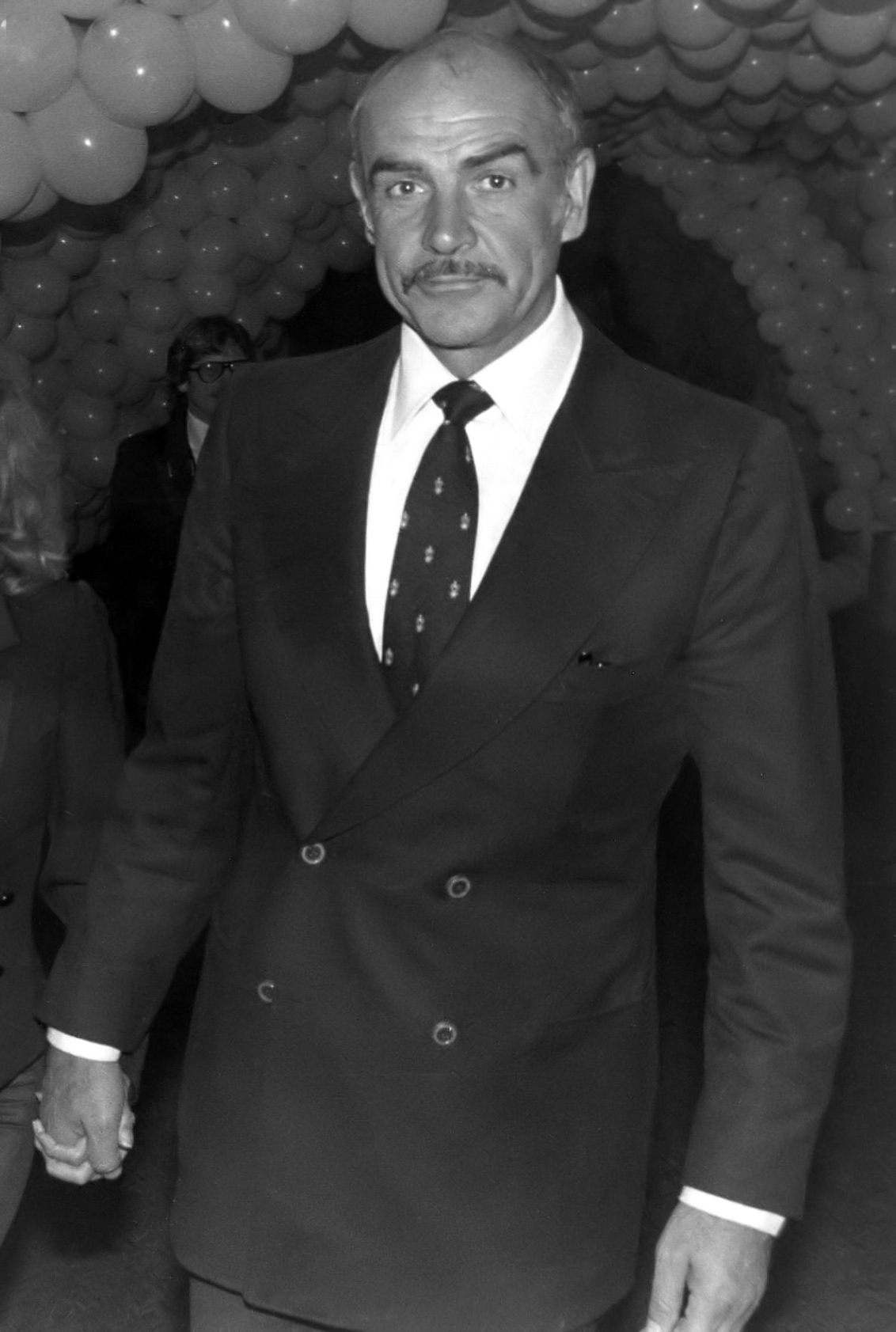
Sentinel Prime (left) was modelled after Actor Sean Connery (right).

The scenes in Chicago were mostly shot on location, as Bay believed the plates had to really be shot in the real city. Farrar was always fascinated with the idea of shooting on location and then blending the film with computer-generated imagery. He said: "We try and shoot everything real. You may have seen some films recently where the entire city has been destroyed and it's entirely CGI. Well, for a Transformers film, it's different because we actually went to Chicago. If you start with the real thing, you have a lot more to work with to make it look real. So for a couple of months there, I was in a helicopter shooting aerial plates of the real buildings. And we'd add destruction to all the backgrounds – smoke, fire, debris, fighter planes, war, battles, torn up streets – to real cityscapes." Four ILM employees also traveled to Chicago and photographed buildings from top to bottom at six different times of the day in order to create a digital model of the city to be used in certain scenes. ILM's crew designed many major action scenes, with many of the Chicago battle concepts coming from the helicopter shooting of the aerial plates.

Animator Scott Benza said Sentinel Prime had a face "more human-like than any of the other robots", with a more complex frame and "a greater number of plates" so it could be more expressive. ILM had based most of Sentinel Prime's features on Sean Connery, and after Leonard Nimoy was cast to voice the role, the effects were altered to incorporate Nimoy's acting as well. Every robot would take approximately 30 weeks to build visually. Originally, the fight between Sentinel Prime, Optimus Prime, and Megatron was considered to be on water in the Chicago River, but the budget was cut and ILM realized that they would not want to present that version of the final battle to Bay, so they decided to have the battle take place on the bridge over the river. For a sequence where Bumblebee catches Sam and Lennox while transforming in mid-air, a digital double of Shia LaBeouf was combined with footage of the actor in high speed so that the effects team could time it for slow-motion.

Since Bay shoots all his films in anamorphic format, Dark of the Moon's representation would be "squeezed in" to distort the image, and ILM would add in the robots and "un-distort" the image. The ample variety of filming formats used—single camera, 3D stereo rigs with two cameras, anamorphic and spherical lenses—proved a challenge, especially as ILM had a deadline to deliver the 3D plates to the companies responsible for the 3D conversion. ILM made 600 3D shots, and Digital Domain had under 200, while Legend3D, the lead 3D conversion company of the film, completed 78 minutes of work on the film and finalized the work of approximately 40 minutes of challenging non-visual effects and 38 minutes of visual effects shots.

== Music ==
Steve Jablonsky – "It's Our Fight"
A 27 second sample of Steve Jablonsky's "It's Our Fight". The climax is played, and a unique bass drum is used in the process.

Composer Steve Jablonsky, who had before collaborated with Bay on The Island and the first two Transformers films, returned to compose the Dark of the Moon score. Jablonsky's musical score was lauded by critics and fans. The score was released on June 24, 2011, five days before the actual release of the film.

Although a bit more score-heavy this time around, the soundtrack is certainly featured and we not only rejoin characters we have come to know, but some familiar artists who are back again as well.

— Allison Loring, reviewing the film's soundtrack

The album was originally set for release on June 28, 2011, but Amazon.com listed the album as unavailable while the album was still being listed for release during the week of the film's global release. It was available for download on Amazon on June 30, 2011, and the score currently features 17 pre-recorded tracks that are featured in the final film. The score's length is approximately 59:47. The album for the film was released on June 14, 2011. It consists of singles produced by different artists and bands, and rock tracks. American rock band Linkin Park composed the lead single for the film, "Iridescent", as they did with the first two films: "What I've Done" was used in the 2007 film and they composed "New Divide" for the 2009 film. The music video for "Iridescent" was directed by Joe Hahn. Two other singles were released specifically for the soundtrack, "Monster" by Paramore and "All That You Are" by the Goo Goo Dolls. Several other unreleased songs make their debut on the album, including "The Pessimist" by Stone Sour and "The Bottom" by Staind. My Chemical Romance's song "The Only Hope for Me Is You" also appeared and can also be found on their fourth studio album Danger Days: The True Lives of the Fabulous Killjoys (2010) and on the soundtrack. The song was not exclusively for the movie and was featured in the credits. The Black Veil Brides' song "Set the World on Fire" is also included.

== Marketing ==
An advertisement for the film on a bus in Hong Kong

Most of the characters returned for Hasbro's new toyline, which was released on May 16, 2011. In October 2010, Entertainment Tonight previewed the behind-the-scenes filming in Chicago. A two-minute teaser trailer was announced on November 27, and was posted to the Internet on December 9, 2010. A 30-second television advertisement for the film aired during Super Bowl XLV on Fox TV channel on February 6, 2011. The first full theatrical trailer was released on April 28, 2011. The very first video clip was released on May 18. A second clip was released the next day on May 19. The North American promotional costs came to approximately $75 million.

=== Novelizations ===
In May 2011, the novelization, junior novel, and graphic novel of Transformers: Dark of the Moon were released. Both the novel and the graphic novel featured Skids and Mudflap as supporting characters, but the characters were missing from the junior novel. The graphic novel made reference to several Autobots from the IDW Publishing tie-in comics who died in the stories between Revenge of the Fallen and Dark of the Moon. Another novel, written by Peter David, was published on May 24, 2011, and was released only paperback. Though it is slightly different from the film, the novel still pertains to the topic and synopsis of the film it is based on in the outcome of the final battle. The novel features about 400 pages and is published by Del Rey Books. Its synopsis is:

All humankind was watching that day in 1969. And yet only a handful knew the real mission behind America's triumph in the space race: to explore the alien ship that has crashed on the far side of the moon. Decades later, scientists are still struggling to understand the technology found on board—though with the treacherous Decepticons after it, a powerful force must be at stake. The only hope of averting a crisis is to reawaken Sentinel Prime, the long-lost leader of the Autobots—but who knows what else remains in the shadows, hidden from man and machine?

=== Video game ===
On June 14, 2011, Activision published a video game based on the film for Xbox 360, PlayStation 3, Wii, Nintendo 3DS and Nintendo DS. The versions for Nintendo's consoles were developed by Behaviour Interactive, while the versions for the rest of the consoles were developed by High Moon Studios, who had previously developed Transformers: War for Cybertron. Electronic Arts released the game Transformers: Dark of the Moon on June 28, 2011, for Nokia Symbian smartphones, Apple products iPod Touch, iPhones, and iPad and Research In Motion's BlackBerry devices.

== Release ==
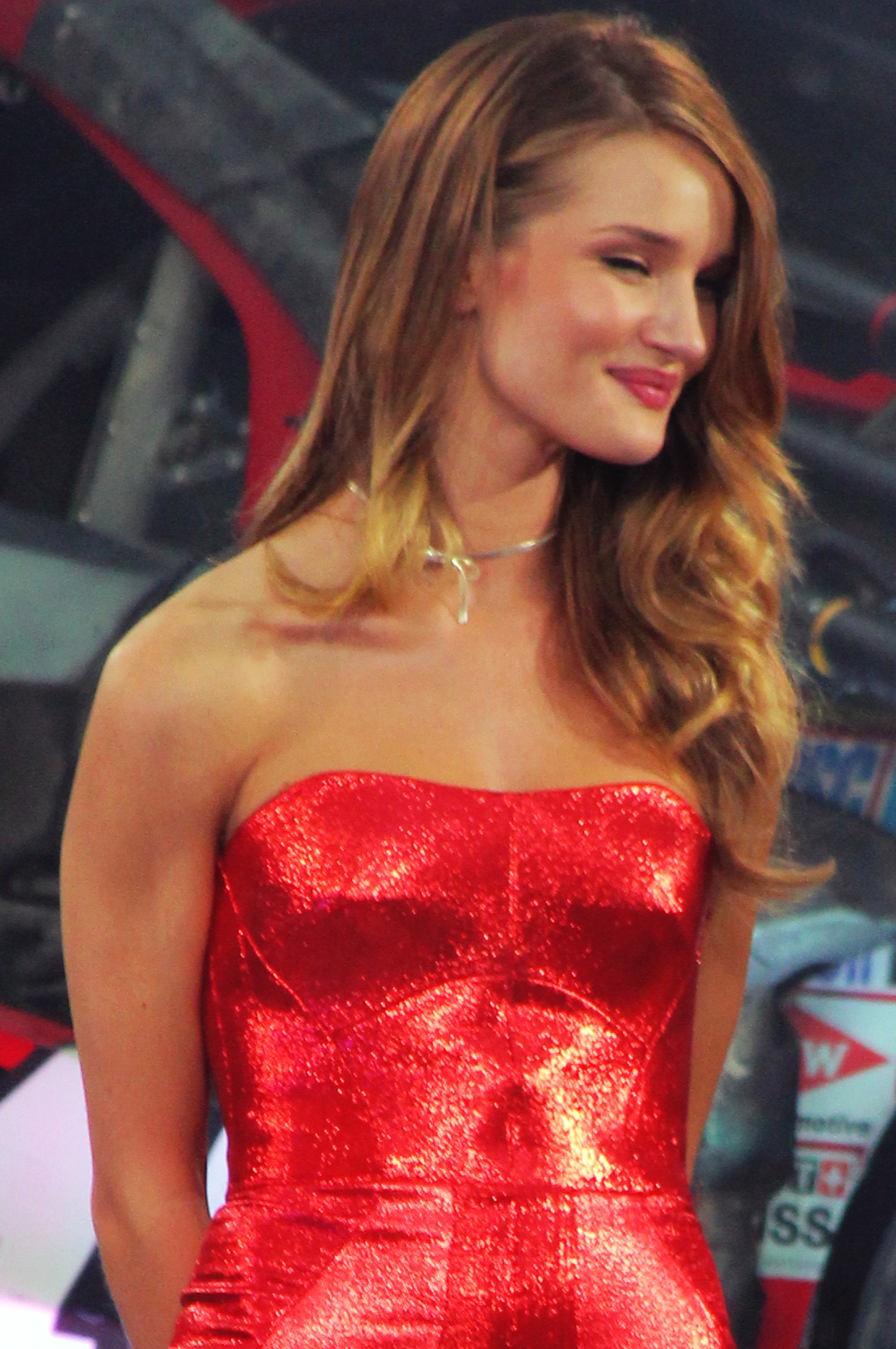
Rosie Huntington-Whiteley at the film's premiere

=== Theatrical ===
Transformers: Dark of the Moon first premiered at the Moscow International Film Festival on June 23, 2011. Linkin Park performed a special outdoor concert in Red Square in Moscow on the same night in celebration of the event. Initially scheduled to be released on July 1, 2011, the release was brought forward to June 29, 2011. It was announced in November 2010 that unlike Transformers: Revenge of the Fallen, no scenes in the film were shot with IMAX 3-D cameras.

=== Home media ===
During Hasbro Investor Day, it was announced that the DVD and Blu-ray Disc would be released in the fourth quarter of 2011. The NTSC home release for the film was released on September 30, 2011, with a Blu-ray 3D version of the film slated for release in "the coming months". The first home release was criticized for the lack of bonus features.

A Walmart exclusive edition of Transformers: Dark of the Moon also was released on September 30, 2011. The PAL DVD and Blu-ray Discs of Transformers: Dark of the Moon were released on November 28, 2011.

In North America, it sold 716,218 DVD units (equivalent of $13,565,169) in its first week, topping the weekly DVD chart. As of February 26, 2012, it has sold 2,829,285 DVD units (equivalent of $48,058,979). It also topped the Blu-ray charts on the same week and it has sold 2,381,657 Blu-ray units (earning $50,934,911) by October 23, 2011. The Blu-ray 3D release of the film was released on January 31, 2012, in NTSC regions and on February 13, 2012, in PAL regions.

Transformers: Dark of the Moon was released on 4K UHD Blu-ray on October 30, 2017, in PAL regions and December 5, 2017, in NTSC regions.

The film grossed $113.9 million in home sales.

== Reception ==
=== Box office ===
==== Worldwide ====
Transformers: Dark of the Moon had grossed $352.3 million in North America, and $771.4 million in other territories, for a worldwide total of $1.123 billion. It was the fifth highest-grossing film of all time and the second-highest-grossing film of 2011. On August 3, 2011, the film crossed the $1 billion mark, making it the second Paramount film to do so, along with Titanic. Its worldwide opening weekend ($382.4 million) is the fourth-largest ever and the largest for Paramount It set an IMAX worldwide opening-weekend record with $23.1 million (first surpassed by Deathly Hallows – Part 2). It reached $400 million (6 days), $500 million (9 days), $600 million (12 days) and $700 million (16 days) in record time, but lost all records to Deathly Hallows – Part 2.

==== North America ====
The film opened in 4,088 theaters including a then-record total of 2,789 3-D locations. It made $5.5 million during Tuesday 9 p.m. showings, $8 million during midnight showings and $37.7 million on its opening day (Wednesday)—including Tuesday showings. This was the sixth-best opening Wednesday. However, all these figures were lower than Revenge of the Fallen. On Thursday, it earned $21.5 million, falling 43%, an improvement from its predecessor's Wednesday-to-Thursday decline. It grossed $33.0 million on Friday totaling $97.8 million. Its 3-D share accounted for 60% of its gross, which was atypical due to the downturn in 3D attendance in North America. For its three-day opening weekend (Friday-to-Sunday), it grossed $97.9 million, topping the box office ahead of Cars 2. It achieved the third-largest opening weekend of 2011, the fourth-largest opening weekend in July, the fifth-largest opening weekend for a film not released on Friday and the second-largest five-day gross for a film opening on Wednesday. It set records for the 3-day ($97.9 million) and 4-day ($115.9 million) Independence Day weekend, surpassing Spider-Man 2's record in both cases ($88.2 million and $115.8 million, respectively) until both records were broken with the release of Minions: The Rise of Gru in 2022. It retained first place on its second weekend, dropping 52% to $47.1 million. Closing on October 13, 2011, with $352.4 million, it is the second-highest-grossing film of 2011 and the second-highest-grossing film in the franchise.

==== Outside North America ====
The film grossed $32.5 million on its opening day, pacing 38% ahead of its predecessor. Including some early Tuesday previews, it earned $36.6 million in one-and-a-half days, and by Thursday its international total reached $66 million. By the end of its first weekend, it had earned $219.8 million, which stands as the fifth-largest opening weekend of all time overseas and the largest for Paramount. Its foreign launch was 57% ahead of that of Revenge of the Fallen ($139.6 million). 70% of its grosses came from 3-D (a higher 3-D share than Pirates 4's 66%). Don Harris, general manager of distribution for Paramount, commented on the results of Dark of the Moon: "If we hadn't chosen to debut the movie later in Japan and China, we probably would have had the all-time record." The film topped the box office outside North America for two weekends in a row.

In China, its highest-grossing market after North America, the film set records for an opening day with $15.9 million, a single day with $17.4 million (overtaken by Journey to the West: Conquering the Demons) and an opening weekend with $46.8 million ($62.7 million with previews). The latter was taken from Avatar ($42.0 million). The opening weekend record, when including previews, was surpassed by Titanic 3D ($74.2 million). Dark of the Moon ended its run with $167.95 million, marking the second-highest-grossing film of 2011 (after Harry Potter and the Deathly Hallows – Part 2). Besides China, it broke the opening-day record in Russia and South Korea; the single-day record in Hong Kong; and the opening-weekend record in South Korea, Hong Kong, Malaysia, Taiwan, Thailand, Singapore, the UAE, the Philippines and Peru (the last three records were surpassed by The Avengers). Following China in total earnings were South Korea ($69.1 million) and Japan ($54.2 million).

=== Critical response ===
On Rotten Tomatoes, the film has an approval rating of 35% based on reviews from 259 critics and an average rating of 5/10. The site's critical consensus reads, "Its special effects—and 3D shots—are undeniably impressive, but they aren't enough to fill up its loud, bloated running time, or mask its thin, indifferent script." On Metacritic, the film has a score of 42 out of 100 based on 37 critics, indicating "mixed or average reviews". Audiences polled by CinemaScore gave the film an average grade of "A" on an A+ to F scale.

Roger Ebert gave the film one out of four stars, criticizing its visuals, plot, characters, and dialogue. Richard Roeper likewise panned the film, giving it a D and responded that "rarely has a movie had less of a soul and less interesting characters." A.O. Scott in The New York Times wrote "I can't decide if this movie is so spectacularly, breathtakingly dumb as to induce stupidity in anyone who watches, or so brutally brilliant that it disarms all reason. What's the difference?"

Several critics felt that Shia LaBeouf and Rosie Huntington-Whiteley's performances were ineffective. Peter Travers of Rolling Stone gave the film 0 stars, the same rating that he had given to Revenge of the Fallen, and stated the two actors "couldn't be duller". Tirdad Derakhshani of The Philadelphia Inquirer stated that LaBeouf "plays Witwicky as if he had a ferocious case of attention deficit disorder. After two films, his fidgeting isn't cute anymore." James Berardinelli of ReelViews wrote that LaBeouf "has sunk to greater levels of incompetence here. It's hard to call his posturing and screaming 'acting'." Jason Solomons of The Observer wrote "[W]e're first introduced to [Huntington-Whiteley] via a close-up of her bum, segueing straight from the film's opening sequence and titles on to the pert buttocks and underwear of our heroine", and that her English posh girl accent "renders her practically unintelligible when surrounded by American accents and falling masonry." Much of the criticism towards Rosie Huntington-Whiteley compared her in an unfavorable light to Megan Fox. Lou Lumenick of the New York Post wrote that her "'acting' makes ... Megan Fox look like Meryl Streep in comparison." Huntington-Whitely was later nominated for the Golden Raspberry Award for Worst Supporting Actress for her performance, but lost to David Spade for Jack and Jill.

For good or ill, Bay is the soul of a new machine, the poet of post-human cinema, the CEO of Hollywood's military-entertainment complex.

— Richard Corliss, in his review of the film for Time magazine

Steve Prokopy of Ain't It Cool News found the film to be better than the first two. Jim Vejvoda of IGN gave the film a score of seven out of ten, also stating that it was the best of the franchise. E! Online graded the film a B+ while noting if this film is truly the end of a trilogy, its main antagonists should have played more of a part. Website Daily Bhaskar also praised the film, rating it three and a half out of five stars, citing it as an improvement on the previous film, and writing that it "gives fans something to cheer about."

Many reviews praised the film's special effects and aggressive use of 3-D. After previewing a partial, unfinished cut of the film, Kofi Outlaw of Screen Rant declared that Bay had created the best 3-D experience since James Cameron's Avatar. Neil Schneider of Meant to be Seen, a website focused on stereoscopic 3-D gaming and entertainment, remarked that "while Transformers: Dark of the Moon had the scrapings of a really good story, this 3-D movie was shot with a 2-D script." On the topic of 3-D, Schneider said "Transformers 3 was a mix of native stereoscopic 3-D camera capturing and 2-D/3-D conversion (as a 3-D tool), and most was done very well." He added, "At a minimum, Transformers 3 demonstrates that fast cutting sequences are indeed possible and practical in stereoscopic 3-D. More than that, it was a comfortable experience and helped exemplify great use of stereoscopic 3-D with CGI live-action and CGI digital characters. That said, I think they still could have taken it much further."

Charlie Jane Anders of Jezebel believed that some elements of the film were deliberate self-references to Michael Bay's own sense of under-appreciation after the backlash to the second film: "After a few hours of seeing Shia get dissed, overlooked and mistreated, the message becomes clear: Shia, as always, is a stand-in for Michael Bay. And Bay is showing us just what it felt like to deal with the ocean of Haterade—the snarking, the Razzie Award, the mean reviews—that Revenge of the Fallen unleashed." She went on to say that the film's frequent, often jarring shifts in tone were an intentional endorsement of Michael Bay's own filmmaking style. "Tone is for single-purpose machines. Consistency is for Decepticons. Michael Bay's ideal movie shifts from action movie to teen comedy to political drama with the same well-lubricated ease that his cars become men. By the time you've finished watching, you will speak Michael Bay's cinematic language."

=== Accolades ===
Accolades received by Transformers: Dark of the Moon
Award	Date of ceremony	Category	Recipient(s)	Result	Ref.
Academy Awards	February 26, 2012	Best Sound Editing	Ethan Van der Ryn and Erik Aadahl	Nominated	
Academy Awards	February 26, 2012	Best Sound Mixing	Greg P. Russell, Gary Summers, Jeffrey J. Haboush, and Peter J. Devlin	Nominated	
Academy Awards	February 26, 2012	Best Visual Effects	Scott Farrar, Scott Benza, Matthew Butler, and John Frazier	Nominated	
Alliance of Women Film Journalists Awards	January 10, 2012	Sequel or Remake That Shouldn't Have Been Made	Transformers: Dark of the Moon	Nominated	
Annie Awards	February 4, 2012	Animated Effects in a Live Action Production	Florent Andarra	Won	
BMI Film & TV Awards	May 17, 2012	BMI Film Music Awards	Steve Jablonsky	Won	
British Academy Children's Awards	November 27, 2011	Kid's Vote — Film	Transformers: Dark of the Moon	Nominated	
Empire Awards	March 25, 2012	Best 3D	Transformers: Dark of the Moon	Nominated	
Golden Raspberry Awards	April 1, 2012	Worst Picture	Transformers: Dark of the Moon	Nominated	
Golden Raspberry Awards	April 1, 2012	Worst Director	Michael Bay	Nominated	
Golden Raspberry Awards	April 1, 2012	Worst Supporting Actor	Patrick Dempsey	Nominated	
Golden Raspberry Awards	April 1, 2012	Worst Supporting Actor	Ken Jeong	Nominated	
Golden Raspberry Awards	April 1, 2012	Worst Supporting Actress	Rosie Huntington-Whiteley	Nominated	
Golden Raspberry Awards	April 1, 2012	Worst Screenplay	Ehren Kruger	Nominated	
Golden Raspberry Awards	April 1, 2012	Worst Screen Couple	Shia LaBeouf and Rosie Huntington-Whiteley	Nominated	
Golden Raspberry Awards	April 1, 2012	Worst Screen Ensemble	Transformers: Dark of the Moon	Nominated	
Golden Reel Awards	February 19, 2012	Outstanding Achievement in Sound Editing – Feature Underscore	Transformers: Dark of the Moon	Nominated	
Golden Reel Awards	February 19, 2012	Outstanding Achievement in Sound Editing – Sound Effects and Foley for Feature Film	Transformers: Dark of the Moon	Nominated	
Golden Trailer Awards	June 29, 2011	Summer 2011 Blockbuster	"Alien Secret" (Wild Card)	Won	
Golden Trailer Awards	June 29, 2011	Best Sound Editing	"Alien Secret" (Wild Card)	Nominated	
Golden Trailer Awards	June 29, 2011	Best Summer Blockbuster 2011 TV Spot	"Dark" (Ignition Creative)	Nominated	
Hollywood Film Awards	October 24, 2011	Hollywood Movie Award	Transformers: Dark of the Moon	Nominated	
Hollywood Film Awards	October 24, 2011	Hollywood Visual Effects Award	Scott Farrar	Won	
Hollywood Post Alliance Awards	November 10, 2011	Outstanding Color Grading – Feature Film	Stefan Sonnenfeld	Nominated	
Hollywood Post Alliance Awards	November 10, 2011	Outstanding Compositing – Feature Film	Jeff Sutherland, Jason Billington, Chris Balog, and Ben O'Brien	Won	
People's Choice Awards	January 11, 2012	Favorite Movie	Transformers: Dark of the Moon	Nominated	
People's Choice Awards	January 11, 2012	Favorite Action Movie	Transformers: Dark of the Moon	Nominated	
People's Choice Awards	January 11, 2012	Favorite Action Movie Star	Shia LaBeouf	Nominated	
Satellite Awards	December 18, 2011	Best Visual Effects	Scott Benza, John Frazier, Matthew Butler, and Scott Farrar	Nominated	
Satellite Awards	December 18, 2011	Best Sound	Peter J. Devlin, Ethan Van der Ryn, Erik Aadahl, Gary Summers, Greg P. Russell, and Jeffrey J. Haboush	Nominated	
Saturn Awards	July 26, 2012	Best Special Effects	Scott Benza, John Frazier, Matthew Butler, and Scott Farar	Nominated	
Scream Awards	October 15, 2011	Best Science Fiction Movie	Transformers: Dark of the Moon	Nominated	
Scream Awards	October 15, 2011	Best Cameo	Buzz Aldrin	Nominated	
Scream Awards	October 15, 2011	Holy Sh*t Scene of the Year	"Escape From Collapsing Building"	Nominated	
Scream Awards	October 15, 2011	Best 3D Movie	Transformers: Dark of the Moon	Won	
Scream Awards	October 15, 2011	Best F/X	Transformers: Dark of the Moon	Nominated	
Screen Actors Guild Awards	January 29, 2012	Outstanding Performance by a Stunt Ensemble in a Motion Picture	Transformers: Dark of the Moon	Nominated	
Teen Choice Awards	August 7, 2011	Choice Summer Movie	Transformers: Dark of the Moon	Nominated	
Teen Choice Awards	August 7, 2011	Choice Summer Movie Actor	Shia LaBeouf	Nominated	
Teen Choice Awards	August 7, 2011	Choice Summer Movie Actress	Rosie Huntington-Whiteley	Nominated	
Visual Effects Society Awards	February 7, 2012	Outstanding Visual Effects in a Visual Effects Driven Feature Motion Picture	Scott Benza, Wayne Billheimer, Matthew E. Butler, and Scott Farrar	Nominated	
Visual Effects Society Awards	February 7, 2012	Outstanding Compositing in a Feature Motion Picture	Chris Balog, Ben O'Brien, Amy Shepard, and Jeff Sutherland	Nominated	
Visual Effects Society Awards	February 7, 2012	Outstanding Created Environment in a Live Action Feature Motion Picture	Giles Hancock, John Hansen, Tom Martinek, and Scott Younkin for "155 Wacker Drive"	Won	
Visual Effects Society Awards	February 7, 2012	Outstanding Models in a Feature Motion Picture	Tim Brakensiek, Kelvin Chu, David Fogler, and Rene Garcia for "Driller"	Won	
Visual Effects Society Awards	February 7, 2012	Outstanding Virtual Cinematography in a Live Action Feature Motion Picture	Michael Balog, Richard Bluff, Shawn Kelly, and Jeff White	Nominated	

== Sequels ==
Despite previous discussions regarding Bay's departure from the Transformers film series, he returned to direct a sequel, and development of the follow-up began afterward. Di Bonaventura described the project as an "evolution", with another set of cast members and a different story. Transformers: Age of Extinction (2014) received a less enthusiastic response and achieved similar financial success as Dark of the Moon, becoming the highest-grossing film of 2014. It was followed by Transformers: The Last Knight (2017), which became a box-office bomb and lost the studio an estimated $100 million. The series narrative was expanded in two films that preceded the first five: Bumblebee (2018) shows the title character arriving on Earth; and Transformers: Rise of the Beasts (2023) focuses on the conflict between the Autobots and the Maximals, and the Terrorcons.

== See also ==
- Apollo 11 in popular culture
