= Scott Benza =

American visual effects artist

- Born: April 10, 1974 (age 52)
- Occupation: Visual effects artist
- Years active: 1998–present

Scott Benza is a visual effects supervisor. His first Oscar nomination, at the 80th Academy Awards, was for the 2007 film Transformers. His second was at the 84th Academy Awards for the 2011 film Transformers: Dark of the Moon, and his third was at the 90th Academy Awards for the 2017 film Kong: Skull Island.
