= Tú Làn Caves System =

Cave system in Vietnam

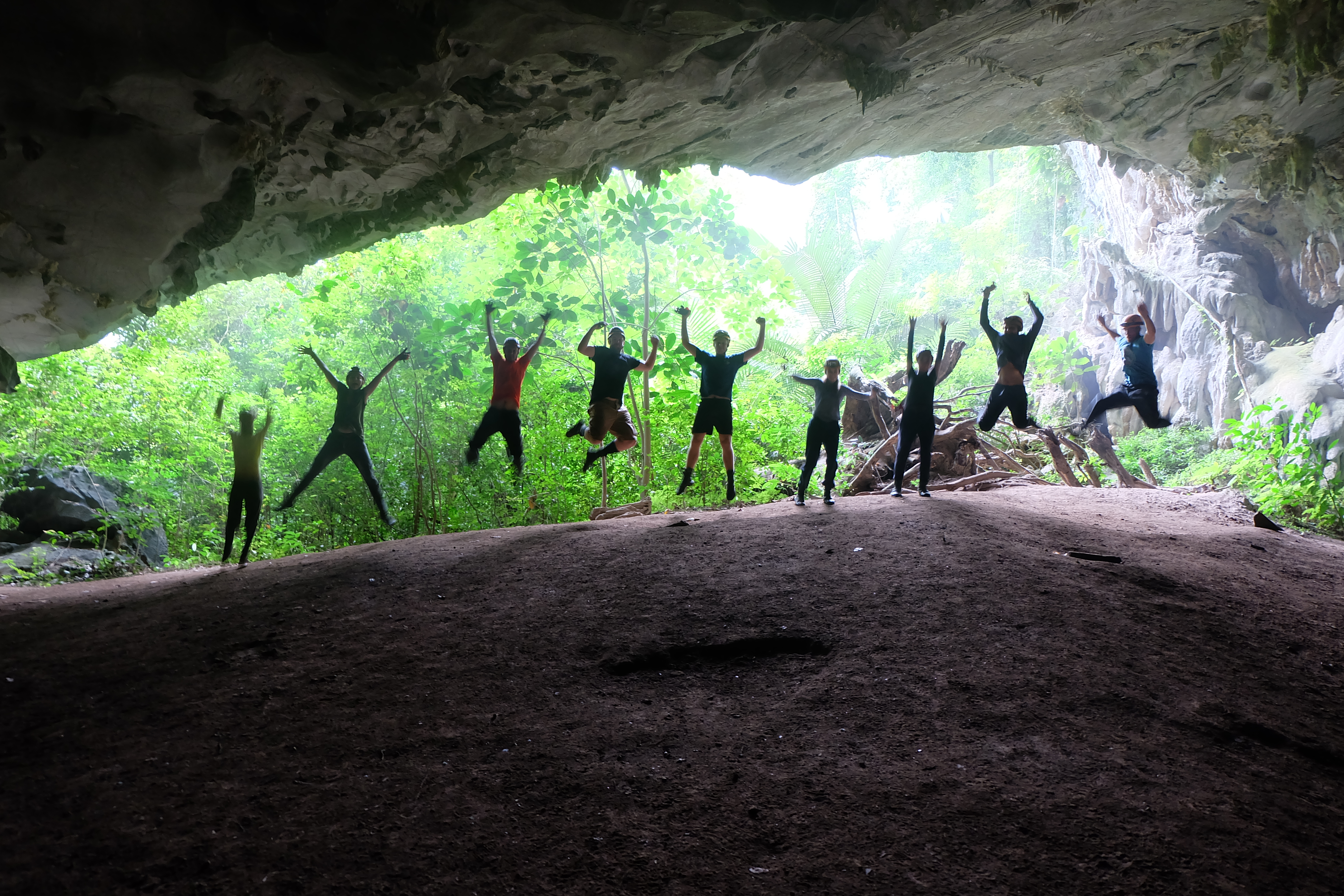
The entrance of Tu Lan Cave

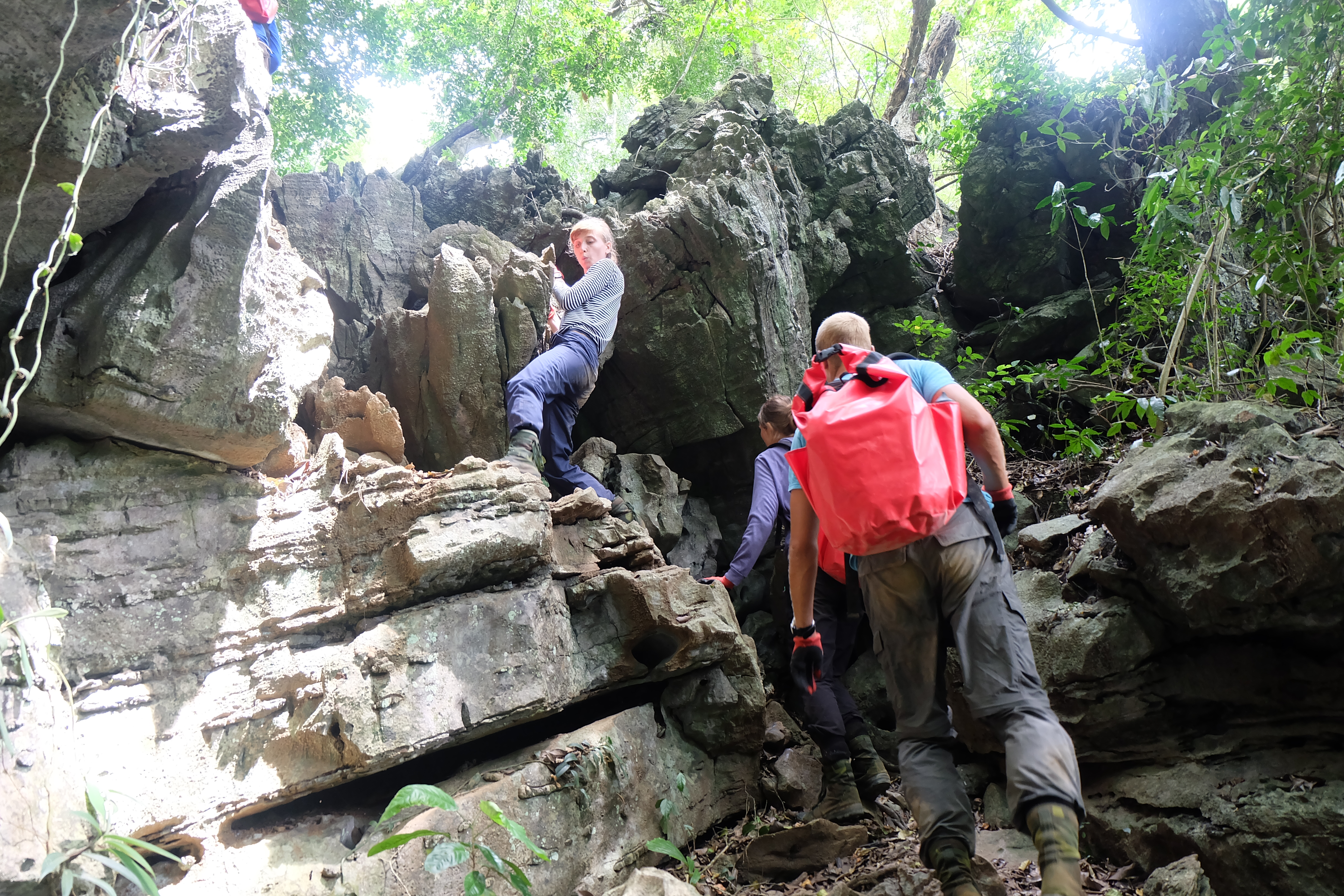
Climb up rocky hill to a small jungle opening

Tu Lan Cave System is located on Rao Nan (Nan river) in Tân Hóa Village, Minh Hoa District, Quang Binh, Vietnam. It is about 70 km North-West of Phong Nha - Ke Bang National Park.

== Tú Làn discovery ==
There are many caves in this limestone mountain area with stalagmites and stalactites, as well as underground rivers and waterfalls. Tu Lan Cave System comprises over 10 caves, some of which were originally discovered and explored in 1992, and some of which were just found in the past couple years.

Hang Ton (Ton cave), was first found in 1992 and explored more in depth in 2012, appears first on the horizon on a trek to this intricate cave system.

== Caves ==
There are more than 10 caves in Tu Lan Cave System: Ton Cave, Ken Cave, Kim Cave, Tu Lan Cave, Chuot Cave, Tien Cave, Uoi Cave, Ruc Cave, Secret Cave, Doi Cave, To Mo Cave.

== Geology ==
As the tectonic plates in this region are always moving and bumping into each other, the mountains are still rising and moving up. The rivers continue to cut into the bottom of the mountain, carving new caves over time. Hence, the river caves that are at a lower elevation are much younger than the higher, dry caves as they were more recently created. The river caves in this system such as Ken Cave and Tu Lan Cave are very young, only about 3 million years old. The higher, dry caves (dry Tu Lan and Ton Cave) are much older, and date around 5 million years old. The French scientist Pierre G commented: "Tu Lan Cave System have the largest, deepest, longest, highest with many of connecting caves including inactive dry caves & active wet caves; including a number of natural phenomena such as the deepest Karst Doline of Southeast Asia (with a depth of more than 255m) and the habitat, stunning natural wonders, the majestic, unique of tropical jungle on the 400 million years of limestone."

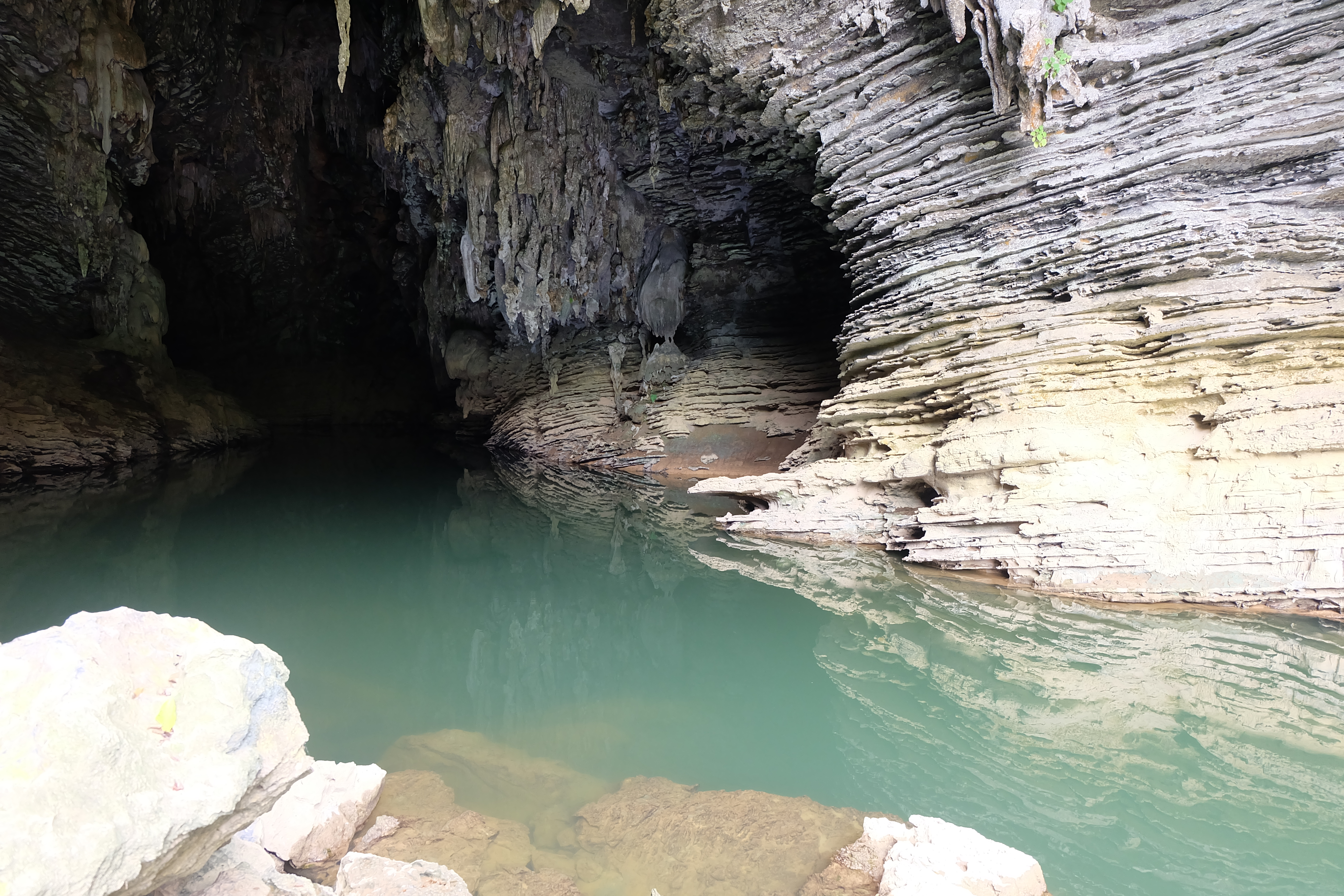
Ken Cave's entrance

The stalactites and stalagmites are enormous. One of the caves in the Tu Lan cave system, Ken Cave, even had its formations featured recently in National Geographic (The Top 10 Photographs of 2011) by world renowned photographer Carsten Peter.

== Tourist activities ==
Oxalis Adventure Tours is the solely operator of Tu Lan Caves System. Explorers will have to trek through remote jungle; cross through buffalo fields; be surrounded by limestone mountains on all sides; and plunge into underground rivers that wind through mountains and river valleys alike.
