= List of accolades received by The Matrix film series =

This is a list of awards and nominations received by The Matrix franchise. The Matrix is a 1999 science fiction action film. It spawned three sequels, two of them filmed and released in the same year, The Matrix Reloaded and The Matrix Revolutions. A third sequel, The Matrix Resurrections, was released on December 22, 2021. The first three films were written and directed by The Wachowskis and starred Keanu Reeves, Laurence Fishburne, Carrie-Anne Moss and Hugo Weaving. The fourth film was written by Lana Wachowski, David Mitchell and Aleksandar Hemon, was directed by Lana Wachowski and starred Reeves and Moss.

== The Matrix (1999) ==
| Award | Category | Recipient(s) | Result |
|---|---|---|---|
| Academy Awards | Best Film Editing | Zach Staenberg | Won |
| Academy Awards | Best Sound | Nominees: John T. Reitz; Gregg Rudloff; David E. Campbell; David Lee | Won |
| Academy Awards | Best Sound Editing | Dane A. Davis | Won |
| Academy Awards | Best Visual Effects | Nominees: John Gaeta; Janek Sirrs; Steve Courtley; Jon Thum | Won |
| Amanda | Best Foreign Feature Film | The Wachowskis | Nominated |
| American Cinema Editors | Best Edited Feature Film - Dramatic | Zach Staenberg | Won |
| Art Directors Guild | Excellence in Production Design Award for a Feature Film | Nominees: Owen Paterson; Michelle McGahey; Hugh Bateup | Nominated |
| BAFTA Awards | Best Achievement in Special Visual Effects | Nominees: John Gaeta; Steve Courtley; Janek Sirrs; Jon Thum | Won |
| BAFTA Awards | Best Sound | Nominees: David Lee; John T. Reitz; Gregg Rudloff; David E. Campbell; Dane A. Davis | Won |
| BAFTA Awards | Best Cinematography | Bill Pope | Nominated |
| BAFTA Awards | Best Editing | Zach Staenberg | Nominated |
| BAFTA Awards | Best Production Design | Owen Paterson | Nominated |
| BMI Film & TV Awards | BMI Film Music Award | Don Davis | Won |
| Black Reel Awards | Theatrical: Best Actor | Laurence Fishburne | Nominated |
| Blockbuster Entertainment Awards | Favorite Actor: Action/Science Fiction | Keanu Reeves | Won |
| Blockbuster Entertainment Awards | Favorite Supporting Actor: Action/Science-Fiction | Laurence Fishburne | Won |
| Blockbuster Entertainment Awards | Favorite Actress: Newcomer (Internet Only) | Carrie-Anne Moss | Nominated |
| Blockbuster Entertainment Awards | Favorite Villain | Hugo Weaving | Nominated |
| Bogey Awards | In Gold | — | Won |
| Brit Awards | Best Soundtrack | Don Davis | Nominated |
| Cinema Audio Society awards | Outstanding Achievement in Sound Mixing for a Feature Film | Nominees: John T. Reitz; Gregg Rudloff; David E. Campbell; David Lee | Won |
| Costume Designers Guild Awards | Excellence in Period/Fantasy Film | Kym Barrett | Nominated |
| Csapnivalo Awards | Best Actor in a Leading Role | Keanu Reeves | Won |
| Csapnivalo Awards | Best Actress in a Leading Role | Carrie-Anne Moss | Won |
| Csapnivalo Awards | Best Visual Effects | — | Won |
| DVD Exclusive Awards | 2003 Artistic Achievement Award | — | Won |
| DVD Exclusive Awards | 2001 Video Premiere Award- Best Original Retrospective Documentary | Josh Oreck | Nominated |
| Empire Awards | Best Debut | Carrie-Anne Moss | Won |
| Empire Awards | Best Film | — | Won |
| Golden Screen | Golden Screen Award | — | Won |
| Golden Trailer Awards | Best Action | Philip R. Daccord | Won |
| Golden Trailer Awards | Best Art and Commerce | Philip R. Daccord | Won |
| Golden Trailer Awards | Best Edit | Philip R. Daccord | Won |
| Golden Trailer Awards | Best of Show | Philip R. Daccord | Won |
| Grammy Awards | Best Soundtrack Album | — | Nominated |
| Hugo Awards | Best Dramatic Presentation | The Wachowskis | Nominated |
| Image Awards | Outstanding Actor in a Motion Picture | Laurence Fishburne | Nominated |
| Image Awards | Outstanding Motion Picture | — | Nominated |
| Japan Academy Prize | Best Foreign Film | — | Nominated |
| Key Art Awards | Best of Show - Audiovisual | — | Won |
| Las Vegas Film Critics Society | Best Visual Effects | John Gaeta | Won |
| Las Vegas Film Critics Society | Best Editing | Zach Staenberg | Nominated |
| Las Vegas Film Critics Society | Best Production Design | Owen Paterson | Nominated |
| Las Vegas Film Critics Society | Best Original Screenplay | The Wachowskis | Nominated |
| MTV Movie Awards | Best Fight | Keanu Reeves; Laurence Fishburne | Won |
| MTV Movie Awards | Best Male Performance | Keanu Reeves | Won |
| MTV Movie Awards | Best Movie | — | Won |
| MTV Movie Awards | Best Action Sequence- For the rooftop/helicopter sequence | — | Nominated |
| MTV Movie Awards | Best On-Screen Duo | Keanu Reeves; Laurence Fishburne | Nominated |
| MTV Movie Awards | Breakthrough Female Performance | Carrie-Anne Moss | Nominated |
| Mainichi Film Concours | Best Foreign Language Film | The Wachowskis | Won |
| Motion Picture Sound Editors | Best Sound Editing - Effects & Foley | Nominees: Dane A. Davis; Thom Brennan; Julia Evershade; Eric Lindemann; David Grimaldi; Susan Dudeck; Valerie Davidson; Nancy Barker; David McRell; Barbara Delpuech; Frank Long; Noel McIntosh; John Roesch; Hilda Hodges; Eric Lindemann; John T. Reitz; Gregg Rudloff; David E. Campbell; Kevin E. Carpenter; Mary Jo Lang; Carolyn Tapp | Won |
| Motion Picture Sound Editors | Best Sound Editing - Dialogue & ADR | Nominees: Dane A. Davis; Charles W. Ritter; Julia Evershade; Susan Dudeck | Nominated |
| Motion Picture Sound Editors | Best Sound Editing - Music (Foreign & Domestic) | Nominees: Lori L. Eschler; Zigmund Gron; Jordan Corngold | Nominated |
| Satellite Awards | Best Overall DVD (for Trilogy boxset) | — | Nominated |
| Satellite Awards | Best Visual Effects | Nominees: Steve Courtley; Brian Cox; John Gaeta | Nominated |
| Saturn Award | Best Director | The Wachowskis | Won |
| Saturn Award | Best Science Fiction Film | — | Won |
| Saturn Award | Best Actor | Keanu Reeves | Nominated |
| Saturn Award | Best Actress | Carrie-Anne Moss | Nominated |
| Saturn Award | Best Costumes | Kym Barrett | Nominated |
| Saturn Award | Best Make-Up | Nominees: Nikki Gooley; Bob McCarron; Wendy Sainsbury | Nominated |
| Saturn Award | Best Special Effects | Nominees: John Gaeta; Janek Sirrs; Steve Courtley; Jon Thum | Nominated |
| Saturn Award | Best Supporting Actor | Laurence Fishburne | Nominated |
| Saturn Award | Best Writer | The Wachowskis | Nominated |
| Science Fiction and Fantasy Writers of America | Nebula Best Script | The Wachowskis | Nominated |

== The Matrix Reloaded (2003) ==
| Award | Category | Recipient(s) | Result |
|---|---|---|---|
| Academy of Science Fiction, Fantasy & Horror Films | 2004 Cinescape Genre Face of the Future Award- Male | Clayton Watson | Nominated |
| Academy of Science Fiction, Fantasy & Horror Films | 2003 Cinescape Genre Face of the Future Award- Female | Monica Bellucci | Nominated |
| BMI Film & TV Awards | BMI Film Music Award | Don Davis | Won |
| Black Reel Awards | Film- Best Supporting Actress | Gloria Foster | Nominated |
| Golden Trailer Awards | Best Action | — | Nominated |
| Golden Trailer Awards | Best Voice-over | — | Nominated |
| MTV Movie Awards | Best Fight | Keanu Reeves; Hugo Weaving | Nominated |
| MTV Movie Awards | Best Kiss | Keanu Reeves; Monica Bellucci | Nominated |
| MTV Movie Awards, Mexico | Sexiest Hero | Keanu Reeves | Nominated |
| Motion Picture Sound Editors | Best Sound Editing in Domestic Features - Sound Effects & Foley | Nominees: Dane A. Davis; Julia Evershade; Thom Brennan; Eric Lindemann; Michael Edward Johnson; Andrew Lackey; Mark Larry; Richard Adrian; Michael W. Mitchell | Nominated |
| Razzie Awards | Worst Director | The Wachowskis | Nominated |
| Satellite Awards | Best Overall DVD | — | Nominated |
| Teen Choice Awards | Choice Action Movie | — | Won |
| Teen Choice Awards | Choice Action Movie Actor | Keanu Reeves | Nominated |
| Teen Choice Awards | Choice Action Movie Actress | Jada Pinkett-Smith | Nominated |
| Teen Choice Awards | Choice Breakout Movie Actress | Monica Bellucci | Nominated |
| Teen Choice Awards | Choice Movie Fight | Keanu Reeves; Hugo Weaving | Nominated |
| Visual Effects Society Awards | Best Single Visual Effect of the Year in Any Medium | Nominees: John Gaeta; Dan Glass; Adrian De Wet; Greg Juby | Won |
| Visual Effects Society Awards | Outstanding Visual Effects Photography in a Motion Picture | Nominees: Kim Libreri; George Borshukov; Paul Ryan; John Gaeta | Nominated |
| World Stunt Awards | Best Overall Stunt by a Stunt Woman | Debbie Evans | Won |
| World Stunt Awards | Best Fight | Nominees: Ousaun Ela; Tiger Hu Chen; David Leitch; Brad Martin; David No; Chad Stahelski; Marcus Young | Nominated |
| World Stunt Awards | Best Overall Stunt by a Stunt Woman | Debby Lynn Ross | Nominated |
| World Stunt Awards | Best Stunt Coordination Feature Film | Nominees: Glenn Boswell; David R. Ellis; R.A. Rondell | Nominated |

== The Matrix Revolutions (2003) ==
| Award | Category | Recipient(s) | Result |
|---|---|---|---|
| Saturn Awards | Best Costumes | Kym Barrett | Nominated |
| Saturn Awards | Best Science Fiction Film | — | Nominated |
| Saturn Awards | Best Special Effects | Nominees: John Gaeta; Kim Libreri; George Murphy; Craig Hayes | Nominated |
| BMI Film & TV Awards | BMI Film Music Award | Don Davis | Won |
| Black Reel Awards | Film: Best Supporting Actress | Mary Alice | Nominated |
| Image Awards | Outstanding Actor in a Motion Picture | Laurence Fishburne | Nominated |
| Image Awards | Outstanding Supporting Actress in a Motion Picture | Nona Gaye | Nominated |
| Image Awards | Outstanding Supporting Actress in a Motion Picture | Jada Pinkett-Smith | Nominated |
| Phoenix Film Critics Society Awards | Best Visual Effects | Nominees: John Gaeta; Kim Libreri; George Murphy; Craig Hayes | Nominated |
| Razzie Awards | Worst Director | The Wachowskis | Nominated |
| Satellite Awards | Best Overall DVD | — | Nominated |
| Teen Choice Awards | Choice Action Movie | — | Nominated |
| Teen Choice Awards | Choice Action Movie Actor | Keanu Reeves | Nominated |
| Teen Choice Awards | Choice Action Movie Actress | Carrie-Anne Moss | Nominated |
| Teen Choice Awards | Choice Movie Fight | Keanu Reeves; Hugo Weaving | Nominated |
| Visual Effects Society Awards | Outstanding Visual Effects in a Visual Effects Driven Motion Picture | Nominees: John Gaeta; Kim Libreri; George Murphy; Craig Hayes | Nominated |

== The Matrix Resurrections (2021) ==
| Award | Date of the ceremony | Category | Recipient(s) | Result | Ref(s) |
|---|---|---|---|---|---|
| Critics' Choice Movie Awards | March 13, 2022 | Best Visual Effects | The Matrix Resurrections | Nominated | |
| Houston Film Critics Society | February 19, 2022 | Best Stunt Coordination | The Matrix Resurrections | Nominated | |
| Houston Film Critics Society | February 19, 2022 | Best Visual Effects | The Matrix Resurrections | Nominated | |
| Screen Actors Guild Awards | February 27, 2022 | Outstanding Performance by a Stunt Ensemble in a Motion Picture | The Matrix Resurrections | Nominated | |
| Seattle Film Critics Society | January 17, 2022 | Best Visual Effects | Dan Glass, Huw J. Evans, Tom Debenham, and J. D. Schwalm | Nominated | |
| Visual Effects Society | March 8, 2022 | Outstanding Visual Effects in a Photoreal Feature | Dan Glass, Nina Fallon, Tom Debenham, Huw J Evans, James Schwalm | Nominated | |
| Visual Effects Society | March 8, 2022 | Outstanding Special (Practical) Effects in a Photoreal or Animated Project | JD Schwalm, Brendon O'Dell, Michael Kay, Pau Costa Moeller | Nominated | |
