= 53rd British Academy Film Awards =

2000 film awards ceremony

- Date: 9 April 2000
- Site: Odeon Leicester Square
- Hosted by: Jack Docherty

Highlights
- Best Film: American Beauty
- Best British Film: East Is East
- Best Actor: Kevin Spacey; American Beauty
- Best Actress: Annette Bening; American Beauty
- Most awards: American Beauty (6)
- Most nominations: American Beauty (14)

The 53rd British Academy Film Awards, more commonly known as the BAFTAs, took place on 9 April 2000 at the Odeon Leicester Square in London, honouring the best national and foreign films of 1999. Presented by the British Academy of Film and Television Arts, accolades were handed out for the best feature-length film and documentaries of any nationality that were screened at British cinemas in 1999.

Sam Mendes's American Beauty won the award for Best Film (and previously won the Academy Award for Best Picture), Actor (Kevin Spacey), Actress (Annette Bening), Cinematography, Editing, and Original Music; Spacey previously won the Academy Award for Best Actor. Jude Law (The Talented Mr. Ripley) and Maggie Smith (Tea with Mussolini) won the awards for Best Supporting Actor and Actress, respectively. Pedro Almodóvar, director of All About My Mother, won for his direction. East Is East was voted Outstanding British Film.

The nominations were announced on 1 March 2000 and the ceremony took place at the Odeon Leicester Square in London, hosted by Jack Docherty.

== Winners and nominees ==
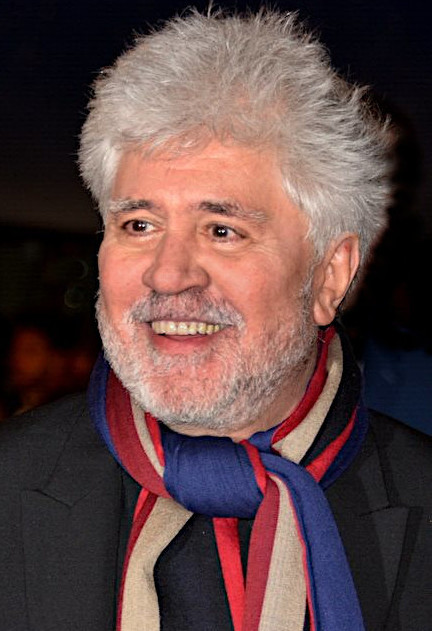
Pedro Almodóvar, Best Director winner

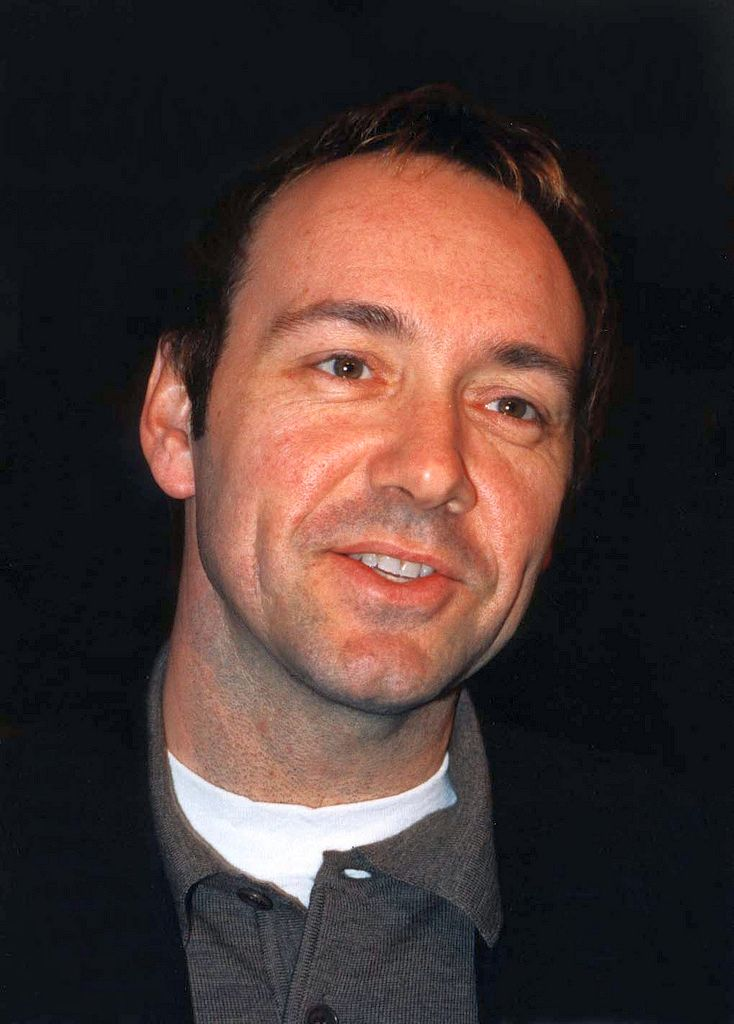
Kevin Spacey, Best Actor winner

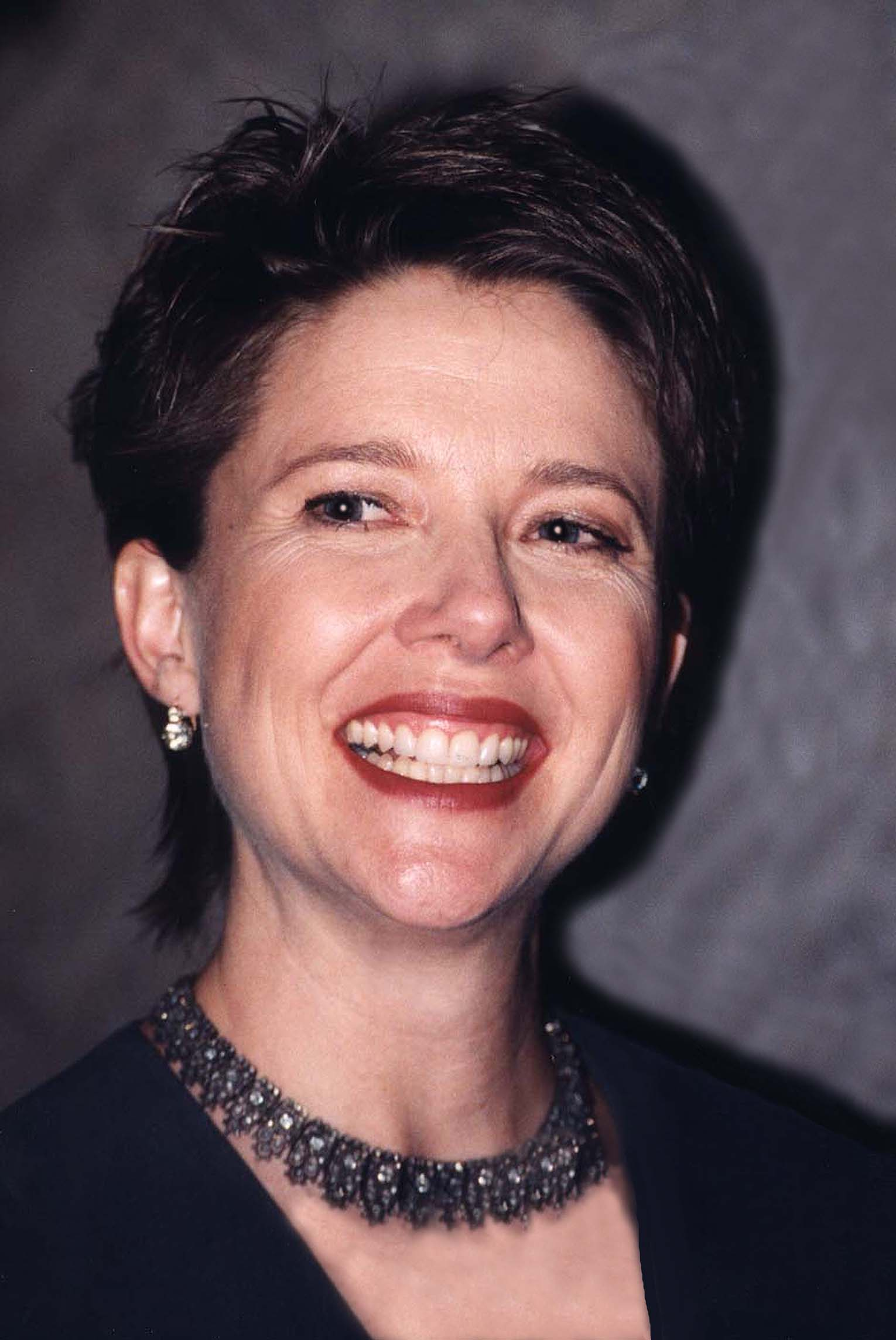
Annette Bening, Best Actress winner

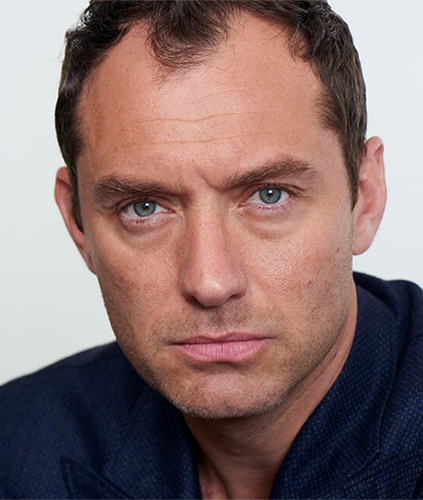
Jude Law, Best Supporting Actor winner

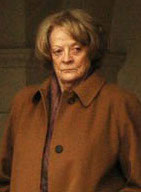
Maggie Smith, Best Supporting Actress winner

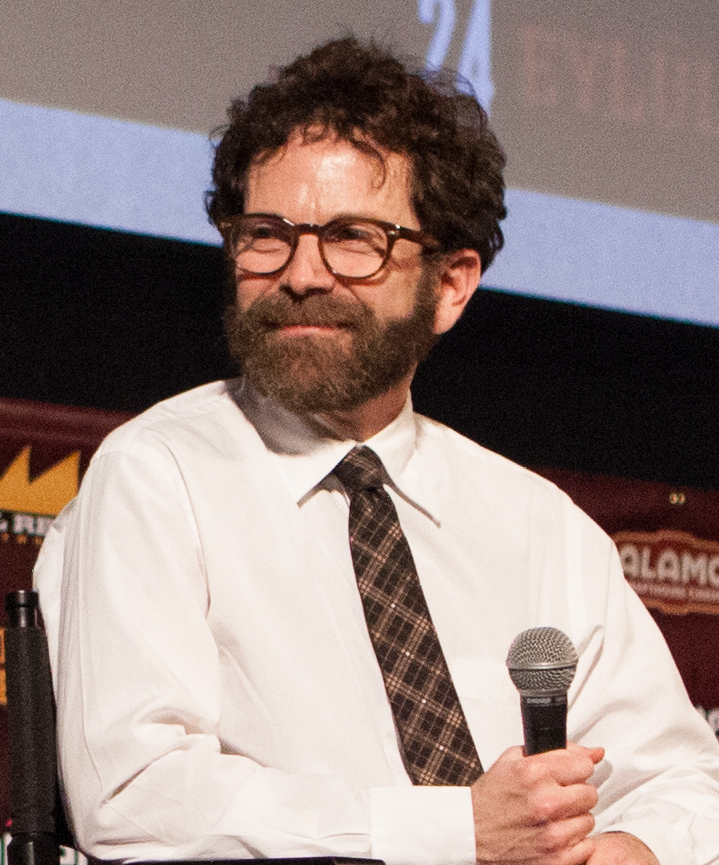
Charlie Kaufman, Best Original Screenplay winner

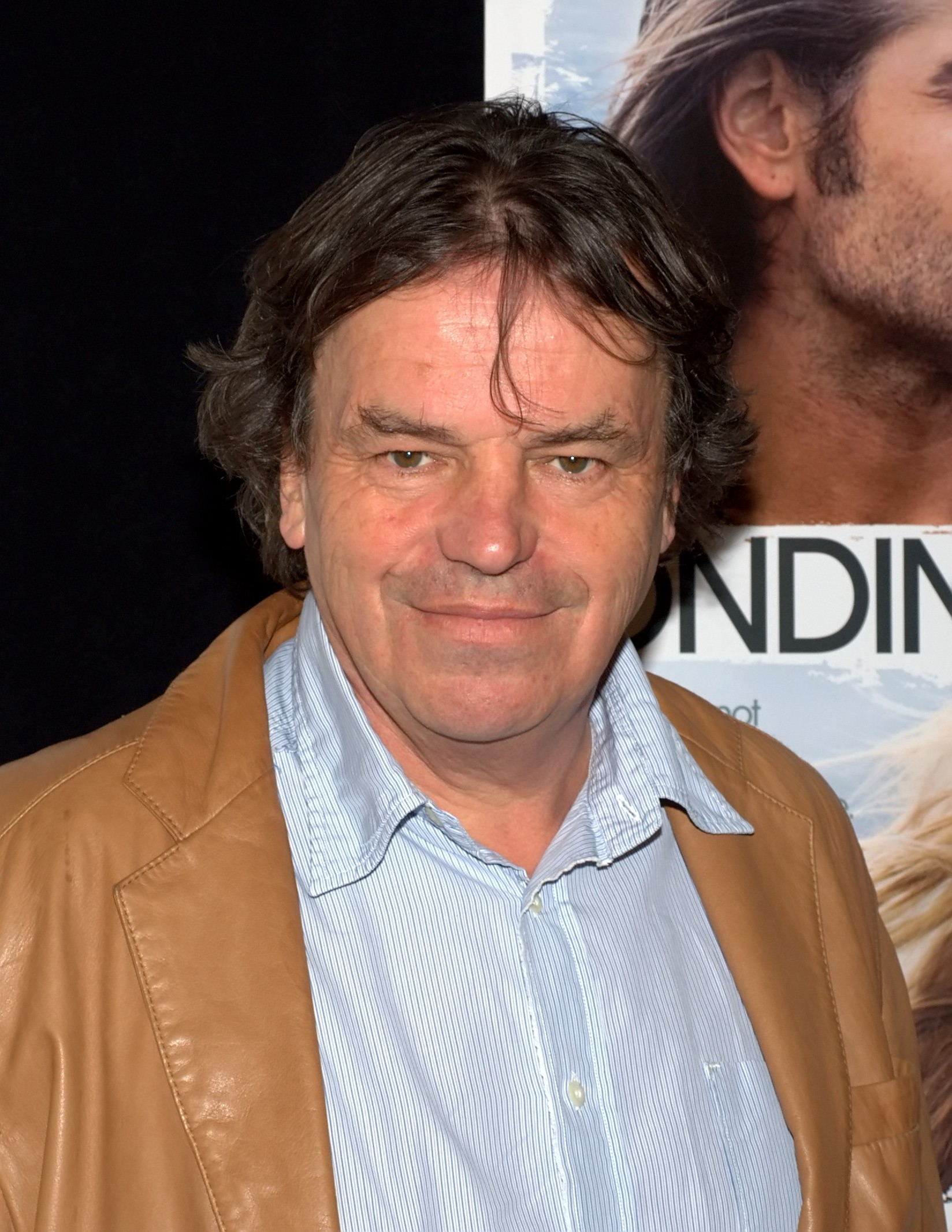
Neil Jordan, Best Adapted Screenplay winner

=== BAFTA Fellowship ===
- **Michael Caine** and **Stanley Kubrick** (posthumous)

=== Outstanding British Contribution to Cinema ===
- **Joyce Herlihy**

=== Awards ===
Winners are listed first and highlighted in boldface.

**Best Film**: **American Beauty – Bruce Cohen and Dan Jinks**; East Is East – Leslee Udwin; The End of the Affair – Stephen Woolley and Neil Jordan; The Sixth Sense – Frank Marshall, Kathleen Kennedy and Barry Mendel; The Talented Mr. Ripley – William Horberg and Tom Sternberg	**Best Direction**: **Pedro Almodóvar – All About My Mother**; Neil Jordan – The End of the Affair; Anthony Minghella – The Talented Mr. Ripley; Sam Mendes – American Beauty; M. Night Shyamalan – The Sixth Sense
**Best Actor in a Leading Role**: **Kevin Spacey – American Beauty as Lester Burnham**; Jim Broadbent – Topsy-Turvy as W. S. Gilbert; Russell Crowe – The Insider as Jeffrey Wigand; Ralph Fiennes – The End of the Affair as Maurice Bendrix; Om Puri – East Is East as George Khan	**Best Actress in a Leading Role**: **Annette Bening – American Beauty as Carolyn Burnham**; Linda Bassett – East Is East as Ella Khan; Julianne Moore – The End of the Affair as Sarah Miles; Emily Watson – Angela's Ashes as Angela McCourt
**Best Actor in a Supporting Role**: **Jude Law – The Talented Mr. Ripley as Dickie Greenleaf**; Wes Bentley – American Beauty as Ricky Fitts; Michael Caine – The Cider House Rules as Dr. Wilbur Larch; Rhys Ifans – Notting Hill as Spike; Timothy Spall – Topsy-Turvy as Richard Temple	**Best Actress in a Supporting Role**: **Maggie Smith – Tea with Mussolini as Lady Hester Random**; Thora Birch – American Beauty as Jane Burnham; Cate Blanchett – The Talented Mr. Ripley as Meredith Logue; Cameron Diaz – Being John Malkovich as Lotte Schwartz; Mena Suvari – American Beauty as Angela Hayes
**Best Original Screenplay**: **Being John Malkovich – Charlie Kaufman**; All About My Mother – Pedro Almodóvar; American Beauty – Alan Ball; The Sixth Sense – M. Night Shyamalan; Topsy-Turvy – Mike Leigh	**Best Adapted Screenplay**: **The End of the Affair – Neil Jordan**; East Is East – Ayub Khan Din; An Ideal Husband – Oliver Parker; The Talented Mr. Ripley – Anthony Minghella
**Best Cinematography**: **American Beauty – Conrad Hall**; Angela's Ashes – Michael Seresin; The End of the Affair – Roger Pratt; The Matrix – Bill Pope; The Talented Mr. Ripley – John Seale	**Best Costume Design**: **Sleepy Hollow – Colleen Atwood**; The End of the Affair – Sandy Powell; An Ideal Husband – Caroline Harris; Tea with Mussolini – Jenny Beavan, Anna Anni and Alberto Spiazzi
**Best Editing**: **American Beauty – Tariq Anwar and Christopher Greenbury**; Being John Malkovich – Eric Zumbrunnen; The Matrix – Zach Staenberg; The Sixth Sense – Andrew Mondshein	**Best Makeup and Hair**: **Topsy-Turvy – Christine Blundell**; American Beauty – Tania McComas and Carol O'Connell; The End of the Affair – Christine Beveridge; An Ideal Husband – Peter King
**Best Original Music**: **American Beauty – Thomas Newman**; Buena Vista Social Club – Ry Cooder and Nick Gold; The End of the Affair – Michael Nyman; The Talented Mr. Ripley – Gabriel Yared	**Best Production Design**: **Sleepy Hollow – Rick Heinrichs**; American Beauty – Naomi Shohan; Angela's Ashes – Geoffrey Kirkland; The End of the Affair – Anthony D. G. Pratt; The Matrix – Owen Paterson
**Best Sound**: **The Matrix – David Lee, John T. Reitz, Gregg Rudloff, David E. Campbell and Dane Davis**; American Beauty – Scott Martin Gershin, Scott Millan, Bob Beemer and Richard Van Dyke; Buena Vista Social Club – Martin Müller and Jerry Boys; Star Wars: Episode I – The Phantom Menace – Ben Burtt, Tom Bellfort, John Midgley, Gary Rydstrom, Tom Johnson and Shawn Murphy	**Best Special Visual Effects**: **The Matrix – John Gaeta, Steve Courtley, Janek Sirrs and Jon Thum**; A Bug's Life – William Reeves, Eben Fiske Ostby, Rick Sayre and Sharon Calahan; The Mummy – John Berton, Daniel Jeannette, Ben Snow and Chris Corbould; Sleepy Hollow – Jimmy Mitchell, Kevin Yagher, Joss Williams and Paddy Eason; Star Wars: Episode I – The Phantom Menace – John Knoll, Dennis Muren, Scott Squires and Rob Coleman
**Outstanding British Film**: **East Is East – Leslee Udwin and Damien O'Donnell**; Notting Hill – Duncan Kenworthy and Roger Michell; Onegin – Ileen Maisel, Simon Bosanquet and Martha Fiennes; Ratcatcher – Gavin Emerson and Lynne Ramsay; Topsy-Turvy – Simon Channing Williams and Mike Leigh; Wonderland – Michele Camarda, Andrew Eaton and Michael Winterbottom	**Outstanding Debut by a British Writer, Director or Producer**: **Ratcatcher – Lynne Ramsay (Writer/Director)**; East Is East – Ayub Khan Din (Writer); Human Traffic – Justin Kerrigan (Writer/Director); Waking Ned – Kirk Jones (Writer/Director)
**Best Short Animation**: **The Man with the Beautiful Eyes – Jonathan Bairstow and Jonathan Hodgson**; Jolly Roger – Claire Jennings, Mark Baker and Neville Astley; The Old Man and the Sea – Bernard Lajoie, Tatsuo Shimamura and Aleksandr Petrov; Periwig Maker – Annette Schäffler and Steffen Schäffler	**Best Short Film**: **Who's My Favourite Girl? – Joern Utkilen, Kara Johnston and Adrian J. McDowall**; Bait – Soledad Gatti-Pascual, Tom Shankland and Jane Harris; Perdie – Rachel Shadick and Faye Gilbert; The Tale of the Rat That Wrote – Ruth Kenley-Letts, Lisa-Marie Russo, Billy O'Brien and Murilo Pasta
**Best Film Not in the English Language**: **All About My Mother – Agustín Almodóvar and Pedro Almodóvar**; Buena Vista Social Club – Ulrich Felsberg, Deepak Nayar and Wim Wenders; Festen – Birgitte Hald and Thomas Vinterberg; Run Lola Run – Stefan Arndt and Tom Tykwer

== Statistics ==
Films that received multiple nominations
Nominations	Film
14	American Beauty
10	The End of the Affair
7	The Talented Mr. Ripley
6	East Is East
5	The Matrix
5	Topsy-Turvy
4	The Sixth Sense
3	All About My Mother
3	Angela's Ashes
3	Being John Malkovich
3	Buena Vista Social Club
3	An Ideal Husband
3	Sleepy Hollow
2	Notting Hill
2	Ratcatcher
2	Star Wars: Episode I – The Phantom Menace
2	Tea with Mussolini

Films that received multiple awards
Awards	Film
6	American Beauty
2	All About My Mother
2	The Matrix
2	Sleepy Hollow

== See also ==
- 72nd Academy Awards
- 25th César Awards
- 5th Critics' Choice Awards
- 52nd Directors Guild of America Awards
- 13th European Film Awards
- 57th Golden Globe Awards
- 11th Golden Laurel Awards
- 20th Golden Raspberry Awards
- 4th Golden Satellite Awards
- 14th Goya Awards
- 15th Independent Spirit Awards
- 5th Lumière Awards
- 26th Saturn Awards
- 6th Screen Actors Guild Awards
- 52nd Writers Guild of America Awards
