= List of accolades received by American Beauty =

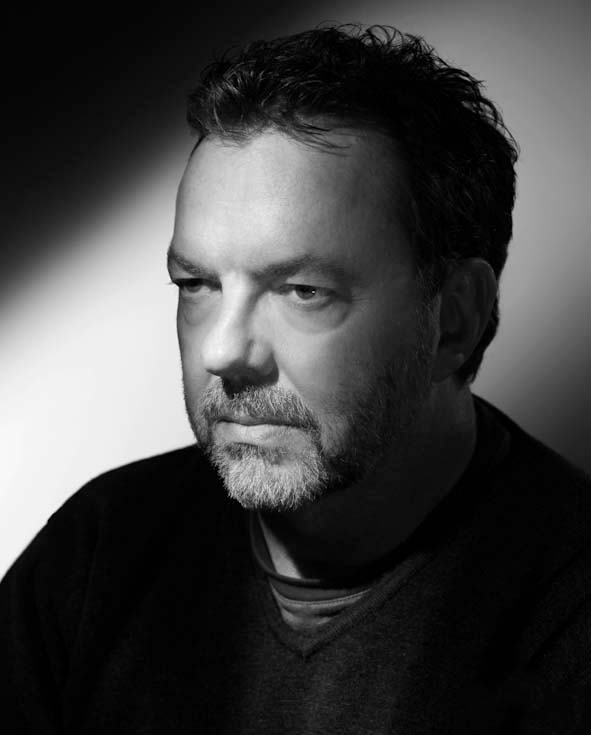
- Alan Ball, whose screenplay was the focus of many of the awards wins and nominations
Award wins & nominations
Award	Won	Nominated
Academy Awards	5	8
Amanda Awards	1	1
American Cinema Editors	0	1
American Comedy Awards	1	3
ASC Awards	1	1
Art Directors Guild Awards	0	1
Australian Film Institute Awards	1	1
Awards of the Japanese Academy	0	1
Belgian Syndicate of Cinema Critics	0	1
British Academy of Film and Television Arts	6	14
BMI Film & Television Awards	1	1
Blockbuster Entertainment Awards	0	5
Bodil Awards	1	1
Bogey Awards	1	1
Brit Awards	0	1
British Society of Cinematographers Awards	1	1
Broadcast Film Critics	3	3
Casting Society of America Award	1	1
César Award	0	1
Chicago Film Critics Association	4	7
Cinema Audio Society Awards	0	1
Costume Designers Guild Awards	1	1
Czech Lion Award	1	1
Dallas-Fort Worth Film Critics Association Award	3	3
David di Donatello Awards	0	1
Directors Guild of America Awards	1	1
Empire Awards	0	4
European Film Awards	0	1
Film Critics Circle of Australia Awards	1	1
Florida Film Critics Circle Award	2	2
Golden Globe Awards	3	6
Golden Screen Award	1	1
Grammy Awards	1	2
Guldbagge Awards	0	1
Hollywood Makeup Artist and Hair Stylist Guild Awards	0	1
International Monitor Awards	1	1
Italian National Syndicate of Film Journalists Awards	1	1
Kansas City Film Critics Circle	3	3
Kinema Junpo Awards	1	1
Las Vegas Film Critics Society	2	8
London Film Critics' Circle Awards	5	5
Los Angeles Film Critics	1	1
Lumière Awards	1	1
Motion Picture Sound Editors	2	2
MTV Movie Awards	0	1
National Board of Review	2	2
National Society of Film Critics Awards	1	1
Online Film Critics Society	4	12
People's Choice Awards	1	1
PGA Awards	1	1
Publicists Guild of America Awards	1	1
Robert Award	1	1
Russian Guild of Film Critics Awards	1	1
San Diego Film Critics Society	4	4
Satellite Awards	0	7
Screen Actors Guild Awards	3	4
Southeastern Film Critics Association	4	4
Teen Choice Awards	0	3
Toronto Film Critics Association Awards	1	1
Writers Guild of America Awards	1	1
Young Artist Award	1	1
Young Hollywood Artist Awards	2	2
YoungStar Awards	1	1
- Total number of wins and nominations
Totals	89	160
- Footnotes

American Beauty is a 1999 American drama film directed by Sam Mendes and written by Alan Ball. The film stars Kevin Spacey as Lester Burnham, a middle-aged office worker who has a midlife crisis when he becomes infatuated with his teenage daughter's best friend. Released in North America on September 15, 1999, American Beauty was positively received by critics and audiences alike; it was the best-reviewed American film of the year and grossed over $350 million worldwide. Reviewers praised all aspects of the production, with particular emphasis on Mendes, Spacey and Ball; criticism tended to focus on the familiarity of the characters and setting. At the 1999 Academy Awards, the film won Best Picture, Best Director, Best Actor (for Spacey), Best Original Screenplay and Best Cinematography (for Conrad Hall). The film was nominated for and won numerous other awards and honors, mainly for the direction, writing, and acting.

DreamWorks launched a major campaign to promote the film five weeks before the ballots for the Academy Awards were due. Its campaign combined traditional advertising and publicity with more focused strategies to reach 5,600 Academy voters. Although direct mail campaigning was prohibited, DreamWorks reached voters by promoting the film in "casual, comfortable settings" in voters' communities. The studio's candidate for the Academy Award for Best Picture the previous year, Saving Private Ryan, lost to Shakespeare in Love, so the studio took a new approach by hiring outsiders to provide input for the campaign. Nancy Willen encouraged DreamWorks to produce a special about the making of American Beauty, to set up displays of the film in the communities' bookstores, and to arrange a question-and-answer session with Mendes for the British Academy of Film and Television Arts. Dale Olson, who led the film's campaign, advised the studio to not limit its marketing to major newspapers, but to also advertise in free publications that circulated in Beverly Hills, home to many voters. Olson arranged to screen American Beauty to about 1,000 members of the Actors Fund of America, as many participating actors were also voters.

American Beauty's closest contender for Best Picture was seen as The Cider House Rules from Miramax. Both studios mounted aggressive campaigns; in the weeks leading up the ceremony, DreamWorks bought 38% more advertising space in Variety than Miramax. In 2000, the Publicists Guild of America recognized DreamWorks for the best film publicity campaign. In September 2008, Empire named American Beauty the 96th "Greatest Movie of All Time" after a poll of 10,000 readers, 150 filmmakers and 50 film critics. The film's award success was seen as vindication for DreamWorks, a studio which had only formed six years previously—to industry skepticism.

== Selected awards and nominations ==
Award	Category	Name	Outcome
72nd Academy Awards	Best Picture	Bruce Cohen and Dan Jinks	Won
72nd Academy Awards	Best Director	Sam Mendes	Won
72nd Academy Awards	Best Actor	Kevin Spacey	Won
72nd Academy Awards	Best Actress	Annette Bening	Nominated
72nd Academy Awards	Best Original Screenplay	Alan Ball	Won
72nd Academy Awards	Best Cinematography	Conrad Hall	Won
72nd Academy Awards	Best Film Editing	Tariq Anwar and Christopher Greenbury	Nominated
72nd Academy Awards	Best Original Score	Thomas Newman	Nominated
American Cinema Editors	Best Edited Feature Film – Dramatic	Tariq Anwar, Christopher Greenbury	Nominated
American Comedy Awards	Funniest Actress in a Motion Picture (Leading Role)	Annette Bening	Won
American Comedy Awards	Funniest Motion Picture		Nominated
American Comedy Awards	Funniest Actor in a Motion Picture (Leading Role)	Kevin Spacey	Nominated
American Society of Cinematographers	Outstanding Achievement in Cinematography in Theatrical Releases	Conrad Hall	Won
Art Directors Guild	Excellence in Production Design Award for Feature Film	Naomi Shohan, David Lazan, Catherine Smith	Nominated
Australian Film Institute	Best Foreign Film	Bruce Cohen, Dan Jinks	Won
Awards of the Japanese Academy	Best Foreign Film		Nominated
Belgian Syndicate of Cinema Critics	Grand Prix		Nominated
53rd British Academy Film Awards	Best Film	Bruce Cohen, Dan Jinks	Won
53rd British Academy Film Awards	Best Actor in a Leading Role	Kevin Spacey	Won
53rd British Academy Film Awards	Best Actress in a Leading Role	Annette Bening	Won
53rd British Academy Film Awards	Best Editing	Tariq Anwar, Christopher Greenbury	Won
53rd British Academy Film Awards	Best Cinematography	Conrad Hall	Won
53rd British Academy Film Awards	Anthony Asquith Award (Best Film Music)	Thomas Newman	Won
53rd British Academy Film Awards	David Lean Award	Sam Mendes	Nominated
53rd British Academy Film Awards	Best Screenplay – Original	Alan Ball	Nominated
53rd British Academy Film Awards	Best Performance by an Actor in a Supporting Role	Wes Bentley	Nominated
53rd British Academy Film Awards	Best Performance by an Actress in a Supporting Role	Thora Birch	Nominated
53rd British Academy Film Awards	Best Performance by an Actress in a Supporting Role	Mena Suvari	Nominated
53rd British Academy Film Awards	Best Sound	Scott Martin Gershin, Scott Millan, Bob Beemer, Richard Van Dyke	Nominated
53rd British Academy Film Awards	Best Production Design	Naomi Shohan	Nominated
53rd British Academy Film Awards	Best Make Up/Hair	Tania McComas, Carol A. O'Connell	Nominated
BMI Film & TV Awards	BMI Film Music	Thomas Newman	Won
Blockbuster Entertainment Awards	Favorite Actress – Drama	Annette Bening	Nominated
Blockbuster Entertainment Awards	Favorite Supporting Actor – Drama	Wes Bentley	Nominated
Blockbuster Entertainment Awards	Favorite Supporting Actress – Drama	Thora Birch	Nominated
Blockbuster Entertainment Awards	Favorite Actor – Drama	Kevin Spacey	Nominated
Blockbuster Entertainment Awards	Favorite Actress – Newcomer (Internet Only)	Mena Suvari	Nominated
Brit Awards	Soundtrack/Cast Recording		Won
Bodil Awards	Best American Film	Sam Mendes	Won
British Society of Cinematographers	Best Cinematography	Conrad Hall	Won
Directors Guild of America	Outstanding Directorial Achievement in Motion Pictures	Sam Mendes	Won
Chicago Film Critics Association Awards	Best Actor	Kevin Spacey	Won
Chicago Film Critics Association Awards	Best Director	Sam Mendes	Won
Chicago Film Critics Association Awards	Best Picture	Bruce Cohen, Dan Jinks	Won
Chicago Film Critics Association Awards	Most Promising Actor	Wes Bentley	Won
Chicago Film Critics Association Awards	Best Actress	Annette Bening	Nominated
Chicago Film Critics Association Awards	Best Cinematography	Conrad L. Hall	Nominated
Chicago Film Critics Association Awards	Best Screenplay	Alan Ball	Nominated
Cinema Audio Society	Outstanding Achievement in Sound Mixing for a Feature Film	Scott Millan, Bob Beemer, Richard Van Dyke	Nominated
57th Golden Globe Awards	Best Motion Picture – Drama	Bruce Cohen and Dan Jinks	Won
57th Golden Globe Awards	Best Director	Sam Mendes	Won
57th Golden Globe Awards	Best Screenplay	Alan Ball	Won
57th Golden Globe Awards	Best Actress – Drama	Annette Bening	Nominated
57th Golden Globe Awards	Best Actor – Drama	Kevin Spacey	Nominated
57th Golden Globe Awards	Best Original Score	Thomas Newman	Nominated
National Board of Review	Best Picture		Won
National Board of Review	Breakthrough Performance – Male	Wes Bentley	Won
Screen Actors Guild Award	Best Actor	Kevin Spacey	Won
Screen Actors Guild Award	Best Actress	Annette Bening	Won
Screen Actors Guild Award	Best Supporting Actor	Chris Cooper	Nominated
Screen Actors Guild Award	Best Ensemble	Kevin Spacey, Annette Bening, Thora Birch, Mena Suvari, Wes Bentley, Chris Cooper, Allison Janney, Peter Gallagher	Won

- AFI's 100 Years... 100 Movie Quotes
  - "Sometimes there's so much beauty in the world I feel like I can't take it, like my heart's going to cave in." – Nominated.
