= The Matrix =

1999 film by the Wachowskis

- Theatrical release poster
- Directed by: The Wachowskis (Note: Credited as The Wachowski Brothers)
- Written by: The Wachowskis
- Produced by: Joel Silver
- Starring: Keanu Reeves; Laurence Fishburne; Carrie-Anne Moss; Hugo Weaving; Joe Pantoliano
- Cinematography: Bill Pope
- Edited by: Zach Staenberg
- Music by: Don Davis
- Production companies: Village Roadshow Pictures; Groucho II Film Partnership; Silver Pictures
- Distributed by: Warner Bros. (worldwide); Roadshow Entertainment (Australia)
- Release dates: March 24, 1999 (Mann Village Theater); March 31, 1999 (United States); April 8, 1999 (Australia)
- Running time: 136 minutes
- Countries: United States; Australia
- Language: English
- Budget: $63 million
- Box office: $473.3 million

The Matrix is a 1999 science fiction–action film written and directed by the Wachowskis. The first installment in the Matrix film series, it stars Keanu Reeves, Laurence Fishburne, Carrie-Anne Moss, Hugo Weaving, and Joe Pantoliano. The film follows a disillusioned computer hacker Neo (Reeves) who discovers that the life he knows is an elaborate deception created by intelligent machines. He is recruited by underground insurgents Morpheus (Fishburne) and Trinity (Moss), to join the rebellion against the machines.

Following the success of the Wachowskis' 1996 film Bound, Warner Bros. gave the directing duo the go-ahead to make The Matrix. The film's action scenes were influenced by anime and martial arts films, particularly fight choreography and wire fu techniques from Hong Kong action cinema. Other influences include Plato's cave, 1990's Telnet hacker communities, and William Gibson's cyberpunk novel Neuromancer. The Matrix popularized terms such as the red pill, as well as a novel visual effect known as "bullet time" in which a character's heightened perception is represented by allowing the action within a shot to progress in slow motion while the camera appears to move through the scene at normal speed.

The Matrix was released in theaters in the United States on March 31, 1999, to widespread critical acclaim. Critics praised its innovative visual effects, action sequences, cinematography, and entertainment value. The film was a box office success, grossing over $460 million on a $63 million budget. It became the highest-grossing Warner Bros. film of 1999 and the fourth-highest-grossing film of that year. The Matrix received Academy Award nominations for Best Visual Effects, Best Film Editing, Best Sound and Best Sound Effects Editing, winning all four categories. It was also the recipient of numerous other accolades, including Best Sound and Best Special Visual Effects at the 53rd British Academy Film Awards. The Wachowskis were awarded Best Director and Best Science Fiction Film at the 26th Saturn Awards.

The Matrix is considered to be among the greatest science fiction films of all time. In 2012, the Library of Congress selected it for preservation in the United States National Film Registry for being "culturally, historically, and aesthetically significant". The film's success led to two sequels by the Wachowskis, The Matrix Reloaded and The Matrix Revolutions, both released in 2003. The Matrix franchise was further expanded through the production of comic books, video games, and an animated anthology film, The Animatrix. The franchise has also inspired books and theories expanding on some of the religious and philosophical ideas alluded to in the films. A fourth film, The Matrix Resurrections, was directed by Lana Wachowski and was released in 2021.

== Plot ==
In an unnamed city in 1999, Thomas Anderson, a computer programmer known as "Neo" in hacking circles, investigates the mystery of the "Matrix", bringing him to the attention of hacker Trinity. She tells him that Morpheus can answer Neo's questions. At his workplace, Neo is pursued by Agents led by Agent Smith, while Morpheus, able to somehow observe their movements, guides him by phone, but Neo ultimately surrenders.

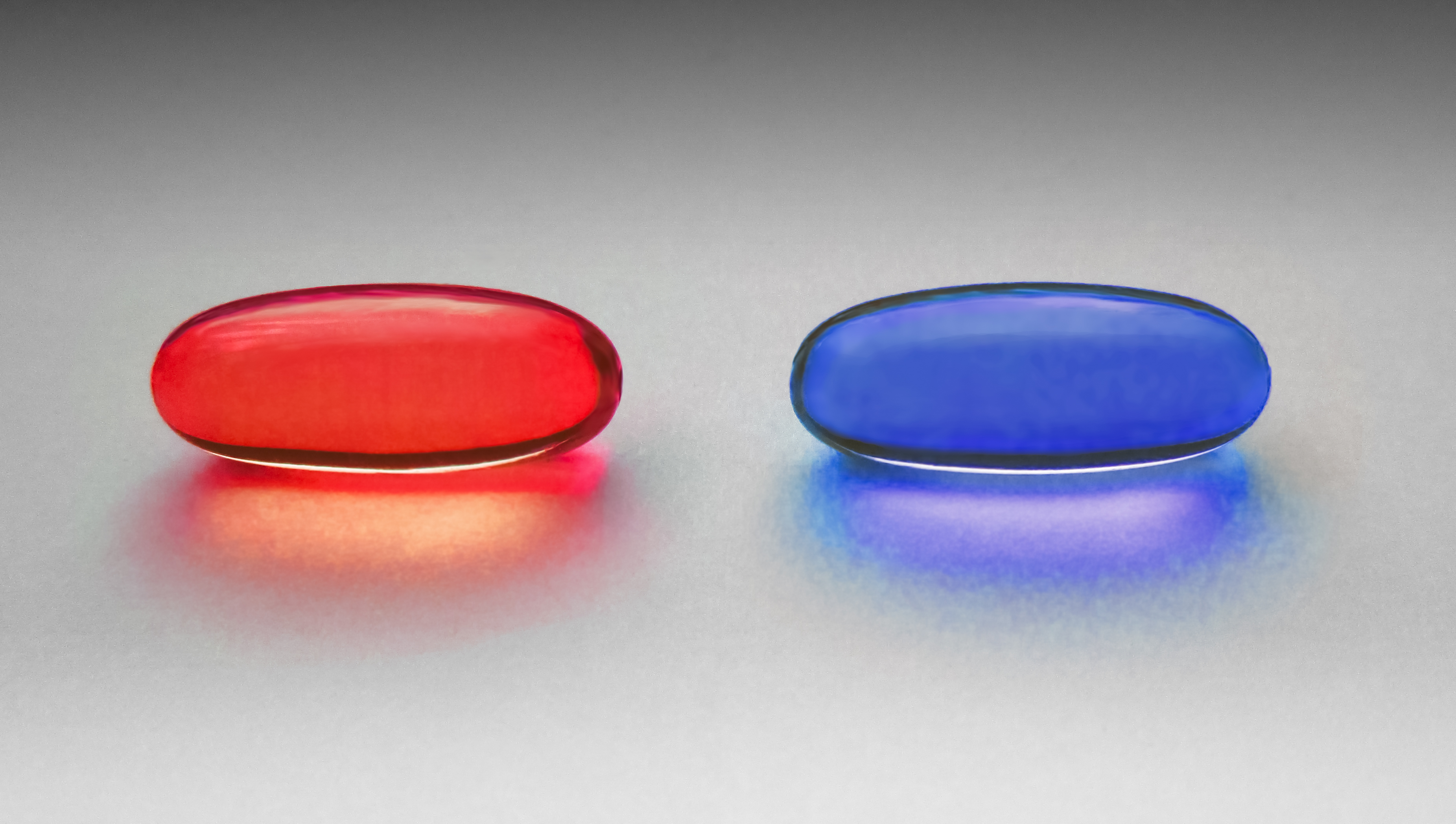
A red pill and blue pill symbolized Neo's choice between learning a life-changing truth or remaining in an unquestioned illusion appearing as ordinary reality.

The Agents interrogate Neo about Morpheus, but he refuses to cooperate. In response, they seal his mouth shut and implant a robotic tracking device in his belly button. Neo awakens at home, believing the encounter was a nightmare until Trinity and her companions remove the device and take him to Morpheus. Morpheus offers Neo a choice: a red pill to uncover the truth about the Matrix or a blue pill to return to his normal life. Neo takes the red pill and awakens in the real world, submerged in a mechanical pod and connected to invasive cables. He sees countless humans similarly encased and tended by machines before he is ejected from the building and rescued by Morpheus aboard the hovercraft Nebuchadnezzar.

Morpheus explains that the year is approximately 2199. In the 21st century, humanity lost a war against its artificially intelligent creations, leaving Earth a devastated ruin. Humans blackened the sky to deprive the machines of solar power, but the machines retaliated by creating vast fields of artificially grown humans, harvesting their bioelectric energy. To pacify their captives, they built the Matrix, a simulated reality modeled on human civilization at its peak. The remaining free humans founded an underground refuge called Zion, surviving on scarce resources. Morpheus and his crew hack into the Matrix to liberate others, exploiting its rules to gain superhuman abilities inside it. Even so, they remain outmatched by the Agents—sentient programs that protect the system—and death in the Matrix means death in the real world. Morpheus freed Neo because he believed him to be "the One", a prophesied figure destined to free humanity.

The crew enters the Matrix to seek guidance from the Oracle, who foretold of the One. She implies that Neo is not the One and warns him of an imminent choice between his life and Morpheus's. The crew is ambushed by Agents after being betrayed by Cypher, a disillusioned crew member who longs to return to the virtual comforts of the Matrix. Convinced of Neo's importance, Morpheus sacrifices himself to confront Smith and is captured. Meanwhile, Cypher exits the Matrix and begins disconnecting the others, killing them. Before he can kill Neo and Trinity, he is killed by Tank, a wounded crew member, who extracts the survivors.

Smith interrogates Morpheus to obtain access codes for Zion's mainframe, which would enable the machines to destroy the human resistance. Determined to rescue Morpheus, Neo re-enters the Matrix with Trinity. They free Morpheus, who escapes the Matrix with Trinity, but Smith intercepts Neo. Realizing his potential, Neo fights Smith as an equal and kills him. However, Smith is resurrected in a new body and kills Neo.

In the real world, machines called Sentinels attack the Nebuchadnezzar. Standing by Neo's body, Trinity confesses her love for him and reveals that the Oracle prophesied she would fall in love with the One. In the Matrix, Neo revives with the ability to perceive and manipulate its code. He effortlessly destroys Smith and escapes the Matrix just as the Nebuchadnezzar's electromagnetic pulse disables the Sentinels. Later, within the Matrix, Neo communicates with the system, vowing to show humanity a world of limitless possibilities, before flying away.

== Cast ==
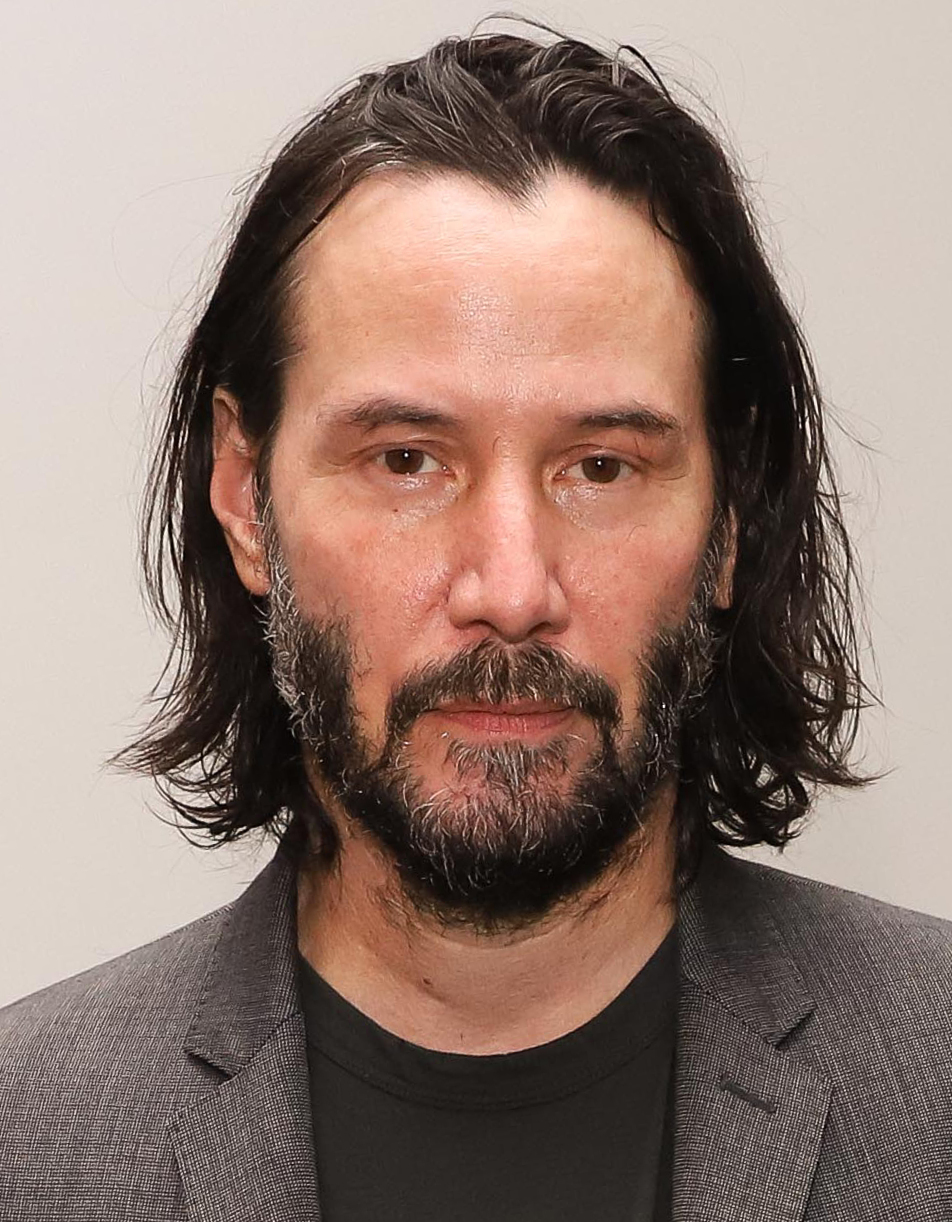
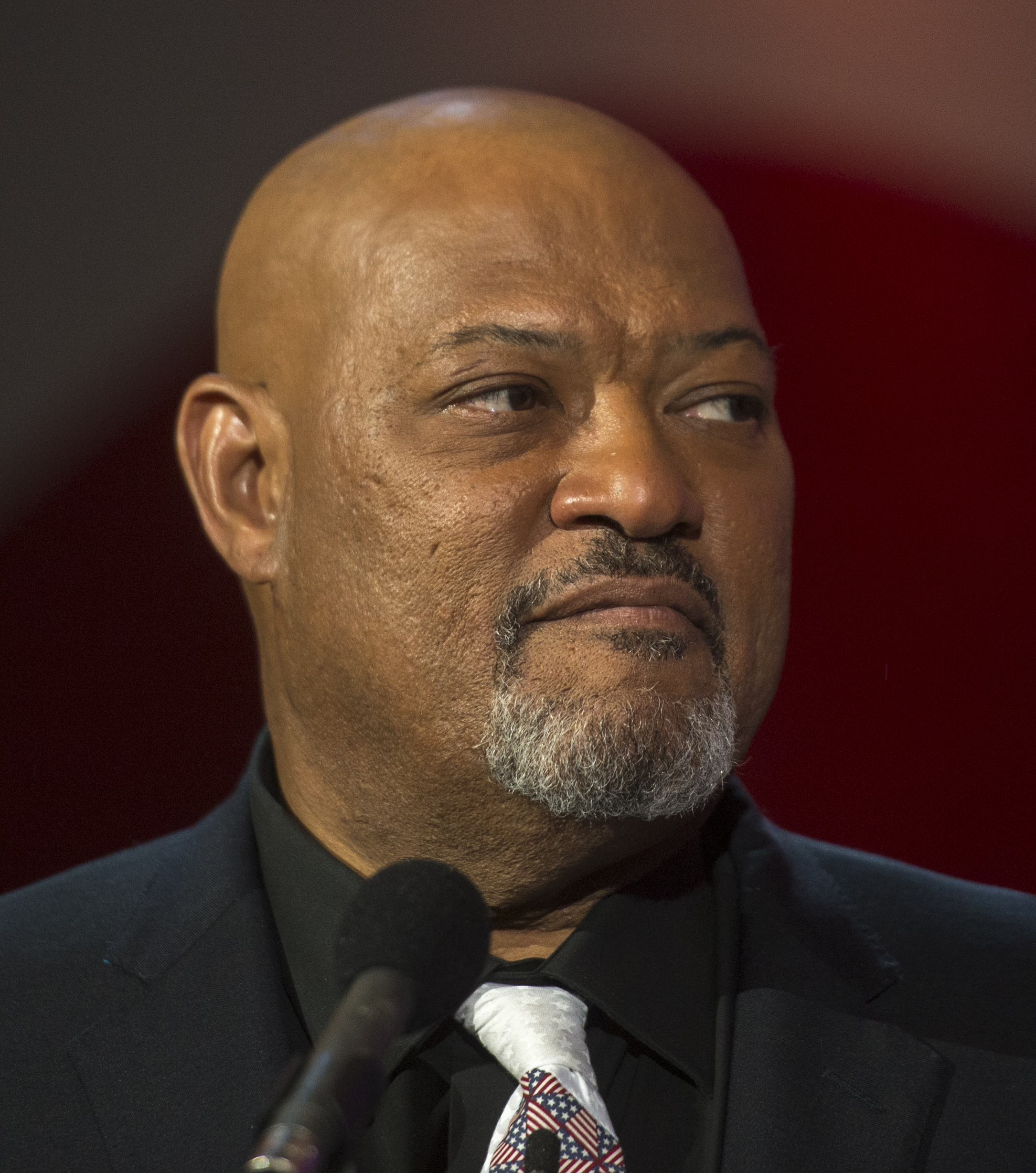
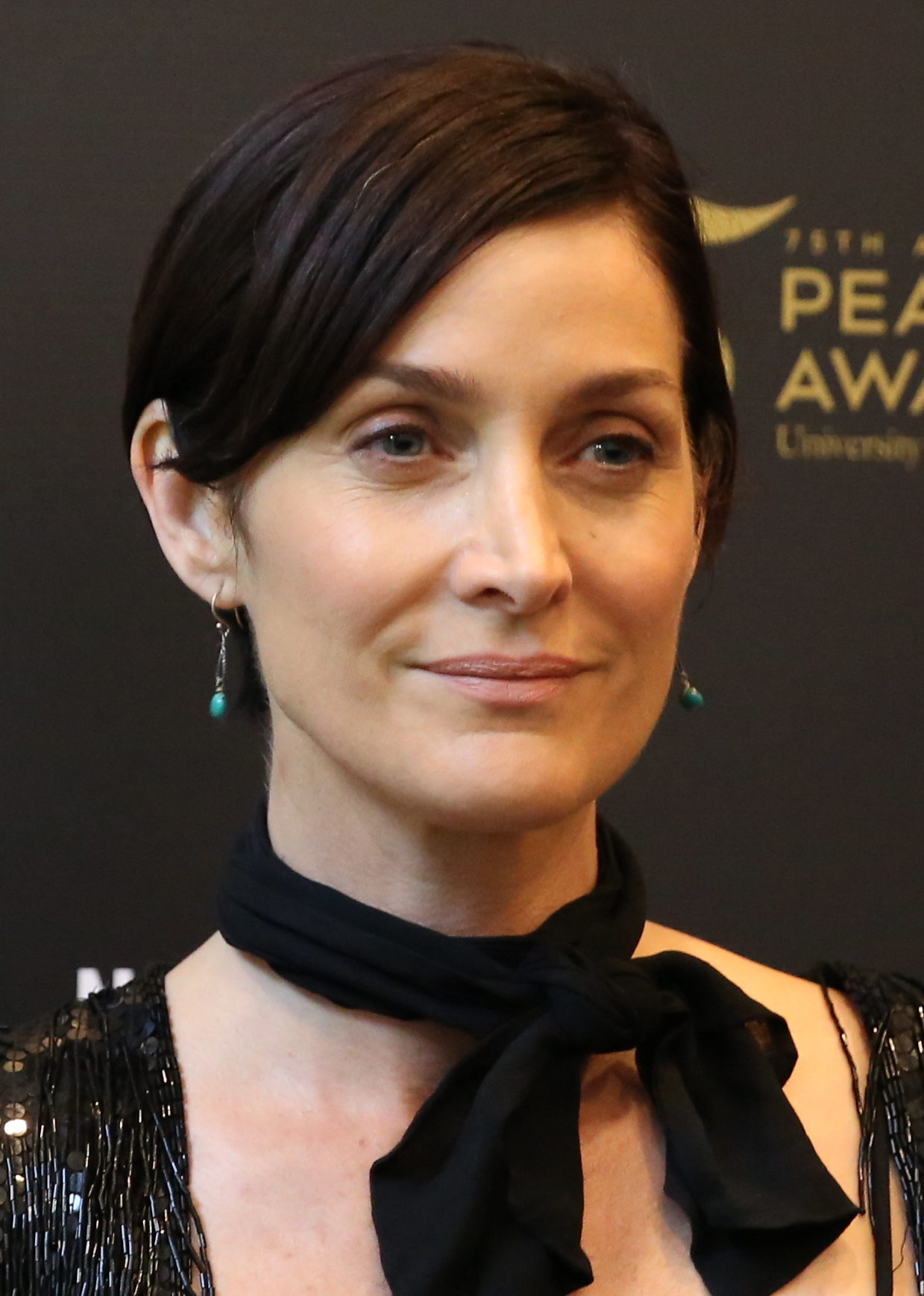
Top to bottom: Keanu Reeves, Laurence Fishburne, and Carrie-Anne Moss star as Neo, Morpheus and Trinity respectively.
- Keanu Reeves as Neo: A computer programmer, born Thomas Anderson, who secretly operates as a hacker named Neo. Reeves described his character as someone who felt that something was wrong and was searching for Morpheus and the truth to break free. Will Smith turned down the role of Neo to make Wild Wild West, because of skepticism over the film's ambitious bullet time special effects. He later stated he was "not mature enough as an actor" at that time, and that if given the role, he "would have messed it up". Nicolas Cage also turned down the part because of "family obligations". Warner Bros. sought Brad Pitt or Val Kilmer for the role. When both declined, Leonardo DiCaprio initially accepted the role, but ultimately turned it down because he did not want to do a visual-effects-heavy film directly after Titanic. The studio pushed for Reeves, who won the role over Johnny Depp, the Wachowskis' first choice. Lorenzo di Bonaventura said the screenplay was also sent to Sandra Bullock, with the possibility of rewriting Neo as woman.
- Laurence Fishburne as Morpheus: A human freed from the Matrix and captain of the Nebuchadnezzar. Fishburne said that once he read the script, he did not understand why other people found it confusing. However, he doubted that the film would ever be made, because it was "so smart". The Wachowskis instructed Fishburne to base his performance on the character Morpheus in Neil Gaiman's Sandman comics.
- Carrie-Anne Moss as Trinity: A human freed by Morpheus, a crewmember of the Nebuchadnezzar, and later Neo's romantic interest. After reading the script, Moss stated that at first, she did not believe she had to do the extreme acrobatic actions as described in the script. She also doubted how the Wachowskis would get to direct a movie with a budget so large, but after spending an hour with them going through the storyboard, she understood why some people would trust them. Moss mentioned that she underwent a three-hour physical test during casting, so she knew what to expect subsequently. The role launched Moss's acting career. Janet Jackson was initially approached for the role, but scheduling conflicts prevented her from accepting it. In an interview, Jackson stated that turning down the role was difficult for her, so she later referenced The Matrix in the 'Intro' and 'Outro' interludes on her album Discipline. Sandra Bullock, who was previously approached for the role of Neo, was also offered the role of Trinity, but she turned it down. Rosie Perez, Salma Hayek and Jada Pinkett Smith (who would later play Niobe in the sequels) also auditioned for the role.
- Hugo Weaving as Agent Smith: A sentient "Agent" program of the Matrix whose purpose is to destroy Zion and stop humans from getting out of the Matrix. Unlike other Agents, he has ambitions to free himself from his duties. Weaving stated that he found the character amusing and enjoyable to play. He developed a neutral accent for Smith, wanting him to sound neither robotic nor human, and said that the Wachowskis' voices also influenced Smith's voice. Jean Reno was offered the role, but declined, as he was unwilling to move to Australia for the production. Kyle MacLachlan also auditioned for the role.
- Gloria Foster as The Oracle: A prophet who still resides in the Matrix, helping the freed humans with her foresight and wisdom.
- Joe Pantoliano as Cypher: Another human freed by Morpheus, and a crewmember of the Nebuchadnezzar, but one who regrets taking the red pill and seeks to be returned to the Matrix, later betraying the rebels to Agent Smith. Pantoliano had worked with the Wachowskis prior to appearing in The Matrix, starring in their 1996 film Bound.
- Marcus Chong as Tank: The "operator" of the Nebuchadnezzar and Dozer's brother; they are both "natural" (as opposed to bred) humans, born outside of the Matrix.
- Paul Goddard as Agent Brown: One of two sentient "Agent" programs in the Matrix, who works with Agent Smith to destroy Zion and stop humans from escaping the system.
- Robert Taylor as Agent Jones: One of two sentient "Agent" programs in the Matrix who works with Agent Smith to destroy Zion and stop humans from escaping the system.
- Julian Arahanga as Apoc: A freed human and a crew member on the Nebuchadnezzar.
- Matt Doran as Mouse: A freed human and a programmer on the Nebuchadnezzar.
- Belinda McClory as Switch: A human freed by Morpheus, and a crew member of the Nebuchadnezzar.
- Anthony Ray Parker as Dozer: Pilot of the Nebuchadnezzar. He is Tank's brother, and like him was born outside of the Matrix.
- Rowan Witt as The Spoon Boy, a young prophet who has learnt how to manipulate the world of the Matrix. Seemingly wise beyond his years, he teaches Neo how to develop his powers and provides him with wisdom and motivation across the films and graphic novels.
- Ada Nicodemou as DuJour: A reference to the White Rabbit in Alice's Adventures in Wonderland.

== Production ==
=== Development ===
In 1994, the Wachowskis presented the script for the film Assassins to Warner Bros. Pictures. After reading the script, Lorenzo di Bonaventura, the company's president of production at the time, decided to purchase it and included two more films, Bound and The Matrix, in the contract. The Wachowskis first directed Bound, which became a critical success. Using this momentum, they asked to direct The Matrix. Keanu Reeves said that in an early draft of the script, "the Matrix avatar would be a different sex than the Zion reality", but he claimed the studio was not ready for that version.

In 1996, the Wachowskis pitched the role of Neo to Will Smith. Smith explained on his YouTube channel that the idea was for him to be Neo, while Morpheus was to be played by Val Kilmer. He later explained that he did not quite understand the concept and he turned down the role to instead film Wild Wild West. Brad Pitt also turned down the role of Neo. Madonna also turned down an undisclosed role, a decision she would later regret.

Joel Silver soon joined the project as producer. Although the film had key supporters, including Silver and Di Bonaventura, The Matrix was still a big gamble for Warner Bros., according to Screened. The studio was investing $60 million in a script by a pair of relatively inexperienced directors who wanted to use complicated special effects that had never been achieved before. The Wachowskis therefore hired the underground comic book artists Geof Darrow and Steve Skroce to create a 600-page, shot-by-shot storyboard for the entire film. The storyboard eventually earned the approval of Warner Bros., and the decision was made to film in Australia to make the most of the budget. Soon, The Matrix became a co-production of Warner Bros. and Village Roadshow Pictures. According to editor Zach Staenberg, after the production team sent an edit to studio executives of the film's first few minutes—featuring Trinity's encounter with police and Agents—the project had "total support" from Warner Bros.

=== Pre-production ===
The cast were required to be able to understand and explain the premise of The Matrix. French philosopher Jean Baudrillard's Simulacra and Simulation was required reading for most of the principal cast and crew. In early 1997, the Wachowskis had Reeves and Carrie-Anne Moss read Simulacra and Simulation, Kevin Kelly's Out of Control: The New Biology of Machines, Social Systems, and the Economic World, and Dylan Evans's ideas on evolutionary psychology before they read the film's script. Moss commented that she had difficulty with this process.

The Wachowskis had long been admirers of Hong Kong action cinema, so they decided to hire the Chinese martial arts choreographer and film director Yuen Woo-ping to work on fight scenes. To prepare for the wire fu, the actors had to train rigorously. The Wachowskis initially scheduled four months of training, beginning in October 1997. Yuen was at first optimistic about the training, but began to worry when he realized how unfit the actors were.

Yuen focused on developing each actor's strength. He built on Reeves's diligence, Fishburne's resilience, Weaving's precision, and Moss's grace. He designed Moss's moves to suit her deftness and lightness. Prior to pre-production, Reeves underwent spinal fusion surgery on his cervical spine to address disc problems that were causing him to lose his balance. He was still recovering by the time of pre-production, but he insisted on training, so Yuen let him practice punches and lighter moves. Reeves trained hard and even requested training on days off. However, he was unable to kick for two out of four months of training, and so did not kick much in the film. Weaving had to undergo hip surgery after he sustained an injury during training.

=== Filming ===
Foster Street location in Sydney used for the Heart O' the city hotel in the opening scene.

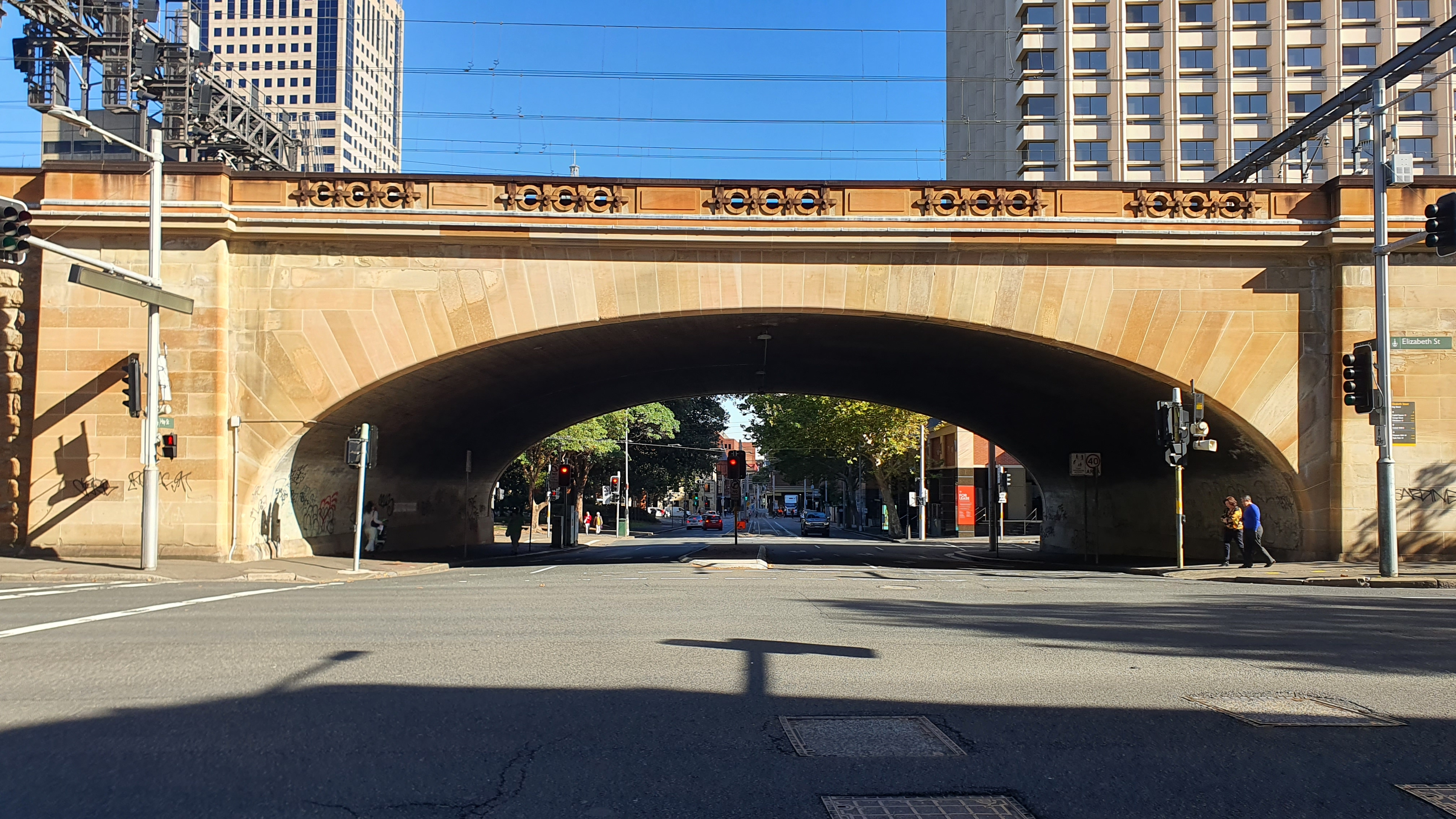
Campbell Street train bridge at the intersection of Elizabeth Street was one of the filming locations in Sydney.

All but a few scenes were filmed at Fox Studios in Sydney, as well as in the city proper. To maintain the impression of a generic city, recognizable landmarks were (mostly) not included. The filming helped establish New South Wales as a major film production center. Filming began in March 1998 and wrapped in August 1998; principal photography took 118 days. Some filming also occurred at Culver Studios.

Due to Reeves's neck injury (see above), some of the action scenes had to be rescheduled to wait for his full recovery. As a result, the filming began with scenes that did not require much physical exertion, such as the scene in Thomas Anderson's office, the interrogation room, or the car ride in which Neo is taken to see the Oracle. Locations for these scenes included Martin Place's fountain in Sydney, halfway between it and the adjacent Colonial Building, and the Colonial Building itself. During the scene set on a government building rooftop, the team filmed extra footage of Neo dodging bullets in case the bullet time process did not work. The bullet-time fight scene was filmed on the roof of Symantec Corporation building in Kent Street, opposite Sussex Street.

Moss performed the shots featuring Trinity at the beginning of the film and performed all the wire stunts herself. The rooftop set that Trinity uses to escape from Agent Brown early in the film was left over from the production of Dark City, which has prompted comments due to the thematic similarities of the films. During the rehearsal of the lobby scene, in which Trinity runs on a wall, Moss injured her leg and was ultimately unable to film the shot in one take. She stated that she was under a lot of pressure at the time and was devastated when she realized that she would be unable to do it.

The dojo set was built well before the actual filming. During the filming of these action sequences, there was significant physical contact between the actors, earning them bruises. Reeves's injury and his insufficient training with wires before filming meant he was unable to perform the triple kicks satisfactorily and became frustrated with himself, causing the scene to be postponed. The scene was shot successfully a few days later, with Reeves using only three takes. Yuen altered the choreography and made the actors pull their punches in the last sequence of the scene, creating a training feel.

The filmmakers originally planned to shoot the subway scene in an actual subway station, but the complexity of the fight and related wire work required shooting the scene on a set. The set was built around an existing train storage facility, which had real train tracks. Filming the scene when Neo slammed Smith into the ceiling, Chad Stahelski, Reeves's stunt double, sustained several injuries, including broken ribs, knees, and a dislocated shoulder. Another stuntman was injured by a hydraulic puller during a shot in which Neo was slammed into a booth. The office building in which Smith interrogated Morpheus was a large set, and the outside view from inside the building was a large, three story high cyclorama. The helicopter was a full-scale, lightweight mock-up suspended by a wire rope operated by a tilting mechanism mounted to the studio roof beams. The helicopter had a real minigun side-mounted to it, which was set to cycle at half its regular (3,000 rounds per minute) firing rate.

To prepare for the scene in which Neo wakes up in a pod, Reeves lost 15 pounds (7 kg) and shaved his whole body to give Neo an emaciated look. The scene in which Neo fell into the sewer system concluded the principal photography. According to The Art of the Matrix, at least one filmed scene and a variety of short pieces of action were omitted from the final cut of the film.

=== Sound effects and music ===
Dane A. Davis was responsible for creating the sound effects for the film. The fight scene sound effects, such as the whipping sounds of punches, were created using thin metal rods and recording them, then editing the sounds. The sound of the pod containing a human body closing required almost fifty sounds put together.

The film's score, The Matrix: Original Motion Picture Score, was composed by Don Davis. He noted that mirrors appear frequently in the film: reflections of the blue and red pills are seen in Morpheus's glasses; Neo's capture by Agents is viewed through the rear-view mirror of Trinity's motorcycle; Neo observes a broken mirror mending itself; reflections warp as a spoon is bent; the reflection of a helicopter is visible as it approaches a skyscraper. Davis focused on this theme of reflections when creating his score, alternating between sections of the orchestra and attempting to incorporate contrapuntal ideas. Davis' score combines orchestral, choral, and synthesizer elements; the balance between these elements varies depending on whether humans or machines are the dominant subject of a given scene. In addition to Davis' score, The Matrix: Music from the Motion Picture also features music from acts such as Rammstein, Rob Dougan, Rage Against the Machine, Propellerheads, Ministry, Lunatic Calm, Deftones, Monster Magnet, The Prodigy, Rob Zombie, Meat Beat Manifesto and Marilyn Manson.

=== Production design ===
In the film, the code that composes the Matrix itself is frequently represented as downward-flowing green characters. This code uses a custom typeface designed by Simon Whiteley, which includes mirror images of half-width kana characters and Western Latin letters and Arabic numerals. In a 2017 interview at CNET, he attributed the design to his wife, who is from Japan, and added, "I like to tell everybody that The Matrix's code is made out of Japanese sushi recipes". "The color green reflects the green tint commonly used on early monochrome computer monitors". Lynne Cartwright, the Visual Effects Supervisor at Animal Logic, supervised the creation of the film's opening title sequence, as well as the general look of the Matrix code throughout the film, in collaboration with Lindsay Fleay and Justen Marshall. The portrayal resembles the opening credits of the 1995 Japanese cyberpunk film, Ghost in the Shell, which had a strong influence on the Matrix series. It was also used in the subsequent films, on the related website, and in the game The Matrix: Path of Neo, and its drop-down effect is reflected in the design of some posters for the Matrix series. The code received the Runner-up Award in the 1999 Jesse Garson Award for In-film typography or opening credit sequence.

The Matrix's production designer, Owen Paterson, used methods to distinguish the "real world" and the Matrix in a pervasive way. The production design team generally placed a bias towards the Matrix code's distinctive green color in scenes set within the simulation, whereas there is an emphasis on the color blue during scenes set in the "real world". In addition, the Matrix scenes' sets were slightly more decayed, monolithic, and grid-like to convey the cold, logical, and artificial nature of that environment. For the "real world", the actors' hair was less styled, their clothing had more natural fibres, and the cinematographers used longer lenses to soften the backgrounds and emphasize the actors.

The Nebuchadnezzar was designed to have a patched-up look, instead of clean, cold, and sterile spaceship interior sets as used on productions such as Star Trek. The wires were made visible to show the ship's working internals, and each composition was carefully designed to convey the ship as "a marriage between Man and Machine". For the scene when Neo wakes up in the pod connected to the Matrix, the pod was constructed to look dirty, used and sinister. During the testing of a breathing mechanism in the pod, the tester suffered hypothermia in under eight minutes, so the pod had to be heated.

Kym Barrett, costume designer, said that she defined the characters and their environment by their costume. For example, Reeves's office costume was designed for Thomas Anderson to look uncomfortable, disheveled and out of place. Barrett sometimes used three types of fabric for each costume, and also had to consider the practicality of the acting. The actors needed to perform martial arts actions in their costumes, hang upside-down without people seeing up their clothing, and be able to work the wires while strapped into the harnesses. For Trinity, Barrett experimented with how each fabric absorbed and reflected different types of light, and was eventually able to make Trinity's costume mercury-like and oil-slick to suit the character. For the Agents, their costume was designed to create a secret service, undercover look, resembling the film JFK and classic men in black.

The sunglasses, a staple of the film's aesthetics, were commissioned for the film by designer Richard Walker from sunglasses maker Blinde Design.

=== Visual effects ===
The "bullet time" effect was created for the film. A scene would be computer-modeled to decide the positioning of the physical cameras. The actor then provided their performance in a chroma key setup, while the cameras were fired in rapid succession, with fractions of a second delay between each shot. The result was combined with CGI backgrounds to create the final effect at (0:33).

As for artistic inspiration for bullet time, I would credit Otomo Katsuhiro, who co-wrote and directed Akira, which definitely blew me away, along with director Michel Gondry. His music videos experimented with a different type of technique called view-morphing, and it was just part of the beginning of uncovering the creative approaches toward using still cameras for special effects. Our technique was significantly different because we built it to move around objects that were themselves in motion, and we were also able to create slow-motion events that 'virtual cameras' could move around—rather than the static action in Gondry's music videos with limited camera moves.

— John Gaeta

The film is known for popularizing a visual effect known as "bullet time", which allows a shot to progress in slow motion while the camera appears to move through the scene at normal speed. Bullet time has been described as "a visual analogy for privileged moments of consciousness within the Matrix", and throughout the film, the effect is used to illustrate characters' exertion of control over time and space. The Wachowskis first imagined an action sequence that slowed time while the camera pivoted rapidly around the subjects, and proposed the effect in their screenplay for the film. When John Gaeta read the script, he pleaded with an effects producer at Mass.Illusion to let him work on the project, and created a prototype that led to him becoming the film's visual effects supervisor.

The method used for creating these effects involved a technically expanded version of an old art photography technique known as time-slice photography, in which an array of cameras is placed around an object and triggered simultaneously. Each camera captures a still picture, contributing one frame to the video sequence, which creates the effect of "virtual camera movement"; the illusion of a viewpoint moving around an object that appears frozen in time.

The bullet time effect is similar but slightly more complicated, incorporating temporal motion so that, rather than appearing totally frozen, the scene progresses in slow and variable motion. The cameras' positions and exposures were previsualized using a 3D simulation. Instead of firing the cameras simultaneously, the visual effect team fired the cameras fractions of a second after each other, so that each camera could capture the action as it progressed, creating a super slow-motion effect. When the frames were put together, the resulting slow-motion effects reached a frame frequency of 12,000 per second, as opposed to the normal 24 frames per second of film. Standard movie cameras were placed at the ends of the array to pick up the normal speed action before and after. Because the cameras circle the subject almost completely in most of the sequences, computer technology was used to edit out the cameras that appeared in the background on the other side. To create backgrounds, Gaeta hired George Borshukov, who created 3D models based on the geometry of buildings and used the photographs of the buildings themselves as texture.

The photo-realistic surroundings generated by this method were incorporated into the bullet time scene, and algorithms based on optical flow were used to interpolate between the still images to produce a fluent dynamic motion; the computer-generated "lead in" and "lead out" slides were filled in between frames in sequence to get an illusion of orbiting the scene. Manex Visual Effects used a computer cluster running FreeBSD to render many of the film's visual effects.

Manex also handled creature effects, such as Sentinels and machines in real-world scenes; Animal Logic created the code hallway and the exploding Agent at the end of the film. DFilm managed scenes that required heavy use of digital compositing, such as Neo's jump off a skyscraper and the helicopter's crash into a building. The ripple effect in the latter scene was created digitally, but the shot also included practical elements, and months of extensive research were needed to find the correct kind of glass and explosives to use. The scene was shot by colliding a quarter-scale helicopter mock-up into a glass wall wired to concentric rings of explosives; the explosives were then triggered in sequence from the center outward, to create a wave of exploding glass.

The photogrammetric and image-based computer-generated background approaches in The Matrix's bullet time evolved into innovations unveiled in the sequels The Matrix Reloaded and The Matrix Revolutions. The method of using real photographs of buildings as texture for 3D models eventually led the visual effect team to digitize all data, such as scenes, characters' motions, and expressions. It also led to the development of "Universal Capture", a process that samples and stores facial details and expressions at high resolution. With these highly detailed collected data, the team was able to create virtual cinematography in which characters, locations, and events can all be created digitally and viewed through virtual cameras, eliminating the restrictions of real cameras.

== Release ==
=== Home media ===
The Matrix was released on DVD and LaserDisc in its original aspect ratio of 2.39:1 on September 21, 1999, in the US from Warner Home Video as well as in 1.33:1 aspect ratio in Hong Kong from ERA Home Entertainment. It was also released on VHS in both full screen and widescreen formats on December 7, 1999. After its DVD release, it was the first DVD to sell more than one million copies in the US, alongside Titanic. By 2000, the film went on to become the first to sell more than three million copies in the US. At that point, it became the top-selling DVD release of all time, holding this record for a few months before being surpassed by Gladiator. By November 10, 2003, one month after The Matrix Reloaded DVD was released, the sales of The Matrix DVD had exceeded 30 million copies. In the UK, the film debuted on both VHS and DVD formats on November 29, 1999. The Matrix sold more than 107,000 DVD copies in just two weeks, breaking Armageddon's record for being the country's best-selling DVD title. The Ultimate Matrix Collection was released on HD DVD on May 22, 2007, and on Blu-ray on October 14, 2008. The film was also released standalone in a 10th-anniversary edition Blu-ray in the Digibook format on March 31, 2009, ten years to the day after the film was released theatrically. In 2010, the film had another DVD release along with the two sequels as The Complete Matrix Trilogy. It was also released on 4K HDR Blu-ray on May 22, 2018. The film as part of The Matrix Trilogy was released on 4K Ultra HD Blu-ray on October 30, 2018.

=== Other media ===
The franchise also contains four video games: Enter the Matrix (2003), which contains footage shot specifically for the game and chronicles events taking place before and during The Matrix Reloaded; The Matrix Online (2004), an MMORPG which continued the story beyond The Matrix Revolutions; The Matrix: Path of Neo (2005), which focuses on Neo's journey through the trilogy of films; and The Matrix Awakens (2021), an interactive technology demonstration developed by Epic Games using Unreal Engine 5.

The franchise also includes The Matrix Comics, a series of comics and short stories set in the world of The Matrix, written and illustrated by figures from the comics industry. Most of the comics were originally presented for free on the official Matrix website; they were later republished, along with some new material, in two printed trade paperback volumes, called The Matrix Comics, Vol 1 and Vol 2.

== Reception ==
=== Box office ===
The Matrix grossed $27.8 million during its opening weekend, as well as earning $37.4 million in its first five days. It surpassed Lost in Space and Indecent Proposal simultaneously for having the biggest April and Easter opening weekends. The film also had the second-highest opening weekend for a spring starter film, trailing only behind Liar Liar. Three years later in 2002, The Matrix's records for having the largest April and Easter opening weekends would be taken by The Scorpion King and Panic Room respectively. Upon its opening, it had the highest opening weekend of any 1999 film until that point, easily topping Payback. Additionally, this was the biggest opening weekend for a Keanu Reeves film since Speed in 1994. It would go on to rank number one at the box office during its first weekend, beating out Forces of Nature, 10 Things I Hate About You, The Out-of-Towners, Analyze This and EDtv. The film would remain at the top of the box office for two weeks until it was overtaken by Life. During its fourth weekend, The Matrix briefly returned to the number one spot. The following week, the film would be displaced by Entrapment.

In the UK, The Matrix earned $4.9 million in its first three days, ranking it as the third-highest opening weekend for a Warner Bros. film, behind Batman Forever and Batman & Robin, while also delivering the third-highest opening weekend of the year, after A Bug's Life and Notting Hill. The film grossed $1.8 million in Taiwan, making the third-highest opening there, behind Armageddon and The Lost World: Jurassic Park. Additionally, it managed to surpass Lethal Weapon 4 for having the market's highest opening for Warner Bros. It also surpassed Eraser to secure the distributor's highest opening weekend in Germany, collecting $592,000.

In its original run, the film earned $171,479,930 (37.0%) in the United States and Canada and $292,037,453 (63.0%) in other countries, for a worldwide total of $463,517,383. In North America, it went on to become the fifth highest-grossing film of 1999 and the highest-grossing R-rated film of that year. Worldwide, it was the fourth-highest-grossing film of the year, after Star Wars: Episode I – The Phantom Menace, The Sixth Sense and Toy Story 2. The Matrix became the second-highest-grossing Warner Bros. film of all time, behind Twister. Overall, it was the third-highest-grossing R-rated film at the time, just after Saving Private Ryan and Terminator 2: Judgment Day. Following re-releases, the worldwide gross of the film is $466,621,824. In 2012, it was placed 122nd on the list of highest-grossing films of all time, and the second-highest-grossing film in the Matrix franchise after The Matrix Reloaded ($742.1 million).

=== Critical response ===
The Matrix was praised by many critics, as well as filmmakers, and authors of science fiction, especially for its "spectacular action" scenes and its "groundbreaking special effects". Some have described The Matrix as one of the best science fiction films of all time; Entertainment Weekly called The Matrix "the most influential action movie of the generation". There have also been those, including philosopher William Irwin, who have suggested that the film explores significant philosophical and spiritual themes. On review aggregator Rotten Tomatoes, the film holds an approval rating of 83% based on 210 reviews, with an average score of 7.7/10. The site's critical consensus reads, "Thanks to the Wachowskis' imaginative vision, The Matrix is a smartly crafted combination of spectacular action and groundbreaking special effects". At Metacritic, which assigns a rating out of 100 to reviews from mainstream critics, the film received a score of 73 based on 35 reviews, indicating "generally favorable reviews". Audiences polled by CinemaScore gave the film an average grade of "A−" on an A+ to F scale. It ranked 323rd among critics, and 546th among directors, in the 2012 Sight & Sound polls of the greatest films ever made.

Philip Strick commented in Sight & Sound, if the Wachowskis "claim no originality of message, they are startling innovators of method," praising the film's details and its "broadside of astonishing images". Roger Ebert gave the film three stars out of four: he praised the film's visuals and premise, but disliked the third act's focus on action. Similarly, Time Out praised the "entertainingly ingenious" switches between different realities, Hugo Weaving's "engagingly odd" performance, and the film's cinematography and production design, but concluded, "the promising premise is steadily wasted as the film turns into a fairly routine action pic ... yet another slice of overlong, high-concept hokum."

Jonathan Rosenbaum of the Chicago Reader reviewed the film negatively, criticizing it as "simpleminded fun for roughly the first hour, until the movie becomes overwhelmed by its many sources ... There's not much humor to keep it all life-size, and by the final stretch it's become bloated, mechanical, and tiresome."

Ian Nathan of Empire described Carrie-Anne Moss as "a major find", praised the "surreal visual highs" enabled by the bullet time (or "flo-mo") effect, and described the film as "technically mind-blowing, style merged perfectly with content and just so damn cool". Nathan remarked that although the film's "looney plot" would not stand up to scrutiny, that was not a big flaw because "The Matrix is about pure experience". Maitland McDonagh said in her review for TV Guide, the Wachowskis' "through-the-looking-glass plot... manages to work surprisingly well on a number of levels: as a dystopian sci-fi thriller, as a brilliant excuse for the film's lavish and hyperkinetic fight scenes, and as a pretty compelling call to the dead-above-the-eyeballs masses to unite and cast off their chains... This dazzling pop allegory is steeped in a dark, pulpy sensibility that transcends nostalgic pastiche and stands firmly on its own merits." Joe Williams of St. Louis Post-Dispatch earned a 3 out of 4 review, stating that "while the new sci-fi thriller The Matrix won't win any prizes for its script or its acting, it may be the most outlandish feat of futurism since Blade Runner."

Salon's reviewer Andrew O'Hehir acknowledged that although The Matrix is in his view a fundamentally immature and unoriginal film ("It lacks anything like adult emotion... all this pseudo-spiritual hokum, along with the over-ramped onslaught of special effects—some of them quite amazing—will hold 14-year-old boys in rapture, not to mention those of us of all ages and genders who still harbor a 14-year-old boy somewhere inside"), he concluded, "as in Bound, there's an appealing scope and daring to the Wachowskis' work, and their eagerness for more plot twists and more crazy images becomes increasingly infectious. In a limited and profoundly geeky sense, this might be an important and generous film. The Wachowskis have little feeling for character or human interaction, but their passion for movies—for making them, watching them, inhabiting their world—is pure and deep."

Filmmakers and science fiction creators alike generally took a complimentary perspective of The Matrix. William Gibson, a key figure in cyberpunk fiction, called the film "an innocent delight I hadn't felt in a long time", and stated, "Neo is my favourite-ever science fiction hero, absolutely." Joss Whedon called the film "my number one" and praised its storytelling, structure and depth, concluding, "It works on whatever level you want to bring to it". Darren Aronofsky commented, "I walked out of The Matrix ... and I was thinking, 'What kind of science fiction movie can people make now?' The Wachowskis basically took all the great sci-fi ideas of the 20th century and rolled them into a delicious pop culture sandwich that everyone on the planet devoured." M. Night Shyamalan expressed admiration for the Wachowskis, stating, "Whatever you think of The Matrix, every shot is there because of the passion they have! You can see they argued it out!". Simon Pegg said that The Matrix provided "the excitement and satisfaction that The Phantom Menace failed to inspire. The Matrix seemed fresh and cool and visually breathtaking, making wonderful, intelligent use of CGI to augment the on-screen action, striking a perfect balance of the real and the hyperreal. It was possibly the coolest film I had ever seen." Quentin Tarantino counted The Matrix as one of his twenty favorite movies from 1992 to 2009. James Cameron called it "one of the most profoundly fresh science fiction films ever made". Christopher Nolan described it as "an incredibly palpable mainstream phenomenon that made people think, Hey, what if this isn't real?"

== Accolades ==
The Matrix received Academy Awards for Best Film Editing, Best Sound Editing, Best Visual Effects and Best Sound. The filmmakers were competing against other films with established franchises, like Star Wars: Episode I – The Phantom Menace, yet they won all four of their nominations. The Matrix also received BAFTA awards for Best Sound and Best Achievement in Special Visual Effects, in addition to nominations in the cinematography, production design and editing categories. In 1999, it won Saturn Awards for Best Science Fiction Film and Best Direction. In February 2022, the film was named one of the five finalists for Oscars Cheer Moment as part of the Academy of Motion Picture Arts and Sciences' "Oscars Fan Favorite" contest, for the "bullet time" scene, finishing in fifth place.

=== Awards and nominations ===
Award	Category	Name	Outcome
Academy Awards	Best Film Editing	Zach Staenberg	Won
Academy Awards	Best Sound	John Reitz, Gregg Rudloff, David Campbell, David Lee	Won
Academy Awards	Best Sound Effects Editing	Dane A. Davis	Won
Academy Awards	Best Visual Effects	John Gaeta, Janek Sirrs, Steve Courtley, Jon Thum	Won
British Academy Film Awards	Best Cinematography	Bill Pope	Nominated
British Academy Film Awards	Best Editing	Zach Staenberg	Nominated
British Academy Film Awards	Best Production Design	Owen Paterson	Nominated
British Academy Film Awards	Best Sound	David Lee, John Reitz, Gregg Rudloff, David Campbell, Dane A. Davis	Won
British Academy Film Awards	Best Special Visual Effects	John Gaeta, Steve Courtley, Janek Sirrs, Jon Thum	Won
Saturn Awards	Best Science Fiction Film	—	Won
Saturn Awards	Best Director	The Wachowskis	Won
Saturn Awards	Best Writer	The Wachowskis	Nominated
Saturn Awards	Best Actor	Keanu Reeves	Nominated
Saturn Awards	Best Actress	Carrie-Anne Moss	Nominated
Saturn Awards	Best Supporting Actor	Laurence Fishburne	Nominated
Saturn Awards	Best Costumes	Kym Barrett	Nominated
Saturn Awards	Best Make-up	Nikki Gooley, Bob McCarron, Wendy Sainsbury	Nominated
Saturn Awards	Best Special Effects	John Gaeta, Janek Sirrs, Steve Courtley, Jon Thum	Nominated

== Thematic analysis ==
The Matrix is arguably the ultimate cyberpunk artifact.

— William Gibson

The Matrix draws from and alludes to numerous cinematic and literary works, and concepts from mythology, religion and philosophy, including the ideas of Hinduism, Buddhism, Christianity, Gnosticism and Judaism.

=== Film and television ===
The pods in which the machines keep humans have been compared to images in Metropolis, and the work of M. C. Escher. A resemblance to the eerie worlds of Swiss artist H. R. Giger was also recognized. The pods can be seen in Welcome to Paradox Episode 4 "News from D Street" from a 1986 short story of the same name by Andrew Weiner which aired on September 7, 1998, on the SYFY Channel and has a remarkably similar concept. In this episode, the hero is unaware he is living in virtual reality until he is told so by "the code man," who created the simulation and enters it knowingly. The Wachowskis have described Stanley Kubrick's 2001: A Space Odyssey as a formative cinematic influence, and as a major inspiration on the visual style they aimed for when making The Matrix. Reviewers have also commented on similarities between The Matrix and other late-1990s films such as Strange Days, Dark City and The Truman Show. (Note: Attributed to multiple references:) The similarity of the film's central concept to a device in the long-running series Doctor Who has also been noted. As in the film, the Matrix of that series (introduced in the 1976 serial The Deadly Assassin) is a massive computer system which one enters using a device connecting to the head, allowing users to see representations of the real world and change its laws of physics; but if killed there, they will die in reality. The action scenes of The Matrix were also strongly influenced by live-action films such as those of director John Woo. The martial arts sequences were inspired by Fist of Legend, a critically acclaimed 1995 martial arts film starring Jet Li. The fight scenes in Fist of Legend led to the hiring of Yuen as fight choreographer.

The Wachowskis' approach to action scenes drew upon their admiration for Japanese animation such as Ninja Scroll and Akira. Director Mamoru Oshii's 1995 animated film Ghost in the Shell was a particularly strong influence; producer Joel Silver has stated that the Wachowskis first described their intentions for The Matrix by showing him that anime and saying, "We wanna do that for real". Mitsuhisa Ishikawa of Production I.G, which produced Ghost in the Shell, noted that the anime's high-quality visuals were a strong source of inspiration for the Wachowskis. He also commented, "... cyberpunk films are very difficult to describe to a third person. I'd imagine that The Matrix is the kind of film that was very difficult to draw up a written proposal for to take to film studios". He stated that since Ghost in the Shell had gained recognition in America, the Wachowskis used it as a "promotional tool".

=== Literary works ===
The film makes several references to Lewis Carroll's Alice's Adventures in Wonderland. Comparisons have also been made to Grant Morrison's comic series The Invisibles, with Morrison describing it in 2011 as "(it) seemed to me (to be) my own combination of ideas enacted on the screen". Comparisons have also been made between The Matrix and the books of Carlos Castaneda.

The Matrix belongs to the cyberpunk genre of science fiction, and draws from earlier works in the genre such as the 1984 novel Neuromancer by William Gibson. For example, the film's use of the term "Matrix" is adopted from Gibson's novel, though L. P. Davies had already used the term "Matrix" fifteen years earlier for a similar concept in his 1969 novel The White Room ("It had been tried in the States some years earlier, but their 'matrix' as they called it hadn't been strong enough to hold the fictional character in place"). After watching The Matrix, Gibson commented that the way that the film's creators had drawn from existing cyberpunk works was "exactly the kind of creative cultural osmosis" he had relied upon in his own writing; however, he noted that the film's Gnostic themes distinguished it from Neuromancer, and believed that The Matrix was thematically closer to the work of science fiction author Philip K. Dick, particularly Dick's speculative Exegesis. Other writers have also commented on the similarities between The Matrix and Dick's work; one example of such influence is a Philip K. Dick's 1977 conference, in which he stated: "We are living in a computer-programmed reality, and the only clue we have to it is when some variable is changed, and some alteration in our reality occurs". (Note: Attributed to multiple references:)

=== Philosophy ===
In The Matrix, a copy of Jean Baudrillard's philosophical work Simulacra and Simulation, which was published in French in 1981, is visible on-screen as "the book used to conceal disks", and Morpheus quotes the phrase "desert of the real" from it. "The book was required reading" for the actors prior to filming. However, Baudrillard himself said that The Matrix misunderstands and distorts his work. Some interpreters of The Matrix mention Baudrillard's philosophy to support their claim "that the [film] is an allegory for contemporary experience in a heavily commercialized, media-driven society, especially in developed countries". The influence of The Matrixial Gaze, the philosophical-psychoanalytical concept of Bracha L. Ettinger on the archaic matrixial space that resists the field of simulacra, "was brought to the public's attention through the writings of art historians such as Griselda Pollock and film theorists such as Heinz-Peter Schwerfel". In addition to Baudrillard and Ettinger, the Wachowskis were also significantly influenced by Kevin Kelly's Out of Control: The New Biology of Machines, Social Systems, and the Economic World, and Dylan Evans's ideas on evolutionary psychology.

Philosopher William Irwin suggests that the idea of the "Matrix" – a generated reality invented by malicious machines – is an allusion to Descartes' "First Meditation", and his idea of an evil demon. The Meditation hypothesizes that the perceived world might be a comprehensive illusion created to deceive us. The same premise can be found in Hilary Putnam's brain in a vat scenario proposed in the 1980s. A connection between the premise of The Matrix and Plato's Allegory of the Cave has also been suggested. The allegory is related to Plato's theory of Forms, which holds that the true essence of an object is not what we perceive with our senses, but rather its quality, and that most people perceive only the shadow of the object and are thus limited to false perception.

The philosophy of Immanuel Kant has also been claimed as another influence on the film, and in particular how individuals within the Matrix interact with one another and with the system. Kant states in his Critique of Pure Reason that people come to know and explore our world through synthetic means (language, etc.), and thus, this makes it rather difficult to discern truth from falsely perceived views. This means people are their own agents of deceit, and so in order for them to know the truth, they must choose to openly pursue the truth. This idea can be examined in Agent Smith's monologue about the first version of the Matrix, which was designed as a human utopia, a perfect world without suffering and with total happiness. Agent Smith explains that, "it was a disaster. No one accepted the program. Entire crops [of people] were lost." The machines had to amend their choice of programming in order to make people subservient to them, and so they conceived the Matrix in the image of the world in 1999. The world in 1999 was far from a utopia, but still, humans accepted this over a suffering-free utopia. According to William Irwin, this is Kantian, because the machines wished to impose a perfect world on humans in an attempt to keep people content, so that they would remain completely submissive to the machines, both consciously and subconsciously, but humans were not easy to make content.

=== Religion and mythology ===
Andrew Godoski sees allusions to Christ, including Neo's "virgin birth", his doubt in himself, the prophecy of his coming, along with many other Christian references. Amongst these possible allusions, it is suggested that the name of the character Trinity refers to Christianity's doctrine of the Trinity. It has also been noted that the character Morpheus paraphrases the Chinese Taoist philosopher Zhuangzi when he asks Neo, "Have you ever had a dream, Neo, that you were so sure was real? What if you were unable to wake from that dream? How would you know the difference between the real world and the dream world?"

Matrixism is a fan-based, possibly satirical religion created as "the matrix religion".

=== Transgender themes ===
Years after the release of The Matrix, both of the Wachowskis came out as transgender women. The red pill has been likened to red estrogen pills. Morpheus's description of the Matrix creating a sense that something is fundamentally wrong, "like a splinter in your mind", has been likened to gender dysphoria. In the original script, Switch was a woman in the Matrix and a man in the real world, but this idea was removed.

In a 2016 GLAAD Media Awards speech, Lilly Wachowski said: "There's a critical eye being cast back on Lana, and I's [sic] work through the lens of our transness. This is a cool thing because it's an excellent reminder that art is never static." In 2020, Lilly said The Matrix was intended as an allegory for gender transition, but that "the corporate world wasn't ready". She said it was "all about the desire for transformation but it was all coming from a closeted point of view", but that she did not know "how present my transness was in the background of my brain" when the Wachowskis were writing it. In an interview with Variety in 2020, Reeves said the idea that the Matrix was an allegory for transgender identity "wasn't introduced to me when we started for production on the films."

== Legacy ==
=== Filmmaking ===
Following The Matrix, films made abundant use of slow motion, spinning cameras, and, often, the bullet time effect of a character freezing or slowing down and the camera dollying around them. The ability to slow down time enough to distinguish the motion of bullets was used as a central gameplay mechanic of several video games, including Max Payne, in which the feature was explicitly referred to as "bullet time". It was also the defining game mechanic of the game Superhot and its sequels. The Matrix's signature special effect, and other aspects of the film, have been parodied numerous times, in comedy films such as Deuce Bigalow: Male Gigolo (1999), Scary Movie (2000), Shrek (2001), Kung Pow! Enter the Fist (2002), and the horror action film House of the Dead (2003). Lastikman (2003); Marx Reloaded in which the relationship between Neo and Morpheus is represented as an imaginary encounter between Karl Marx and Leon Trotsky; and in video games such as Conker's Bad Fur Day. It also inspired films featuring a black-clad hero, a sexy yet deadly heroine, and bullets ripping slowly through the air; these included Charlie's Angels (2000) featuring Cameron Diaz floating through the air while the cameras flo-mo around her; Equilibrium (2002), starring Christian Bale, whose character wore long black leather coats like Reeves' Neo; Night Watch (2004), a Russian megahit heavily influenced by The Matrix and directed by Timur Bekmambetov, who later made Wanted (2008), which also features bullets ripping through air; and Inception (2010), which centers on a team of sharply dressed rogues who are able to enter other people's dreams by "wiring in". The original Tron (1982) paved the way for The Matrix, and The Matrix, in turn, inspired Disney to make its own Matrix with a Tron sequel, Tron: Legacy (2010). Also, the film's lobby shootout sequence was recreated in the 2002 Indian action comedy Awara Paagal Deewana.

=== Choreographers and actors ===
The Matrix had a strong effect on action filmmaking in Hollywood. The film's incorporation of wire fu techniques, including the involvement of fight choreographer Yuen Woo-ping and other personnel with a background in Hong Kong action cinema, affected the approaches to fight scenes taken by some subsequent Hollywood action films, moving them towards more Eastern approaches. The success of The Matrix created high demand for those choreographers and their techniques from other filmmakers, who wanted fights of similar sophistication: for example, wire work was employed in X-Men (2000) and Charlie's Angels (2000), and Yuen Woo-ping's brother Yuen Cheung-yan was choreographer on Daredevil (2003). The Matrix's Asian approach to action scenes also created an audience for Asian action films such as Crouching Tiger, Hidden Dragon (2000) that they might not otherwise have had.

Chad Stahelski, who had been a stunt double on The Matrix prior to directing Reeves in the John Wick series, acknowledged the film's strong influence on the Wick films, and commented, "The Matrix literally changed the industry. The influx of martial-arts choreographers and fight coordinators now makes more, and they are more prevalent and powerful in the industry than stunt coordinators. The Matrix revolutionized that. Today, action movies want their big sequences designed around the fights."

Carrie-Anne Moss asserted that prior to being cast in The Matrix, she had "no career". It launched Moss into international recognition and transformed her career; in a New York Daily News interview, she stated, "The Matrix gave me so many opportunities. Everything I've done since then has been because of that experience. It gave me so much". The film also created one of the most devoted movie fan-followings since Star Wars. The combined success of the Matrix trilogy, the Lord of the Rings films and the Star Wars prequels made Hollywood interested in creating trilogies. Stephen Dowling from the BBC noted that The Matrix's success in taking complex philosophical ideas and presenting them in ways palatable for impressionable minds might be its most influential aspect.

=== Cultural impact ===
The Matrix was also influential for its impact on superhero films. John Kenneth Muir in The Encyclopedia of Superheroes on Film and Television called the film a "revolutionary" reimagination of movie visuals, paving the way for the visuals of later superhero films, and credits it with helping to "make comic-book superheroes hip" and effectively demonstrating the concept of "faster than a speeding bullet" with its bullet time effect. Adam Sternbergh of Vulture.com credits The Matrix with reinventing and setting the template for modern superhero blockbusters, and inspiring the superhero renaissance in the early 21st century.

One popular quote, "Guns. Lots of guns," spoken by Neo near the climax of the film, was incorporated into John Wick: Chapter 3 – Parabellum as a line spoken by protagonist John Wick, also played by Reeves. The line was considered for use by screenwriters Patrick Casey and Josh Miller in the film Sonic the Hedgehog 3, which starred Reeves as the voice of Shadow the Hedgehog, but it was ultimately cut from that film's final script.

=== Modern reception ===
In 2001, The Matrix placed 66th in the American Film Institute's "100 Years...100 Thrills" list. In 2007, Entertainment Weekly called The Matrix the best science-fiction piece of media for the past 25 years. In 2009, the film was ranked 39th on Empire's reader-, actor- and critic-voted list of "The 500 Greatest Movies of All Time". The Matrix was voted as the fourth best science fiction film in the 2011 list Best in Film: The Greatest Movies of Our Time, based on a poll conducted by ABC and People. In 2012, the film was selected for preservation in the National Film Registry by the Library of Congress for being "culturally, historically, and aesthetically significant."

=== Red pill and blue pill ===
Scene from the 1990 film Total Recall where Dr. Edgemar (Roy Brocksmith) explains that swallowing a red pill is a "symbol of your desire to return to reality"

Historians of film note that the trope of a "red pill" as decisive in a return to reality made its first appearance in the 1990 film Total Recall, which has a scene where the hero (played by Arnold Schwarzenegger) is asked to swallow a red pill to symbolize his desire to return to reality from a dream-like fantasy.

The premise of The Matrix has been repurposed for multiple conspiracy theories and alt-right fringe groups. For example, some online men's rights groups use the term "redpill" to mean men realizing that they are supposedly being subjugated by feminism. The term has been used in discussion forums for right-wing topics such as Gamergate, white supremacy, incel subculture and QAnon. As of 2021, the verb "pill" and suffix "-pilled" had entered more mainstream use and had come to mean developing a sudden interest in something.

=== Sequels and adaptations ===
The film's mainstream success led to the making of two sequels, The Matrix Reloaded and The Matrix Revolutions, both directed by the Wachowskis. These were filmed back-to-back in one shoot and released on separate dates in 2003. The first film's introductory tale is succeeded by the story of the impending attack on the human enclave of Zion by a vast machine army. The sequels also incorporate longer and more ambitious action scenes, as well as improvements in bullet time and other visual effects.

Also released was The Animatrix, a collection of nine animated short films, many of which were created in the same Japanese animation style that was a strong influence on the live action trilogy. The Animatrix was overseen and approved by the Wachowskis, who only wrote four of the segments themselves but did not direct any of them; much of the project was developed by notable figures from the world of anime.

In March 2017, Warner Bros. was in the early stages of developing a relaunch of the franchise with Zak Penn in talks to write a treatment and interest in getting Michael B. Jordan attached to star. According to The Hollywood Reporter neither the Wachowskis nor Joel Silver were involved with the endeavor, although the studio would like to get at minimum the blessing of the Wachowskis. On August 20, 2019, Warner Bros. Pictures Group chairman Toby Emmerich officially announced that a fourth Matrix film was in the works, with Keanu Reeves and Carrie-Anne Moss set to reprise their roles as Neo and Trinity, respectively. The Matrix Resurrections was released in theaters and on HBO Max on December 22, 2021.

In September 2022, Danny Boyle was announced to be directing and producing a live immersive dance production of the film, entitled Free Your Mind, which debuted in October 2023 at the Aviva Studios in Manchester, England.

== See also ==
- Cyberspace
- Dialectical materialism
- Henosis
- Know thyself
- List of films featuring hallucinogens
- Metaverse
- Nineteen Eighty-Four
- Simulated reality
- Thought experiment
- Virtual reality
- Virtual world
- We, novel by Yevgeny Zamyatin

TV

- The Deadly Assassin, 1976 episode of Doctor Who in a virtual reality called the "Matrix"

Films

- World on a Wire, 1973 German science fiction series
- Tron, 1982 film
- Strange Days, 1995 film
- Dark City, 1998 film
- The Thirteenth Floor, 1999 film
- Existenz, 1999 film
- Computer Boy, 2000 parody
- The Meatrix, 2003 parody
- Code Lyoko, 2003 French animated series
- Infinity Train, 2019 American animated series

== Bibliography ==
- Babenko, Yelyzaveta (2011). Analysis of the Film the Matrix. GRIN Verlag. ISBN 978-3-640-91285-8.
- Clover, Joshua (2004). The Matrix. BFI. ISBN 978-1-84457-045-4.
- Condon, Paul (2003). The Matrix Unlocked: An Unauthorized Review of the Matrix Phenomenon. London: Contender Books. ISBN 978-1-84357-093-6.
- Irwin, William (2002). The Matrix and Philosophy: Welcome to the Desert of the Real. Open Court. ISBN 978-0-8126-9502-1.
- Jones, Steven E. (2006). Against Technology: From the Luddites to Neo-Luddism. Routledge. ISBN 978-0-415-97868-2.
- Pegg, Simon (2010). Nerd Do Well. Century. ISBN 978-1-84605-811-0.
- Toropov, Brandon; Hansen, Chad (2002). The Complete Idiot's Guide to Taoism. Penguin. ISBN 978-0-02-864262-8.
- Wachowski, Larry; Wachowski, Andy (2000). The Art of The Matrix. Titan. ISBN 978-1-84023-173-1.
- Wood, Aylish (2007). Digital Encounters. Routledge. ISBN 978-0-415-41066-3.
