= John Gaeta =

American visual effects designer (born 1965)

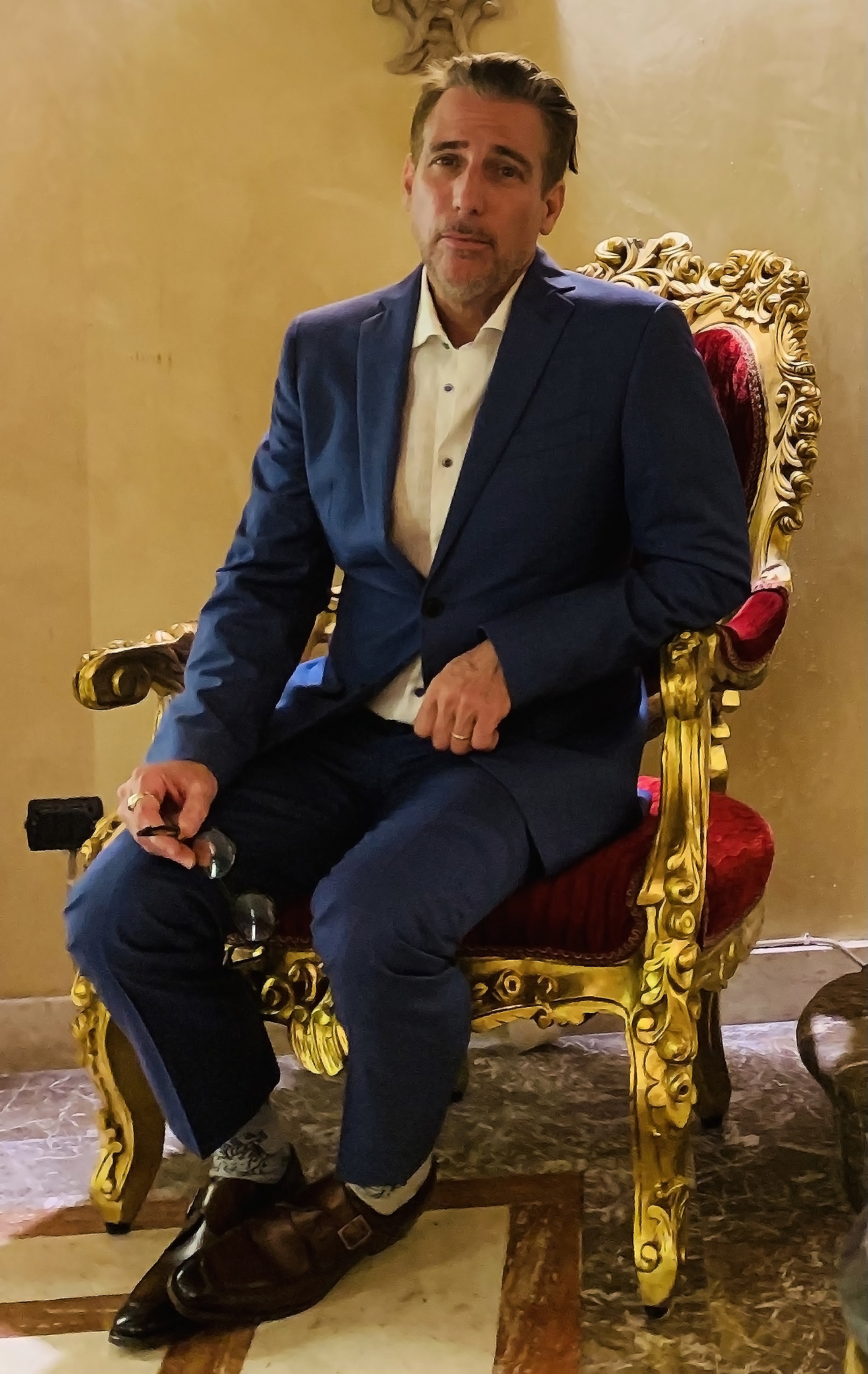
- Gaeta in 2021

John C. Gaeta (born 1965) is a designer and inventor, best known for his work on the Matrix film trilogy, where he advanced methods and formats known as bullet time.

== Career ==
John Gaeta was born in New York City and raised in Shoreham, Long Island. He pursued film studies at New York University's Tisch School of the Arts, earning a BFA with honors in 1989. He was introduced to the industry as a staff production assistant for the Saturday Night Live film unit, as well as doing camera and lighting work for a variety of media types and makers. Some of these early work experiences included holography with Jason Sapan, stop-motion animation with Peter Wallach, motion control with Bran Ferren, nature documentary, filming birdlife for National Geographic Explorer, timelapse and experimental photography in Namibia, Africa on Miramax's first feature, Dust Devil.

After co-supervising development for 3-D paint effect stylizations and LIDAR laser scanning (Reality Capture) for the film What Dreams May Come, which won the 1998 Academy Award for Best Visual Effects, Gaeta began his first solo effects supervision project for The Wachowskis' science fiction film, The Matrix.

In 2000, Gaeta won Best Visual Effects at the 72rd Academy Awards for his work on The Matrix, alongside Janek Sirrs, Steve Courtley and Jon Thum. The same year, Gaeta was brought on as the senior visual effects supervisor to complete the Matrix trilogy, including The Matrix Reloaded and The Matrix Revolutions. These films were created in parallel and featured over 2000 visual effects shots. Many were photographed and post-processed at a custom-built complex called ESC, located at the Alameda Naval Base near San Francisco. Overall conceptual design as well as research and development was initiated for the final two installments in January 2000. The centerpiece innovations and new methodologies presented through the Matrix universe were the creation of "Virtual Cinematography" and "Virtual Effects," phrases coined by Gaeta in 1999 and 2000.

In 2022, Gaeta took the role of Chief Creative Officer at Inworld AI, a company that powers the memories, behavior, and dialogue of AI NPCs and characters.

== Awards ==
- 2000 Academy Award for Visual Effects, for The Matrix
- 2000 BAFTA Awards for Best Achievement in Special Effects, for The Matrix
  - Above two shared with Steve Courtley, Janek Sirrs, Jon Thum
- 2000 MTV Movie Award, Best Action
- 2003 Visual Effects Society Award for Best Single Visual Effect of the Year in Any Medium, for The Matrix Reloaded (trailer "Top Crash"), shared with Dan Glass, Adrian De Wet, Greg Juby
- 2003 Visual Effects Society Award for Outstanding Visual Effects Photography in a Motion Picture for The Matrix Reloaded (U-cap facial photography), shared with Kim Libreri, George Borshukov, Paul Ryan
- Hollywood Film Festival: Hollywood Visual Effects Award, 2003
- Nominated, 2003 Visual Effects Society Award for Outstanding Visual Effects in a Visual Effects Driven Motion Picture for The Matrix Revolutions, shared with Kim Libreri, George Murphy, Craig Hayes
- 2014 Palo Alto International Film Festival, Muybridge Award for Innovation
