= Janek Sirrs =

Visual effects artist

- Born: October 20, 1965 (age 61)
- Other name: Janek Sims
- Occupation: Visual effects artist
- Years active: 1988–present

Janek Sirrs (born October 20, 1965) is a visual effects artist who is known for his work in films such as The Matrix, Batman Begins, The Avengers and The Hunger Games: Catching Fire.

== Oscars ==
Sirrs has won the Academy Award for Best Visual Effects once, with a further two nominations. All of the following are in this category:

- 72nd Academy Awards-The Matrix, shared with John Gaeta, Steve Courtley and Jon Thum. Won.
- 83rd Academy Awards-Iron Man 2, nomination shared with Ben Snow, Dan Sudick and Ged Wright. Lost to Inception.
- 85th Academy Awards-The Avengers, nomination shared with Dan Sudick, Jeff White and Guy Williams. Lost to Life of Pi.

== Selected filmography ==
- The Hunger Games: Sunrise on the Reaping (2026)
- Doctor Strange in the Multiverse of Madness (2022)
- Spider-Man: Far from Home (2019)
- Spider-Man: Homecoming (2017)
- Terminator Genisys (2015)
- The Hunger Games: Catching Fire (2013)
- The Avengers (2012)
- Iron Man 2 (2010)
- I Am Legend (2007)
- Batman Begins (2005)
- The Matrix Reloaded (2003)
- The Matrix (1999)
- Dr. Dolittle (1998)
- Mighty Joe Young (1998)
- The Truman Show (1998)
- Con Air (1997)
- Dante's Peak (1997)
- Mars Attacks! (1996)
- The Nutty Professor (1996)
- Executive Decision (1996)
- The Arrival (1996)
- White Squall (1996)
- Waterworld (1995)
- Braveheart (1995)
- The Quick and the Dead (1995)
- Last Action Hero (1993)
- The Muppet Christmas Carol (1992)
