= Steve Courtley =

Australian special effects artist

- Occupation: Special effects artist
- Years active: 1981-2003

Steve Courtley is an Australian special effects artist who is most known for his work in The Matrix films.

He won at the 72nd Academy Awards for his work on The Matrix in the category of Best Visual Effects. His Oscar was shared with John Gaeta, Janek Sirrs and Jon Thum.

He started his work on Australian films, such as Mad Max 2: The Road Warrior.

== Selected filmography ==
- The Matrix Revolutions (2003)
- The Matrix Reloaded (2003)
- The Matrix (1999)
- Armour of God II: Operation Condor (1991)
- Quigley Down Under (1990)
- Young Einstein (1988)
- Mad Max Beyond Thunderdome (1985)
- Mad Max 2: The Road Warrior (1981)
