= Naomi Shohan =

American production designer

Naomi Shohan is an American-based production designer. She has actively collaborated with actors such as Denzel Washington, Reese Witherspoon, Kevin Hart, Woody Harrelson, Jamie Foxx, Will Smith, Oprah Winfrey and Chloë Grace Moretz.

She has also worked strongly alongside directors like Francis Lawrence, Antoine Fuqua, Ava DuVernay, and Patrick Hughes. Her most widely recognized work can be seen in such films as American Beauty, I Am Legend, The Equalizer, The Equalizer 2, The Equalizer 3, Training Day, Constantine and A Wrinkle in Time (2018 film).

She studied for a time at the California Institute of the Arts, and sought higher education at Stony Brook University".
