= George Murphy (special effects artist) =

American special effects artist

- Occupation: Visual effects artist
- Years active: 1991-present
- Website: http://www.georgemurphy.com/

George Murphy is an American special effects artist. He is most known for his work in Forrest Gump for which he won an Oscar in the category of Best Visual Effects during the 67th Academy Awards. He shared his win with Allen Hall, Ken Ralston, and Stephen Rosenbaum. He also won the BAFTA award for Best Visual Effects at the 48th British Academy Film Awards for Forrest Gump.

== Filmography ==
- Death on the Nile (2020)
- Murder on the Orient Express (2017)
- Maleficent (2014)
- A Christmas Carol (2009)
- Eragon (2006)
- Constantine (2005)
- King Kong (2005)
- The Matrix Reloaded (2003)
- The Matrix Revolutions (2003)
- Imposter (2001)
- Planet of the Apes (2001)
- Mission to Mars (2000)
- Mercury Rising (1998)
- Starship Troopers (1997)
- Mission: Impossible (1996)
- Star Trek: First Contact (1996)
- Congo (1995)
- Forrest Gump (1994)
- Jurassic Park (1993)
- Death Becomes Her (1992)
- Hook (1991)

== TV shows ==
- Black Sails
