= Jon Thum =

Visual effects artist

- Occupation: Visual effects artist
- Years active: 1988-present

Jon Thum is a visual effects artist. He contributed work on The Matrix and The Chronicles of Narnia: Prince Caspian. As a supervisor at Prime Focus World in 2012, he led a 70-person team of artists to produce 650 visual effects shots for Dredd 3D.

== Oscars ==
Both of these are in the category of Best Visual Effects

- 72nd Academy Awards-The Matrix, shared with Steve Courtley, John Gaeta and Janek Sirrs. Won.
- 79th Academy Awards-Nominated for Superman Returns. Nomination shared with Mark Stetson, Neil Corbould and Richard R. Hoover. Lost to Pirates of the Caribbean: Dead Man's Chest.

== Selected filmography ==
- Dredd (2012)
- G.I. Joe: The Rise of Cobra (2009)
- The Chronicles of Narnia: Prince Caspian (2008)
- Quantum of Solace (2008)
- Superman Returns (2006)
- Charlie and the Chocolate Factory (2005)
- Troy (2004)
- The Matrix Reloaded (2003)
- Harry Potter and the Chamber of Secrets (2002)
- What Lies Beneath (2000)
- The Matrix (1999)
