= North Circular Road (disambiguation) =

North Circular Road is a 25.7-mile-long ring road around Central London in London, England.

North Circular Road may also refer to:

- North Circular Road (film), a 2015 Irish film
- North Circular Road, Dublin
- North Circular Road, Limerick
- A55 road (Northern Ireland)
