= 1st Visual Effects Society Awards =

US film and TV awards ceremony in 2003

1st Visual Effects Society Awards

February 19, 2003

Best Visual Effects - Motion Picture:
The Lord of the Rings: The Two Towers

The 1st Visual Effects Society Awards, given on February 19, 2003 at the Skirball Cultural Center, honored the best visual effects in film and television from 2002.

== Winners and nominees ==
(Winners in bold)

=== Film ===
Best Visual Effects in an Effects Driven Motion Picture	Best Supporting Visual Effects in a Motion Picture
**The Lord of the Rings: The Two Towers** – Jim Rygiel, Joe Letteri, Randall William Cook, Alex Funke: Men in Black II – John Berton, Tom Bertino, Bill Westenhofer, Erik Mattson; Star Wars: Episode II – Attack of the Clones – John Knoll, Ben Snow, Pablo Helman, Rob Coleman	**The Sum of All Fears** – Glenn Neufeld, Derek Spears, Dan Malvin, Al DiSarro: Frida – Jeremy Dawson, Daniel Schrecker; Gangs of New York – Michael Owens, Camille Geier, Edward Hirsh, Jon Alexander
Best Character Animation in a Live Action Motion Picture	Best Character Animation in an Animated Motion Picture
**The Lord of the Rings: The Two Towers** – Richard Baneham, Eric Saindon, Ken McGaugh, Bay Raitt: Harry Potter: "Dobby's Face" – David Andrews, Steven Rawlins, Frank Gravatt, Doug Smythe; Star Wars: Episode II – Attack of the Clones – Rob Coleman, Hal Hickel, Chris Armstrong, James Tooley	**Stuart Little 2** – Tony Bancroft, David Schaub, Eric Armstrong, Sean Mullen: Spirit: Stallion of the Cimarron – James Baxter
Best Special Effects in a Motion Picture	Best Matte Painting in a Motion Picture
**The Lord of the Rings: The Two Towers** – Steve Ingram, Blair Foord, Rich Cordobes, Scott Harens: Die Another Day – Chris Corbould	**Star Wars: Episode II – Attack of the Clones** – Paul Huston, Yusei Uesugi, Jonathan Harb: Gangs of New York – Brett Northcutt, Ronn Brown, Mathieu Raynault, Evan Pontoriero; The Lord of the Rings: The Two Towers – Yannick Dusseault, Max Dennison, Roger Kupelian, Mathieu Raynault
Best Models and Miniatures in a Motion Picture	Best Visual Effects Photography in a Motion Picture
**The Lord of the Rings: The Two Towers** – Richard Taylor, Paul Van Ommen, Matt Aitken: Die Another Day – John Richardson; Star Wars: Episode II – Attack of the Clones – Brian Gernand, Russell Paul, Geoff Campbell, Jean Bolte	**The Lord of the Rings: The Two Towers** – Alex Funke, Brian Van't Hul, Richard Bluck: Star Wars: Episode II – Attack of the Clones – Patrick Sweeney, Marty Rosenberg, Carl Miller, Fred Meyers; Stuart Little 2 – Earl Wiggins, Mark Vargo, Tom Houghton, Anna Foerster
Best Effects Art Direction in a Motion Picture	Best Compositing in a Motion Picture
**The Lord of the Rings: The Two Towers** – Alan Lee, Jeremy Bennett, Christian Rivers, Gino Acevedo: Minority Report – Alexander Laurant, Alex McDowell; Star Wars: Episode II – Attack of the Clones – Alex Jaeger, Doug Chiang, Erik Tiemens, Ryan Church	**The Lord of the Rings: The Two Towers** – Mark Lewis, GG Heitmann Demers, Alex Lemke, Alfred Murrle: Harry Potter and the Chamber of Secrets - Quiddich Match – Barbara Brennan, Jay Cooper, Kimberly Lashbrook, Dorne Huebler; Minority Report – Scott Frankel, Patrick Jarvis
Best Performance by an Actor in an Effects Film	
**The Lord of the Rings: The Two Towers** - Andy Serkis, Elijah Wood, Sean Astin: Adaptation - Nicolas Cage; Men in Black II - Will Smith

=== Television ===
Best Visual Effects in a Television Series	Best Visual Effects in a Television Miniseries, Movie or Special
**Firefly: "Serentity (Pilot)"** – Emile Smith, Rocco Passionino, Loni Peristere, Kristen Branan: Dinotopia: "Marooned & Making Good" – Guy Hudson, Sharon Fitzgerald, Frazer Churchill, David Hulin; Enterprise: "Shockwave, Part One" – Dan Curry, Ronald Moore, Liz Castro	**Dinotopia** – Mike McGee, Tim Webber, Alec Knox, Ben Morris: James Cameron's Expedition Bismarck – Dean Lewis; Stephen King's Rose Red – Robin Griffin, Stuart Robertson, Dion Hatch, Nelson Sepulveda
Best Visual Effects in a Commercial	Best Visual Effects in a Music Video
**Xbox: "Mosquito"** – William Bartlett, Andrew Daffy, Jake Mengers, Helen Mackenzie: Adidas: "Mechanical Legs" – Eric Barba, Bernd Angerer, Jeff Julian, Feli di Giorgio; Blockbuster Entertainment: "Prima Donna" – Scott Souter, Frank Petzold	**"So to Speak"** – Andrew Honacker, Steven Wagner, Sean Capone, Talon Nightshade: Linkin Park: "Points of Authority" – Emile Smith, Kyle Toucher, Andrew Orloff, Kristen Branan; Will Smith: "Black Suits Comin'" – Greg Strause, Colin Strause
Best Character Animation in a Live Action Televised Program, Music Video or Commercial	Best Matte Painting in a Televised Program, Music Video or Commercial
**Dinotopia** – Michael Eames, Quentin Miles, Dadi Einarsson, Ben White: Blockbuster Entertainment: "Kung Fu" – Scott Souter, Frank Petzold, Eric Reynolds, Todd LaBonte; Stargate SG-1: "Revelations" – James Tichenor, Craig Van Den Beggelaar, Kevin Little, Adam De Bosch Kemper	**Dinotopia** – Daren Horley, Jason Horley, Craig Lyn, Martin McRae: The Man Who Saved Christmas – Mark Fordham, Ian Britton, Graham Cunningham, Gudrun Heinze
Best Models and Miniatures in a Televised Program, Music Video or Commercial	Best Effects Art Direction in a Televised Program, Music Video or Commercial
**Enterprise: "Dead Stop"** – John Teska, Koji Kuramura, Pierre Drolet, Sean Scott: Gatorade: "Visitors" – James Waterhouse, Scott Lukowski, Eric Coon; Stephen King's Rose Red – Michael Joyce	**Adidas: "Mechanical Legs"** – Eric Barba, Bernd Angerer, Jeff Julian, Feli di Giorgio: Linkin Park: "Points of Authority" – Andrew Orloff, Kristen Branan, Emile Smith, Kyle Toucher
Best Compositing in a Televised Program, Music Video or Commercial	
**Dinotopia** – Christian Manz, Pedro Sabrosa, Nicolas Cotta, Tor Bjorn: Firefly: "Serentity (Pilot)" – Loni Peristere, Emile Smith, Kristen Branan, Chris Jones; Adidas: "Mechanical Legs" – Eric Barba, Bernd Angerer, Jeff Julian, Feli di Giorgio	
