= Visual Effects Society Award for Outstanding Visual Effects in a Photoreal Episode =

Annual award given by Visual Effects Society

The Visual Effects Society Award for Outstanding Visual Effects in a Photoreal Episode is one of the annual awards given by the Visual Effects Society starting in 2002. While the award's title has changed several time within this period, the recipient has always been a visual effects-heavy television episode. Episodes with more background effects work have their own category, the Outstanding Supporting Visual Effects in a Photoreal Episode. Until 2012, miniseries and television movies had their own category.

== Winners and nominees ==
=== 2000s ===
Best Visual Effects in a Television Series

Year	Program	Episode(s)	Nominees	Network
2002	Firefly	"Serenity"	Emile Smith, Rocco Passionino, Loni Peristere, Kristen Branan	Fox
2002	Dinotopia	"Marooned/Making Good"	Guy Hudson, Sharon Fitzgerald, Frazer Churchill, David Hulin	ABC
2002	Star Trek: Enterprise	"Shockwave, Part I"	Dan Curry, Ronald B. Moore, Liz Castro	UPN
2003	Buffy the Vampire Slayer	"Chosen"	Loni Peristere, Patti Gannon, Ronald Thornton, Chris Zapara	UPN
2003	Carnivàle	"Milfay"	David T. Altenau, Ariel V. Shaw, Thomas L. Bellissimo, Barbara J. Marshall	HBO
2003	ER	"Freefall"	Sam Nicholson, Kyle J. Healey, Eric Grenaudier, Anthony Ocampo	NBC
2003	Sea Monsters		Max Tyrie, Timothy Greenwood, Darren Byford, Mike Milne	BBC/Discovery Channel

Best Visual Effects in a Broadcast Series

Year	Program	Episode(s)	Nominees	Network
2004	Star Trek: Enterprise	"Storm Front, Part 2"	Dan Curry, Ronald B. Moore, David Takemura, Fred Pienkos	UPN
2004	Stargate Atlantis	"Rising"	John Gajdecki, Bruce Woloshyn, Jinnie Pak, Tara Conley	Sci Fi
2004	Stargate SG-1	"Lost City, Part 2"	James Tichenor, Shannon Gurney, Craig Van Den Biggelaar, Bruce Woloshyn	Sci Fi
2005	Rome	"The Stolen Eagle"	Barrie Hemsley, James Madigan, Duncan Kinnaird, Joe Pavlo	HBO
2005	Invasion	"Origin of Species"	Armen V. Kevorkian, John Karner, Neal Sopata	ABC
2005	Smallville	"Commencement"	Mat Beck, John H. Han, Trent Smith, John C. Wash	The WB
2006	Battlestar Galactica	"Exodus"	Gary Hutzel, Michael Gibson, Alec McClymont, Brenda Campbell	Sci Fi
2006	Prehistoric Park	"Episode 4"	George Roper, Matt Fox, Laurent Hugueniot, Kevin Spruce	Animal Planet/National Geographic
2006	Smallville	"Zod"	Mat Beck, Brian Ali Harding, Trent Smith, John C. Wash	The WB
2007	Fight for Life	"Episode 4"	Philip Dobree, Nicola Instone, Marco Iozzi, Matt Chandler	BBC One
2007	Battlestar Galactica	"Maelstrom"	Michael Gibson, Gary Hutzel, Michael Davidson, Kyle Toucher	Sci Fi
2007	Doctor Who	"Last of the Time Lords"	Dave Houghton, Will Cohen, Jean-Claude Deguara, Nicolas Hernandez	BBC One
2007	Heroes	"Four Months Ago..."	Eric Grenaudier, Mark Spatny, Diego Galtieri, Michael Enriquez	NBC
2007	Stargate Atlantis	"Adrift"	Mark Savela, Shannon Gurney, Erica Henderson, James Kawano	Sci Fi
2008	Battlestar Galactica	"Revelations"	Gary Hutzel, Michael Gibson, Doug Drexler, Kyle Toucher	Sci Fi
2008	Ghost Whisperer	"Ghost in the Machine"	Armen V. Kevorkian, Arthur J. Codron, Matt Scharf, Stefan Bredereck	CBS
2008	Heroes	"The Second Coming"	Eric Grenaudier, Mark Spatny, Diego Galtieri, Michael Cook	NBC
2008	Terminator: The Sarah Connor Chronicles	"Vick's Chip"	James Lima, Raoul Bolognini, Andrew Orloff, Steven Meyer	Fox
2009	Battlestar Galactica	"Daybreak"	Gary Hutzel, Michael Gibson, David R. Morton, Jess Tove	Syfy
2009	Defying Gravity	"Pilot"	Dale Fay, Jared Jones, Sam Nicholson, Mike Yip	ABC
2009	Fringe	"Earthling"	Robert Habros, Eric Hance, Andrew Orloff, Jay Worth	Fox
2009	Stargate Universe	"Air"	Shannon Gurney, Andrew Karr, Mark Savela, Craig Van Den Biggelaar	Syfy
2009	V	"Pilot"	Johnathan R. Banta, Karen Czukerberg, Andrew Orloff, Chris Zapara	ABC

Best Visual Effects in a Television Miniseries, Movie, or Special

Year	Program	Nominees	Network
2002	Dinotopia	Mike McGee, Tim Webber, Alec Knox, Ben Morris	ABC
2002	Expedition: Bismarck	Dean Lewis	Discovery Channel
2002	Rose Red	Robin Griffin, Stuart Robertson, Dion Hatch, Nelson Sepulveda	ABC
2003	Battlestar Galactica	Gary Hutzel, Kristen L. Branan, Emile E. Smith, Lee Stringer	Sci Fi
2003	Dinosaur Planet	Sebastien Dostie, Claude Precourt, Isabelle Riva	Discovery Channel
2003	Frank Herbert's Children of Dune ("Night 1")	Ernest Farino, Tim McHugh, Chris Q. Zapara, Glenn A. Campbell	Sci Fi
2003	Helen of Troy	Sam Nicholson, Adam Ealovega, Joshua Hatton, Tim Donahue	USA

Outstanding Visual Effects in a Broadcast Miniseries, Movie, or Special

Year	Program	Nominees	Network
2004	Virtual History: The Secret Plot to Kill Hitler	Jim Radford, Tom Beckwith Phillips, Simon Thomas, Loraine Cooper	BBC Two
2004	Earthsea	Peter V. Ware, Eric Grenaudier, Jared Jones, Earl Paraszczynec	Sci Fi
2004	The Last Dragon	Sirio Quintavalle, Alex Knox, Neil Glaseby	Animal Planet
2005	Walking with Monsters	Timothy Greenwood, Joanna Nodwell, Neil Glasbey, Darren Byford	BBC One
2005	Comet Collision!	John Gross, Nick Black, Christian Bloch, Casey Benn	Discovery Channel
2005	Super Bowl XXXIX ("Opening")	Benoit Girard, Jason Crosby, Jerome Morin, Chris Del Conte	Fox
2006	Nightmares & Dreamscapes ("Battleground")	Eric Grenaudier, Sam Nicholson, Mark Spatny, Adalberto Lopez	TNT
2006	Fight Science	Mat Beck, Kymber Lim, Manny Wong, Jack Matsumoto	National Geographic
2006	Hogfather ("Episode 1")	Oliver Money, Simon Thomas, Kim Stevenson, Stephen Jolley	Sky One
2007	Battlestar Galactica: Razor	Michael Gibson, Gary Hutzel, Sean M. Jackson, Pierre Drolet	Sci Fi
2007	Ben 10: Race Against Time (VFX Compilation)	Dina Benadon, Evan Jacobs, Brent Young, Chris Christman	Cartoon Network
2007	Doctor Who: Voyage of the Damned	Dave Houghton, Will Cohen, Nicolas Hernandez, Sara Bennett	BBC One
2007	Race to Mars ("Getting to Mars")	Manon Barriault, Jacques Levesque, Olivier Goulet, Benoit Girard	Discovery Channel Canada
2007	Tin Man ("Night One")	Lee Wilson, Lisa K. Sepp, Sébastien Bergeron	Sci Fi

Year	Program	Episode(s)	Nominees	Network
2008	John Adams	"Join or Die"	Steve Kullback, Eric Henry, Robert Stromberg, Jeff Goldman	HBO
2008	Doctor Who: The Next Doctor (Cyber King)		Dave Houghton, Marie Jones, Matt McKinney, Murray Barber	BBC One
2008	Generation Kill	"The Cradle of Civilization"	Adam McInnes, Anthony Bluff, Stephane Paris, David Sewell	HBO
2008	Knight Rider (Prometheus)		Sam Nicholson, Scott Ramsey, Chris Martin, Mike Enriquez	NBC
2009	Prep & Landing (Gadgets, Gloves and other Garish Gizmos)		Dorothy McKim, Scott Kersavage, David Hutchins, Kee Suong	ABC
2009	Alice	"Night 2"	Lee Wilson, Lisa Sepp-Wilson, Sebastien Bergeron, Les Quinn	Syfy
2009	Ben 10: Alien Swarm (Montage)		Evan Jacobs, Sean McPherson, Andrew Orloff	Cartoon Network
2009	Infestation		PJ Foley, Efram Potelle, James May, Dan DeEnremont	Syfy
2009	Skellig		Sara Bennett, Jenna Powell, David Houghton, Jean-Claude Deguara	Sky One

=== 2010s ===
Outstanding Visual Effects in a Broadcast Series

Year	Program	Nominees	Network
2010	Caprica	Michael Gibson, Gary Hutzel, Davey Morton, Jesse Mesa Toves	Syfy
2010	The Event	Victor Scalise, Jason Spratt, Diego Galtieri, Mike Enriquez	NBC
2010	No Ordinary Family	Andrew Orloff, Curt Miller, Paul Linden, Scott Tinter	ABC
2010	Stargate Universe	Mark Savela, James Rorick, Craig Vanden Biggelaar, Adam de Bosch Kemper	Syfy
2010	V	Andrew Orloff, Nathan Overstrom, Karen Czukerberg, Roberto Biagi	ABC
2011	Terra Nova	Kevin Blank, Colin Brady, Adica Manis, Jason Zimmerman	Fox
2011	Falling Skies	Roberto Biagi, Curt Miller, Andrew Orloff, Sean Tompkins	TNT
2011	Fringe	Robert Habros, Andrew Orloff, Jay Worth, Chris Wright	Fox
2011	Once Upon a Time	Nathan Overstrom, Laura Jones Turner, Andrew Orloff, Doug Ludwig	ABC
2011	Planet Dinosaur	Phil Dobree, Luke Dodd, Hasraf Dulull, Mark Sherwood	BBC One

Outstanding Visual Effects in a Broadcast Miniseries, Movie or Special

Year	Program	Nominees	Network
2010	The Pacific	John Sullivan, David Taritero, William Mesa, Marco Requay	HBO
2010	America: The Story of Us	Philip Dobree, Sophie Orde, Eloi Brunelle, Hasraf Dulull	History
2010	Inside the Perfect Predator	Philip Dobree, Richard Costin, Sam Meisels	BBC
2010	Last Day of the Dinosaurs	Arnaud Brisebois, Louis Desrochers, Alain Lachance, Marc A. Rousseau	Discovery Channel
2010	Prep & Landing: Operation: Secret Santa	Dorothy McKim, Kyle Odermatt, Andy Harkness, Adolph Lusinsky	ABC
2011	Inside the Human Body	Philip Dobree, Sophie Orde, Dan Upton	BBC
2011	The Bomber	Igor Gotsulyak, Dmitriy Kolesnik, Egor Olesov, Dmitry Ovcharenko	
2011	Finding Life Beyond Earth: Are We Alone?	Simon Clarke, Hasraf Dulull, Vikas Gandhi, Francisco Lima	PBS
2011	Gettysburg	J. David Everhart, Kent Johnson, Jon Rhinehardt, Jon Rosenthal	History
2011	Prep & Landing: Naughty vs. Nice	Kevin Deters, Dorothy McKim, John Murrah, Stevie Wermers-Skelton	ABC

Outstanding Visual Effects in a Broadcast Program

Year	Program	Episode(s)	Nominees	Network
2012	Game of Thrones	"Valar Morghulis"	Rainer Gombos, Steve Kullback, Sven Martin, Juri Stanossek	HBO
2012	Curiosity	"Battlefield Cell"	Nathan Larouche, Lon Molnar, Geoff Scott, Bojan Zoric	Discovery
2012	Falling Skies	"Worlds Apart (Falling Skies)"	James Hattin, Suzanne MacLennan, Curt Miller, Andrew Orloff	TNT
2012	Mockingbird Lane		Leslie Ekker, Jonah Hall, Livia Hanich, Jason Zimmerman	NBC
2012	Once Upon a Time	"The Stranger"	Dale Fay, Laura Jones Turner, Nathan Matsuda, Andrew Orloff	ABC
2013	Game of Thrones	"Valar Dohaeris"	Steve Kullback, Joe Bauer, Jörn Großhans, Sven Martin	HBO
2013	Agents of S.H.I.E.L.D.	"Pilot"	Mark Kolpack, Sabrina Arnold, David Altenau, H Haden Hammond	ABC
2013	Almost Human		Jay Worth, Robert Habros, Michael Cliett, David Beedon	Fox
2013	Battlestar Galactica: Blood & Chrome		Gary Hutzel, Michael Gibson, Derek Ledbetter, Heather McAuliff	Syfy
2013	Inseparable	"Chernobyl"	Egor Olesov, Egor Borschevsky, Dmitry Ovcharenko, Mykhailo Datsyk	

Outstanding Visual Effects in a Visual Effects-Driven Photoreal/Live Action Broadcast Program

Year	Program	Episode(s)	Nominees	Network
2014	Game of Thrones	"The Children"	Joe Bauer, Steve Kullback, Stuart Brisdon, Thomas Schelesny, Sven Martin	HBO
2014	Agents of S.H.I.E.L.D.		Mark Kolpack, Sabrina Arnold, Gary D'Amico, Kevin Lingenfelser, David Beedon	ABC
2014	Constantine	"A Feast of Friends"	Kevin Blank, Elizabeth Castro, Yafei Wu, Chris LeDoux	NBC
2014	The Flash		Armen V. Kevorkian, James Baldanzi, Jeremy Jozwik, Andranik Taranyan	The CW
2014	Hemlock Grove		Matt Whelan, Chris Brown, Todd Masters, Jonathan Banta, Eric McAvoy	Netflix

Outstanding Visual Effects in a Photoreal Episode

Year	Program	Episode(s)	Nominees	Network
2015	Game of Thrones	"The Dance of Dragons"	Joe Bauer, Steve Kullback Eric Carney, Derek Spears, Stuart Brisdon	HBO
2015	Battle for Sevastopol	"Sea Dogfight"	Dmitry Ovcharenko, Igor Klimovsky, Egor Borschevsky, Vladimir Mikheyenko	
2015	Childhood's End	"The Children"	Kevin Blank, Addie Manis, Niklas Jacobson, Glenn Melenhorst	Syfy
2015	Jonathan Strange & Mr Norrell	"Arabella"	Jean-Claude Deguara, Natalie Reid, Nicolas Hernandez, Sara Bennett	BBC One
2015	The Strain	"Identity"	Dennis Berardi, Luke Groves, Matt Glover, Trey Harrell, Warren Appleby	FX
2016	Game of Thrones	"Battle of the Bastards"	Joe Bauer, Steve Kullback, Glenn Melenhorst, Matthew Rouleau, Sam Conway	HBO
2016	Black Mirror	"Playtest"	Justin Hutchinson-Chatburn, Russell McLean, Grant S.L. Walker, Christopher Gray	Netflix
2016	The Expanse	"Salvage"	Bob Munroe, Clint Green, Kyle Menzies, Tom Turnbull	Syfy
2016	Stranger Things (Demogorgon)		Marc Kolbe, Aaron Sims, Olcun Tan	Netflix
2016	Westworld	"The Bicameral Mind"	Jay Worth, Elizabeth Castro, Bobo Skipper, Gustav Ahren	HBO
2017	Game of Thrones	"Beyond the Wall"	Joe Bauer, Steve Kullback, Christopher S. Baird, David Ramos, Sam Conway	HBO
2017	Agents of S.H.I.E.L.D.	"Orientation: Part 1"	Mark Kolpack, Sabrina Arnold, David Rey, Kevin Yuille, Gary D'Amico	ABC
2017	Legion	"Chapter 1"	John Ross, Eddie Bonin, Sébastien Bergeron, Lionel Lim, Paul Benjamin	FX
2017	Star Trek: Discovery	"The Vulcan Hello"	Jason Michael Zimmerman, Aleksandra Kochoska, Ante Dekovic, Mahmoud Rahnama	CBS All Access
2017	Stranger Things	"Chapter Nine: The Gate"	Paul Graff, Christina Graff, Seth Hill, Joel Sevilla, Caius Man	Netflix
2018	Lost in Space	"Danger, Will Robinson"	Jabbar Raisani, Terron Pratt, Niklas Jacobson, Joao Sita	Netflix
2018	Altered Carbon	"Out of the Past"	Everett Burrell, Tony Meagher, Steve Moncur, Christine Lemon, Joel Whist	Netflix
2018	Krypton	"The Phantom Zone"	Ian Markiewicz, Jennifer Wessner, Niklas Jacobson, Martin Pelletier	Syfy
2018	The Terror	"Go for Broke"	Frank Petzold, Lenka Likarova, Viktor Muller, Pedro Sabrosa	AMC
2018	Westworld	"The Passenger"	Jay Worth, Elizabeth Castro, Bruce Branit, Joe Wehmeyer, Michael Lantieri	HBO
2019	The Mandalorian	"Chapter 2: The Child"	Richard Bluff, Abbigail Keller, Jason Porter, Hayden Jones, Roy K. Cancino	Disney+
2019	Game of Thrones	"The Bells"	Joe Bauer, Steve Kullback, Ted Rae, Mohsen Mousavi, Sam Conway	HBO
2019	His Dark Materials	"The Fight to the Death"	Russell Dodgson, James Whitlam, Shawn Hillier, Robert Harrington	HBO
2019	Lady and the Tramp		Robert Weaver, Christopher Raimo, Arslan Elver, Michael Cozens, Bruno Van Zeebroeck	Disney+
2019	Lost in Space	"Ninety-Seven"	Jabbar Raisani, Terron Pratt, Niklas Jacobson, Juri Stanossek, Paul Benjamin	Netflix
2019	Stranger Things	"Chapter Six: E Pluribus Unum"	Paul Graff, Thomas F. Ford IV, Mike Maher, Martin Pelletier, Andi Sowers	Netflix

=== 2020s ===
Year	Program	Episode(s)	Nominees	Network
2020	The Mandalorian	"Chapter 9: The Marshal"	Joe Bauer, Abbigail Keller, Hal Hickel, Richard Bluff, Roy Cancino	Disney+
2020	Lovecraft Country	"Jig-a-Bobo"	Kevin Blank, Robin Griffin, Pietro Ponti, Francois Dumoulin	HBO
2020	Star Trek: Discovery	"Su'Kal"	Jason Michael Zimmerman, Aleksandra Kochoska, Ante Dekovic, Ivan Kondrup Jensen	CBS All Access
2020	Timmy Failure: Mistakes Were Made		Rich McBride, Leslie Lerman, Nicolas Chevallier, Anders Beer, Tony Lazarowich	Disney+
2020	Westworld	"Crisis Theory"	Jay Worth, Elizabeth Castro, Bruce Branit, Joe Wehmeyer, Mark Byers	HBO
2021	Foundation	"The Emperor's Peace"	Chris MacLean, Addie Manis, Mike Enriquez, Chris Keller, Paul Byrne	Apple TV+
2021	Loki	"Journey Into Mystery"	Dan DeLeeuw, Allison Paul, Sandra Balej, David Seager	Disney+
2021	Lost in Space	"Trust"	Jabbar Raisani, Terron Pratt, Juri Stanossek, Niklas Jacobson, Paul Benjamin	Netflix
2021	The Nevers	"Ignition"	Johnny Han, Jack Geist, Justin Mitchell, Emanuel Fuchs, Michael Dawson	HBO
2021	The Stand		Jake Braver, Phillip Hoffman, Laurent Hugueniot, Vincent Papaix	CBS All Access
2022	The Lord of the Rings: The Rings of Power	"Udûn"	Jason Smith, Ron Ames, Nigel Sumner, Tom Proctor, Dean Clarke	Amazon
2022	The Boys	"Payback"	Stephan Fleet, Shalena Oxley-Butler, Tristan Zerafa, Anthony Paterson, Hudson Kenny	Amazon
2022	House of the Dragon	"The Black Queen"	Angus Bickerton, Nikeah Forde, Sven Martin, Michael Bell, Michael Dawson	HBO
2022	Prehistoric Planet	"Ice Worlds"	Lindsay McFarlane, Fay Hancocks, Elliot Newman, Kristin Hall	Apple TV+
2022	Stranger Things	"The Piggyback"	Jabbar Raisani, Terron Pratt, Niklas Jacobson, Justin Mitchell, Richard E. Perry	Netflix

== Programs with multiple awards ==
6 awards

- Game of Thrones (HBO)

4 awards

- Battlestar Galactica (Syfy)

== Programs with multiple nominations ==
7 nominations

- Game of Thrones (HBO)

5 nominations

- Battlestar Galactica (Syfy)

3 nominations

- Agents of S.H.I.E.L.D. (ABC)
- Doctor Who (BBC)
- Stranger Things (Netflix)
- Westworld (HBO)

2 nominations

- Falling Skies (TNT)
- Fringe (Fox)
- Heroes (NBC)
- Lost in Space (Netflix)
- The Mandalorian (Disney+)
- Once Upon a Time (ABC)
- Smallville (The WB)
- Stargate Atlantis (Syfy)
- Stargate Universe(Syfy)
- Star Trek: Discovery (CBS All Access)
- Star Trek: Enterprise (UPN)
- V (ABC)
