= 5th Visual Effects Society Awards =

US film and TV awards ceremony in 2007

5th Visual Effects Society Awards

February 12, 2007

Best Visual Effects – Motion Picture:
Pirates of the Caribbean: Dead Man's Chest

The 5th Visual Effects Society Awards, given in Los Angeles on February 11, 2007, at the Kodak Grand Ballroom, honored the best visual effects in film and television of 2006. An edited version of the awards were broadcast on HDNet.

== Winners and nominees ==
(winners in bold)

=== Honorary Awards ===
Lifetime Achievement Award:

- **Dennis Muren**

=== Film ===
Outstanding Visual Effects in an Effects Driven Feature Motion Picture	Outstanding Supporting Visual Effects in a Feature Motion Picture
**Pirates of the Caribbean: Dead Man's Chest** – John Knoll, Jill Brooks, Hal Hickel, Charlie Gibson: Charlotte's Web – Karin Joy, John Berton, Blair Clark, John Dietz; The Fountain – Jeremy Dawson, Dan Schrecker, Mark Soper, Peter Parks	**Flags of Our Fathers** – Michael Owens, Matthew Butler, Bryan Grill, Julian Levi: Blood Diamond – Jeffrey Okun, Thomas Boland, Tim Crosbie, Neil Greenberg; Children of Men – Lucy Killick, Frazer Churchill, Tim Webber, Paul Corbould; The Da Vinci Code – Barrie Hemsley, Angus Bickerton, Gary Brozenich, Paul Riddle
Best Single Visual Effect of the Year	Outstanding Performance by an Animated Character in a Live Action Motion Picture
**Pirates of the Caribbean: Dead Man's Chest - Flying Dutchman Sequence)** – John Knoll, Ned Gorman, Jakub Pistecky, Tom Fejes: Children of Men - Birth Sequence – Tim Webber, Lucy Killick, Andy Kind, Craig Bardsley; Poseidon - Opening Sequence – Boyd Shermis, Rhonda Gunner, Kim Libreri, Philippe Rebours; X-Men: The Last Stand - The Phoenix Force Sequence – Eric Saindon, Cyndi Ochs, GG Heitmann, Roger Shortt	**Pirates of the Caribbean: Dead Man's Chest - Davy Jones** – Steve Walton, Jung-Seung Hong, Marc Chu, James Tooley: Charlotte's Web - Templeton – Todd Labonte, Jason Armstrong, Sven Jensen, David Richard Nelson; Charlotte's Web - Wilbur – Grant Adam, Daniel Fotheringham, Avi Goodman, Paul Buckley
Outstanding Performance by an Animated Character in an Animated Motion Picture	Outstanding Created Environment in a Live Action Motion Picture
**Cars - Mater** – Larry the Cable Guy, Mike Krummhoefener, Tom Sanocki, Nancy Kato: Happy Feet - Mumble's Banishment – Damien Gray, Tim Gibson, Carl Prud 'Homme; Monster House - House – Umberto Lazzari, Michael Kimmel, Kui Han Lee, Owen Demers	**Pirates of the Caribbean: Dead Man's Chest** – Chris Stoski, Susumu Yukuhiro, Jack Mongovan, Greg Salter: Mission: Impossible III – Russell Earl, Richard Bluff, Giles Hancock, Dennis Martin; Poseidon – Mohen Leo, Daniel Pearson, Willi Geiger, Matt Brumit
Outstanding Models and Miniatures in a Feature Motion Picture	Outstanding Compositing in a Feature Motion Picture
**Pirates of the Caribbean: Dead Man's Chest** – Bruce Holcomb, Ron Woodall, Charlie Bailey, Carl Miller: The Good Shepherd – Matthew Gratzner, Forest Fischer, Enrico Altmann, Leigh-Alexandra Jacob; V For Vendetta – Jose Granell, Nigel Stone	**Pirates of the Caribbean: Dead Man's Chest** – Eddie Pasquarello, Francois Lambert, Jeff Sutherland, Tory Mercer: The Da Vinci Code - Saint Sulpice Sequence – Mathew Krentz, Jordan Benwick, Enrico Perei, Rafal Kaniewski; Poseidon – Scott Younkin, Janeen Elliott, Brian Connor, Mark Nettleton
Outstanding Special Effects in a Feature Motion Picture	
**Casino Royale** – Chris Corbould, Peter Notley, Ian Lowe, Roy Quinn: Superman Returns – Neil Corbould, David Brighton, David Young, Robert Heggie	

=== Television ===
Outstanding Visual Effects in a Broadcast Series	Outstanding Supporting Visual Effects in a Broadcast Program
**Battlestar Galactica - Episode 303b - Exodus** – Gary Hutzel, Michael Gibson, Alec McClymont, Brenda Campbell: Prehistoric Park - Episode 4 – George Roper, Matt Fox, Laurent Hugueniot, Kevin Spruce; Smallville - Season 6 - Episode 1 - Zod – Mat Beck, Brian Harding, Trent Smith, John Walsh	**ER - Scoop and Run** – Sam Nicholson, Scott Ramsey, Adam Ealovega, Anthony Ocampo: Alias - Reprisal/All the Time in the World – Kevin Blank, Jay Worth, Steve Fong, Kevin Kutchaver; Commander in Chief - Ep 112 - The Wind Beneath Her Wings – Mark Kolpack, Adam Ealovega, Mark Spatny, Mike Enriquez
Outstanding Visual Effects in a Broadcast Miniseries, Movie or Special	Outstanding Visual Effects in a Commercial
**Nightmares and Dreamscapes - Battleground** – Eric Grenaudier, Sam Nicholson, Mark Spatny, Adalberto Lopez: Fight Science – Mat Beck, Kymber Lim, Manny Wong, Jack Matsumoto; The Hogfather - Episode 1 – Oliver Money, Simon Thomas, Kim Stevenson, Stephen Jolley	**Travelers - Snowball** – Dan Lemmon, Eileen Moran, R. Christopher White, Paul Story: Rexona - Go Wild – Andy Boyd, Stephanie Allender, Dan Seddon, Abby Orchard; Sears Tools - Arboretum – Rich Rama, Cedric Nicolas, Laurent Ledru
Outstanding Visual Effects in a Music Video	Outstanding Performance by an Animated Character in a Live Action Broadcast Program, Commercial or Music Video
**U2 and Green Day – "The Saints Are Coming"** – Matt Winkel, Ben Looram, Wayne England, Graham Fyffe: Killers - Bones – Chas Jarrett, Dave Child, Paul O'Shea, Andrew Bell	**GEICO** - Chat – David Hulin, Seth Gollub, Andy Walker, Jenny Bischsel: Battlestar Galactica - Episode 217 - Downloaded – Ryan Cronin, Louie Hinayo, Andy Asperin, Trevor Adams; Doctor Who - Episode 2, Series 2 – Nicholas Hernandez, Jean Claude Deguara, Neil Roche, Jean-Yves Adouard
Outstanding Created Environment in a Live Action Broadcast Program, Commercial or Music Video	Outstanding Models and Miniatures in a Broadcast Program, Commercial or Music Video
**Elisabeth - Episode 1** – Dave Bowman, Jimmy Kidell, Russell Horth, Gurel Mehmet: Coke - The Greatest Gift – David Hulin, Nathan Hughes, Jenny Bichsel, Andy Walker; ESPN - Monday Night Football Remote Open – Luke McDonald, Danny Braet, Minory Sasaki, Josh McGuire	**Battlestar Galactica -Season 2 - Episode 218 - Resurrection Ship, Part 2** – Steve Graves, Jose Peretz, Mark Shimer, Chris Zapara: Commander in Chief - Ep 112 - Air Force One – Mike Enriquez; Dodge - Fairy – Matthew Gratzner, Forest Fischer, Jon Warren, Scott Schneider
Outstanding Compositing in a Broadcast Program, Commercial or Music Video	
**Travelers - Snowball** – Laure Lacroix, Lyse Beck, Steve McGillen, Matt Holland: Battlestar Galactica -Season 2 - Episode 218 - Resurrection Ship, Part 2 – Lane Jolly, Don Kim, Matt Smith, Chris Zapara; Coke - The Greatest Gift – Murray Butler, MaryAnne Lauric, Nathan Hughes, Pedro Sabrosa; Sports Heaven – Geoff McAuliffe, Yafei Wu, Robert Sethi, Jimi Simmons	

=== Other categories ===
Outstanding Real Time Visuals in a Video Game	Outstanding Visual Effects in a Special Venue Project
**Fight Night Round 3** – Christopher Sjoholm, Kat Kelly Hayduk, Rob Hilson, Celia Jepson	**Roving Mars** – Alan Markowitz, Dan Maas, Jeremy Nicolaides, Johnathan Banta: Fields of Freedom – Sam Nicholson, Scott Ramsey, Adam Ealovega, Jon Craig; Greece, Secrets of the Past – Craig Barron, Ken Rogerson, Glenn Cotter, Chris Evans
