= Steve Bassett =

Steve Bassett is the name of:

== People ==
- Steve Bassett (actor), American actor, known as portrayer of Seth Snyder in As the World Turns
- Steve Bassett (musician), music collaborator with Robbin Thompson
- Steve Bassett (advertising), creative director of the Martin Agency who contributed to GEICO Gecko, the company mascot

== Characters ==
- Steve Bassett, a fictional character of the British soap opera Coronation Street
- Lt. Steve Bassett, a fictional character of the 1936 American film Navy Born
