= 11th Visual Effects Society Awards =

US film and TV awards ceremony in 2013

11th Visual Effects Society Awards

February 5, 2013

Best Visual Effects in a Visual Effects Driven Motion Picture:
Life of Pi

The 11th Visual Effects Society Awards was held in Beverly Hills, California at the Beverly Hilton Hotel on February 5, 2013, in honor to the best visual effects in film and television of 2012.

== Winners and nominees ==
(winners in bold)

=== Honorary Awards ===
Lifetime Achievement Award:

- **Richard Edlund**

VES Visionary Award:

- **Ang Lee**

=== Film ===
Outstanding Visual Effects in a Visual Effects Driven Feature Motion Picture	Outstanding Supporting Visual Effects in a Feature Motion Picture
**Life of Pi** – Donald R. Elliott, Susan MacLeod, Guillaume Rocheron, Bill Westenhofer: The Avengers – Susan Pickett, Janek Sirrs, Jeff White, Guy Williams; Battleship – Grady Cofer, Pablo Helman, Kevin Elam, Glen McIntosh; The Hobbit: An Unexpected Journey – Joe Letteri, Eileen Moran, Eric Saindon, Kevin L. Sherwood; Prometheus – Paul Butterworth, Charley Henley, Allen Maris, Richard Stammers	**The Impossible** – Felix Bergés, Sandra Hermida, Pau Costa Moeller: Argo – Matt Dessero, Gregory McMurry, Tom Smith, Michele Vallillo; Flight – Kevin Ballie, Michael Lantieri, Chris Stoski, Ryan Tudhope; Rust and Bone – Béatrice Bauwens, Cédric Fayolle, Nicolas Rey, Stéphane Thibert; Zero Dark Thirty – Geoff Anderson, Chris Harvey, Jeremy Hattingh, Richard Stutsman
Outstanding Animation in an Animated Motion Picture	Outstanding Animated Character in a Live Action Feature Motion Picture
**Brave** – Mark Andrews, Steve May, Katherine Sarafian, Bill Wise: Hotel Transylvania – Lydia Bottegoni, James Crossley, Mike Ford, Daniel Kramer; ParaNorman – Chris Butler, Sam Fell, Travis Knight, Brad Schiff; Rise of the Guardians – Nancy Bernstein, David Prescott, Peter Ramsey, Christina Steinberg; Wreck-It Ralph – Sean Jenkins, Scott Kersavage, Rich Moore, Clark Spencer	**Life of Pi – Richard Parker** – Erik De Boer, Sean Comer, Betsy Asher Hall, Kai-Hua Lan: The Avengers – The Hulk – Marc Chu, John Doublestein, Cyrus Jam, Jason Smith; The Hobbit: An Unexpected Journey – Goblin King – Jung Min Chang, James Jacobs, David Clayton, Guillaume Francois; The Hobbit: An Unexpected Journey – Gollum – Gino Acevedo, Alessandro Bonora, Jeff Capogreco, Kevin Estey
Outstanding Animated Character in an Animated Feature Motion Picture	Outstanding Created Environment in a Live Action Feature Motion Picture
**Brave – Mérida** – Travis Hathaway, Olivier Soares, Peter Sumanaseni, Brian Tindall: Hotel Transylvania – Dracula – Bill Haller, Tim Pixton, Jorge Vigara; The Pirates – Band of Misfits – Will Becher, Jay Grace, Loyd Price; Wreck-It Ralph – Vanellope – John Kahwaty, Suzan Kim, Michelle Robinson, Tony Smeed	**The Avengers – Midtown Manhattan** – Richard Bluff, Barry Williams, David Meny, Andy Proctor: The Hobbit: An Unexpected Journey – Goblin Caverns – Ryan Arcus, Simon Jung, Alastair Maher, Anthony M. Patti; Life of Pi – Open Ocean – Jason Bayever, Sho Hasegawa, Jimmy Jewell, Walt Jones; Prometheus – LV-233 – Julien Bolbach, Marco Genovesi, Martin Riedel, Marco Rolandi
Outstanding Created Environment in an Animated Feature Motion Picture	Outstanding Virtual Cinematography in a Live Action Feature Motion Picture
**Brave – The Forest** – Tim Best, Steve Pilcher, Inigo Quilez, Andrew Whittock: ParaNorman – Graveyard – Phil Brotherton, Robert Desue, Oliver Jones, Nick Mariana; ParaNorman – Main Street – Alice Bird, Matt DeLeu, Caitlin Pashalek; Rise of the Guardians – The North Pole – Eric Bouffard, Sonja Burchard, Andy Harbeck, Peter Maynez	**The Hobbit: An Unexpected Journey** – Matt Aitken, Victor Huang, Christian Rivers, R. Christopher White: The Amazing Spider-Man – Rob Engle, David Schaub, Cosku Turhan, Max Tyrie; The Avengers – Downtown Manhattan – Colin Benoit, Jeremy Goldman, Tory Mercer, Roger Liu; Total Recall – Hover Car Chase – Daniel Baldwin, Mattias Forsstrom, Sam Schwier, Joshua Wassung
Outstanding Models in a Feature Motion Picture	Outstanding FX and Simulation Animation in a Live Action Feature Motion Picture
**The Avengers – Helicarrier** – Rene Garcia, Bruce Holcomb, Polly Ing, Aaron Wilson: The Dark Knight Rises – Airplane Heist – Scott Beverly, Alan Faucher, Ian Hunter, Steve Newburn; The Impossible – Orchid Hotel – Markus Donhauser, Patrick Lehn, Angel Martinez, Juergen Pirman; Men in Black 3 – Cape Canaveral/Apollo Launch – Craig Feifarek, Hee-Chel Nam, Eric Neill, Taehyun Park	**Life of Pi – Storm of God** – Hary Mukhopadhyay, David Stopford, Mark Williams, Derek Wolfe: Battleship – Florent Andorra, Willi Geiger, Rick Hankins, Florian Witzel; The Hobbit: An Unexpected Journey – Areito Echevarria, Chet Leavai, Garry Runke, Francois Sugny; Life of Pi – Ocean – Jason Bayever, David Horsley, Scott Townsend, Miles Vignol
Outstanding FX and Simulation Animation in an Animated Feature Motion Picture	Outstanding Compositing in a Feature Motion Picture
**Brave** – Chris Chapman, Dave Hale, Michael K. O'Brien, Bill Watral: ParaNorman – Angry Aggie Ink-Blot Electricity – Michael Cordova, Grant Laker, Susanna Luck, Peter Vickery; ParaNorman – Practical Volumetrics – Aidan Fraser, Joe Gorski, Eric Kuehne, Andrew Nawrot; Rise of the Guardians – Last Stand – Andy Hayes, Carl Hooper, Andrew Wheeler, Stephen Wood	**Life of Pi – Storm of God** – Ryan Clarke, Jose Fernandez, Sean Oharas, Hamish Schumacher: The Avengers -Hulk Punch – Chris Balog, Peter Demarest, Nelson Sepulveda, Alan Travis; The Hobbit: An Unexpected Journey – Jean-Luc Azzis, Steven McGillen, Christoph Salzmann, Charles Tait; Prometheus – Engineers & the Orrery – Xavier Bourque, Sam Cole, Simone Riginelli

=== Television ===
Outstanding Visual Effects in a Broadcast Program	Outstanding Supporting Visual Effects in a Broadcast Program
**Game of Thrones – Valar Morghulis** – Rainer Gombos, Steve Kullback, Sven Martin, Juri Stanossek: Curiosity – Nathan Larouche, Lon Molnar, Geoff Scott, Bojan Zoric; Falling Skies – World's Apart – James Hattin, Suzanne MacLennan, Curt Miller, Andrew Orloff; Munsters: Mockingbird Lane – Leslie Ekk, Jonah Hall, Livia Hanich, Jason Zimmerman; Once Upon a Time – The Stranger – Dale Fay, Laura Jones, Nathan Matsuda, Andrew Orloff	**Boardwalk Empire – Episode 308** – John Bair, Parker Chehak, Paul Graff, Lesley Robson-Foster: Hawaii Five-0 – La O Na Makuahine – Gevork Babityan, Jon Howard, Armen Kevorkian, Ricardo Ramirez; Hell on Wheels – Blood Moon – Matt Von Brock, Jason Foster, Tim Jacobsen, Bill Kent; Hemingway & Gellhorn – Nathan Abbot, Kip Larsen, Chris Morley, Christopher Paizis; The Men Who Built America – Episode 2 – Glenn Allen, Matthew Conner, Eran Dinur, David Reynolds
Outstanding Visual Effects in a Commercial	Outstanding Animated Character in a Broadcast Program or Commercial
**Nike -Biomorph** – Rafael Colon, Aladino Debert, David Liu, Nicola Wiseman; Call of Duty – Surprise – Steve Beck, Chris Knight, Robert Sethi, Christina Thompson; Lady Gaga – Fame – Kait Boehm, Juan Gomez, Kurt Lawson, Greg Teegarden; Norfolk Southern – City of Possibilities – Chris Bernier, Kyle Cody, Jeff Lopez, Boo Wong; Pepsi – Crowd Surfing – Martin Aufinger, Russell Dodgson, Abby Orchard, Chris Redding	**Game of Thrones – Training the Dragons** – Irfan Celik, Florian Friedman, Ingo Schachner, Chris Stenner: Hallmark – Motherbird – Vince Baertsoen, Kevin Ives, Laurent Makowski, Joshua Merck; Jimmy Kimmel Live! – Ted – James W. Brown, Brad Fox, Ross Nakamura, Jeffrey Woo; Sinbad – Episode 1 – Andy Guest, James Moxon, James Reid, Greg Spencer
Outstanding Created Environment in a Broadcast Program or Commercial	Outstanding Virtual Cinematography in a Broadcast Program or Commercial
**Game of Thrones – Pyke** – Rene Borst, Thilo Ewers, Adam Figielski, Jonas Stuckenbrock: Call of Duty – Eclipse: Surprise – Chris Bayol, Steve Beck, Gawain Liddiard, Robert Sethi; 5 Gum – RPM: Choose Your Energy – Kaan Atilla, Kevin Gillen, Isaac Irvin, Brandon Lester; Sinbad – James Moxon, Lyndall Spagnoletti, Greg Spencer	**ZombiU** – Dominique Boidin, Léon Bérelle, Rémi Kozyra, Maxime Luère: Call of Duty – Eclipse: Surprise – Chris Bayol, Steve Beck, Chris Knight, Robert Sethi; Halo 4 – Forward Unto Dawn – Steven Chen, Phil Dakin, Paul Stodolny; Toyota – Real Deal – Adam Berg, Niles Heckman, Ronald Herbst, Vernon Wilbert
Outstanding FX and Simulation Animation in a Commercial or Broadcast Program	Outstanding Compositing in a Broadcast Program
**Guinness – Cloud** – Tom Bussell, Neil Davies: Last Resort – Captain – Matt Von Brock, Bruce Coy, Junaid Farooq, Aldo Ruggiero; Nike -Biomorph – Aladino Debert, Eric Ebling, Ken Mitchel Jones; Nissan Altima – Wouldn't it be Cool – Tim Borgmann, Forcada, Aron Hjartarson, Shayne Ryan	**Game of Thrones -Episode 210: White Walker Army** – Falk Boje, Esther Engel, Alexey Kuchinsky, Klaus Wuchta: Hell on Wheels – Blood Moon – Antonio Chang, Jason Fotter, Eric Hayden, Josh Miyaji; Hemingway & Gellhorn – Nathan Abbot, Shelley Campbell, Chris Morley, Christopher Paizis; Last Resort – Captain – Matt Von Brock, Jason Fotter, Aldo Ruggiero, Brian Williams
Outstanding Compositing in a Commercial	
**Chevy −2012 Silverado** – Dominik Bauch, Nicholas Kim, Benjamin Walsh: Call of Duty – Eclipse: Surprise – Chris Knight, Becky Porter, Jake Maymudes, Tayler Smith; Nike -Game on, World – Daniel Marsh, Paul O'Shea; Norfolk Southern – City of Possibilities – Tom Bardwell, Chris Bernier, Kyle Cody, Erin Nash	

=== Other categories ===
Outstanding Real-Time Visuals in a Video Game	Outstanding Visual Effects in a Special Venue Project
**Call of Duty: Black Ops II** – Jason Blundell, Barry Whitney, Colin Whitney: Dirt: Showdown – Peter Asberg, Peter Clark, Nathan Fisher, Julie McGurren; Dishonored – Viktor Antonov, Sebastien Mitton, Jean-Luc Monnet, Julien Roby; Forza Horizon – Michel Bastien, Terrance Newell, Gareth Richards, Andrew Sage; Halo 4 – Mike Cronin, Brien Goodrich, Kenneth Scott	**Despicable Me: Minion Mayhem** – Heather Drummons, Joel Friesch, Brooke Breton, Chris Bailey: The Ball Unleashed – Gianni Aliotti, Lisa Zusmer DelPrete, Marc Dominic Rienzo, Eric Sanford; Earthquake: Evidence of a Restless Planet – Matthew Blackwell, Tom Kennedy, Jeroen Lapré, Mike Schmitt; SeaWorld: Turtle Trek 3D/360 – Timur "Taron" Baysal, Jae Cheol Hong, Cecil Magpuri, Michael Roderick
Outstanding Visual Effects in a Student Project	
**Natalis** – Daniel Brkovic, David Kirchner, Jan–Marcel Kuehn, Tom Festl: Globosome – Sascha Geddert, Johannes Peter, Patrick Schuler, Philipp Wolf; Rollin' Safari – Kyra Buschor, Anna Habermehl, Constantin Päplow, Thomas Hartmann; Voile Noir – Michael Balthazart, Raphaël Gaudin, Clément Granjon De Lepiney, Quentin Sauvinet	
