= Visual Effects Society Award for Outstanding Compositing & Lighting in a Feature =

Annual US film award

The Visual Effects Society Award for Outstanding Compositing in a Photoreal Feature is one of the annual awards given by the Visual Effects Society, starting in 2002. It is awarded to visual effects artists for their work in compositing.

== Winners and nominees ==
=== 2000s ===
Year	Film	Nominee(s)
2002	Best Compositing in a Motion Picture	
2002	The Lord of the Rings: The Two Towers	Mark Lewis, GG Heitmann Demers, Alex Lemke, Alfred Murrle
2002	Harry Potter and the Chamber of Secrets (Quiddich Match)	Barbara Brennan, Jay Cooper, Kimberly Lashbrook, Dorne Huebler
2002	Minority Report	Scott Frankel, Patrick Jarvis
2003	Master and Commander: The Far Side of the World	Philip R. Brennan
2003	The League of Extraordinary Gentlemen	George Macri, Mike Hardison, Patrick Murphy, Dan Trezise
2003	The Lord of the Rings: The Return of the King	Mortitz Glaesle, Mark Lewis, Kara Vandeleur
2004	Spider-Man 2 (Train Sequence)	Colin Drobnis, Greg Derochie, Blaine Kennison, Kenny Lam
2004	Harry Potter and the Prisoner of Azkaban	Dorne Huebler, Jay Cooper, Patrick Brennan, Anthony Shafer
2004	The Phantom of the Opera (Opening Shot)	Claas Henke, Laurent Ben-Minoun, Anupam Das
2005	War of the Worlds	Marshall Krasser, Michael Jamieson, Jeff Saltzman, Regan Mcgee
2005	Harry Potter and the Goblet of Fire (Voldemort's Nose)	Ben Shepherd, Uel Horman, Charley Henley, Nicolas Aithadi
2005	King Kong (T-Rex Fight)	Erik Winquist, Michaell Pangrazio, Steve Cronin, Suzanne Jandu
2006	Outstanding Compositing in a Feature Motion Picture	
2006	Pirates of the Caribbean: Dead Man's Chest	Eddie Pasquarello, Francois Lambert, Jeff Sutherland, Tory Mercer
2006	The Da Vinci Code (Saint Sulpice Sequence)	Mathew Krentz, Jordan Benwick, Enrico Perei, Rafal Kaniewski
2006	Poseidon	Scott Younkin, Janeen Elliott, Brian Connor, Mark Nettleton
2007	Transformers	Pat Tubach, Beth D'Amato, Todd Vaziri, Mike Conte
2007	I Am Legend (Seaport Evacuation)	Darren Lurie, John Sasaki, Rita Kunzler, Fish Essenfeld
2007	Pirates of the Caribbean: At World's End	Eddie Pasquarello, Katrin Klaiber, Jen Howard, Shawn Hiller
2007	Pirates of the Caribbean: At World's End (Death of Beckett)	Lou Pecora, Joel Behrens, Ted Andre, Kevin Ligenfelser
2007	The Water Horse: Legend of the Deep (Crusoe)	Scott Stokdyk, Terry Clotiaux, Peter Nofz, Spencer Cook
2008	The Curious Case of Benjamin Button (Benjamin Comes Together)	Janelle Croshaw, Paul Lambert, Sonja Burchard, Sarahjane Javelo
2008	The Chronicles of Narnia: Prince Caspian	Stuart Lashley, Arundi Asregadoo, Mark Curtis, Richard Baker
2008	Iron Man (Head Under Sisplay/HUD Compositing)	Jonathan Rothbart, Dav Rauch, Kyle McCulloch, Kent Seki
2008	Quantum of Solace (Siennna Chase and Fight Sequence)	Anthony Smith, Christian Kaestner, Adrian Metzelaar, Jon Thum
2009	District 9	Shervin Shogian, Hamish Schumacher, Janeen Elliott, Simon Hughes
2009	Avatar	Erik Winquist, Robin Hollander, Erich Eder, Giuseppe Tagliavini
2009	Avatar (End Battle)	Eddie Pasquarello, Beth D'Amato, Todd Vaziri, Jay Cooper
2009	Sherlock Holmes	Kate Windibank, Jan Adamczyk, Sam Osborne, Alex Cumming

=== 2010s ===
Year	Film	Nominee(s)
2010	Inception	Astrid Busser-Casas, Scott Pritchard, Jan Maroske, George Zwier
2010	Alice in Wonderland (Stolen Tarts)	Aaron Kupferman, Lisa Deaner, Orde Stevanoski, Ruben Flores
2010	Hereafter (Tsunami Sequence)	Joseph Farrell, Nick Crew, Jamie Hallett, Christine Lo
2010	Tron: Legacy	Paul Lambert, Sonja Burchard, Kym Olsen, Sarajane Javelo Chase
2011	Captain America: The First Avenger	Casey Allen, Trent Claus, Brian Hajek, Cliff Welsh
2011	Harry Potter and the Deathly Hallows – Part 2	Michele Benigna, Martin Ciastko, Thomas Dyg, Andy Robinson
2011	Rise of the Planet of the Apes	Jean-Luc Azzis, Quentin Hema, Simon Jung, Christoph Salzmann
2011	Transformers: Dark of the Moon	Chris Balog, Ben O'Brien, Amy Shepard, Jeff Sutherland
2012	Life of Pi (Storm of God)	Ryan Clarke, Jose Fernandez, Sean Oharas, Hamish Schumacher
2012	The Avengers (Hulk Punch)	Chris Balog, Peter Demarest, Nelson Sepulveda, Alan Travis
2012	The Hobbit: An Unexpected Journey	Jean-Luc Azzis, Steven McGillen, Christoph Salzmann, Charles Tait
2012	Prometheus (Engineers & the Orrery)	Xavier Bourque, Sam Cole, Simone Riginelli, Denis Scolan
2013	Gravity	Mark Bakowski, Anthony Smith, Theodor Groeneboom, Adrian Metzelaar
2013	Elysium	Jean Lapointe, Jordan Benwick, Robin Hackl, Janeen Elliott
2013	The Hobbit: The Desolation of Smaug	Charles Tait, Robin Hollander, Giuseppe Tagliavini, Sean Heuston
2013	Iron Man 3 (Barrel of Monkeys)	Michael Maloney, Francis Puthanangadi, Justin Van Der Lek, Howard Cabalfin
2013	Iron Man 3 (House Attack)	Darren Poe, Stefano Trivelli, Josiah Howison, Zach Zaubi
2014	Outstanding Compositing in a Photoreal/Live Action Feature Motion Picture	
2014	Dawn of the Planet of the Apes	Christoph Salzmann, Florian Schroeder, Quentin Hema, Simone Riginelli
2014	Edge of Tomorrow (Beach)	Craig Wentworth, Matthew Welford, Marie Victoria Denoga, Frank Fieser
2014	The Hobbit: The Battle of the Five Armies	Simon Jung, Ben Roberts, Matthew Adams, Jordan Schilling
2014	Interstellar (Water)	Raphael Hamm, Isaac Layish, Sebastian Von Overheidt, Tristan Myles
2015	Outstanding Compositing in a Photoreal Feature	
2015	The Revenant	Donny Rausch, Alan Travix, Charles Lai, TC Harrison
2015	Mad Max: Fury Road	Lindsay Adams, Matthew Wynne, Chris Davies, Phil Outen
2015	San Andreas (Los Angeles Destruction)	Sandro Blattnber, Hamish Schumacher, Nicholas Kim, Mario Rokicki
2015	Star Wars: The Force Awakens	Jay Cooper, Marian Mavrovic, Jean Lapointe, Alex Prichard
2015	Tomorrowland	Francois Lambert, Jean Lapointe, Peter Demarest, Conny Fauser
2016	The Jungle Book	Christoph Salzmann, Masaki Mitchell, Matthew Adams, Max Stummer
2016	Doctor Strange (New York City)	Matthew Lane, Jose Fernandez, Ziad Shureih, Amy Shepard
2016	Independence Day: Resurgence (Under the Mothership)	Mathew Giampa, Adrian Sutherland, Daniel Lee, Ed Wilkie
2016	X-Men: Apocalypse (Quicksilver Rescue)	Jess Burnheim, Alana Newell, Andy Peel, Matthew Shaw
2017	War for the Planet of the Apes	Christoph Salzmann, Robin Hollander, Ben Morgan, Ben Warner
2017	Blade Runner 2049 (LAPD Approach and Joi Holograms)	Tristan Myles, Miles Lauridsen, Joel Delle-Vergin, Farhad Mohasseb
2017	Kong: Skull Island	Nelson Sepulveda, Aaron Brown, Paolo Acri, Shawn Mason
2017	Thor: Ragnarok (Bridge Battle)	Gavin McKenzie, David Simpson, Owen Carroll, Mark Gostlow
2018	Avengers: Infinity War (Titan)	Sabine Laimer, Tim Walker, Tobias Wiesner, Massimo Pasquetti
2018	First Man	Joel Delle-Vergin, Peter Farkas, Miles Lauridsen, Francesco Dell'Anna
2018	Jurassic World: Fallen Kingdom	John Galloway, Enrik Pavdeja, David Nolan, Juan Espigares Enriquez
2018	Welcome to Marwen	Woei Lee, Saul Galbiati, Max Besner, Thai-Son Doan
2019	The Irishman	Nelson Sepulveda, Vince Papaix, Benjamin O'Brien, Christopher Doerhoff
2019	Alita: Battle Angel	Adam Bradley, Carlo Scaduto, Hirofumi Takeda, Ben Roberts
2019	Avengers: Endgame	Tim Walker, Blake Winder, Tobias Wiesner, Joerg Bruemmer
2019	Captain Marvel (Young Nick Fury)	Trent Claus, David Moreno Hernandez, Jeremiah Sweeney, Yuki Uehara
2019	Star Wars: The Rise of Skywalker	Jeff Sutherland, John Galloway, Sam Bassett, Charles Lai

=== 2020s ===
Year	Film	Nominee(s)
2020	Project Power	Russell Horth, Matthew Patience, Julien Rousseau
2020	Greyhound	Chris Gooch, Tiago Santos, Stu Bruzek, Sneha Amin
2020	Mulan	Christoph Salzmann, Beck Veitch, Joerg Bruemmer, Indah Maretha
2020	Underwater	Sreejith Venugopalan, Ruslan Borysov, Susil Sabat, Andreas Andersson
2021	Outstanding Compositing & Lighting in a Feature	
2021	Dune (Attack on Arrakeen)	Gregory Haas, Francesco Dell'Anna, Abhishek Chaturvedi, Cleve Zhu
2021	Black Widow (Red Room Crashing Back to Earth)	Michael Melchiorre, Simon Twine, Daniel Harkness, Tim Crowson
2021	Dune (Hologram & Hunter Seeker)	Patrick Heinen, Jacob Maymudes, Tj Burke, James Jooyoung Lee
2021	Shang-Chi and the Legend of the Ten Rings (Macau City)	Jeremie Maheu, Mathieu Dupuis, Karthic Ramesh, Jiri Kilevnik
2021	Spider-Man: No Way Home (Liberty Island Battle & Christmas Swing Finale)	Zac Campbell, Frida Nerdal, Louis Corr, Kelvin Yee
2022	Avatar: The Way of Water (Water Integration)	Sam Cole, Francois Sugny, Florian Schroeder, Jean Matthews
2022	Avatar: The Way of Water (Landing Rockets Forest Destruction)	Miguel Santana Da Silva, Hongfei Geng, Jonathan Moulin, Maria Corcho
2022	The Batman (Rainy Freeway Chase)	Beck Veitch, Stephen Tong, Eva Snyder, Rachel E. Herbert
2022	Top Gun: Maverick	Saul Davide Galbiati, Jean-Freceric Veilleux, Felix B. Lafontaine, Cynthia Rodriguez del Castillo
2023	The Creator (Bar)	Phil Prates, Min Kim, Nisarg Suthar, Toshiko Miura
2023	The Creator (Spaceships)	Ben O-Brien, Juan Espigares Enriquez, Wesley Roberts, Hayes Brien
2023	Guardians of the Galaxy Vol. 3	Indah Maretha, Beck Veitch, Nathan Abbot, Steve McGillen
2023	John Wick: Chapter 4 (Apartment Massacre Videogame Style)	Javier Roca, Julien Forest, Thomas Bourdis, Dominik Kirouac
2023	Spider-Man: Across the Spider-Verse	Bret St.Clair, Kieron Cheuk-Chi, Lo Kelly, Christophers Rowan Young

== Superlatives ==
=== Films with Multiple Nominations ===
2 Nominations

- Avatar
- Avatar: The Way of Water
- Dune
- Iron Man 3
- Pirates of the Caribbean: At World's End
- The Creator
