= 6th Visual Effects Society Awards =

US film and TV awards ceremony in 2008

6th Visual Effects Society Awards

February 10, 2008

Best Visual Effects in a Visual Effects Driven Motion Picture:
Transformers

The 6th Visual Effects Society Awards, given on 10 February 2008 at the Kodak Grand Ballroom, honored the best visual effects in film and television in 2007. An edited version of the awards was later broadcast on HDNet on April 2, 2008.

== Winners and nominees ==
(Winners in bold)

=== Honorary Awards ===
Lifetime Achievement Award:

- **Steven Spielberg**

=== Film ===
Outstanding Visual Effects in a Visual Effects-Driven Feature Motion Picture	Outstanding Supporting Visual Effects in a Feature Motion Picture
**Transformers** – Scott Farrar, Shari Hanson, Russell Earl, Scott Benza: The Golden Compass – Michael Fink, Susan MacLeod, Bill Westenhofer, Ben Morris; I Am Legend – Janek Sirrs, Mike Chambers, Jim Berney, Crys Forsyth-Smith; Pirates of the Caribbean: At World's End – John Knoll, Jill Brooks, Hal Hickel, Charlie Gibson; Spider-Man 3 – Scott Stokdyk, Terry Clotiaux, Peter Nofz, Spencer Cook	**Ratatouille** – Michael Fong, Apurva Shah, Christine Waggoner, Michael Fu: Blades of Glory – Mark Breakspear, Randy Starr, Shauna Bryan, Kody Sabourin; The Kite Runner – David Ebner, Les Jones, Todd Perry, Leif Einarsson; We Own the Night – Kelly Port, Julian Levi, Brad Parker, Oliver Sarda; Zodiac – Eric Barba, Craig Barron, Janelle Croshaw, Chris Evans
Best Single Visual Effect of the Year	Outstanding Performance by an Animated Character in a Live Action Motion Picture
**Transformers** - Desert Highway Sequence – Scott Farrar, Shari Hanson, Shawn Kelly, Michael Jamieson: 300 - Crazy Horse Sequence – Chris Watts, Gayle Busby, Kristy Millar; Pirates of the Caribbean: At World's End - Jack and Davey Duel – John Knoll, Jill Brooks, Francois Lambert, Philippe Rebours; Spider-Man 3 - The Birth of Sandman – Scott Stokdyk, Terry Clotiaux, Spencer Cook, Doug Bloom; Surf's Up - Riding the Visual Effects Tube – Rob Bredow, Lydia Bottegoni, Daniel Kramer, Matt Hausman	**Pirates of the Caribbean: At World's End - Davey Jones** – Hal Hickel, Marc Chu, Jakub Pistecky, Maia Kayser: Enchanted - Pip – Tom Gibbons, James W. Brown, David Richard Nelson, John Koester; I Am Legend – David Schaub, Marco Marenghi, Josh Beveridge; Spider-Man 3 - Sandman – Chris Yang, Bernd Anger, Dominick Cecere, Remington Scott; Transformers - Optimus Prime – Rick O'Connor, Doug Sutton, Keiji Yamaguchi, Jeff White; The Water Horse: Legend of the Deep - Crusoe – Richard Francis-Moore, Martin Hill, Marco Revelant, Daniel Barrett
Outstanding Performance by an Animated Character in an Animated Motion Picture	Outstanding Effects in an Animated Motion Picture
**Ratatouille - Colette** – Janeane Garofalo, Jaime Landes, Sonoko Konishi, Paul Aichele: Beowulf - Beowulf – Keith Smith, Scott Holmes, Pericles Michielin, Kenn McDonald; Shrek the Third - King Harold – John Cleese, Guillaume Aretos, Tim Cheung, Sean Mahoney; Surf's Up - Chicken Joe – David Schaub, Moon Jun Kang, Brian Casper, Andreas Procopiou; Surf's Up - Cody – David Schaub, Pete Nash, James Crossley, Shia LaBeouf	**Ratatouille - Food** – Jon Reisch, Jason Johnston, Eric Froemling, Tolga Goktekin: Beowulf - Dragon Chase – Theo Vandernoot, Vincent Serritella, Rob Engle, Pericles Michielin; Ratatouille - Rapids – Darwyn Peachey, Chen Shen, Eric Froemling, Tokga Goketkin; Shrek the Third - Effects – Matt Baer, Greg Hart, Krzysztof Rost; Surf's Up - Riding Waves - CG Style – Rob Bredow, Daniel Kramer, Matt Hausman, Danny Dimian
Outstanding Created Environment in a Live Action Feature Motion Picture	Outstanding Models and Miniatures in a Feature Motion Picture
**Pirates of the Caribbean: At World's End - The Maelstrom** – Frank Losasso Petterson, Paul Sharpe, Joakim Arnesson, David Meny: Harry Potter and the Order of the Phoenix - The Hall of Prophecy – David Vickery, Philippe LePrince, Trina Roy, Jolene McCaffrey; I Am Legend - Times Square Hunt – Daniel Eaton, Blaine Kennison, Ron Glass, Daveed Schwartz; Rush Hour 3 – Barry Williams, Robert Weaver, Jay Cooper, Masahiko Tani; Sweeney Todd - The Old Bailey – Raf Morant, Julian Glass, Nakia McGlynn, Christine Wong; Zodiac - Washington and Cherry – Wei Zheng, Greg Szafranski, Janelle Croshaw, Karl Denham	**Transformers** – Dave Fogler, Ron Woodall, Alex Jaeger, Brain Gernand: Harry Potter and the Order of the Phoenix - Hogwarts School – Jose Granell, Nigel Stone; Live Free or Die Hard - Freeway Sequence - F35 Miniature and Effects – Ian Hunter, Scott Schneider, Scott Beverly, John Cazin; Pirates of the Caribbean: At World's End - Practical and Digital Ships – Ken Bailey, Bruce Holcomb, Carl Miller, Geoff Heron; Spider-Man 3 - Building/Crane Destruction Miniature and Effects – Masahiko Tani, Scott Beverly, Forest Fischer, Raymond Moore
Outstanding Compositing in a Feature Motion Picture	Outstanding Special Effects in a Feature Motion Picture
**Transformers** – Pat Tubach, Beth D'Amato, Todd Vaziri, Mike Conte: I Am Legend - Seaport Evacuation – Darren Lurie, John Sasaki, Rita Kunzler, Fish Essenfeld; Pirates of the Caribbean: At World's End – Eddie Pasquarello, Katrin Klaiber, Jen Howard, Shawn Hiller; Pirates of the Caribbean: At World's End - Death of Beckett – Lou Pecora, Joel Behrens, Ted Andre, Kevin Ligenfelser; The Water Horse: Legend of the Deep - Crusoe – Areito Echevarria, Gareth Dinneen, Norman Cates, Caterina Schiffers	**Harry Potter and the Order of the Phoenix** – John Richardson, Stephen Hamilton, Richard Farris, Stephen Hutchinson

=== Television ===
Outstanding Visual Effects in a Broadcast Series	Outstanding Supporting Visual Effects in a Broadcast Program
**Fight For Life - Episode 4** – Philip Dobree, Nicola Instone, Marco Iozzi, Matt Chandler: Battlestar Galactica - Episode 316 - Maelstrom – Mike Gibson, Gary Hutzel, Michael J. Davidson, Kyle Toucher; Doctor Who - Last of the Time Lords - Series 3 - Episode 13 – David Houghton, Will Cohen, Jean-Claude Deguara, Nicolas Hernandez; Heroes - Episode 208: Four Months Ago – Eric Grenaudier, Mark Spatny, Diego Saltieri, Mike Enriquez; Stargate Atlantis - Adrift – Mark Savela, Shannon Gurney, Erica Henderson, Jamie Yukio Kawano	**Rome 2 - Episode 6 - Philipi** – James Madigan, Barrie Hemsley, Duncan Kinnard, Gary Broznich; Drive - Episode 101 - The Starting Line - Driving Sequence – Raoul Yorke Bologini, Loni Peristere, Steve Meter, Chris Jones; Grey's Anatomy - Walk on Water - Ferryboat Crash – Sam Nicholson, Scott Ramsey, Valeri Pfahning, Mike Enriquez; Marie Antoinette - Miniseries – Richard Martin, Pierre Raymond, Sebastien Rioux, Nadine Homier; Pushing Daisies - Pilot Episode – Craig Weiss, Toni Pace Carstensen, Brian Vogt, Jimmy Berndt
Outstanding Visual Effects in a Broadcast Miniseries, Movie or Special	Outstanding Visual Effects in a Commercial
**Battlestar Galactica: Razor** – Mike Gibson, Gary Hutzel, Sean Jackson, Pierre Drolet: Ben 10: Race Against Time - VFX Compilation – Dina Benadon, Evan Jacobs, Brent Young, Chris Christman; Doctor Who Christmas Special 2007 - Voyage of the Damned – David Houghton, Will Cohen, Nicolas Hernandez, Sara Bennett; Race to Mars: Getting to Mars – Manon Barriault, Jacques Levesque, Olivier Goulet, Benoit Girard; Tin Man - Night One – Lee Wilson, Lisa Sepp-Wilson, Sebastien Bergeron	**Smirnoff - Sea** - Bacardi Sun – William Bartlett, Scott Griffin, Dan Seddon, David Mellor: Bacardi - Bacardi Sun – Vittorio Giannini, Franck Lambertz, Robin Carlisle, Nico Cotta; BMW - Hydrogen – Simon Maddison, Dave Kelly, Mike Bain, Sam Cole; BMW - Road – Chris Fieldhouse, Jay Barton, Ron Herbst, Dave Stern; Zune - Ballad of Tina Pink – Luisa Murray, Laurent Ledru, Katrina Salicrup, Miles Essmiller
Outstanding Performance by an Animated Character in a Live Action Broadcast Program, Commercial, or Music Video	Outstanding Created Environment in a Live Action Broadcast Program, Commercial or Music Video
**The Chemical Brothers - Salmon Dance - Fatlip Shots** – Nicklas Andersson, Mike Mellor, Sylvain Marc, Florent DeLa Taille: AMP - Paper – Fred Raimondi, Chris De Santis, Angie Jones, Narbeth Mardirossian; Ben 10: Race Against Time - Grey Matter Sequence – Brent Young, Michael Smith; Doctor Who - Last of the Time Lords - Series 3 - Episode 13 – Nicolas Hernandez, Adam Burnett, Neil Roche, Jean-Claude Deguara; Primeval - Episode 6 - Predator Animation – Mathieu Vig, Antoine Birot, Simon Thistlethwaite, Kevin O'Sullivan; Propel - Stress Monster – Mitch Drain, Sean Faden, Matthew Hackett, Denis Gauthier	**Bury My Heart at Wounded Knee - 002_5** – Phi Tran, Matthew Lee, Martin Hike, Andrew Roberts: Smallville - Metropolis City - Kaz Yoshida, Jack Matsumoto, Andrea Shear, Eli Jarra; Subaru - Peel Out – Graham Fyffe, Chris Nichols, Chris Bankoff, Daniel Buck; Tin Man - Night One – Les Quinn, Ken Lee, Andrew Domachowski, Jonah West; Ugly Betty - A League of Their Own – Chris Martin, Michael Cook, Cedric Tomacruz
Outstanding Matte Paintings in a Broadcast Program, Commercial, or Music Video	Outstanding Compositing in a Broadcast Program, Commercial or Music Video
**Halo 3 - Believe Campaign** – Matthew Gratzner, Alan Scott, Seth Curlin, Greg Boettcher	**Nike - Leave Nothing** – James Allen, Rob Trent: Levis - Change – Tim Davies, Jason Schugardt, Yuichiro Yamashito; Smallville - Bizarro Flood – David Alexander, Kaz Yoshida, Geeta Basantani, Tony White; Smallville - Season 6, Episode 11: Justice – Rob Reinhart, Jake Matsumoto, Takashi Takeoka, Christina Spring; Tin Man - Night One – Todd Thibault, Philippe Thibault, Lionel Lim, Annabelle Kent

=== Other categories ===
Outstanding Real Time Visuals in a Video Game	Outstanding Pre-Rendered Visuals in a Video Game
**Halo 3 - Halo 3 Footage** – Marcus Lehto, Jonty Barnes, Stephen Scott, CJ Cowan: Crysis - Realtime Visuals – Michael Endres, Michael Khaimzon; Mass Effect - Game Sequence – Derek Watts, Casey Hudson; Need for Speed: ProStreet - Pro Street – Michael Mann, Wilson Tang, Eduardo Agostini, Carl Jarrett; Team Fortress 2 – Jason Mitchell, Moby Franke, Chris Green, Dhabih Eng	**World of Warcraft: The Burning Crusade - Cinematic Intro** – Jeff Chamberlain, Scott Abeyta: Command & Conquer 3: Tiberium Wars - GDI, NOD and Scrin Scenes – Richard Taylor, Matt Britton, Ben Hopkins, Tang Katai; Hellgate: London – Tim Miller, Jerome Denjean, Al Shier; The Witcher Cinematic - Intro – Tomek Baginski, Marcin Kobleycki, Grzegorz Kukus, Maciek Jackiewicz
Outstanding Visual Effects in a Special Venue Project	
**Sea Monsters** – Sean Phillips, Jack Geist, Robin Aristorenas, Mark Dubeau: Dinosaurs: Giants of Patagonia - 38_011 – Mario Couturier, Vincent Roberge, Richard Bergeron, Martin L 'Heureux; Monsters, Inc. Laugh Floor - Show Edit – Roger Gould, Liz Gazzano, Joe Garlington, Dan Colajacomo	
