= Villiers School =

Private secondary school in Limerick, Ireland

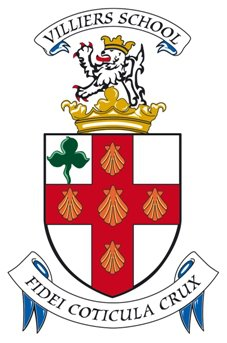

Location
- North Circular Road, Limerick; Ireland; 52.6617°N 8.6563°W

Information
- Type: Private; Day and Boarding school
- Motto: Latin: Fidei Coticula Crux ("The cross is the touchstone of faith")
- Established: 1821; 205 years ago
- Headmistress: Jill Storey
- Enrollment: approx. 520 (2026)
- Website: www.villiers-school.com

Villiers School is a private coeducational Protestant day and boarding secondary school located on the North Circular Road, Limerick, Ireland. The school offers both Leaving Certificate and International Baccalaureate programmes.

== History ==
Founded from the estate of Hannah Villiers in 1821, the school has a Protestant ethos and is managed by the headmistress on behalf of the board of governors. The school relocated from Henry Street to its current location on the Tivoli campus on the North Circular Road less than one mile from Limerick city centre in 1953. As of 2026, the school had approximately 520 students enrolled.

== Notable alumni ==
- Max Dennison, special effects artist
- Dan Ketchum, American swimmer who won a gold medal at the 2004 Athens Olympics
- Aisling O'Loughlin, TV3 presenter
- Jan O'Sullivan, politician and former Minister for Education and Skills
- Samuel Walsh, artist and member of Aosdána
