= Visual Effects Society Award for Outstanding Model in a Photoreal or Animated Project =

Annual US visual effects award

The Visual Effects Society Award for Outstanding Model in a Photoreal or Animated Project is one of the annual awards given by the Visual Effects Society. The award goes to artists whose work in models, miniatures, have been deemed worthy of recognition. Originally, the award was given separately to artists in both film and television, with the categories "Best Models and Miniatures in a Motion Picture" and "Best Models and Miniatures in a Televised Program, Music Video or Commercial". In 2004, there was only one category, recognizing only work in motion pictures with "Outstanding Models and Miniatures in a Motion Picture". In 2005, television was honored, once again, with "Outstanding Models and Miniatures in a Broadcast Program, Commercial or Music Video". Television series and/or televised content (commercials, specials, etc.) would be honored, intermittently, until 2015, when the category was redesigned to honor any motion media project. It has continued to do so since then.

== Winners and nominees ==
=== 2000s ===
Best Models and Miniatures in a Motion Picture

| Year | Film | Model | Nominee(s) |
|---|---|---|---|
| 2002 | The Lord of the Rings: The Two Towers | | Richard Taylor, Paul Van Ommen, Matt Aitken |
| 2002 | Die Another Day | | John Richardson |
| 2002 | Star Wars: Episode II – Attack of the Clones | | Brian Gernand, Russell Paul, Geoff Campbell, Jean Bolte |
| 2003 | The Lord of the Rings: The Return of the King | | Richard Taylor, Paul Van Ommen, Eric Saindon |
| 2003 | Pirates of the Caribbean: The Curse of the Black Pearl | Captain Barbosa | Geoff Campbell, James Tooley, Steve Walton, Dugan Beach |
| 2003 | Pirates of the Caribbean: The Curse of the Black Pearl | The Interceptor | Charlie Bailey, Peter Bailey, Robert Edwards, Don Bies |
| 2004 | The Aviator | XF11 crash | Matthew Gratzner, Scott Schneider, Adam Gelbart, Leigh-Alexandra Jacob |
| 2004 | Harry Potter and the Prisoner of Azkaban | | Jose Granell, Nigel Stone |
| 2004 | National Treasure | Treasure Room | Matthew Gratzner, Forest P. Fischer, Scott Beverly, Leigh-Alexandra Jacob |
| 2005 | War of the Worlds | | Ed Hirsh, Steve Gawley, Joshua Ong, Russell Paul |
| 2005 | Harry Potter and the Goblet of Fire | Hogwarts | Jose Granell, Nigel Stone |
| 2005 | Star Wars: Episode III – Revenge of the Sith | | Brian Gernand, Pamela Choy, Ron Woodall, Kevin Reuter |

Outstanding Models and Miniatures in a Feature Motion Picture

| Year | Film | Model(s) | Nominee(s) |
|---|---|---|---|
| 2006 | Pirates of the Caribbean: Dead Man's Chest | | Bruce Holcomb, Ron Woodall, Charlie Bailey, Carl Miller |
| 2006 | The Good Shepherd | | Matthew Gratzner, Forest Fischer, Enrico Altmann, Leigh-Alexandra Jacob |
| 2006 | V for Vendetta | | Jose Granell, Nigel Stone |
| 2007 | Transformers | | Dave Fogler, Ron Woodall, Alex Jaeger, Brain Gernand |
| 2007 | Harry Potter and the Order of the Phoenix | Hogwarts | Jose Granell, Nigel Stone |
| 2007 | Live Free or Die Hard | Freeway Sequence (F35 Miniature and Effects) | Ian Hunter, Scott Schneider, Scott Beverly, John Cazin |
| 2007 | Pirates of the Caribbean: At World's End | Practical and Digital Ships | Ken Bailey, Bruce Holcomb, Carl Miller, Geoff Heron |
| 2007 | Spider-Man 3 | Building/Crane Destruction Miniature and Effects | Masahiko Tani, Scott Beverly, Forest Fischer, Raymond Moore |
| 2008 | The Dark Knight | Garbage Truck Crash Models & Miniatures | Ian Hunter, Forest Fischer, Scott Beverly, Adam Gelbart |
| 2008 | Indiana Jones and the Kingdom of the Crystal Skull | | David Fogler, Craig Hammack, Brian Gernand, Geoff Heron |
| 2008 | Iron Man | Suit-Up Machine | Aaron McBride, Russell Paul, Gerald Gutschmidt, Kenji Yamaguchi |
| 2008 | My Darling of the Mountains | Hot Springs | Taro Kiba, Kenji Nagatani, Yuki Minagawa, Hideo Udo |
| 2009 | Avatar | Samson/Home Tree/Floating Mountains/Ampsuit | Simon Cheung, Paul Jenness, John Stevenson-Galvin, Rainer Zoetti |
| 2009 | Coraline | | Deborah Cook, Paul Mack, Martin Meunier, Matthew DeLue |
| 2009 | Night at the Museum: Battle of the Smithsonian | National Air and Space Museum Escape | Ian Hunter, Forest Fischer, Robert Chapin, Tony Chen |
| 2009 | Terminator Salvation | Practical Models and Miniatures | Brian Gernand, Geoff Heron, Nick d'Abo, Patrick Sweeney |

Best Models and Miniatures in a Televised Program, Music Video, or Commercial

| Year | Program | Model | Nominee(s) |
|---|---|---|---|
| 2002 | Star Trek: Enterprise: "Dead Stop" | | John Teska, Koji Kuramura, Pierre Drolet, Sean M. Scott |
| 2002 | Gatorade: "Visitors" | | Matthew Gratzner, James Waterhouse, Scott Lukowski, Eric Coon |
| 2002 | Rose Red | | Michael Joyce |
| 2003 | Helen of Troy | | Anthony Ocampo |
| 2003 | Battlestar Galactica | | Lee Stringer, Jose Perez, Gabriel Köerner, Michael Enriquez |

Outstanding Models and Miniatures in a Broadcast Program, Commercial, or Music Video

| Year | Program | Model | Nominee(s) |
|---|---|---|---|
| 2005 | Las Vegas: "Bold, Beautiful and Blue" | | Michael Cook, Anthony Ocampo, Eugene Kim, Renaud Talon |
| 2005 | Ford: World Traveler | | Matthew Gratzner, Greg M. Boettcher, Enrico Altmann, Matt Burlingame |
| 2005 | Walgreens: Giving Tree/Last Minute | Winter Wonderland | Ian Hunter, Forest P. Fischer, Seth Curlin, Joachim Duppel |
| 2006 | Battlestar Galactica: "Resurrection Ship, Part II" | | Steve Graves, Jose Peretz, Mark Shimer, Chris Zapara |
| 2006 | Commander in Chief: "Air Force One" | | Michael Enriquez |
| 2006 | Dodge: Fairy | | Matthew Gratzner, Forest P. Fischer, Jon Warren, Scott Schneider |
| 2007 | Halo 3: Believe Campaign | | Matthew Gratzner, Alan Scott, Seth Curlin, Greg M. Boettcher |

Outstanding Models and Miniatures in a Broadcast Program or Commercial

| Year | Program | Model | Nominee(s) |
|---|---|---|---|
| 2008 | New Balance: Anthem | Garbage Truck Crash Models & Miniatures | Ian Hunter, Jon Warren, Matt Burlingame, Raymond Moore |
| 2008 | Ghost Whisperer: "Save Our Souls" | Claridon Ship | Eric Hance |

=== 2010s ===
Outstanding Models and Miniatures in a Feature Motion Picture

| Year | Film | Model(s) | Nominee(s) |
|---|---|---|---|
| 2010 | Inception | Hospital Fortress Destruction | Ian Hunter, Scott Beverly, Forest P. Fischer, Robert Spurlock |
| 2010 | The Expendables | The Palace Explodes | Gene Warren Jr., Christopher Warren, Gene Warren III |
| 2010 | Iron Man 2 | Hammer Military Drones | Bruce Holcomb, Ron Woodall, John Goodson, John Walker |
| 2010 | Shutter Island | Ward-C Int/Ext, Lighthouse Int/Ext | Matthew Gratzner, Scott Schneider, Adam Gelbart, Richard Ewan |
| 2011 | Transformers: Dark of the Moon | Driller | Timothy Brakensiek, Kelvin Chu, Dave Fogler, Rene Garcia |
| 2011 | Harry Potter and the Deathly Hallows – Part 2 | Hogwarts Buildings | Steven Godfrey, Pietro Ponti, Tania Richard, Andy Warren |
| 2011 | Hugo | Train Crash | Scott Beverly, Alan K.M. Faucher, Forest P. Fischer, Matthew Gratzner |
| 2011 | Mission: Impossible – Ghost Protocol | Parking Garage | John Goodson, Russell Paul, Victor Schutz, Kristian Pedlow |
| 2012 | The Avengers | Helicarrier | Rene Garcia, Bruce Holcomb, Polly Ing, Aaron Wilson |
| 2012 | The Dark Knight Rises | Airplane Heist | Ian Hunter, Scott Beverly, Alan K.M. Faucher, Steve Newburn |
| 2012 | The Impossible | Orchid Hotel | Markus Donhauser, Patrick Lehn, Angel Pedro Martinez, Jurgen Pirman |
| 2012 | Men in Black 3 | Cape Canaveral/Apollo Launch | Craig Feifarek, Hee-Chel Nam, Eric Neill, Taehyun Park |
| 2013 | Gravity | ISS Exterior | Ben Lambert, Paul Beilby, Chris Lawrence, Andy Nicholson |
| 2013 | The Lone Ranger | Colby Locomotive | Rene Garcia, Steve Walton, Brian Paik, Gerald Gutschmidt |
| 2013 | Pacific Rim | | Dave Fogler, Alex Jaeger, Aaron Wilson, David Richard Nelson |
| 2013 | Star Trek Into Darkness | | Bruce Holcomb, Ron Woodall, John Goodson, Tom Fejes |

Outstanding Models and Miniatures in a Broadcast Program or Commercial

| Year | Program | Model(s) | Nominee(s) |
|---|---|---|---|
| 2010 | Boardwalk Empire: "The Ivory Tower" | | J. John Corbett, Matthew Conner, Brendan Fitzgerald |
| 2010 | Family Guy: "Brian Griffin's House of Payne | | Andrew Karr, Alec McClymont, Daniel Osaki, Paul Hegg |
| 2011 | Boardwalk Empire: "Georgia Peaches" | | Matthew Conner, Eran Dinur, David W. Reynolds, Szymon Weglarski |
| 2011 | Arrowhead: Nature's Fix | | Carl Horner, Ian Hunter, Miyo Nakamura, Hayley O'Neill |
| 2011 | Falling Skies | Airbase | Jon Chesson, Steve Graves, Michael Kirylo, Renaud Talon |
| 2011 | Once Upon a Time | Snow's Castle | Jason O. Monroe, Chris Strauss, Michael Kirylo, Jeremy Melton |

Outstanding Models in Any Motion Media Project

| Year | Film | Model(s) | Nominee(s) |
|---|---|---|---|
| 2014 | Big Hero 6 | San Fransokyo | Brett Achorn, Minh Duong, Scott Watanabe, Larry Wu |
| 2014 | The Boxtrolls | Mecha-Drill | Tom McClure, Oliver Jones, Raul Martinez |
| 2014 | The Hobbit: The Battle of the Five Armies | Laketown | Leslie Chan, Alastair Maher, Niklas Preston, Justin Stockton |
| 2014 | Transformers: Age of Extinction | Knightship | Landis R. Fields IV, John Goodson, Anthony Rispoli, Dae-Ho Han |

Outstanding Models in a Photoreal or Animated Project

| Year | Film | Model(s) | Nominee(s) |
|---|---|---|---|
| 2015 | Star Wars: The Force Awakens | BB-8 | Joshua Lee, Matthew Denton, Landis R. Fields IV, Cyrus Jam |
| 2015 | Avengers: Age of Ultron | Hulkbuster | Harold Weed, Robert Marinic, Daniel Gonzalez, Myriam Catrin |
| 2015 | Everest | Mount Everest | Matthias Bjarnason, Olafur Haraldsson, Kjartan Hardarson, Pétur Arnórsson |
| 2015 | Jurassic World | Indominus Rex | Jubinville Steve, Martin Murphy, Aaron Grey, Kevin Reuter |

Outstanding Model in a Photoreal or Animated Project

| Year | Film | Model | Nominee(s) |
|---|---|---|---|
| 2016 | Deepwater Horizon | Deepwater Horizon Rig | Kelvin Lau, Jean Bolte, Kevin Sprout, Kim Vongbunyong |
| 2016 | Rogue One: A Star Wars Story | Princess Leia | Paul Giacoppo, Gareth J. Jensen, Todd Vaziri, James Tooley |
| 2016 | Rogue One: A Star Wars Story | Star Destroyer | Jay Machado, Chulev Marko, Akira Orikasa, Steven Knipping |
| 2016 | Star Trek Beyond | Enterprise | Dan Nicholson, Rhys Salcombe, Chris Elmer, Andreas Maaninka |
| 2017 | Blade Runner 2049 | LAPD Headquarters | Alex Funke, Steven Saunders, Joaquin Loyzaga, Chris Menges |
| 2017 | Despicable Me 3 | Dru's Car | Eric Guillon, François-Xavier Lepeintre, Guillaume Boudeville, Pierre Lopes |
| 2017 | Life | The ISS | Tom Edwards, Kshirsagar Chaitanya, Satish Kutan, Paresh Dodia |
| 2017 | United States Marine Corps | Monument | U.S. Marines: Anthem |
| 2018 | Mortal Engines | London | Matthew Sandoval, James Ogle, Nick Keller, Samuel Tack |
| 2018 | Avengers: Infinity War | Nidavellir Forge Megastructure | Chad Roen, Ryan J. Rogers, Jeff Tetzlaff, Ming Pan |
| 2018 | Incredibles 2 | Underminer Vehicle | Neil Blevins, Philip Metschan, Kexx Singleton |
| 2018 | Ready Player One | DeLorean DMC-12 | Giuseppe Bufalo, Kim Lindqvist, Mauro Giacomazzo, William Gallyot |
| 2018 | Solo: A Star Wars Story | Millennium Falcon | Masa Narita, Steve Walton, David Meny, James Clyne |
| 2019 | The Mandalorian: "Chapter 3: The Sin" | The Razorcrest | Doug Chiang, Jay Machado, John Goodson, Landis R. Fields IV |
| 2019 | Lost in Space | The Resolute | Xuan Prada, Jason Martin, Jonathan Vårdstedt, Eric Andersson |
| 2019 | The Man in the High Castle | Rocket Train | Neil Taylor, Casi Blume, Ben McDougal, Chris Kuhn |
| 2019 | Missing Link | The Manchuria | Todd Harvey, Daniel R. Casey, Katy Hughes |

=== 2020s ===
| Year | Film | Model(s) | Nominee(s) |
|---|---|---|---|
| 2020 | The Midnight Sky | Aether | Michael Balthazart, Jonathan Opgenhaffen, John-Peter Li, Simon Aluze |
| 2020 | The Mandalorian | Boba Fett's Ship | Jay Machado, Enrico Damm, Gerald Blaise, Ryan Church |
| 2020 | The Mandalorian: "Chapter 16: The Rescue" | Light Cruiser | John Knoll, John Goodson, Dan Patrascu, Rene Garcia |
| 2020 | The Witches | Rollercoaster | Jared Michael, Peter Dominik, Sylvain Lesaint, Emily Tilson |
| 2021 | Dune | Royal Ornithopter | Marc Austin, Anna Yamazoe, Michael Chang, Rachael Dunk |
| 2021 | Black Widow | The Red Room | Tristan John Connors, Bo Kwon, James Stuart, Ryan Duhaime |
| 2021 | Encanto | Casita Madrigal | Jonathan Lin, Chris Patrick O'Connell, Christoffer Pedersen, Alberto Abril |
| 2021 | The Suicide Squad | Jotunheim | Simon Dean Morley, Cedric Enriquez Canlas, Layne Howe, Alberto R. S. Hernandez |
| 2022 | Avatar: The Way of Water | The Sea Dragon | Sam Sharplin, Stephen Skorepa, Ian Baker, Guillaume Francois |
| 2022 | The Sea Beast | | Maxx Okazaki, Susan Kornfeld, Edward Lee, Doug Smith |
| 2022 | Top Gun: Maverick | F-14 Tomcat | Christian Peck, Klaudio Ladavac, Aram Jung, Peter Dominik |
| 2022 | Wendell & Wild | Dream Faire | Peter Dahmen, Paul Harrod, Nicholas Blake |
| 2023 | The Creator | Nomad | Oliver Kane, Mat Monro, Florence Green, Serban Ungureanu |
| 2023 | Guardians of the Galaxy Vol. 3 | The Arête | Kenneth Johansson, Jason Galeon, Tim Civil, Artur Vill |
| 2023 | Peter Pan & Wendy | Jolly Roger | Patrick Comtois, Thomas Gallardo, Harrison Stark, David Thibodeau |
| 2023 | Spider-Man: Across the Spider-Verse | Spider HQ | Dongick David Sheen, Mark JeongWoong, Lee Mikaela Bantog, René Völker |

== Superlatives ==
=== Films with Multiple Nominations ===
2 Nominations

- Pirates of the Caribbean: The Curse of the Black Pearl
- Rogue One: A Star Wars Story

=== Programs with Multiple Nominations ===
3 Nominations

- The Mandalorian

2 Nominations

- Battlestar Galactica
- Boardwalk Empire
