= 15th Visual Effects Society Awards =

US film and TV awards ceremony in 2017

- Date: February 7, 2017

Highlights
- Best Visual Effects in a Visual Effects Driven Motion Picture: The Jungle Book

The 15th Visual Effects Society Awards was held in Los Angeles on February 7, 2017, in honor to the best visual effects in film and television of 2016. The nominations were announced on January 10, 2017. The Jungle Book took five awards at the ceremony.

== Winners and nominees ==
(winners in bold)

=== Honorary awards ===
Lifetime Achievement Award:

- **Ken Ralston**

VES Visionary Award

- **Victoria Alonso**

=== Film ===
Outstanding Visual Effects in a Photoreal Feature	Outstanding Supporting Visual Effects in a Photoreal Feature
**The Jungle Book** – Robert Legato, Joyce Cox, Andrew R. Jones, Adam Valdez, JD Schwalm: Doctor Strange – Stephane Ceretti, Susan Pickett, Richard Bluff, Vincent Cirelli, Paul Corbould; Fantastic Beasts and Where to Find Them – Christian Manz, Olly Young, Tim Burke, Pablo Grillo, David Watkins; Miss Peregrine's Home for Peculiar Children – Frazer Churchill, Hal Couzens, Andrew Lockley, Jelmer Boskma, Hayley Williams; Rogue One: A Star Wars Story – John Knoll, Erin Dusseault, Hal Hickel, Nigel Sumner, Neil Corbould	**Deepwater Horizon** – Craig Hammack, Petra Holtorf-Stratton, Jason Snell, John Galloway, Burt Dalton: Allied – Kevin Baillie, Sandra Scott, Brennan Doyle, Viktor Muller, Richard Van Den Bergh; Jason Bourne – Charlie Noble, Dan Barrow, Julian Gnass, Huw Evans, Steve Warner; Silence – Pablo Helman, Brian Barlettani, Ivan Busquets, Juan Garcia, R. Bruce Steinheimer; Sully – Michael Owens, Tyler Kehl, Mark Curtis, Bryan Litson, Steven Riley
Outstanding Visual Effects in an Animated Feature	Outstanding Animated Performance in a Photoreal Feature
**Kubo and the Two Strings** – Travis Knight, Arianne Sutner, Steve Emerson, Brad Schiff: Finding Dory – Angus MacLane, Lindsey Collins, John Halstead, Chris J. Chapman; Moana – Kyle Odermatt, Nicole P. Hearon, Hank Driskill, Ian Gooding; The Little Prince – Mark Osborne, Jinko Gotoh, Pascal Bertrand, Jamie Caliri; Zootopia – Scott Kersavage, Bradford S. Simonsen, David Goetz, Ernest J. Petti	**The Jungle Book – King Louie** – Paul Story, Dennis Yoo, Jack Tema, Andrei Coval: Fantastic Beasts and Where to Find Them – Niffler – Laurent Laban, Gabriel Beauvais-Tremblay, Luc Girard, Romain Rico; Rogue One: A Star Wars Story – Grand Moff Tarkin – Sven Jensen, Jee Young Park, Steve Walton, Cyrus Jam; The Jungle Book – Shere Khan – Benjamin Jones, Julio Del Rio Hernandez, Jake Harrell, James Hood; Warcraft – Durotan – Sunny Wei, Brian Cantwell, Brian Paik, Jee Young Park
Outstanding Animated Performance in an Animated Feature	Outstanding Created Environment in a Photoreal Feature
**Finding Dory – Hank** – Jonathan Hoffman, Steven Clay Hunter, Mark Piretti, Audrey Wong: Kubo and the Two Strings – Kubo – Jeff Riley, Ian Whitlock, Adam Lawthers, Jeremy Spake; Kubo and the Two Strings – Monkey – Andy Bailey, Dobrin Yanev, Kim Slate, Jessica Lynn; Moana – The Mighty Maui – Mack Kablan, Nikki Mull, Matthew Schiller, Marc Thyng	**Doctor Strange – New York City** – Adam Watkins, Martinjn van Herk, Tim Belsher, Jon Mitchell: Deadpool – Freeway Assault – Seth Hill, Jedediah Smith, Laurent Taillefer, Marc-Antoine Paquin; Doctor Strange – London – Brendan Seals, Raphael A. Pimentel, Andrew Zink, Gregory Ng; Rogue One: A Star Wars Story – Scarif Complex – Enrico Damm, Kevin George, Olivier Vernay-Kim, Yannick Dusseault
Outstanding Created Environment in an Animated Feature	Outstanding Virtual Cinematography in a Photoreal Project
**Moana – Motonui Island** – Rob Dressel, Andy Harkness, Brien Hindman, Larry Wu: Finding Dory – Open Ocean Exhibit – Stephen Gustafson, Jack Hattori, Jesse Hollander, Michael Rutter; Kubo and the Two Strings – Hanzo's Fortress – Phil Brotherton, Nick Mariana, Emily Greene, Joe Strasser; Kubo and the Two Strings – Waves – David Horsley, Eric Wachtman, Daniel Leatherdale, Takashi Kuboto	**The Jungle Book** – Bill Pope, Robert Legato, Gary Roberts, John Brennan: Doctor Strange – New York Mirror Dimension – Landis Fields, Mathew Cowie, Frederic Medioni, Faraz Hameed; Game of Thrones – "Battle of the Bastards" – Patrick Tiberius Gehlen, Michelle Blok, Christopher Baird, Drew Wood-Davies; Rogue One: A Star Wars Story – Space Battle – John Levin, Euisung Lee, Steve Ellis, Barry Howell
Outstanding Model in a Photoreal or Animated Project	Outstanding Effects Simulations in a Photoreal Feature
**Deepwater Horizon – Deepwater Horizon Rig** – Kelvin Lau, Jean Bolte, Kevin Sprout, Kim Vongbunyong: Rogue One: A Star Wars Story – Princess Leia – Paul Giacoppo, Gareth Jensen, Todd Vaziri, James Tooley; Rogue One: A Star Wars Story – Star Destroyer – Jay Machado, Marko Chulev, Akira Orikasa, Steven Knipping; Star Trek Beyond – Enterprise – Daniel Nicholson, Rhys Salcombe, Chris Elmer, Andreas Maaninka	**The Jungle Book – Nature Effects** – Oliver Winwood, Fabian Nowak, David Schneider, Ludovic Ramisandraina: Alice Through the Looking Glass – Rust – Klaus Seitschek, Joseph Pepper, Jacob Clark, Cosku Turhan; Doctor Strange – Hong Kong Reverse Destruction – Florian Witzel, Georges Nakhle, Azhul Mohamed, David Kirchner; Rogue One: A Star Wars Story – Jedha Destruction – Miguel Perez Senent, Matt Puchala, Ciaran Moloney, Luca Mignardi
Outstanding Effects Simulations in an Animated Feature	Outstanding Compositing in a Photoreal Feature
**Moana** – Marc Henry Bryant, David Hutchins, John M. Kosnik, Dale Mayeda: Finding Dory – Stephen Gustafson, Allen Hemberger, Joshua Jenny, Matthew Kiyoshi Wong; Kubo and the Two Strings – Water – David Horsley, Peter Stuart, Timur Khodzhaev, Terrance Tornberg; Zootopia – Nicholas Burkard, Moe Eli-Ali, Claudia Chung Sanii, Thom Wickes	**The Jungle Book** – Christoph Salzmann, Masaki Mitchell, Matthew Adams, Max Stummer: Doctor Strange – New York City – Matthew Lane, Jose Fernandez, Ziad Shureih, Amy Shepard; Independence Day: Resurgence – Under the Mothership – Mathew Giampa, Adrian Sutherland, Daniel Lee, Ed Wilkie; X-Men: Apocalypse – Quicksilver Rescue – Jess Burnheim, Alana Newell, Andy Peel, Matthew Shaw

=== Television ===
Outstanding Visual Effects in a Photoreal Episode	Outstanding Supporting Visual Effects in a Photoreal Episode
**Game of Thrones – "Battle of the Bastards"** – Joe Bauer, Steve Kullback, Glenn Melenhorst, Matthew Rouleau, Sam Conway: Black Mirror – "Playtest" – Justin Hutchinson-Chatburn, Russell McLean, Grant Walker, Christopher Gray; Stranger Things – "Demogorgon" – Marc Kolbe, Aaron Sims, Olcun Tan; The Expanse – "Salvage" – Robert Munroe, Clint Green, Kyle Menzies, Tom Turnbull; Westworld – "The Bicameral Mind" – Jay Worth, Elizabeth Castro, Bobo Skipper, Gustav Ahren	**Black Sails – "XX"** – Erik Henry, Terron Pratt, Aladino Debert, Yafei Wu, Paul Stephenson: Penny Dreadful – "The Day Tennyson Died" – James Cooper, Bill Halliday, Sarah McMurdo, Mai-Ling Lee; Roots – "Night One" – Simon Hansen, Paul Kalil, Theo le Roux Preist, Wicus Labuschagne, Max Poolman; The Man in the High Castle – "Volkshalle" – Lawson Deming, Cory Jamiesn, Casi Blume, Nick Chamberlain; Vikings – "The Last Ship" – Dominic Remane, Mike Borrett, Ovidiu Cinazan, Paul Wishart, Paul Byrne
Outstanding Visual Effects in a Commercial	Outstanding Animated Performance in an Episode or Real-Time Project
**John Lewis – Buster the Boxer** – Diarmid Harrison-Murray, Hannah Ruddleston, Fabian Frank, William Laban: Coke Mini – A Mini Marvel – Vincent Cirelli, Michael Perdew, Brendan Seals, Jared Simeth; For Honor – Maxime Luere, Leon Berelle, Dominique Boidin, Remi Kozyra; Titanfall 2 – Become One – Dan Akers, Tiffany Webber, Chris Bedrosian; Waitrose – Coming Home – Jonathan Westley-Wes, Alex Fitzgerald, Jorge Montiel, Adam Droy	**Game of Thrones – "Battle of the Bastards" – Drogon** – James Kinnings, Michael Holzi, Matt Derksen, Joeseph Hoback: Call of Duty: Infinite Warfare – Omar – Bernardo Antoniazzi, Aaron Beck, Jason Greenberg, Chris Barnes; Fantastic Beasts and Where to Find Them – John Montefusco, Michael Cable, Shayne Ryan, Andy Rowan-Robinson; Game of Thrones – "Home" – Emaciated Dragon – Sebastian Lauer, Jonathan Symmonds, Thomas Kutschera, Anthony Sieben
Outstanding Animated Performance in a Commercial	Outstanding Created Environment in an Episode, Commercial, or Real-Time Project
**John Lewis – Buster the Boxer** – Tim van Hussen, David Bryan, Chloe Dawe, Maximillian Mallman: Opel Motorsport – Racing Faces – Lion – Jorge Montiel, Jacob Gonzales, Sauce Vilas, Alberto Lara; SSE – Neon House – Baby Pixel – Jorge Montiel, Daniel Kmet, Sauce Vilas, Peter Agg; Waitrose – Coming Home – Jorge Montiel, Nick Smalley, Andreas Graichen, Alberto Lara	**Game of Thrones – "Battle of the Bastards" – Meereen City** – Deak Ferrand, Dominic Daigle, Francois Croteau, Alexandru Banuta: Black Sails – "XXVIII" – Maroon Island – Thomas Montminy-Brodeur, Deak Ferrand, Pierre Rousseau, Mathieu Lapierre; Dishonored 2 – Clockwork Mansion – Sebastian Mitton, Guillaume Curt, Damien Laurent, Jean-Luc Monnet; Game of Thrones – "The Winds of Winter" – Citadel – Edmong Engelbrecht, Tomoka Matsumura, Edwin Holdsworth, Cheri Fojtik; The Man in the High Castle – "Volkshalle" – Casi Blume, David Andrade, Nick Chamberlain, Lawson Deming
Outstanding Effects Simulations in an Episode, Commercial, or Real-Time Project	Outstanding Compositing in a Photoreal Episode
**Game of Thrones – "Battle of the Bastards" – Meereen City** – Thomas Hullin, Dominik Kirouac, James Dong, Xavier Fourmond: Game of Thrones – "Battle of the Bastards" – Kevin Blom, Sasmit Ranadive, Wanghua Huang, Ben Anderson; John Lewis – Buster the Boxer – Diarmid Harrison-Murray, Tushar Kewlani, Radu Ciubotario, Ben Thomas; Sky – Q – Michael Hunault, Gareth Bell, Paul Donnellan, Joshua Curtis	**Game of Thrones – "Battle of the Bastards" – Retaking Winterfell** – Dominic Hellier, Morgan Jones, Thijs Noij, Caleb Thompson: Black Sails – "XX" – Sailing Ships – Michael Melchiorre, Kevin Bouchez, Heather Hoyland, John Brennick; Game of Thrones – "Battle of the Bastards" – Meereen City – Thomas Montminy-Brodeur, Patrick David, Michael Crane, Joe Salazar; Game of Thrones – "The Door" – Land of Always Winter – Eduardo Diaz, Anibal Del Busto, Angel Rico, Sonsoles Lopez-Aranguren
Outstanding Compositing in a Photoreal Commercial	
**John Lewis – Buster the Boxer** – Tom Harding, Alex Snookes, David Filipe, Andreas Feix: Canal – Kitchen – Dominique Boidin, Leon Berelle, Maxime Luere, Remi Kozyra; Kenzo – Kenzo World – Evan Langley, Benjamin Nowak, Rob Fitzsimmons, Phylicia Feldman; LG – World of Play – Jay Bandlish, Udesh Chetty, Carl Norton; Waitrose – Coming Home – Jonathan Westley-Wes, Gary Driver, Milo Paterson, Nina Mosand	

=== Other categories ===
Outstanding Visual Effects in a Real-Time Project	Outstanding Visual Effects in a Special Venue Project
**Uncharted 4** – Bruce Straley, Eben Cook, Iki Ikram: Call of Duty: Infinite Warfare – Brian Horton, Keith Pope, David Johnson, Tobias Stromvall; Dishonored 2 – Crack in the Slab – Sebastien Mitton, Guillaume Curt, Damien Laurent, Jean-Luc Monnet; Fantastic Beasts and Where to Find Them – Virtual Reality – Andy Rowans-Robinson, Karen Czukernberg, John Montefusco, Corrina Wilson, Resh Sidhu; Gears of War 4 – Kirk Gibbons, Zoe Curnoe, Aryan Hanbeck, Colin Penty; Quantum Break – Janne Pulkkinen, Elmeri Raitanen, Matti Hamalainen, Ville Assinen	**Pirates of the Caribbean – Battle for the Sunken Treasure** – Bill George, Amy Jupiter, Hayden Landis, David Lester: Dream of Anhui – Chris Morley, Lee Hahn, Alex Hessler, KEnt Matheson; Soarin' Over the Horizon – Marianne McLean, Bill George, Hayden Landis, Dorne Huebler, Thomas Tait; Skull Island: Reign of Kong – John Gibson, Arish Fryzee, Sachin Shrestha, Anshul Mathuria; Voyage of Time: The IMAX Experience – Dan Glass, Brett Harding, Tom Debenham, Brian Demonico, Matt Pulliam
Outstanding Visual Effects in a Student Project	
**Breaking Point** – Johannes Franz, Nicole Rothermel, Thomas Sali, Alexander Richter: Elemental – Adrian Meyer, Lena-Carolin Lohfink, Denis Krez, David Bellenbaum; Garden Party – Victor Caire, Gabriel Grapperon, Theophile Dufresne, Lucas Navarro; Shine – Mareike Keller, Dennis Mueller, Meike Mueller	

== Most nominations ==
Nominations	Films/Programs
11	Game of Thrones
7	Rogue One: A Star Wars Story
6	Doctor Strange
6	The Jungle Book
6	Kubo and the Two Strings

== Most wins ==
Wins	Films/Programs
5	Game of Thrones
5	The Jungle Book
3	John Lewis
2	Deepwater Horizon
2	Moana
