= Visual Effects Society Award for Outstanding Animated Character in an Episode or Real-Time Project =

Annual US television award

The Visual Effects Society Award for Outstanding Animated Character in an Episode or Real-Time Project is one of the annual awards given by the Visual Effects Society, starting from 2002. Since its inception, the award's title has gone through several title changes, and one major category shift. First awarded in 2002, the award was titled "Best Character Animation in a Live Action Televised Program, Music Video or Commercial" and given to the best character animation in a televised program, with no specific character cited. This would change in 2004, when the category was re-titled "Outstanding Performance by an Animated Character in a Live Action Broadcast Program", and given to visual effects artists for work on a specified character. The category was again re-titled the following year, this time to "Outstanding Performance by an Animated Character in a Live Action Broadcast Program, Commercial, or Music Video". In 2008, it was titled "Outstanding Animated Character in a Live Action Broadcast Program or Commercial", but changed in 2014 to "Outstanding Performance of an Animated Character in a Commercial, Broadcast Program, or Video Game" and once again the next year to "Outstanding Animated Performance in an Episode, Commercial, or Real-Time Project". In the title changed to "Outstanding Animated Performance in an Episode or Real-Time Project" and, finally, in 2017 to "Outstanding Animated Character in an Episode or Real-Time Project"

== Winners and nominees ==
=== 2000s ===
Best Character Animation in a Live Action Televised Program, Music Video, or Commercial

Year	Program/Video/Commercial	Nominee(s)	Network
2002	Dinotopia	Mike Eames, Quentin Miles, Dadi Einarsson, Ben White	ABC
2002	Blockbuster Entertainment: Kung Fu	Scott Souter, Frank Petzold, Eric Reynolds, Todd Labonte	
2002	Stargate SG-1: "Revelations"	James Tichenor, Craig Van Den Beggelaar, Kevin Little, Adam De Bosch Kemper	Showtime

Outstanding Performance by an Animated Character in a Live Action Broadcast Program

Year	Program	Character	Nominees	Network
2004	Kingdom Hospital	Antubis	Adam de Bosch Kemper, Brian Harder, Patrick Kalyn, Scott Paquin	ABC
2004	Battlestar Galactica: "33"	Cylon	Dustin Adair, Mark Shimer, Jesse Toves, Sean M. Jackson	Sci Fi

Outstanding Performance by an Animated Character in a Live Action Broadcast Program, Commercial, or Music Video

Year	Program	Character	Nominees	Network
2005	Battlestar Galactica: "Fragged"	Cylon Centurion	Andrew Karr, Louie Hinayo, Gary Hughes, Allan Henderson	Sci Fi
2005	Battlestar Galactica: "Valley of Darkness"	Cylon	Dustin Adair, Mark Shimer, Lane Jolly, Steve Graves	Sci Fi
2005	Surface: "Episode 2"	Nimrod	Eric Hance, Rob Bonchune, John Teska, Sean M. Jackson	NBC
2006	GEICO: Chat	The GEICO Gecko	David Hulin, Seth Gollub, Andy Walker, Jenny Bichsel	
2006	Battlestar Galactica: "Downloaded"	Cylon	Ryan Cronin, Louie Hinayo, Andy Asperin, Trevor Adams	Sci Fi
2006	Doctor Who: "Tooth and Claw"	Werewolf	Nicolas Hernandez, Jean-Claude Deguara, Neil Roche, Jean-Yves Audouard	BBC One
2007	The Chemical Brothers: The Salmon Dance	Fatlip Shots	Mike Mellor	
2007	AMP	Paper	Ryan Cronin, Louie Hinayo, Andy Asperin, Trevor Adams	
2007	Ben 10: Race Against Time	Grey Matter Sequence	Brent Young	Cartoon Network
2007	Doctor Who: "Last of the Time Lords"	Ancient Time Lord	Nicolas Hernandez, Adam Burnett, Neil Roche, Jean-Claude Deguara	BBC One
2007	Primeval: "Episode 6"	Predator Animation	Mathieu Vig, Antoine Birot, Simon Thistlethwaite, Kevin O'Sullivan	ITV
2007	Propel: Stress Monster	Stress Monster	Jeff Willette, Sean Andrew Faden, Matthew Hackett, Denis Gauthier	

Outstanding Animated Character in a Live Action Broadcast Program or Commercial

Year	Program	Character	Nominees	Network
2008	Britvic: Drench	Brains Dance	Thomas Tannenberger, Olcun Tan	
2008	Bacardi	Sundance	James J. Atkinson, John Cooper, Phillip Prahl	
2008	Coke: Parade	Stewie Griffin	Ben Smith, Andrew Proctor	

Outstanding Animated Character in a Broadcast Program or Commercial

Year	Program	Character	Nominees	Network
2009	AMF: Caterpillar	The Caterpillar	Steve Beck, Jamie O'Hara, Becky Porter, Robert Sethi	
2009	Évian: Roller Babies	Skating Babies	Jorge Meurer, Jordi Oñate Isal, Emanuele Pavarotti, Wayne Simmons	
2009	Pepsi: The Flight of the Penguin	Penguin	James Dick, Seth Gollub, R. Spencer Lueders, Andy Walker	
2009	Prep & Landing	Wayne	Dave Foley, Mark Mitchell, Hidetaka Yosumi, Leo Sanchez Barbosa	ABC

=== 2010s ===
Year	Program	Character	Nominees	Network
2010	Citroën C3: The Spacebox	Citro	Michael Nauzin, Anne Chatelian, Gregory Mougne, Cedric Nicolas	
2010	Cadbury	Freida Steer	Raphael Pimentel, Thana Siripopungul	
2010	Logitech: Robot	Robot	Robert Ramsdell, Darnell Isom, James Springham, Shelly Dutcher	
2010	Operation: Secret Santa — A Prep & Landing Stocking Stuffer	Lanny	Tony Smeed, Chad Sellers, Patrick Osborne, John Wong	ABC
2011	Canal+: The Bear	The Bear	Guillaume Ho Tsong Fang, Olivier Mitonneau, Michael Nauzin, Laurent Creusot	
2011	Audi A6 Avant: Hummingbird	The Hummingbird	Tom Bussell, Jorge Meurer	
2011	Carl's Jr.: Robot	Robot	Matt Heimlich, Robert Ramsdell, Frederic Hopp, Philip Ineno	
2011	Game of Thrones: "Fire and Blood"		Henry Badgett, Mark A. Brown, Rafael Morant, James Sutton	HBO
2012	Game of Thrones	Training the Dragons	Irfan Celik, Florian Friedmann, Ingo Schachner, Chris Stenner	HBO
2012	Hallmark: Motherbrid	Motherbird	Vincent Baertsoen, Kevin Ives, Laurent Makowski, Joshua Merck	
2012	Jimmy Kimmel Live!	Ted	James W. Brown, Brad Fox, Ross Nakamura, Jeffrey Woo	ABC
2012	Sinbad: "Pilot"		Andrew Guest, James Moxon, James Reid, Greg Spencer	Sky One
2013	PETA: 98% Human	Apes	Vincent Baertsoen, Alexandre Allain, Henning Koczy	
2013	Three: #DancePonyDance	The Pony	Carsten Keller, Jake Mengers, Tim van Hussen	
2013	Game of Thrones	Raising the Dragons	Philip Meyer, Ingo Schachner, Travis Nobles, Florian Friedmann	HBO
2013	Smithwick's: Squirrel	Squirrel	Tom Bussell, Jorge Meurer, Tom Raynor, Leonardo Costa	
2013	Toy Story of Terror!		Paul Aichele, Kiki Mei Kee Poh, Andrew Coats	ABC

Outstanding Performance of an Animated Character in a Commercial, Broadcast Program, or Video Game

Year	Program	Character	Nominees	Network
2014	SSE: Maya	Maya	Jorge Meurer, Alex Hammond, Daniel Kmet, Philippe Moine	
2014	Freetime by Freesat	Sheldon	Russell Dodgson, Grant S.L. Walker, Juan Sebastian Niño Florez, Amar Chundavadra	
2014	Game of Thrones	Drogon	Philip Meyer, Thomas Kutschera, Igor Majdandzic, Mark Spindler	HBO
2014	John Lewis Christmas Advert: Monty the Penguin	Monty the Penguin	Diarmid Harrison-Murray, Tim van Hussen, Amir Bazazi, George Kyparissous	

Outstanding Animated Performance in an Episode, Commercial, or Real-Time Project

Year	Program	Character	Nominees	Network
2015	SSE: Pier	Orangatan	Jorge Meurer, Sauce Vilas, Daniel Kmet, Sam Driscoll	
2015	Game of Thrones: "The Dance of Dragons"	Drogon Arena Rescue	James Kinnings, Michael Holzl, Joseph Hoback, Matt Derksen	HBO
2015	Game of Thrones: "Mother's Mercy"	Wounded Drogon	Florian Friedmann, Jonathan Symmonds, Sven Schwarz, Sebastian Lauer	HBO
2015	Sainsbury's: Christmas Advert	Mogs	Juan Sebastian Niño Florez, Chris Hurtt, Joseph Henson, Gez Wright	

Outstanding Animated Performance in an Episode or Real-Time Project

Year	Program	Character	Nominees	Network
2016	Game of Thrones: "Battle of the Bastards"	Drogon	James Kinnings, Michael Holzi, Matt Derksen, Joeseph Hoback	HBO
2016	Call of Duty: Infinite Warfare	Staff Sergeant Usef Omar	James Kinnings, Michael Holzl, Joseph Hoback, Matt Derksen	
2016	Fantastic Beasts and Where to Find Them VR	Graphorn	John Montefusco, Michael Cable, Shayne Ryan, Andrew Rowan-Robinson	
2016	Game of Thrones: "Home"	Emaciated Dragon	Sebastian Lauer, Jonathan Symmonds, Thomas Kutschera, Anthony Sieben	HBO

Outstanding Animated Character in an Episode or Real-Time Project

Year	Program	Character	Nominees	Network
2017	Game of Thrones: "The Spoils of War"	Drogon Loot Train Attack	Murray Stevenson, Jason Snyman, Jenn Taylor, Florian Friedmann	HBO
2017	Black Mirror: "Metalhead"	Dog	Steven Godfrey, Stafford Lawrence, Andrew Robertson, Iestyn Roberts	Netflix
2017	Game of Thrones: "Beyond the Wall"	Zombie Polar Bear	Paul Story, Todd Labonte, Matthew Muntean, Nicholas Wilson	HBO
2017	Game of Thrones: "Eastwatch"	Drogon Meets Jon	Jonathan Symmonds, Thomas Kutschera, Philipp Winterstein, Andreas Krieg	HBO
2018	Lost in Space	Robot	Chad Shattuck, Paul Zeke, Julia Flanagan, Andrew McCartney	Netflix
2018	Cycles	Rae	Jose Luis Gomez Diaz, Edward Robbins, Jorge Ruiz, Jose Luis 'Weecho' Velasquez	
2018	Nightflyers: "All That We Have Found"	Eris	Peter Giliberti, James Chretien, Ryan Cromie, Cesar Dacol Jr.	Syfy
2018	Spider-Man	Doc Ock	Brian Wyser, Henrique Naspolini, Sophie Brennan, William Salyers	
2019	Stranger Things	Tom/Bruce Monster	Joseph Dubé-Arsenault, Antoine Barthod, Frederick Gagnon, Xavier Lafarge	Netflix
2019	Lady and the Tramp	Tramp	Thiago Lima Martins, Arslan Elver, Stanislas Paillereau, Martine Chartrand	Disney+
2019	The Mandalorian: "Chapter 2: The Child"	Mud Horn	Terence Bannon, Rudy Massar, Hugo Leygnac	Disney+
2019	The Umbrella Academy: "We Only See Each Other at Weddings and Funerals"	Pogo	Aidan Martin, Craig Young, Olivier Beierlein, Laurent Herveic	Netflix

=== 2020s ===
Year	Program	Character	Nominees	Network
2020	The Mandalorian: "Chapter 13: The Jedi"	The Child	John Rosengrant, Peter Clarke, Scott Patton, Hal Hickel	Disney+
2020	The Crown: "The Balmoral Test"	Imperial Stag	Ahmed Gharraph, Ross Burgess, Gabriela Ruch Salmeron, Joel Best	Netflix
2020	The Mandalorian: "Chapter 9: The Marshal"	Krayt Dragon	Paul Kavanagh, Zaini Mohamed Jalani, Michal Kriukow, Nihal Friedel	Disney+
2020	Timmy Failure: Mistakes Were Made	Total	Maxime Masse, Hennadii Prykhodko, Luc Girard, Sophie Burie	Disney+
2021	The Witcher: "A Grain of Truth	Nivellen the Cursed Man	Marko Chulev, Rasely Ma, Mike Beaulieu, Robin Witzsche	Netflix
2021	Lisey's Story: "Lisey's Story"	The Long Boy	Mohsen Mousavi, Salauddin "Sallu" Kazi, Mattias Brunosson, Pablovsky Ramos-Nieves	Apple TV+
2021	Love, Death & Robots: "Snow in the Desert"	Hirald	Maxime Luere, Zoé Pelegrin-Bomel, Laura Guerreiro, Florent Duport	Netflix
2021	The Witcher: "What Is Lost"	Leshy Eskel	Hannes Faupel, Stéphane Paccolat, Ivan Cadena Ayala, Laurent Fortin	Netflix
2021	Y: The Last Man	Ampersand	Mike Beaulieu, Michael Dharney, Peter Pi, Aidana Sakhvaliyeva	FX on Hulu
2022	The Umbrella Academy	Pogo	Aidan Martin, Hannah Dockerty, Olivier Beierlein, Miae Kang	Netflix
2022	She-Hulk: Attorney at Law	She-Hulk	Elizabeth Bernard, Jan Philip Cramer, Edwina Ting, Andrew Park	Disney+
2022	Skull & Bones	Sam	Jonas Skoog, Jonas Törnqvist, Goran Milic, Jonas Vikström	
2022	The Callisto Protocol	Jacob Lee	Martin Contel, Glauco Longhi, Jorge Jimenez, Atsushi Seo	

== Programs with multiple awards ==
3 awards

- Game of Thrones (HBO)

== Programs with multiple nominations ==
11 nominations

- Game of Thrones (HBO)

4 nominations

- Battlestar Galactica (Sci Fi)

2 nominations

- Doctor Who (BBC)
- The Witcher (Netflix)
