= Max Dennison =

Irish special effects artist

Max Dennison (born 1969 or 1970) is a digital matte painter and illustrator from Ireland.

Originally from Kildimo in County Limerick, Dennison attended the Villiers School in Limerick city. He attended university in England, and graduated from Leicester Polytechnic (later known as De Montfort University) in 1992.

Dennison, who "landed his first job in special effects in 1996", worked on John Madden's Shakespeare in Love (1998). He also worked on Peter Jackson's The Lord of the Rings series, and was "lead matte painter" at Weta Digital for the trilogy. It was the team of Dennison, Yannick Dusseault, Roger Kupelian and Mathieu Raynault who were nominated for the 2003 VES award for "Best Matte Painting in a Motion Picture" (The Lord of the Rings: The Two Towers).

Having worked on Revenge of the Sith for Industrial Light & Magic in 2004, between 2005 and 2006 he worked on X-Men: The Last Stand, The Da Vinci Code and Bryan Singer's Superman Returns. In 2007, he set up a visual effects company, Matte Painting UK.

Dennison worked on the Chernobyl miniseries (2019), and received the Outstanding Special Visual Effects in a Supporting Role award for this work at the 71st Primetime Creative Arts Emmy Awards.

As of 2019, he was a visual effects supervisor with DNEG and was living in London.
