= Visual Effects Society Award for Outstanding Created Environment in an Episode, Commercial, or Real-Time Project =

Annual US television award

The Visual Effects Society Award for Outstanding Created Environment in an Episode, Commercial, or Real-Time Project is one of the annual awards given by the Visual Effects Society starting from 2004. The award was originally titled "Outstanding Created Environment in a Live Action Broadcast Program", and changed in 2005 to "Outstanding Created Environment in a Live Action Broadcast Program, Commercial, or Music Video". It was again changed in 2009, this time to "Outstanding Created Environment in a Feature Motion Picture", and again in 2011 to "Outstanding Created Environment in a Live Action Feature Motion Picture". Before its final change in 2015, to its current title, it was re-titled in 2014 to "Outstanding Created Environment in a Photoreal/Live Action Feature Motion Picture".

== Winners and nominees ==
=== 2000s ===
Outstanding Created Environment in a Live Action Broadcast Program

Year	Program	Environment	Nominee(s)	Network
2004	Spartacus	Opening	Eric Grenaudier, Anthony Ocampo, Cedric Tomacruz, Michael Cook	USA
2004	Smallville: "Crusade"	"Is it a bird? Is it a plane?" Sequence	John H. Han, Brian Ali Harding, Terry Shigemitsu, Noriaki Matsumoto	The WB
2004	Star Trek: Enterprise: "Storm Front, Part II"	Dogfight Over NYC Sequence	Pierre Drolet, Fred Pienkos, Eddie Robison, Sean M. Scott	UPN

Outstanding Created Environment in a Live Action Broadcast Program, Commercial, or Music Video

Year	Program	Environment	Nominee(s)	Network
2005	Into the West: "Wheel to the Stars", "Manifest Destiny", "Dreams and Schemes"		Cedric Tomacruz, David Bailey, Valeri Pfahning	TNT
2005	Motorola: PEBL		James Gaczkowski, Daniel Thron, Janelle Croshaw, Greg Teegarden	
2005	Nine Inch Nails: Only		Janelle Croshaw, Greg Teegarden, James Gaczkowski, Scott Edelstein	
2006	Elizabeth I: "Part 1"		David A.T. Bowman, Jimmy Kiddell, Russell Horth, Gurel Mehmet	HBO
2006	Coke: The Greatest Gift		David Hulin, Nathan Hughes, Jenny Bichsel, Andy Walker	
2006	Monday Night Football	Remote Open	Luke McDonald, Danny Braet, Minoru Sasaki, Josh McGuire	ESPN
2007	Bury My Heart at Wounded Knee	002_05	Phi Tran, Matthew Lee, Martin Hilke, Justin Mitchell	HBO
2007	Smallville	City of Metropolis	David Vickery, Philippe LePrince, Trina Roy and Jolene McCaffrey	The CW
2007	Subaru: Peel Out		Graham Fyffe, Christopher Nichols, Chris Bankoff, Daniel Buck	
2007	Tin Man: "Into the Storm"		Les Quinn, Ken Lee, Andrew Domachowski, Jonah West	Sci Fi
2007	Ugly Betty: "A League of Their Own"		Christopher D. Martin, Michael Cook, Cedric Tomacruz	ABC

Outstanding Created Environment in a Broadcast Program or Commercial

Year	Program	Environment	Nominee(s)	Network
2008	John Adams: "Join or Die"	Boston Harbor	Paul Graff, Robert Stromberg, Adam Watkins	HBO
2008	Audi: Living Room	Living Room	Graham Fyffe, Christopher Nichols, Chris Bankoff, Daniel Buck	
2008	Heroes	Tokyo	Meliza Fermin, Michael Cook, Daniel Kumiega, Anthony Ocampo	NBC
2008	Wrigley's 5	Fruit Shredder	Ludo Fealy, Dean Robinson, Adam Leary	
2009	V: "Pilot"	Atrium and Ship Interiors	Trevor Adams, Chris Irving, David R. Morton, Chris Zapara	ABC
2009	AMC Theatres: Coke	Magic Chairs	Dariush Derakhshani, Steve Cummings, Harry Michalakeas, Robert Nederhorst	
2009	Assassin's Creed: Lineage: "Episode 1"	Duke of Milan Assassination	Nadine Homier, Joseph Kasparian, Mathieu Lalonde, Christian Morin	
2009	FlashForward: "No More Good Days"	Freeway Overpass	Colin Feist, Paul Ghezzo, Roger Kupelian, Steven Meyer	ABC

=== 2010s ===
Outstanding Created Environment in a Live Action Broadcast Program

Year	Program	Environment	Nominee(s)	Network
2010	The Pacific: "Iwo Jima"	Battle of Iwo Jima	Marco Recuay, Morgan McDermott, Nicholas Lund-Ulrich	HBO
2010	Boardwalk Empire	Boardwalk	Robert Stromberg, Paul Graff, Brian Sales, Brian Pace	HBO
2010	Boardwalk Empire: "Family Limitation"		J. John Corbett, Matthew Conner, Brendan Fitzgerald, Jun Zhang	HBO
2010	The Event: "To Keep Us Safe"		Michael Cook, Jon Rosenthal, Ragui Hanna, Ryan Wieber	NBC

Outstanding Created Environment in a Broadcast Program or Commercial

Year	Program	Environment	Nominee(s)	Network
2011	Game of Thrones	The Wall	Markus Kuha, Dante Harbridge Robinson, Damien Macé, Fani Vassiadi	HBO
2011	Audi A6 Avant: Hummingbird		Amaan Akram, Tom Bussell, Alex Hammond	
2011	Boardwalk Empire: "Two Boats and a Lifeguard"		Matthew Conner, Robert Stromberg	HBO
2011	Pan Am: "Pilot"	Worldport Terminal	Michael Cook, Jon Rosenthal, Ragui Hanna, Ryan Wieber	ABC
2011	Terra Nova	Terra Nova	Mike Bozulich, Eric Hance, Kevin Kipper, David R. Morton	Fox
2012	Game of Thrones	Pyke	Rene Borst, Thilo Ewers, Adam Figielski, Jonas Stuckenbrock	HBO
2012	Call of Duty: Eclipse- Surprise		Chris Bayol, Steve Beck, Gawain Liddiard, Robert Sethi	Activision
2012	5 Gum: Choose Your Energy		Kaan Atilla, Kevin Gillen, Isaac Irvin, Brandon Lester	
2012	Sinbad		James Moxon, Lyndall Spagnoletti, Greg Spencer	Sky One
2013	Game of Thrones: "The Climb"		Patrick Zentis, Mayur Patel, Nitin Singh, Tim Alexander	HBO
2013	Inseparable: "Chernobyl"		Dmitry Ovcharenko, Igor Chopenko, Dmitry Eremenko, Andrey Bogdanov	
2013	Hell on Wheels: "Big Bad Wolf"		Steven Meyer, Matt von Brock, Mitch Gates, Antonio Chang	AMC
2013	Liberty Holdings Limited: Answer		Greg Teegarden, Kevin Bouchez, Brian Creasey, Kurt Lawson	

Outstanding Created Environment in a Commercial, Broadcast Program, or Video Game

Year	Program	Environment	Nominee(s)	Network
2014	Game of Thrones	Bravos Establisher	Rene Borst, Christian Zilliken, Jan Burda, Steffen Metzner	HBO
2014	Coke: "Snowy Forest"	Snowy Forest	Tom Bardwell, Kevin Ives, Kyle Cody, Jimmy Gass	
2014	Penny Dreadful: "Séance"		Mathew Borrett, Lorne Kwechansky, Graham Day, Jason Gougeon	Showtime
2014	War Thunder: Battlefield		Andrey Bogdanov, Mykhailo Datsyk, Dmitry Ovcharenko, Ekaterina Bogdanova	Gaijin Entertainment

Outstanding Created Environment in an Episode, Commercial, or Real-Time Project

Year	Program	Environment	Nominee(s)	Network
2015	Game of Thrones	Volantis	Dominic Piché, Christine Leclerc, Patrice Poissant, Thomas Montminy Brodeur	HBO
2015	Black Sails	Charles Town Harbor	Aladino V. Debert, Matt Dougan, Greg Teegarden, Ken Mitchel Jones	Starz
2015	Game of Thrones: "The Dance of Dragons"	Drogon Arena	B.R. Rajeev, Loganathan Perumal, Ramesh Shanker, Anders Ericson	HBO
2015	Vikings	Paris	Paul Wishart, Karol Wlodarczyk, Thomas Grant Morrison, Matt Ralph	History
2016	Game of Thrones: "Battle of the Bastards"	Meereen	Deak Ferrand, Dominic Daigle, Francois Croteau, Alexandru Banuta	HBO
2016	Black Sails: "XXVIII."	Maroon Island	Thomas Montminy Brodeur, Deak Ferrand, Pierre Rousseau, Mathieu Lapierre	Starz
2016	Dishonored 2	Clockwork Mansion	Sébastien Mitton, Guillaume Curt, Damien Laurent, Jean-Luc Monnet	Bethesda Softworks
2016	Game of Thrones: "The Winds of Winter"	The Citadel	Edmond Engelbrecht, Tomoka Matsumura, Ed Holdsworth, Cheri Fojtik	HBO
2016	The Man in the High Castle	Volkshalle	Casi Blume, David Andrade, Nick Chamberlain, Lawson Deming	Amazon
2017	Game of Thrones: "Beyond the Wall"	Frozen Lake	Dani Villalba, Antonio Lado, Jose Luis Barreiro, Isaac de la Pompa	HBO
2017	Assassin's Creed Origins	City of Memphis	Patrick Limoges, Jean-Sebastian Guay, Mikael Guaveia, Vincent Lombardo	Ubisoft
2017	Game of Thrones: "Eastwatch"	Eastwatch	Patrice Poissant, Deak Ferrand, Dominic Daigle, Gabriel Morin	HBO
2017	Still Star-Crossed	City	Rafa Solorzano, Isaac de la Pompa, Jose Luis Barreiro, Óscar Perea Marcos	ABC
2017	Stranger Things: "Chapter Nine: The Gate"	The Gate	Casi Blume, David Andrade, Nick Chamberlain, Lawson Deming	Netflix
2018	Lost in Space: "Impact"	Impact Area	Philip Engström, Kenny Vähäkari, Jason Martin, Martin Bergquist	Netflix
2018	Cycles	The House	Michael R.W. Anderson, Jeff Gipson, Jose Luis Gomez Diaz, Edward Robbins	
2018	The Deuce	42nd Street	John Bair, Vance Miller, Jose L. Marin, Steve Sullivan	HBO
2018	The Handmaid's Tale: "June"	Fenway Park	Patrick Zentis, Kevin McGeagh, Leo Bovell, Zachary Dembinski	Hulu
2018	The Man in the High Castle	Reichsmarschall Ceremony	Casi Blume, Michael Eng, Ben McDougal, Sean Meyers	Amazon
2019	Game of Thrones: "The Iron Throne"	The Red Keep	Carlos Patrick De Leon, Alonso Bocanegra, Marcela A. Silva, Benjamin Ross	HBO
2019	The Dark Crystal: Age of Resistance	The Endless Forest	Sule Bryan, Charles Chorein, Christian Waite, Martyn Hawkins	Netflix
2019	Lost in Space: "Precipice"	The Trench	Philip Engström, Benjamin Bernon, Martin Bergquist, Xuan Prada	Netflix
2019	The Mandalorian	Nevarro Town	Alex Murtaza, Yanick Gaudreau, Marco Tremblay, Maryse Bouchard	Disney+

=== 2020s ===
Year	Program	Environment	Nominee(s)	Network
2020	The Mandalorian: "Chapter 15: The Believer"	Morak Jungle	Enrico Damm, Johanes Kurnia, Phi Tran, Tong Tran	Disney+
2020	Brave New World	New London	Guy Williams, Justin Gros-Désir, Markus Sterner, Ryan Clarke	Peacock
2020	Cyberpunk 2077	Night City	Jakub Knapik, Lucjan Więcek	CD Projekt
2020	Lovecraft Country: "Rewind 1921"	Tulsa 1921	Patrice Poissant, Pauline Lavelle, Mohamed Abdou Elhakim, Alan Lam	HBO
2020	The Mandalorian: "Chapter 12: The Siege"	Nevarro Canyon	Kevin George, Aaron Barr, Piotr Tatar, Abel Milanés Betancourt	Disney+
2021	Sheba	Hope Reef	Henrique Campanha, Baptiste Roy, Luca Veronese, Timothee Maron	
2021	Foundation	Trantor Cityscape	Samuel Simanjuntak, Melaina Mace, Benjamin Ruiz, Alessandro Vastalegna	Apple TV+
2021	Hawkeye: "Echoes"	Manhattan Bridge	Nicholas Hodgson, David Abbott, Nick Cattell, Jin Choi	Disney+
2021	Hawkeye: "So This Is Christmas?"	Rockefeller Center	John O'Connell, Tiffany Yung, Orion Terry, Ho Kyung Ahn	Disney+
2022	The Lord of the Rings: The Rings of Power: "Adar"	Númenor City	Dan Wheaton, Nico Delbecq, Dan LeTarte, Julien Gauthier	Amazon Prime Video
2022	Andor: "Reckoning"	Ferrix	Pedro Santos, Chris Ford, Jeff Carson-Bartzis, Alex Murtaza	Disney+
2022	The Book of Boba Fett: "In the Name of Honor"	Mos Espa	Daniel Schmid Leal, Phi Tran, Hasan Ilhan, Steve Wang	Disney+
2022	The Lord of the Rings: The Rings of Power: "Adrift"	Khazud Dûm	James Ogle, Péter Bujdosó, Lon Krung, Shweta Bhatnagar	Amazon Prime Video
