= North Circular Road, Limerick =

Road in Limerick, Ireland

The North Circular Road (Irish: An Cuarbhóthar Thuaidh), often referred to locally as NCR, is a residential road on the northside of Limerick, Ireland.

== Description ==
The west end of the North Circular Road contains mostly large detached houses. This stretch of the road and its surroundings are among the most affluent areas in Limerick. It is linked to the Ennis Road by Fortmary Park and borders Bracken Gardens and Ashbrook. The east end of the road is predominantly middle class and contains mostly semi-detached houses alongside some apartment blocks. At this end, the North Circular Road is linked to Roses Avenue, the Lower Shelbourne Road and Clanmaurice Avenue.

== Amenities ==
The Ardhú Bar, a local pub, is situated at the top of Roses Avenue near the Ennis Road. Westfield Park is a public park next to the housing estate of the same name which is located off the North Circular Road. The park's walkways are linked by road crossing to the pathway along the River Shannon. There is a Roman Catholic church, the Church of Our Lady of the Rosary, situated between the North Circular Road and the Ennis Road.

== Education ==
John F. Kennedy Memorial School, a primary school for boys, and Salesian Infant School Fernbank for girls are located on the east side of the North Circular Road, as is the large public secondary school for boys Ardscoil Rís. Salesian Secondary School was a public secondary school for girls previously situated on the North Circular Road. However, in 2015, Salesian merged with St Nessan's Community College and formed Thomond Community College, based at St Nessan's former location in Woodview, Caherdavin.

The North Circular Road is also home to Villiers School, a private, Protestant secondary school.
