= North Circular Road (film) =

2015 film

North Circular Road is a 2015 feature film, and the debut of Irish writer and director Donal Nugent. It tells the story of Janice Cadogan, a weather forecaster who begins to see ghostly apparitions in her new home on Dublin's North Circular Road.

It features actors Lorna Larkin, Pat O'Donnell, Vanessa Richter, Patrick Molloy and Orla McGovern.

In December 2015, it won Best Film, Best Director, Best Actress and Best Supporting Actress at the Monaco International Film Festival.
