= GEICO Gecko =

Insurance company mascot

- First appearance: 1999
- Voiced by: Jake Wood

In-universe information
- Species: Gecko
- Gender: Male

The GEICO Gecko is an advertising mascot for the insurance company GEICO, first used in 1999.

== History ==
The character is an anthropomorphic gecko with a British accent. He was conceptualized by The Martin Agency and animated by Framestore. While the Martin Agency's president and creative director Mike Hughes has been credited as the creator of the GEICO Gecko, he has said "I didn't develop the gecko. In fact I tried to kill it. Four times. No kidding." As of 2026, he is voiced by Jake Wood in the United States. He has previously been voiced by actors Kelsey Grammer, Andrew Randall, Thom Bromhead, and Dave Kelly. Originally having a posh accent, it eventually evolved into a Cockney style.

The GEICO gecko has featured in over 150 commercials. In one commercial, it was revealed that his name was Martin. His signature slogan is "15 minutes could save you 15% or more on car insurance".

In 2005, the gecko was voted "America's favorite advertising icon", and was put on the Madison Avenue Walk of Fame. Fortune magazine ranked Geico's "always clever" commercials 24th on the list "100 Great Things About America" in 2011. Business Insider readers voted the gecko as "Best Spokesanimal" in 2012.

A 2008 poll by Marketing Evaluations found the gecko was the second most-loved advertising icon among 600 characters. A poll in 2019 by Crestline Custom Promotional Products found he was the third most recognizable commercial character on TV among the American public, with 93% recognition. A 2022 poll by Ad Age and the Harris polling company found the GEICO Gecko was the most-liked insurance mascot, with 75 percent of respondents feeling favorably towards the mascot and 98% recognizing it.

Articles in The New York Times and Fortune said the gecko marked the introduction of humor into insurance advertising, followed by characters such as Flo for Progressive and Mayhem for Allstate.

A book allegedly written by the gecko was published in April 2013. In 2024, a "digital documentary" was created about the mascot. An "AI-generated" version of the character appeared on Azzi Fudd's podcast in 2026.

== Development ==
The GEICO Gecko debuted in 1999 after a strike from the Screen Actors Guild prevented advertisers from using live actors. The gecko was chosen because the company's name was frequently mispronounced as "gecko". He was initially supposed to be a temporary mascot but was kept on, and in 2004 was made the official spokesperson of the Martin Agency.
