= David Hulin =

David James Hulin
- Born: Bristol, England
- Education: Bristol Cathedral Choir School, Department of Creative Industries, UWE, Bristol, University for the Creative Arts, Saint Martin's School of Art,
- Occupations: Animation Director, Creative Director, Visual Effects Artist
- Notable work: GEICO Gecko, M&M's, Harry Potter, Walking with,
- Awards: Emmy, British Television Advertising Craft Award, International Teleproduction Society Monitor Award, London Effects and Animation Award, Royal Television Society Craft and Design Award, International 3D Award, Visual Effects Society, Ottawa Animation Festival
- Website: https://www.davidhulin.com

David Hulin is a British born Animation Director and VFX Director based in New York, best known for creating iconic animated characters such as the GEICO Gecko, Post Office Ants (UK), Nigel the Xyzal Owl, The Lactaid Cow, as well as creatively leading many other iconic campaigns for FedEx, GE, Pepsi, M&Ms, Speedy (Alka Seltzer). David has gained a great reputation for his significant contribution to the Computer Graphics and Visual Effects industry over the last two decades.

== Early life ==
Hulin was born in Bristol, England and studied at Bristol Cathedral Choir School. Choosing to pursue a career in the Arts he studied Art Foundation at Department of Creative Industries, UWE, Bristol before making the decision to specialize in animation at University for the Creative Arts which was the first BA (Hons) degree in Animation available in Europe. During his degree Hulin split his time between animation and Film and after finishing a documentary project at Framestore during his graduate year was lucky enough to win a rare post grad scholarship opportunity at Saint Martin's School of Art designed to encourage more traditionally trained artists into a then computer programmer driven industry.

== Career ==
After graduating Saint Martin's School of Art, Hulin joined Framestore's then small CG animation team. Working amongst some of the world's foremost visual effects artists, he gained valuable experience and contributed to many award-winning commercial projects, TV series such as Walking With Beasts, Dinotopia, Arabian Nights and Merlin, as well as film projects such as Harry Potter II and III. With a diverse experience in CG animation, Hulin seized the opportunity to move to New York to set up Framestore's US operation and build its CG department from scratch. It was shortly after, in 2005, that Hulin was called upon to redesign the GEICO Gecko and remained the Animation Director for 12 successful years.

After building the CG department, David moved on to focus on his career as an Animation Director. Hulin has been passionately involved in developing animated characters and brand icons. His creative leadership and Brand relationships have seen successes in numerous animated campaigns; Pepsi - chicken, two FedEx Super Bowl spots; Stick and Pigeon; iconic GE spots; Crane, Ellie, Scarecrow, Tree and Mammoth (never aired), nearly 100 GEICO Gecko commercials, Sour Patch Kids, the well loved M&M's characters and most recently Nigel the Owl for Xyzal. Hulin was also integral in the development of Framestore's proprietary real-time animation system, which has been deployed for many major brands with animated icons.

After his directorial debut with a campaign of commercials for the GEICO Gecko in 2006, Hulin has also been involved in creative development of content for such clients as Coors, Samsung, Time Warner, Prudential, Charmin, Breath Right, EA, Corning, M&M's. and Xyzal. Through his central focus of Animation and VFX Hulin continues to collaborate with brands he feels strongly about through his Studio at Free Range VFX .

== Awards ==
Hulin has won many awards for his work including a Prime time Emmy a Visual Effects Society award and the Best Animated character at the Ottawa Animation Festival.
