= 23rd Visual Effects Society Awards =

2025 visual effects awards ceremony for 2024 works

23rd Visual Effects Society Awards

February 11, 2025

Outstanding Visual Effects in a Photoreal Feature:
Kingdom of the Planet of the Apes

Outstanding Visual Effects in a Photoreal Episode:
Shōgun: "Anjin"

The 23rd Visual Effects Society Awards is an awards ceremony presented by the Visual Effects Society to recognize the best in visual effects in film, television and other media in 2024. Nominations were announced on January 14, 2025. The ceremony took place on February 11, 2025 at the Beverly Hilton in Hollywood and was hosted by the Sklar Brothers.

== Winners and nominees ==
Winners will be listed first and in bold.

=== Honorary Awards ===
Georges Méliès Award:

- **Dr. Jacquelyn Ford Morie**

Creative Excellence Award

- **Hiroyuki Sanada**

Visionary Award

- **Takashi Yamazaki**

=== Film ===
Outstanding Visual Effects in a Photoreal Feature	Outstanding Supporting Visual Effects in a Photoreal Feature
**Kingdom of the Planet of the Apes – Erik Winquist, Julia Neighly, Paul Story, Danielle Immerman, Rodney Burke**; Better Man – Luke Millar, Andy Taylor, David Clayton, Keith Herft, Peter Stubbs; Dune: Part Two – Paul Lambert, Brice Parker, Stephen James, Rhys Salcombe, Gerd Nefzer; Mufasa: The Lion King – Adam Valdez, Barry St. John, Audrey Ferrara, Daniel Fotheringham; Twisters – Ben Snow, Mark Soper, Florian Witzel, Susan Greenhow, Scott Fisher	**Civil War – David Simpson, Michelle Rose, Freddy Salazar, Chris Zeh, J.D. Schwalm**; Blitz – Andrew Whitehurst, Sona Pak, Theo Demiris, Vincent Poitras, Hayley Williams; Horizon: An American Saga – Chapter 1 – Jason Neese, Armen Fetulagian, Jamie Neese, J.P. Jaramillo; Nosferatu – Angela Barson, Lisa Renney, David Scott, Dave Cook, Pavel Ságner; Young Woman and the Sea – Richard Briscoe, Carrie Rishel, Jeremy Robert, Stéphane Dittoo, Ivo Jivkov
Outstanding Visual Effects in an Animated Feature	Outstanding Character in a Photoreal Feature
**The Wild Robot – Chris Sanders, Jeff Hermann, Jeff Budsberg, Jacob Hjort Jensen**; Inside Out 2 – Kelsey Mann, Mark Nielsen, Sudeep Rangaswamy, Bill Watral; Moana 2 – Carlos Cabral, Tucker Gilmore, Ian Gooding, Gabriela Hernandez; Transformers One – Frazer Churchill, Fiona Chilton, Josh Cooley, Stephen King; Ultraman: Rising – Hayden Jones, Sean M. Murphy, Shannon Tindle, Mathieu Vig	**Better Man: "Robbie Williams" – Milton Ramírez, Andrea Merlo, Seoungseok Charlie Kim, Eteuati Tema**; Kingdom of the Planet of the Apes: "Noa" – Rachael Dunk, Andrei Coval, John Sore, Niels Peter Kaagaard; Kingdom of the Planet of the Apes: "Raka" – Seoungseok Charlie Kim, Giorgio Lafratta, Tim Teramoto, Aidan Martin; Mufasa: The Lion King: "Taka" – Klaus Skovbo, Valentina Rosselli, Eli De Koninck, Amelie Talarmain
Outstanding Animated Character in an Animated Feature	Outstanding Created Environment in a Photoreal Feature
**The Wild Robot: "Roz" – Fabio Lignini, Yukinori Inagaki, Owen Demers, Hyun Huh**; Inside Out 2: "Anxiety" – Alexander Alvarado, Brianne Francisco, Amanda Wagner, Brenda Lin Zhang; Thelma the Unicorn: "Vic Diamond" – Guillaume Arantes, Adrien Montero, Anne-Claire Leroux, Gaspard Roche; Wallace & Gromit: Vengeance Most Fowl: "Gromit" – Jo Fenton, Alison Evans, Andy Symanowski, Emanuel Nevado	**Dune: Part Two: "Arrakeen Basin" – Daniel Rhein, Daniel Anton Fernández, Marc James Austin, Christopher Anciaume**; Civil War: "Washington, D.C." – Matthew Chandler, James Harmer, Robert Moore, Adrien Zeppieri; Gladiator II: "Rome" – Oliver Kane, Stefano Farci, John Seru, Frederick Vallee; Wicked: "Emerald City" – Alan Lam, Steve Bevins, Deepali Negi, Miguel Sánchez López-Ruíz
Outstanding Created Environment in an Animated Feature	Outstanding Effects Simulations in a Photoreal Feature
**The Wild Robot: "The Forest" – John Wake, He Jung Park, Woojin Choi, Shane Glading**; Kung Fu Panda 4: "Juniper City" – Benjamin Lippert, Ryan Prestridge, Sarah Vawter, Peter Maynez; Transformers One: "Iacon City" – Alex Popescu, Geoffrey Lebreton, Ryan Kirby, Hussein Nabeel; Wallace & Gromit: Vengeance Most Fowl: "Aqueduct" – Matt Perry, Dave Alex Riddett, Matt Sanders, Howard Jones	**Dune: Part Two: "Atomic Explosions and Wormriding" – Nicholas Papworth, Sandy la Tourelle, Lisa Nolan, Christopher Phillips**; Kingdom of the Planet of the Apes: "Burning Village, Rapids and Floods" – Alex Nowotny, Claude Schitter, Frédéric Valleur, Kevin Kelm; Twisters – Matthew Hanger, Joakim Arnesson, Laurent Kermel, Zheng Yong Oh; Venom: The Last Dance: "Water, Fire & Symbiote Effects" – Xavi Martin Ramirez, Oscar Dahlen, Hedi Namar, Yuri Yang
Outstanding Effects Simulations in an Animated Feature	Outstanding Compositing and Lighting in a Feature
**The Wild Robot – Derek Cheung, Michael Losure, David Chow, Nyoung Kim**; Kung Fu Panda 4 – Jinguang Huang, Zhao Wang, Hamid Shahsavari, Joshua LaBrot; Moana 2 – Zoran Stojanoski, Jesse Erickson, Shamintha Kalamba Arachchi, Erin V. Ramos; Ultraman: Rising – Goncalo Cabaca, Zheng Yong Oh, Nicholas Yoon Joo Kuang, Praveen Boppana	**Dune: Part Two: "Wormriding, Geidi Prime, and the Final Battle" – Christopher Rickard, Francesco Dell'Anna, Paul Chapman, Ryan Wing**; Better Man – Mark McNicholl, Gordon Spencer de Haseth, Eva Snyder, Markus Reithoffer; Kingdom of the Planet of the Apes – Joerg Bruemmer, Zachary Brake, Tim Walker, Kaustubh A. Patil; The Wild Robot – Sondra L. Verlander, Baptiste Van Opstal, Eszter Offertaler, Austin Casale
Outstanding Virtual Cinematography in a CG Project	Outstanding Model in a Photoreal or Animated Project
**Dune: Part Two: "Arrakis" – Greig Fraser, Xin Steve Guo, Sandra Murta, Ben Wiggs**; Better Man – Blair Burke, Shweta Bhatnagar, Tim Walker, Craig Young; House of the Dragon: "The Red Dragon and the Gold" ("Battle at Rook's Rest") – Matt Perrin, James Thompson, Jacob Doehner, P.J. Dillon (HBO); Kingdom of the Planet of the Apes: "Egg Climb" – Dennis Yoo, Angelo Perrotta, Samantha Erickstad, Miae Kang	**Alien: Romulus: "Renaissance Space Station" – Waldemar Bartkowiak, Trevor Wide, Matt Middleton, Ben Shearman**; Deadpool & Wolverine: "Ant-Man Arena" – Carlos Flores Gomez, Corinne Dy, Chris Byrnes, Gerald Blaise; Dune: Part Two: "Harkonnen Harvester" – Andrew Hodgson, Timothy Russell, Erik Lehmann, Louie Cho; Gladiator II: "Colosseum" – Oliver Kane, Marnie Pitts, Charlotte Fargier, Laurie Priest
Outstanding Special (Practical) Effects in a Photoreal or Animated Project	Emerging Technology Award
**The Penguin: "Safe Guns" – Devin Maggio, Johnny Han, Cory Candrilli, Alexandre Prod'homme (HBO)**; Blitz – Hayley Williams, David Eves, Alex Freeman, David Watson; Constellation – Martin Goeres, Johara Raukamp, Lion David Bogus, Leon Mark (Apple TV+)	**Here: "Neural Performance Toolset" – Jo Plaete, Oriel Frigo, Tomas Koutsky, Matteo Oliviero Dancy**; Dune: Part Two: "Nuke CopyCat" – Ben Kent, Guillaume Gales, Mairead Grogan, Johanna Barbier; Furiosa: A Mad Max Saga: "Artist-driven Machine Learning Character" – John Bastian, Ben Ward, Thomas Rowntree, Robert Beveridge; Mufasa: The Lion King: "Real-Time Interactive Filmmaking, From Stage to Post" – Callum James, James Hood, Lloyd Bishop, Bruno Pedrinha; The Penguin: "Phase Synced Flash-Gun System" – Johnny Han, Jefferson Han, Joseph Menafra, Michael Pynn (HBO)

=== Television ===
Outstanding Visual Effects in a Photoreal Episode	Outstanding Supporting Visual Effects in a Photoreal Episode
**Shōgun: "Anjin" – Michael Cliett, Melody Mead, Philip Engström, Ed Bruce, Cameron Waldbauer (FX)**; Fallout: "The Head" – Jay Worth, Andrea Knoll, Grant Everett, Joao Sita, Devin Maggio (Prime Video); House of the Dragon: "The Red Dragon and the Gold" – Daði Einarsson, Tom Horton, Sven Martin, Wayne Stables, Mike Dawson (HBO); Star Wars: Skeleton Crew: "Episode 5" – John Knoll, Pablo Molles, Jhon Alvarado, Jeff Capogreco (Disney+); The Lord of the Rings: The Rings of Power: "Eldest" – Jason Smith, Tim Keene, Ann Podlozny, Ara Khanikian, Ryan Conder (Prime Video)	**The Penguin: "Bliss" – Johnny Han, Michelle Rose, Goran Pavles, Ed Bruce, Devin Maggio (HBO)**; Expats: "Home" – Robert Bock, Glorivette Somoza, Charles Labbé, Tim Emeis (Prime Video); Lady in the Lake: "It Has to Do With the Search for the Marvelous" – Jay Worth, Eddie Bonin, Joe Wehmeyer, Eric Levin-Hatz, Mike Myers (Apple TV+); Masters of the Air: "Part Three" – Stephen Rosenbaum, Bruce Franklin, Xavier Matia Bernasconi, David Andrews, Neil Corbould (Apple TV´+); The Tattooist of Auschwitz: "Pilot" – Simon Giles, Alan Church, David Schneider, James Hattsmith (Peacock)
Outstanding Visual Effects in a Commercial	Outstanding Animated Character in an Episode, Commercial, Game Cinematic, or Real-Time Project
**Coca-Cola: "The Heroes" – Greg McKneally, Antonia Vlasto, Ryan Knowles, Fabrice Fiteni**; YouTube TV NFL Sunday Ticket: "The Magic of Sunday" – Chris Bayol, Jeremy Brooks, Lane Jolly, Jacob Bergman; Disney Holidays 2024 – Adam Droy, Helen Tang, Christian Baker-Steele, David Fleet; Virgin Media: "Walrus Whizzer" – Sebastian Caldwell, Ian Berry, Ben Cronin, Alex Grey; Six Kings Slam: "Call of the Kings" – Ryan Knowles, Joe Billington, Dean Robinson, George Savvas	**Ronja, the Robber's Daughter: "Vildvittran the Queen Harpy" – Nicklas Andersson, David Allan, Gustav Åhren, Niklas Wallén (Netflix)**; Secret Level: "Armored Core: Asset Management" ("Mech Pilot") – Zsolt Vida, Péter Krucsai, Ágnes Vona, Enric Nebleza Pañella (Prime Video); Diablo IV: Vessel of Hatred: "Neyrelle" – Chris Bostjanick, James Ma, Yeon-Ho Lee, Atsushi Ikarashi; Disney Holidays 2024: "Octopus" – Alex Doyle, Philippe Moine, Lewis Pickston, Andrea Lacedelli
Outstanding Created Environment in an Episode, Commercial, Game Cinematic or Real-Time Project	Outstanding Effects Simulations in an Episode, Commercial, Game Cinematic or Real-Time Project
**Shōgun: "Osaka" – Manuel Martinez, Phil Hannigan, Keith Malone, Francesco Corvino (FX)**; Dune: Prophecy: "Pilot" ("Imperial Palace") – Scott Coates, Sam Besseau, Vincent l'Heureux, Lourenco Abreu; Dune: Prophecy: "Two Wolves" ("Zimia Spaceport") – Nils Weisbrod, David Anastacio, Rene Borst, Ruben Valente (HBO); The Lord of the Rings: The Rings of Power: "Doomed to Die" ("Eregion") – Yordan Petrov, Bertrand Cabrol, Lea Desrozier, Karan Dhandha (Prime Video)	**Shōgun: "Broken to the Fist" ("Landslide") – Dominic Tiedeken, Heinrich Löwe, Charles Guerton, Timmy Lundin (FX)**; Avatar: The Last Airbender: "Legends" ("Koizilla") – Ioan Boieriu, David Stopford, Per Balay, Saysana Rintharamy (Netflix); Star Wars: Skeleton Crew: "Pilot" ("Spaceship Hillside Takeoff") – Travis Harkleroad, Xiaolong Peng, Marcella Brown, Mickael Riciotti (Disney+); The Lord of the Rings: The Rings of Power: "Shadow and Flame" ("Balrog Fire and Collapsing Cliff") – Koenraad Hofmeester, Miguel Pérez Senent, Miguel Santana Da Silva, Billy Copley (Prime Video); 3 Body Problem: "Judgment Day" – Yves D'Incau, Gavin Templer, Martin Chabannes, Eloi Andaluz Fullà (Netflix)
Outstanding Compositing and Lighting in an Episode	Outstanding Compositing and Lighting in a Commercial
**The Penguin: "After Hours" – Jonas Stuckenbrock, Karen Chang, Eugene Bondar, Miky Girón (HBO)**; Shōgun: "Broken to the Fist" (Landslide) – Benjamin Bernon, Douglas Roshamn, Victor Kirsch, Charlie Raud (FX); Star Wars: Skeleton Crew: "Episode 6" ("Jaws") – Rich Grande, Tomas Lefebvre, Ian Dodman, Rey Reynolds (Disney+); The Boys: "Life Among the Septics" – Tristan Zerafa, Mike Stadnyckyj, Toshi Kosaka, Rajeev BR (Prime Video)	**Coca-Cola: "The Heroes" – Ryan Knowles, Alex Gabucci, Jack Powell, Dan Yarcigi**; Virgin Media: "Walrus Whizzer" – Sebastian Caldwell, Alex Grey, Kanishk Chouhan, Shubham Mehta; Corcept: "Marionette" – Yongchan Kim, Arman Matin, Yoon Bae, Rajesh Kaushik; Disney Holidays 2024 – Christian Baker-Steele, Luke Warpus, Pritesh Kotian, Jack Harris

=== Other categories ===
Outstanding Visual Effects in a Real-Time Project	Outstanding Visual Effects in a Special Venue Project
**Star Wars Outlaws – Stephen Hawes, Lionel Le Dain, Benedikt Podlesnigg, Bogdan Draghici**; [REDACTED] – Fabio Silva, Matthew Sherman, Caleb Essex, Bob Kopinsky; Destiny 2: The Final Shape – Dave Samuel, Ben Fabric, Eric Greenlief, Glenn Gamble; What If...? – An Immersive Story – Patrick N.P. Conran, Shereif Fattouh, Zain Homer, Jax Lee; Until Dawn – Nicholas Chambers, Jack Hidde Glavimans, Alex Gabor	**D23: "Real-Time Rocket" – Evan Goldberg, Alyssa Finley, Jason Breneman, Alice Taylor**; The Goldau Landslide Experience – Roman Kaelin, Gianluca Ravioli, Florian Baumann; MTV Video Music Awards: "Slim Shady Live" – Jo Plaete, Sara Mustafa, Cameron Jackson, Andries Courteaux; Tokyo DisneySea: "Peter Pan's Never Land Adventure" – Michael Sean Foley, Kirk Bodyfelt, Darin Hollings, Bert Klein, Maya Vyas; Paris Olympics Opening Ceremony: "Run" – Benjamin Le Ster, Gilles De Lusigman, Gerome Viavant, Romain Tinturier
Outstanding Visual Effects in a Student Project
**Pittura (ARTFX – Schools of Digital Arts) – Lauriol Adam, Lassère Titouan, Vivenza Rémi, Marre Helloïs**; Dawn (École Supérieure des Métiers Artistiques (ESMA)) – Noah Mercier, Apolline Royer, Lorys Stora, Marie Pradeilles; Student Accomplice (Brigham Young University) – Spencer Blanchard, Lisa Bird, Anson Savage, Kiara Spencer; Courage (Supinfocom – Rubika) – Salomé Cognon, Margot Jacquet, Nathan Baudry, Lise Delcroix
