= 21st Visual Effects Society Awards =

2023 visual effects awards ceremony for 2022 works

21st Visual Effects Society Awards

February 15, 2023

Outstanding Visual Effects in a Photoreal Feature: Avatar: The Way of Water

Outstanding Visual Effects in a Photoreal Episode: The Lord of the Rings: The Rings of Power - "Udûn"

The 21st Visual Effects Society Awards is an awards ceremony presented by the Visual Effects Society to recognize the best in visual effects in film, television and other media in 2022. Nominations were announced on January 17, 2023, and the ceremony took place on February 15, 2023. Avatar: The Way of Water received a record number of nominations with fourteen, surpassing the number of previous nominations for film (Avatar) and television (The Mandalorian). The society introduced a new "Emerging Technology Award" this year.

== Nominees ==
=== Honorary Awards ===
Lifetime Achievement Award:

- Gale Anne Hurd

VES Award for Creative Excellence

- Eric Roth

=== Film ===
| Outstanding Visual Effects in a Photoreal Feature | Outstanding Supporting Visual Effects in a Photoreal Feature |
|---|---|
| Avatar: The Way of Water – Richard Baneham, Walter Garcia, Joe Letteri, Eric Saindon, J. D. Schwalm: The Batman – Dan Lemmon, Bryan Searing, Russell Earl, Anders Langlands, Dominic Tuohy; Fantastic Beasts: The Secrets of Dumbledore – Christian Manz, Olly Young, Benjamin Loch, Stephane Naze, Alistair Williams; Jurassic World Dominion – David Vickery, Ann Podlozny, ance Rubinchik, Dan Snape, Paul Corbould; Top Gun: Maverick – Ryan Tudhope, Paul Molles, Seth Hill, Bryan Litson, Scott Fisher | Thirteen Lives – Jason Billington, Thomas Horton, Denis Baudin, Michael Harrison, Brian Cox: Death on the Nile – George Murphy, Claudia Dehmel, Mathieu Raynault, Jonathan Bowen, David Watkins; The Fabelmans – Pablo Helman, Jennifer Mizener, Cernogorods Aleksei, Jeff Kalmus, Mark Hawker; The Gray Man – Swen Gillberg, Viet Luu, Bryan Grill, Cliff Welsh, Michael Meinardus; The Pale Blue Eye – Jake Braver, Catherine Farrell, Tim Van Horn, Scott Pritchard, Jeremy Hays; Whitney Houston: I Wanna Dance with Somebody – Paul Norris, Tim Field, Don Libby, Andrew Simmonds |
| Outstanding Visual Effects in an Animated Feature | Outstanding Animated Character in a Photoreal Feature |
| Guillermo del Toro's Pinocchio – Aaron Weintraub, Jeffrey Schaper, Cameron Carson, Emma Gorbey: The Bad Guys – Pierre Perifel, Damon Ross, Matt Baer, JP Sans; Mad God – Chris Morley, Phil Tippett, Ken Rogerson, Tom Gibbons; The Sea Beast – Joshua Beveridge, Christian Hejnal, Stirling Duguid, Spencer Lueders; Strange World – Steve Goldberg, Laurie Au, Mark Hammel, Mehrdad Isvandi; Turning Red – Domee Shi, Lindsey Collins, Danielle Feinberg, Dave Hale | Avatar: The Way of Water: Kiri – Anneka Fris, Rebecca Louise Leybourne, Guillaume Francois, Jung-Rock Hwang: Beast: Lion – Alvise Avati, Bore Şahin, Chris McGaw, Krzysztof Boyoko; Disney's Pinocchio: Honest John – Christophe Paradis, Valentina Rosselli, Armita Khanlarpour, Kyoungmin Kim; Slumberland: Pig – Fernando Lopes Herrera, Victor Dinis, Martine Chartrand, Lucie Martinetto |
| Outstanding Animated Character in an Animated Feature | Outstanding Created Environment in a Photoreal Feature |
| Guillermo del Toro's Pinocchio: Pinocchio – Oliver Beale, Richard Pickersgill, Brian Leif Hansen, Kim Slate: Guillermo del Toro's Pinocchio: Geppetto – Charles Greenfield, Peter Saunders, Shani Lang-Rinderspacher, Noel Estevez-Baker; Strange World: Splat – Leticia Gillett, Cameron Black, Dan Lipson, Louis Jones; Turning Red: Panda Mei – Christopher Bolwyn, Ethan Dean, Bill Sheffler, Kureha Yokoo | Avatar: The Way of Water: The Reef – Jessica Cowley, Joe W. Churchill, Justin Stockton, Alex Nowotny: Avatar: The Way of Water: Metkayina Village – Ryan Arcus, Lisa Hardisty, Paul Harris, TaeHyoung David Kim; Jurassic World Dominion: Biosyn Valley – Steve Ellis, Steve Hardy, Thomas Dohlen, John Seru; Slumberland: The Wondrous Cuban Hotel Dream – Daniël Dimitri Veder, Marc Austin, Pavan Rajesh Uppu, Casey Gorton |
| Outstanding Created Environment in an Animated Feature | Outstanding Effects Simulations in a Photoreal Feature |
| Guillermo del Toro's Pinocchio: In the Stomach of a Sea Monster – Warren Lawtey, Anjum Sakharkar, Javier Gonzalez Alonso, Quinn Carvalho: Lightyear: T'Kani Prime Forest – Lenora Acidera, Amy Allen, Alyssa Minko, Jose L. Ramos Serrano; The Sea Beast: The Hunting Ship – Yohan Bang, Enoch Ihde, Denil George Chundangal, John Wallace; Strange World: The Windy Jungle – Ki Jong Hong, Ryan Smith, Jesse Erickson, Benjamin Fiske; Wendell & Wild: The Scream Fair – Tom Proost, Nicholas Blake, Colin Babcock, Matthew Paul Albertus Cross | Avatar: The Way of Water: Water Simulations – Jonathan M. Nixon, David Moraton, Nicolas Illingworth, David Caeiro Cebrian: Avatar: The Way of Water: Fire and Destruction – Miguel Perez Senent, Xaxier Martin Ramirez, David Kirchner, Ole Geir Eidsheim; Black Panther: Wakanda Forever: City Street Flooding – Matthew Hanger, Alexis Hall, Hang Yang, Mikel Zuloaga; Fantastic Beasts: The Secrets of Dumbledore – Jesse Parker Holmes, Grayden Solman, Toyokazu Hirai, Rob Richardson |
| Outstanding Effects Simulations in an Animated Feature | Outstanding Compositing and Lighting in a Feature |
| Puss in Boots: The Last Wish – Derek Cheung, Michael Losure, Kiem Ching Ong, Jinguang Huang: Lightyear – Alexis Angelidis, Chris Chapman, Jung-Hyun Kim, Keith Klohn; The Sea Beast – Spencer Lueders, Dmitriy Kolesnik, Brian D. Casper, Joe Eckroat; Strange World – Deborah Carlson, Scott Townsend, Stuart Griese, Yasser Hamed | Avatar: The Way of Water: Water Integration – Sam Cole, Francois Sugny, Florian Schroeder, Jean Matthews: Avatar: The Way of Water: Landing Rockets Forest Destruction – Miguel Santana Da Silva, Hongfei Geng, Jonathan Moulin, Maria Corcho; The Batman: Rainy Freeway Chase – Beck Veitch, Stephen Tong, Eva Snyder, Rachel E. Herbert; Top Gun: Maverick – Saul Davide Galbiati, Jean-Freceric Veilleux, Felix B. Lafontaine, Cynthia Rodriguez del Castillo |
| Outstanding Virtual Cinematography in a CG Project | Outstanding Model in a Photoreal or Animated Project |
| Avatar: The Way of Water – Richard Baneham, Dan Cox, Eric Reynolds, A.J Briones: ABBA Voyage – Pär M. Ekberg, John Galloway, Paolo Acri, Jose Burgos; The Batman: Rain Soaked Car Chase – Dennis Yoo, Michael J. Hall, Jason Desjarlais, Ben Bigiel; Prehistoric Planet – Daniel Fotheringham, Krzysztof Szczepanski, Wei-Chaun Hsu, Claire Hill | Avatar: The Way of Water: The Sea Dragon – Sam Sharplin, Stephan Skorepa, Ian Baker, Guillaume Francois: The Sea Beast – Maxx Okazaki, Susan Kornfeld, Edward Lee, Doug Smith; Top Gun: Maverick: F-14 Tomcat – Christian Peck, Klaudio Ladavac, Aram Jung, Peter Dominik; Wendell & Wild: Dream Faire – Peter Dahmen, Paul Harrod, Nicholas Blake |
Outstanding Special (Practical) Effects in a Photoreal or Animated Project
Avatar: The Way of Water: Current Machine and Wave Pool – J. D. Schwalm, Richie Schwalm, Nick Rand, Robert Spurlock: Black Adam: Robotic Flight – J. D. Schwalm, Nick Rand, Andrew Hyde, Andy Robot; The Lord of the Rings: The Rings of Power "Adrift" Middle Earth Storm – Dean Clarke, Oliver Gee, Eliot Naimie, Mark Robson; Mad God – Phil Tippett, Chris Morley, Webster Colcord, Johnny McLeod

=== Television ===
| Outstanding Visual Effects in a Photoreal Episode | Outstanding Supporting Visual Effects in a Photoreal Episode |
|---|---|
| The Lord of the Rings: The Rings of Power: "Udûn" – Jason Smith, Ron Ames, Nigel Sumner, Tom Proctor, Dean Clarke: The Boys: "Payback" – Stephan Fleet, Shalena Oxley-Butler, Tristan Zerafa, Anthony Paterson, Hudson Kenny; House of the Dragon: "The Black Queen" – Angus Bickerton, Nikeah Forde, Sven Martin, Michael Bell, Michael Dawson; Prehistoric Planet: "Ice Worlds" – Lindsay McFarlane, Fay Hancocks, Elliot Newman, Kristin Hall; Stranger Things 4: "The Piggyback" – Jabbar Raisani, Terron Pratt, Niklas Jacobson, Justin Mitchell, Richard E. Perry | Five Days at Memorial: "Day Two" – Eric Durst, Danny McNair, Matt Whelan, Goran Pavles, John MacGillivray: The Old Man: "Episode III" – Erik Henry, Matt Robken, Jamie Klein, Sylvain Théroux, J.D. Streett; See: "I See You" – Chris Wright, Parker Chehak, Tristan Zerafa, Oscar Perea, Tony Kenny; Severance: "Good News About Hell" – Vadim Turchin, Nicole Melius, David Piombino, David Rouxel; Vikings: Valhalla: "The Bridge" – Ben Mossman, Melanie Callaghan, Matt Schofield, Chris Cooper, Paul Byrne |
| Outstanding Visual Effects in a Commercial | Outstanding Animated Character in an Episode or Real-Time Project |
| Frito-Lay "Push It" – Tom Raynor, Sophie Harrison, Ben Cronin, Martino Madeddu: B&Q "Flip" – Patrick Krafft, Holly Treacy, Alex Snookes; Ladbrokes "Rocky" – Greg Spencer, Alex Fitzgerald, Mickey O'Donoghue, Adame Boutrif; Minions: The Rise of Gru – Gerome Viavant, Giles de Lusignan, Benjamin Le Ster; Virgin Media "Highland Rider" – Amir Bazzazi, George Reid, Sebastian Caldwell, Alex Kulikov | The Umbrella Academy: Pogo – Aidan Martin, Hannah Dockerty, Olivier Beierlein, Miae Kang: She-Hulk: Attorney at Law: She-Hulk – Elizabeth Bernard, Jan Philip Cramer, Edwina Ting, Andrew Park; Skull & Bones: Sam – Jonas Skoog, Jonas Törnqvist, Goran Milic, Jonas Vikström; The Callisto Protocol: Jacob Lee – Martin Contel, Glauco Longhi, Jorge Jimenez, Atsushi Seo |
| Outstanding Created Environment in an Episode, Commercial, or Real-Time Project | Outstanding Effects Simulations in an Episode, Commercial, or Real-Time Project |
| The Lord of the Rings: The Rings of Power: "Adar": Númenor City – Dan Wheaton, Nico Delbecq, Dan LeTarte, Julien Gauthier: Andor: "Reckoning": Ferrix – Pedro Santos, Chris Ford, Jeff Carson-Bartzis, Alex Murtaza; The Book of Boba Fett: "In the Name of Honor": Mos Espa – Daniel Schmid Leal, Phi Tran, Hasan Ilhan, Steve Wang; The Lord of the Rings: The Rings of Power: "Adrift": Khazud Dûm – James Ogle, Péter Bujdosó, Lon Krung, Shweta Bhatnagar | The Lord of the Rings: The Rings of Power: "Udûn" Water and Magma – Rick Hankins, Aron Bonar, Branko Grujcic, Laurent Kermel: Guillermo del Toro's Cabinet of Curiosities: "Graveyard Rats" – Amit Khanna, Oleg Memukhin, Mario Marengo, Josh George; Stranger Things 4: Hawkins Destructive Fissures – Ahmad Ghourab, Gavin Templer, Rachel Ajorque, Eri Ohno; The Lord of the Rings: The Rings of Power: "Udûn" Volcano Destruction – Kurt Debens, Hamish Bell, Robert Kelly, Gabriel Roccisano |
| Outstanding Compositing and Lighting in an Episode | Outstanding Compositing and Lighting in a Commercial |
| Love, Death and Robots: "Night of the Mini Dead" – Tim Emeis, José Maximiano, Renaud Tissandié, Nacere Guerouaf: House of the Dragon: "The Black Queen" Dance of Dragons – Kevin Friederichs, Sean Raffel, Florian Franke, Andreas Steinlein; The Book of Boba Fett: "From the Desert Comes a Stranger" – Peter Demarest, Tami Carter, Brandon McNaughton, Sirak Ghebremusse; The Lord of the Rings: The Rings of Power "Udûn" Tirharad Cavalry Charge – Sornalingam P, Ian Copeland, Nessa Mingfang Zhang, Yuvaraj S | Ladbrokes "Rocky" – Greg Spencer, Theajo Dharan, Georgina Ford, Jonathan Westley: Cartier "Tank" – Stephane Pivron, Mathias Barday, Valentin Lesueur, Eric Lemains; Samsung "Playtime is Over" – Danueb Canameras, Guillaume Dadaglio, Sébastien Podsiadlo, Christophe Plouvier; Samsung "The Spider and the Window" – Marta Carbonell Amela, Stefan Susemihl, Lonni Wong, Jiyoung Lee |

=== Other categories ===
| Outstanding Visual Effects in a Real-Time Project | Outstanding Visual Effects in a Special Venue Project |
|---|---|
| The Last of Us Part I – Erick Pangilinan, Evan Wells, Eben Cook, Mary Jane Whiting: God of War: Ragnarok – Christopher Lloyd, Carrie Watts, James Adkins, Kevin Huynh; Gotham Knights – Jay Evans, Bryan Theberge, Mathieu Houle, Alexandre Bélanger; Supermassive Games "The Quarry" – Aruna Inversin, Paul Pianezza, Kevin Williams, Kimberly Cheifer; The Callisto Protocol – Glen Schofield, Steve Papoutsis, Chris Stone, Demetrius Leal | ABBA Voyage – Ben Morris, Edward Randolph, Stephen Aplin, Ian Comley: Avengers: Quantum Encounter – Alan Woods, Bernice Howes, Scott Sohan, Jason Fox; Guardians of the Galaxy: Cosmic Rewind – Christopher Smith, Meghan Short, William George, Jon Alexander; Jumanji: The Adventure – Martin Cutbill, Liam Thompson, Baptiste Roy, Marco Parenzi; Star Wars: Galactic Starcruiser – Rob Blue, Patrick Kearney, Khatsho Orfali, Gabe Sabourin, Daniel Joseph; Stranger Things: The Experience – Javier Roca, Antoine Sitruk, Cale Jacox, Julien Forest, Camille Michaud |
| Outstanding Visual Effects in a Student Project | Emerging Technology Award |
| A Calling. From the Desert to the Sea – Mario Bertsch, Max Pollmann, Lukas Löffler, Till Sander-Titgemeyer: Boom – Roman Augier, Charles Di Cicco, Gabriel Augerai, Laurie Pereira De Figueiredo; Macula – Hady Abou Ghazale, Lothaire Rialhe, Marta Rodriguez-N Nava, Jules Machicot; Maronii – Maxime Guitet, Dimitri Allonneau, Lucas Plata, Ngoc Mai Nguyen | Avatar: The Way of Water: Water Toolset – Alexy Dmitrievich Stomakhin, Steve Lesser, Sven Joel Wretborn, Douglas McHale: Avatar: The Way of Water: Depth Comp – Dejan Momcilovic, Tobias B. Schmidt, Benny Edlund, Joshua Hardgrave; Avatar: The Way of Water: Facial System – Byungkuk Choi, Stephen Cullingford, Stuart Adcock, Marco Revelant; Guillermo del Toro's Pinocchio: 3D Printed Metal Armature – Richard Pickersgill, Glen Southern, Peter Saunders, Brian Leif Hansen; Turning Red: Profile Mover and CurveNets – Kurt Fleischer, Fernando de Goes, Bill Sheffler |
