= Visual Effects Society Award for Outstanding Created Environment in an Animated Feature =

Annual US film award

The Visual Effects Society Award for Outstanding Created Environment in an Animated Feature is one of the annual awards given by the Visual Effects Society starting from 2011. The award was originally titled "Outstanding Created Environment in an Animated Feature Motion Picture", before being re-titled in 2016.

== 2010s ==
Outstanding Created Environment in an Animated Feature Motion Picture

Year	Film	Environment	Nominee(s)
2011	Rango	Main Street Dirt	John Bell, Polly Ing, Martin Murphy, Russell Paul
2011	The Adventures of Tintin	Bagghar	Hamish Beachman, Adam King, Wayne Stables, Mark Tait
2011	The Adventures of Tintin	Docks	Matt Aitken, Jeff Capogreco, Jason Lazaroff, Alessandro Mozzato
2011	The Adventures of Tintin	Pirate Battle	Phil Barrenger, Keith F. Miller, Alessandro Saponi, Christoph Sprenger
2011	Puss in Boots	The Cloud World	Guillaume Aretos, Greg Lev, Brett Miller, Peter Zaslav
2012	Brave	The Forest	Tim Best, Steve Pilcher, Inigo Quilez, Andrew Whittock
2012	ParaNorman	Graveyard	Phil Brotherton, Robert Desue, Oliver Jones, Nick Mariana
2012	ParaNorman	Main Street	Alice Bird, Matt DeLeu, Caitlin Pashalek
2012	Rise of the Guardians	The North Pole	Eric Bouffard, Sonja Burchard, Andy Harbeck, Peter Maynez
2013	Frozen	Elsa's Ice Palace	Virgilio John Aquino, Alessandro Jacomini, Lance Summers, David Womersley
2013	The Croods	The Maze	Jonathan Harman, Violette Sacre-Shaik, Benjamin Venancie, Philippe Brochu
2013	Epic	Pod Patch	Aaron Ross, Travis Price, Jake Panian, Antelmo Villarreal
2013	Monsters University	Campus	Robert Kondo, Eric Andraos, Dale Ruffolo, Peter Sumanaseni
2014	Big Hero 6	Into the Portal	Ralf Habel, David Hutchins, Michael Kaschalk, Olun Riley
2014	The Book of Life	Magical Land of the Remembered	Glo Minaya, Amy Chen, Sean McEwan, Jeff Masters
2014	The Boxtrolls	Boxtroll Cavern	Curt Enderle, Rob DeSue, Emily Greene, Jesse Gregg
2014	How to Train Your Dragon 2	Oasis	Glo Minaya, Amy Chen, Sean McEwan, Jeff Masters

Outstanding Created Environment in an Animated Feature

Year	Film	Character	Nominee(s)
2015	The Good Dinosaur	The Farm	David Munier, Matthew Webb, Matt Kuruc, Tom Miller
2015	Inside Out	Imagination Land	Amy L. Allen, Steve Karski, Eric Andraos, Jose L. Ramos Serrano
2015	The Peanuts Movie	Charlie Brown's Neighborhood	Jon Townley, Angel Camacho-Torres, Cleveland Hibbert, Ken Lee
2015	Shaun the Sheep Movie	Under the Arches	Matt Perry, Charles Copping, Alfred Llupia Perez, Andy Brown
2016	Moana	Motonui Island	Rob Dressel, Andy Harkness, Brien Hindman, Larry Wu
2016	Finding Dory	Open Ocean Exhibit	Stephen Gustafson, Jack Hattori, Jesse Hollander, Michael Rutter
2016	Kubo and the Two Strings	Hanzo's Fortress	Phil Brotherton, Nick Mariana, Emily Greene, Joe Strasser
2016	Kubo and the Two Strings	Waves	David Horsley, Eric Wachtman, Daniel Leatherdale, Takashi Kuboto
2017	Coco	City of the Dead	Michael Frederickson, Jamie Hecker, Jonathan Pytko, Dave Strick
2017	Cars 3	Abandoned Racetrack	Marlena Fecho, Thidartana Annee Jonjai, Jose L. Ramos Serrano, Frank Tai
2017	Despicable Me 3	Hollywood Destruction	Axelle De Cooman, Pierre Lopes, Milo Riccarand, Nicolas Brack
2017	The Lego Ninjago Movie	Ninjago City	Kim Taylor, Angela Ensele, Felicity Coonan, Jean Pascal leBlanc
2018	Spider-Man: Into the Spider-Verse	Graphic New York City	Terry Park, Bret St. Clair, Kimberly Liptrap, Dave Morehead
2018	Dr. Seuss' The Grinch	Whoville	Loic Rastout, Ludovic Ramiere, Henri Deruer, Nicolas Brack
2018	Incredibles 2	Parr House	Christopher M. Burrows, Philip Metschan, Michael Rutter, Joshua West
2018	Ralph Breaks the Internet	Social Media District	Benjamin Min Huang, Jon Kim Krummel II, Gina Warr Lawes, Matthias Lechner
2019	Toy Story 4	Antiques Mall	Hosuk Chang, Andrew Finley, Alison Leaf, Philip Shoebottom for Antique Mall
2019	Frozen 2	Giants' Gorge	Samy Segura, Jay V. Jackson, Justin Cram, Scott Townsend
2019	How to Train Your Dragon: The Hidden World	The Hidden World	Chris Grun, Ronnie Cleland, Ariel Chisholm, Philippe Brochu
2019	Missing Link	Passage to India Jungle	Phil Brotherton, Oliver Jones, Nick Mariana, Ralph Procida

== 2020s ==
Year	Film	Environment	Nominee(s)
2020	Soul	You Seminar	Hosuk Chang, Sungyeon Joh, Peter Roe, Frank Tai
2020	Onward	Swamp Gas	Eric Andraos, Laura Grieve, Nick Pitera, Michael Rutter
2020	Trolls World Tour	Techno Reef	Luke Heathcock, Zachary Glynn, Marina Ilic, Michael Trull
2020	Trolls World Tour	Volcano Rock City	Brian LaFrance, Sara Cembalisty, Christopher Sprunger, Ruben Perez
2021	Encanto	Antonio's Room	Camille Andre, Andrew Finley, Chris Patrick O'Connell, Amol Sathe
2021	Luca	Portorosso Piazza	Airton Dittz, Jr., Jack Hattori, Michael Rutter, Joshua West
2021	Raya and the Last Dragon	Talon	Mingjue Helen Chen, Chaiwon Kim, Virgilio John Aquino, Diana Jiang LeVangie
2021	Sing 2	Crystal Theater	Ludovic Ramière, Théo Rivoalen, Henri Deruer, Frédéric Mainil
2021	Vivo	Mambo Cabana	Bertrand Bry-Marfaing, Josef Dylan Swift, Geeta Basantani, Jeremy Kim
2022	Guillermo del Toro's Pinocchio	In the Stomach of a Sea Monster	Warren Lawtey, Anjum Sakharkar, Javier Gonzalez Alonso, Quinn Carvalho
2022	Lightyear	T'Kani Prime Forest	Lenora Acidera, Amy Allen, Alyssa Minko, Jose L. Ramos Serrano
2022	The Sea Beast	The Hunting Ship	Yohan Bang, Enoch Ihde, Denil George Chundangal, John Wallace
2022	Strange World	The Windy Jungle	Ki Jong Hong, Ryan Smith, Jesse Erickson, Benjamin Fiske
2022	Wendell & Wild	The Scream Fair	Tom Proost, Nicholas Blake, Colin Babcock, Matthew Paul Albertus Cross
2023	Spider-Man: Across the Spider-Verse	Mumbattan City	Taehyun Park, YJ Lee, Pepe Orozco, Kelly Han
2023	Chicken Run: Dawn of the Nugget	Chicken Island	Charles Copping, Matthew Perry, Jim Lewis, Jon Biggins
2023	Elemental	Element City	Chris Bernardi, Brandon Montell, David Shavers, Ting Zhang
2023	Teenage Mutant Ninja Turtles: Mutant Mayhem	Midtown Manhattan	Olivier Mitonneau, Eddy Frechou, Guillaume Chevet, Arnaud Philippe-Giraux
2024	The Wild Robot	The Forest	John Wake, He Jung Park, Woojin Choi, Shane Glading
2024	Kung Fu Panda 4	Juniper City	Benjamin Lippert, Ryan Prestridge, Sarah Vawter, Peter Maynez
2024	Transformers One	Iacon City	Alex Popescu, Geoffrey Lebreton, Ryan Kirby, Hussein Nabeel
2024	Wallace & Gromit: Vengeance Most Fowl	Aqueduct	Matt Perry, Dave Alex Riddett, Matt Sanders, Howard Jones
2025	Zootopia 2	Marsh Market	Limei Z. Hshieh, Alexander Nicholas Whang, Joshua Fry, Ryan DeYoung
2025	Elio	The Communiverse	Steve Arguello, Christopher M. Burrows, Andy Lin, Laura Murphy
2025	KPop Demon Hunters	Seoul	Rafael Lescano, Gunsik Kim, Tyquane Wright, Hee-Chel Nam
2025	The Bad Guys 2	Cairo City	John J. Lee, Greg Hettinger, Mikael Genachte-Le Bail, Mayumi Shimokawa

== Films with Multiple Nominations ==
3 Nominations

- The Adventures of Tintin

2 Nominations

- Kubo and the Two Strings
- ParaNorman
- Trolls World Tour
