= Strange World (film) =

2022 American animated film

- Theatrical release poster
- Directed by: Don Hall
- Screenplay by: Qui Nguyen
- Produced by: Roy Conli
- Starring: Jake Gyllenhaal; Dennis Quaid; Jaboukie Young-White; Gabrielle Union; Lucy Liu
- Cinematography: Tracy Scott Beattie (layout); Brian Leach (lighting)
- Edited by: Sarah K. Reimers
- Music by: Henry Jackman
- Production company: Walt Disney Animation Studios
- Distributed by: Walt Disney Studios; Motion Pictures (Note: Distributed under the Walt Disney Pictures banner.)
- Release dates: November 15, 2022 (El Capitan Theatre); November 23, 2022 (United States)
- Running time: 102 minutes
- Country: United States
- Language: English
- Budget: $135–180 million (Note: Deadline Hollywood reported the film's budget to be $135 million, while Variety reported the budget to be $180 million.)
- Box office: $74.7 million

Strange World is a 2022 American animated adventure film produced by Walt Disney Animation Studios. The film follows a legendary family of explorers who must set aside their differences as they embark on a journey to a mysterious subterranean land inhabited by surreal lifeforms, in order to save the miracle plant Pando, which is their society's source of energy. The film was directed by Don Hall and written by Qui Nguyen, and stars the voices of Jake Gyllenhaal, Dennis Quaid, Jaboukie Young-White, Gabrielle Union, and Lucy Liu.

Hall first conceived Strange World in 2017. It drew inspiration from pulp magazines, Journey to the Center of the Earth (1864), Fantastic Voyage (1966), Jurassic Park (1993) and King Kong (1933). To communicate non-verbally, several animators worked to create the movement of the character Splat. While the film is predominantly CGI, the film incorporates 2D animation from Randy Haycock, with additional 2D animation by Eric Goldberg and Mark Henn in certain scenes. Henry Jackman provided the musical score. The film introduced Disney's first openly LGBTQ lead character, leading to the film being pulled from theatrical release in some regions.

Strange World premiered at the El Capitan Theatre in Hollywood, Los Angeles, on November 15, 2022, and was released in the United States on November 23, by Walt Disney Pictures through Walt Disney Studios Motion Pictures. It received generally positive reviews from critics, but was a box-office bomb, grossing $75 million, with a projected loss of $197 million for Disney. After its release on Disney+, it was the most-watched film during its first weeks on the platform.

== Plot ==
In the land of Avalonia, which is surrounded by an endless wall of mountains, Jaeger Clade and his son, Searcher brave the wilderness to explore new worlds. While trying to traverse the mountains to find a way across it, Searcher discovers a green plant that gives off energy. He and the rest of the expedition team decide to return to Avalonia with the plant while Jaeger angrily continues his mission alone.

25 years later, Searcher has made a name for himself by introducing the miracle plant, dubbed Pando, as a fuel source for Avalonia. He and his wife Meridian are Pando farmers while their son Ethan has a crush on his friend Diazo and chafes at his father's expectation of becoming a farmer like him. One night, Callisto Mal, the president of Avalonia and one of Jeager's former expedition teammates, shows up in her airship, the Venture, to inform the Clades that Pando is losing its power and asks Searcher to help find the cause. He joins an expedition to travel into a giant sinkhole in which the roots of Pando have been located.

On the way down, Meridian tries catching up in her crop-duster when Ethan and their three-legged dog Legend stows away on the Venture. While being attacked by red wyvern-like creatures, the Venture crash-lands in a subterranean world, where Searcher and Legend are separated from the group. They are attacked by a creature called a "Reaper," but are rescued by Jaeger who has been living underground all these years. He has been trying to cross the mountains from below, but is blocked by an acidic ocean and states his intention to board the Venture to attempt to cross it.

Meanwhile, Ethan sneaks away from the Venture to find Searcher. He befriends an amorphous blue creature, naming it Splat, before being reunited with Searcher, Legend, and Jaeger. They are attacked by more Reapers, but are rescued by Meridian and President Callisto and return to the Venture. Searcher insists on completing their mission, while Jaeger wants to continue journeying across the Strange World. Ethan becomes frustrated with them and their opposing worldviews. After another wild encounter, Searcher and Jaeger finally have a heart-to-heart talk and realize that they do respect each other's goals in life. They eventually find a cluster of Pando's roots, which is being attacked by the Strange World's creatures. When Searcher learns that Ethan wants to explore more of the Strange World, he blames Jaeger's influence on him. Ethan angrily jumps off the Venture and on to one of the Reapers, while Searcher follows him aboard a small flying vehicle. In a heated argument, Ethan reveals he does not want to be a farmer. As a remorseful Searcher is apologizing, they realize that they have passed through the mountains to the ocean beyond where they see the eye of a giant turtle-like creature. The two realize that Avalonia is on the creature's back and that they have been traveling through its body, meaning that the Reapers and all the other creatures are its immune system.

Seeing that Pando is an infection attacking the creature's heart, they head back to inform the expedition team that Pando must be destroyed, but President Callisto has them locked up to prevent them from stopping the mission while Jaeger furiously sails off to see for himself. After Legend and Splat free the family, Searcher and Ethan head to the creature's heart to clear a path for the Reapers, while Meridian takes over the ship and convinces President Callisto to help. Just as Jaegar is about to leave, he decides to return, and with his help, they break through Pando and the creatures appear and destroy it, bringing the heart back to life and saving the land. Searcher decides to make one last stop in front of the creature's eyes for his father.

One year later, Ethan and Diazo are in a relationship as they collect resources from the underground with their friends, and Avalonia shifts from Pando energy to wind turbines. Jaeger visits his ex-wife Penelope, who has remarried during his absence, while his relationship with Searcher improves as they run the farm. The camera zooms away from Avalonia to show the giant turtle-like creature on an ocean-covered planet.

== Voice cast ==
- Jake Gyllenhaal as Searcher Clade, a 40-year-old man who is Jaeger's son, Meridian's husband, and Ethan's father as well as a farmer of the Pando power source.
- Dennis Quaid as Jaeger Clade, Searcher's father and Ethan's grandfather who is more of a larger-than-life explorer.
- Jaboukie Young-White as Ethan Clade, Searcher's 17-year-old son and Jeager's grandson who longs for adventure beyond his father's farm while also navigating a school crush on Diazo. Ethan is Walt Disney Animation Studios' first openly gay main character.
- Gabrielle Union as Meridian Clade, Ethan's mother, and Searcher's wife who is a pilot and natural leader in the Venture.
- Lucy Liu as Callisto Mal, the President of Avalonia and leader of the exploration into the strange world who helps the Clades to lead the adventures in her airship called the Venture.
- Karan Soni as Caspian, a nerdy member of the expedition to Strange World.
- Alan Tudyk as:
  - Duffle, a pilot for the expedition to the strange world in the Venture who is killed by red wyvern-like creatures. His role is a reference to Tudyk's Firefly character Hoban "Wash" Washburn.
  - The Newsreel Narrator at the beginning of the film.
  - Radio Host #1
- Adelina Anthony as Captain Pulk, the second-in-command of the expedition to strange world.
- Abraham Benrubi as Lonnie Redshirt, a member of Jaeger's expedition crew before he disappeared. His last name refers to the trend in Star Trek for those wearing red shirts to die insignificantly.
- Jonathan Melo as Diazo, Ethan's love interest and later boyfriend.
- Nik Dodani as Kardez, one of Ethan's friends.
- Francesca Reale as Azimuth, one of Ethan's friends.
- Emily Kuroda as Ro
- Reed Buck as Rory
- Katie Lowes as Radio Host #2
- LaNisa Frederick as Client #2
- Dave Kohut as Client #3
- Alice Kina Diehl as Client #4

Additional voice cast for Strange World include Terri Douglas, Liza Del Mundo, Shondalia White, Melanie Minichino, Michael Ralph, Shane Sweet, Arthur Ortiz, and Matt Yang King.

Non-speaking roles in the film include Legend, the Clades' three-legged Bernedoodle dog; Splat, the blue creature from the Strange World; the other Avalonia creatures; and Penelope Clade, Jaeger's ex-wife and Searcher's mother who retired from adventuring and remarried to a man named Sheldon. In the end credits, Legend and Splat are listed as playing "themselves".

== Production ==
=== Development ===
Development on Strange World began in 2017, after Don Hall finished co-directing Moana (2016). His frequent creative partner Chris Williams was also involved in the project before leaving Disney in November 2018 to direct the Netflix Animation film The Sea Beast (2022). Hall pondered the origins of a generational family with the concept of "environmental overtones", which was described as "Indiana Jones meets National Lampoon's Vacation". Shortly after the announcement of Raya and the Last Dragon (2021) at the D23 Expo in August 2019, a major rework happened, with the creative leadership on the film were being swapped, while some cast members were replaced. Hall reteams with Qui Nguyen, who serves as co-director and writer. During a story meeting, Disney artist Burny Mattinson suggested adding a dog character for the Clades, which ultimately became the character Legend in the final film. Overall, the budget of Strange World was approximately between $135–180 million.

=== Writing ===
Nguyen adds that filmmakers wanted to make sure that, at the end of the film, viewers "could go backward and — like watching The Sixth Sense — be able to track all those moments and go, 'They told us all along what this was, and only now have we realized we got that last puzzle piece.'"

=== Casting ===
On June 6, 2022, following the release of the teaser trailer, Jake Gyllenhaal was announced as the voice of Searcher Clade. Eleven days later, the rest of the main cast for the film was announced at France's Annecy Animation Festival, including Jaboukie Young-White as Ethan Clade, Gabrielle Union as Meridian Clade, Lucy Liu as Callisto Mal, and Dennis Quaid as Jaeger Clade. The inclusion of Young-White voicing a gay character named Ethan marks Walt Disney Animation Studios' first openly LGBTQ main character.

=== Animation, design, and influences ===
According to Hall, Strange World takes heavy influence from pulp magazines—popular fiction from the first half of the 20th century that was printed on inexpensive wood pulp papers, in addition to science fiction works such as Journey to the Center of the Earth, Fantastic Voyage and King Kong. He also said "[he] loved reading the old issues of pulps growing up. They were big adventures in which a group of explorers might discover a hidden world or ancient creatures. They've been a huge inspiration for Strange World."

The miracle plant Pando is named after a forest in Utah in America. The land of Avalonia was given a "warm, nostalgic" color scheme to contrast with the titular strange world inside the creature, for which the filmmakers "avoided earth tones and leaned into reds and magentas." They also created a way for the character Splat to communicate non-verbally, similar to the magic carpet in Aladdin.

The production team for the film conducted research on climatologists, paleontologists and biologists, as well as a farmer, while filmmakers visited National Geographic for research, which is reflected not just in the film's setting, but in its inhabitants.

The land of Avalonia is named after the island of Avalon of Arthurian legend and presented as a utopic community.

== Music ==
Henry Jackman was announced to compose the score for the film on September 5, 2022, marking his third collaboration with Don Hall, after Winnie the Pooh and Big Hero 6, and his fifth overall feature-length scoring work with Walt Disney Animation Studios, which includes the Wreck-It Ralph films. Walt Disney Records released the score album on November 23, 2022, in addition to the song "They're The Clades!" performed by James Hayden, also having a reprised version of the tracks, the same day as the theatrical release.

== Release ==
=== Marketing ===
Following the project announcement, the first look concept art of the film was released on December 9, 2021. Max Évry of /Film said the image "[looked] a lot like Avatar, or at the very least the Pandora section of Disney World's Animal Kingdom." The marketing campaign for Strange World began on June 6, 2022, with the release of a teaser trailer. Petrana Radulovic for Polygon felt it was "an homage to retro sci-fi flicks" and similar to Raya and the Last Dragon, it "definitely seems to lean more into the action than Disney's typical musical fantasies." A new trailer was shown at the 2022 D23 Expo and the official trailer was released on September 21, 2022, followed by a cast reaction video a day later. Lex Briscuso of /Film says it "honestly looks like a breath of fresh air when it comes to animated family stories." A "special look" trailer was released on October 19, 2022. Rafael Motamayor of /Film said "Though the upbeat song and the focus on laughs kind of sells this as a more formulaic Disney film in terms of tone, the prominent use of monsters and big action hopefully makes this more of an inventive film from the studio." Two featurettes "Welcome to Strange World" and "100 Years of Amazing Characters", which showcased the characters of Splat and Legend, were released on November 3, 2022, and November 8, 2022, respectively.

=== Theatrical ===
Strange World premiered at the El Capitan Theatre in Hollywood, Los Angeles, on November 15, 2022, and was theatrically released in the United States on November 23, 2022.

Strange World was not released theatrically in some regions. Due to Disney's opposition to French regulations regarding theatrical windows, the company announced that Strange World would not see a theatrical release in France, and would instead go straight to Disney+. A Russian release was pulled due to the ongoing invasion of Ukraine. The film was not released theatrically in many other countries in the Middle East, Africa, and Asia to avoid the likely censorship of the gay characters.

This was the first film to feature the commemorative 100th anniversary Disney logo in celebration of the company's centennial in 2023, created by Disney Studios Content and Industrial Light & Magic, which was revealed at the 2022 D23 Expo. Christophe Beck composed a new arrangement of "When You Wish Upon a Star", while Tim Davies conducted it.

=== Home media ===
Strange World was made available for streaming on Disney+ on December 23, 2022. The film was released on Ultra HD Blu-ray, Blu-ray, and DVD by Walt Disney Studios Home Entertainment on February 14, 2023.

Streaming analytics firm FlixPatrol, which monitors daily updated VOD charts and streaming ratings across the globe, announced that Strange World was the most-streamed film on Disney+ upon its release on the platform. The film ranked among the ten most-streamed films on the streaming service through December 2022, according to FlixPatrol.

Nielsen Media Research, which records streaming viewership on U.S. television screens, reported that Strange World was the eighth most-streamed film between December 19–25, 2022, with 527 million minutes viewed. The following week, from December 26 to January 1, the film placed third with 753 million minutes of watch time. Between January 2–8, 2023, Strange World ranked fifth with 433 million minutes viewed. From January 9–15, the film placed ninth with 200 million minutes of watch time.

On Vudu, Strange World was the sixth most-popular film on Fandango's transactional digital service during the week ending January 1, 2023. On physical media, it was the fourth best-selling film for the week ending February 18, according to Circana's VideoScan tracking service, which compiles DVD and Blu-ray sales. Blu-ray formats accounted for 52% of its unit sales, with 38% from regular Blu-ray and 14% from the 4K combo pack.

== Reception ==
=== Box office ===
Strange World grossed $39.1 million in the United States and Canada, and $35.7 million in other territories, for a worldwide total of $74.7 million. Variety and Deadline Hollywood estimated the film would lose the studio $100–197 million, which makes it one of the biggest box-office bombs of all time.

In the United States and Canada, Strange World was released alongside Glass Onion: A Knives Out Mystery and Devotion, as well as the wide expansions of The Fabelmans and Bones and All, and was initially projected to gross $30–40 million from 4,174 theaters over its five-day opening weekend. The film made $4.2 million on its first day (including $800,000 from Tuesday night previews), which led to less optimism about it meeting initial box office projections and could debut to as low as $23 million. The film ended up debuting even lower than initial re-adjustments, making $11.9 million in its opening weekend (a five-day total of $18.6 million). Overall, it ranked in second place at the box office behind Disney's own Black Panther: Wakanda Forever. Several publications labeled the film a box office bomb, with The Hollywood Reporter saying was "the worst opening for a Disney Animation Thanksgiving title in modern times" and Variety calling it a "catastrophic result for Disney". The low box-office opening was attributed to negative word-of-mouth, large budget overall, the lack of movie theater attendance, the expectation of its streaming release on Disney+ as the result of COVID-19 pandemic, rocky company politics, conservative backlash over inclusion of gay characters, critical reviews, a vague and unremarkable premise, and lackluster marketing compared to other Disney animated films. (Note: Attributed to multiple references.) Some analysts believe that then-Disney CEO Bob Chapek's decision to send Pixar's recent animated movies, Soul, Luca and Turning Red, straight to Disney+ so that Disney could focus on building its streaming service caused consumer confusion for families. When Bob Iger returned as Disney CEO prior its release, the distribution division—which was formerly led by Kareem Daniel—was quickly dismantled. Strange World completed its theatrical run in the United States and Canada on February 2, 2023.

=== Critical response ===
On the review aggregator website Rotten Tomatoes, 72% of 169 critics' reviews are positive, with an average rating of 6.3/10. The website's consensus reads: "Strange World is a Disney milestone in terms of representation – but as a storytelling experience, this dazzlingly animated adventure offers little audiences haven't already seen." Metacritic, which uses a weighted average, assigned the film a score of 65 out of 100, based on 35 critics, indicating "generally favorable" reviews. Audiences polled by CinemaScore gave the film an average grade of "B" on an A+ to F scale, while those at PostTrak gave it an overall positive score of 82%, including an average four out of five stars. Strange World was the first film from Walt Disney Animation to earn lower than "A–" and is considered the lowest CinemaScore rating of all Disney animated films since 1991.

Peter Debruge of Variety wrote "it's the characters as much as the environment that make this vibrant, Journey to the Center of the Earth-style adventure movie colorful and diverse in all the best ways. Great as the people and places they explore may be, however, the relatively unimaginative story consigns this gorgeous toon to second-tier status ... instead of cracking the pantheon of Disney classics." Lovia Gyarke of The Hollywood Reporter praised the visuals, writing it was "meticulously and wondrously rendered by the Strange World animators, who drew much of their inspiration from pulp magazines of the 30s and 40s. There's a painterly feel to the landscape, which, combined with the film's sci-fi bent, might trigger memories of Disney's Treasure Planet." Tracy Brown of the Los Angeles Times also praised the visuals as "vibrant, weird, visually stunning... From its lush palette to its cute and deadly flora and fauna, this strange, mysterious world is very much deserving of its status as the film's title character."

Richard Roeper of the Chicago Sun-Times wrote while the film is not in the same category as "Frozen, Zootopia and Encanto, it's a family-friendly fun fest with the expected ingredients of fast-paced action, ingenious visuals, terrific voice performances and, yes, some heaping spoonfuls of upbeat messaging about family ties, the importance of being true to oneself and how we should all take great measures to take care of not only each other but the world in which we live, no matter how STRANGE that world might be." Brian Truitt of USA Today gave the film three stars out of four, stating Strange World is "an enjoyable piece of vibrant world building that steps away from the musical bent of recent non-Pixar efforts like Encanto and the Frozen flicks." Odie Henderson of The Boston Globe praised the film's environmental and father-son messages, as well as the "excellent voice-over work plus the score by Henry Jackman make the preachiness palatable and the film fun. The look of Avalonia's underworld is a lovely distraction; its garish and bright pinks, reds, and greens look lifted from the colored roofs of a suburban New Jersey neighborhood in the 1970s."

For The Washington Post, Kristen Page-Kirby found "the story is too basic and the characters too slight for Strange World to pack a punch. The visual beauty of the film isn't enough. After all, pretty is as pretty does — and in Strange World, pretty doesn't do much." Jacob Stoller of Paste Magazine admitted that while the film "can be arresting—especially with its inventive setting and bulbous creatures—and its attempts at deconstructing the sweaty, macho-man ethos hawked by its inspiration are admirable. But with muddled themes and slight characters, remnants of the old dime magazines coordinate to bring Strange World down on the wrong side of familiar." Cath Clarke of The Guardian felt the characters "aren't half-bad", but the "clunky script feels like it's been re-drafted and re-drafted to the point of incomprehension – blowing any chance of conveying a message. However well-meaning, it makes for a surprisingly dull watch."

=== Accolades ===
Accolades received by Strange World (film)
Award	Date of ceremony	Category	Recipient(s)	Result	Ref.
Annie Awards	February 25, 2023	Outstanding Achievement for Storyboarding in a Feature Production	Jeff Snow	Nominated	
Annie Awards	February 25, 2023	Outstanding Achievement for Storyboarding in a Feature Production	Javier Ledesma Barbolla	Nominated	
Black Reel Awards	February 6, 2023	Outstanding Voice Performance	Gabrielle Union	Nominated	
GLAAD Media Awards	March 30, 2023	Outstanding Film – Wide Release	Strange World	Nominated	
International Film Music Critics Association Awards	February 23, 2023	Best Original Score for an Animated Film	Henry Jackman	Nominated	
Visual Effects Society Awards	February 15, 2023	Outstanding Visual Effects in an Animated Feature	Steve Goldberg, Laurie Au, Mark Hammel, and Mehrdad Isvandi	Nominated	
Visual Effects Society Awards	February 15, 2023	Outstanding Animated Character in an Animated Feature	Leticia Gillett, Cameron Black, Dan Lipson, and Louis Jones for "Splat"	Nominated	
Visual Effects Society Awards	February 15, 2023	Outstanding Created Environment in an Animated Feature	Ki Jong Hong, Ryan Smith, Jesse Erickson, and Benjamin Fiske for "The Windy Jungle"	Nominated	
Visual Effects Society Awards	February 15, 2023	Outstanding Effects Simulations in an Animated Feature	Deborah Carlson, Scott Townsend, Stuart Griese, and Yasser Hamed	Nominated	
