= 19th Visual Effects Society Awards =

2021 awards ceremony for 2020 works

19th Visual Effects Society Awards

April 6, 2021

Outstanding Visual Effects in a Photoreal Feature:
The Midnight Sky

Outstanding Visual Effects in a Photoreal Episode:
The Mandalorian – "Chapter 9: The Marshal"

The 19th Visual Effects Society Awards was an awards ceremony held by the Visual Effects Society. Nominations were announced on March 1, 2021, and the ceremony took place on April 6, 2021.

== Nominees ==
=== Honorary Awards ===
Lifetime Achievement Award:

- Peter Jackson

VES Award for Creative Excellence

- Robert Legato

=== Film ===
Outstanding Visual Effects in a Photoreal Feature	Outstanding Supporting Visual Effects in a Photoreal Feature
The Midnight Sky – Matt Kasmir, Greg Baxter, Chris Lawrence, Max Solomon, David Watkins: Jingle Jangle: A Christmas Journey – Brad Parker, Roma Van Den Bergh, Eric Guaglione, Carlos Monzon, Stefano Pepin; Project Power – Ivan Moran, Leslie Hough, Joao Sita, Matthew Twyford, Yves Debono; Tenet – Andrew Jackson, Mike Chambers, Andrew Lockley, David Lee, Scott Fisher; The Witches – Kevin Baillie, Sandra Scott, Sean Konrad, Glenn Melenhorst, Mark Holt	Mank – Wei Zheng, Peter Mavromates, Simon Carr, James Pastorius: Da 5 Bloods – Randall Balsmeyer, James Cooper, Watcharachai "Sam" Panichsuk; Extraction – Marko Forker, Lynzi Grant, Craig Wentworth, Olivier Sarda; News of the World – Roni Rodrigues, Dayaliyah Lopez, Ian Fellows, Andrew Morley, Brandon K. McLaughlin; Welcome to Chechnya – Ryan Laney, Eugen Bräunig, Maxwell Anderson, Johnny Han, Piers Dennis
Outstanding Visual Effects in an Animated Feature	Outstanding Animated Character in a Photoreal Feature
Soul – Pete Docter, Dana Murray, Michael Fong, Bill Watral: Onward – Dan Scanlon, Kori Rae, Sanjay Bakshi, Vincent Serritella; Over the Moon – Glen Keane, Gennie Rim, Céline Desrumaux, David Alexander Smith; The Croods: A New Age – Joel Crawford, Mark Swift, Betsyf Nofsinger, Jakob Hjort Jensen; Trolls World Tour – Walt Dohrn, Gina Shay, Kendal Cronkhite-Shaindlin, Matt Baer	The One and Only Ivan – Ivan – Valentina Rosselli, Thomas Huizer, Andrea De Martis, William Bell: The Kangaroo Chronicles – Kangaroo – Claudius Urban, Sebastian Badea, Dorian Knapp, Ruth Wiegand; Jingle Jangle: A Christmas Journey – Don Juan Diego – Eric Guaglione, Shuchi Singhal, Adrien Annesley, Mahmoud Ellithy; The Witches – Daisy – Jye Skinn, Sarah Fuller, Marco Iannaccone, Fredrik Sundqvist
Outstanding Animated Character in an Animated Feature	Outstanding Created Environment in a Photoreal Feature
Soul – Terry – Jonathan Hoffman, Jonathan Page, Peter Tieryas, Ron Zorman: Onward – Dad Pants – Kristopher Campbell, Jonas Jarvers, Rob Jensen, Jacob Kuenzel; Over the Moon – Chang'e – Siggi Orri Thorhannesson, Hyesok Kim, Javier Solsona, Alan Chen; The SpongeBob Movie: Sponge on the Run – SpongeBob – Jacques Daigle, Guillaume Dufief, Adrien Montero, Liam Hill	Mulan – Imperial City – Jeremy Fort, Matt Fitzgerald, Ben Walker, Adrian Vercoe: Bloodshot – Neuralspace – Arbanud Brisebois, Patrick Bacon, Dawid Borkiewicz, Gérôme Viavant; The Eight Hundred – 1937 Shanghai Downtown – Sefano Cieri, Aaron Auty, Simon Carlile, Patrick Zentis; The Eight Hundred – Shanghai Warehouse District – Jamie Macdougall, Mark Honer, David Pekarek
Outstanding Created Environment in an Animated Feature	Outstanding Virtual Cinematography in a CG Project
Soul – You Seminar – Hosuk Chang, Sungyeon Joh, Peter Roe, Frank Tai: Onward – Swamp Gas – Eric Andraos, Laura Grieve, Nick Pitera, Michael Rutter; Trolls World Tour – Techno Reef – Luke Heathcock, Zachary Glynn, Marina Ilic, Michael Trull; Trolls World Tour – Volcano Rock City – Brian LaFrance, Sara Cembalisty, Christopher Sprunger, Ruben Perez	Soul – Matt Aspbury, Ian Megibben: Ghost of Tsushima – A Storm is Coming – Aladino Debert, Matt Dougan, Eric Beaver, David Liu; The Mandalorian – "Chapter 15: The Believer" – Richard Bluff, Matt Jensen, Chris Williams, Landis Fields IV; The Mandalorian – "Chapter 12: The Siege" – Dave Crispino, Kyle Winkelman, Paul Kavanagh, Jose Burgos
Outstanding Model in a Photoreal or Animated Project	Outstanding Effects Simulations in a Photoreal Feature
The Midnight Sky – Aether – Michael Balthazart, Jonathan Opgenhaffen, John-Peter Li, Simon Aluze: The Mandalorian – Boba Fett's Ship – Jay Machado, Enrico Damm, Gerald Blaise, Ryan Church; The Mandalorian – "Chapter 16: The Rescue"; Light Cruiser – John Knoll, John Goodson, Dan Patrascu, Rene Garcia; The Witches – Rollercoaster – Jared Michael, Peter Dominik, Sylvain Lesaint, Emily Tilson	Project Power – Yin Lai Jimmy Leung, Jonathan Edward Lyddon-Towl, Pierpaolo Navarini, Michelle Lee: Bloodshot – Omar Meradi, Jeremy Poupin, Sylvain Robert, Deak Ferrand; Greyhound – Mike Nixon, Nicholas Papworth, Jeremy Smith, Yashdeep Sawant; Monster Hunter – Vimal Mallireddy, Warren Lawtey, Tom O’Bready, Dominik Haase; Mulan – Theo Vandernoot, Sandra Balej, James Carson, Yuri Rudakov
Outstanding Effects Simulations in an Animated Feature	Outstanding Compositing in a Photoreal Feature
Soul – Alexis Angelidis, Keith Daniel Klohn, Aimei Kutt, Melissa Tseng: Onward – Dave Hale, Jonah Blue Laird, Stephen Marshall, Ricardo Nadu; Over the Moon – Ian Farnsworth, Brian Casper, Reinhold Rittinger, Jennifer Lasrado; Trolls World Tour – Stephen Wood, Carl Hooper, Spencer Knapp, Nick Augello; The Willoughbys – Helén Ahlberg, Kyle McQueen, Russell Smith, Raehyeon Kim	Project Power – Russell Horth, Matthew Patience, Julien Rousseau: Greyhound – Chris Gooch, Tiago Santos, Stu Bruzek, Sneha Amin; Mulan – Christoph Salzmann, Beck Veitch, Joerg Bruemmer, Indah Maretha; Underwater – Sreejith Venugopalan, Ruslan Borysov, Susil Sabat, Andreas Andersson
Outstanding Special (Practical) Effects in a Photoreal or Animated Project	
Fear the Walking Dead – Bury Her Next to Jasper's Leg – Frank Iudica, Scott Roark, Daniel J. Yates	

=== Television ===
Outstanding Visual Effects in a Photoreal Episode	Outstanding Supporting Visual Effects in a Photoreal Episode
The Mandalorian – "Chapter 9: The Marshal" – Joe Bauer, Abbigail Keller, Hal Hickel, Richard Bluff, Roy Cancino: Lovecraft Country – "Jig-A-Bobo" – Kevin Blank, Robin Griffin, Pietro Ponti, Francois Dumoulin; Star Trek: Discovery – "Su'Kal" – Jason Michael Zimmerman, Aleksandra Kochoska, Ante Dekovic, Ivan Kondrup Jensen; Timmy Failure: Mistakes Were Made – Rich McBride, Leslie Lerman, Nicolas Chevallier, Anders Beer, Tony Lazarowich; Westworld – "Crisis Theory" – Jay Worth, Elizabeth Castro, Bruce Branit, Joe Wehmeyer, Mark Byers	The Crown – "Gold Stick" – Ben Turner, Reece Ewing, Andrew Scrase, Jonathan Wood: I Know This Much Is True – Episode 1 – Eric Pascarelli, Keith Kolder, Ariel Altman; Mrs. America – Shirley – Janelle Croshaw, Kaylie Whitcher, Leonardo Silva, Zena Bielewicz, Michael Innanen; Survive – Ariel Altman, Rae Welty, Caius Wong, Carl Fong; Vikings – "Best Laid Plans" – Dominic Remane, Bill Halliday, Tom Morrison, Ovidiu Cinazan, Paul Byrne; Warrior – "Learn to Endure, Or Hire a Bodyguard" – Jonathan Alenskas, Leah Orsini, Nate Overstrom, David Eschrich
Outstanding Visual Effects in a Commercial	Outstanding Animated Character in an Episode or Real-Time Project
Walmart – Famous Visitors – Chris "Badger" Knight, Lori Talley, Yarin Mares, Matt Fuller: Arm & Hammer – Once Upon a Time – Kiril Mirkov, Solomon Tiigah, Vanessa Duquesnay, Prashanth Paramasivam; Burberry – Singin' In The Rain – Fabian Frank, Ryan Hancocks, Rob Richardson, Alex Lovejoy; Hornbach – It Seems Impossible Until You Do It – Ben Cronin, Tomek Zietkiewicz, Amir Bazzazi, Bruno Fukumothi; PlayStation – The Edge – Diarmid Harrison-Murray, Tom Igglesden, Alex Gabucci, Tom Raynor; Xbox – Us Dreamers – Dan Seddon, Elexis Stearn, Fabian Frank, Zhenya Vladi	The Mandalorian – "Chapter 13: The Jedi"; The Child – John Rosengrant, Peter Clarke, Scott Patton, Hal Hickel: The Crown – "The Balmoral test"; Imperial Stag – Ahmed Gharraph, Ross Burgess, Gabriela Ruch Salmeron, Joel Best; The Mandalorian – "Chapter 9: The Marshal"; Krayt Dragon – Paul Kavanagh, Zaini Mohamed Jalani, Michal Kriukow, Nihal Friedel; Timmy Failure: Mistakes Were Made; "Total" – Maxime Masse, Hennadii Prykhodko, Luc Girard, Sophie Burie
Outstanding Animated Character in a Commercial	Outstanding Created Environment in an Episode, Commercial, or Real-Time Project
Arm & Hammer – Once Upon a Time; Tuxedo Tom – Shiny Rajan, Silvia Bartoli, Matias Heker, Tiago Dias Mota: AFK Arena – Toilet Uzgahm – Chloe Dawe, Brad Noble, Tim van Hussen, Simon Legrand; Far Cry 6 – Legacy; Anton – Maxime Luere, Leon Berelle, Rémi Kozyra, Dominique Boidin; Legends of Runeterra – Breathe, Darius – Maxime Luere, Leon Berelle, Rémi Kozyra, Dominique Boidin; TK Maxx – The Lil Goat – Kiril Mirkov, Silvia Bartoli, Chris Welsby, David Bryan	The Mandalorian – "Chapter 15: The Believer"; Morak Jungle – Enrico Damm, Johanes Kurnia, Phi Tran, Tong Tran: Brave New World – "New London" – Guy Williams, Justin Gros-Désir, Markus Sterner, Ryan Clarke; Cyberpunk 2077 – "Night City" – Jakub Knapik, Lucjan Więcek; Lovecraft Country – "Tulsa 1921" – Patrice Poissant, Pauline Lavelle, Mohamed Abdou Elhakim, Alan Lam; The Mandalorian – "Chapter 12: The Siege", Nevarro Canyon – Kevin George, Aaron Barr, Piotr Tatar, Abel Milanés Betancourt
Outstanding Effects Simulations in an Episode, Commercial, or Real-Time Project	Outstanding Compositing in an Episode
Lovecraft Country – "Strange Case"; Chrysalis – Federica Foresti, Johan Gabrielsson, Hugo Medda, Andreas Krieg: PlayStation – The Edge – Tom Raynor, Andreu Lucio, Martin Aufinger, Platon Filimonov; Tales from the Loop – Loretta's House – Dominik Kirouac, Gaël Chopin, Sylvain Nouveau, Laurent Pancaccini; The Mandalorian – "Chapter 9: The Marshal"; Krayt Dragon – HuaiYuan Teh, Don Wong, Mathieu Chardonnet, Prashanth Bhagavan	Lovecraft Country – "Strange Case"; Crysalis – Viktor Andersson, Linus Lindblom, Mattias Sandelius, Crawford Reilly: The Mandalorian – "Chapter 15: The Believer" – Peter Demarest, Christopher Balog, Shawn Mason, David Wahlberg; The Mandalorian – "Chapter 9: The Marshal" – Nicolas Caillier, Simon Rafin, SiangKee Poh, Simon Marinof; The Mandalorian – "Chapter 10: The Passenger" – TC Harrison, Tami Carter, Jaume Creus Costabella, Shane Davidson
Outstanding Compositing in a Commercial	
Burberry – Singin' In the Rain – Alex Lovejoy, Mithun Alex, David Filipe, Amresh Kumar: Perrier – Heat – Stéphane Pivron, Franck Lambertz, Harry Bardak, Christophe Courgeau; PlayStation – The Edge – Alex Gabucci, Rebecca Clay, Alex Grey, Alex Kulikov; Walmart – Famous Visitors – Chris “Badger” Knight, Ben Smith, Jake Albers, Franz Kol	

=== Other categories ===
Outstanding Visual Effects in a Real-Time Project	Outstanding Visual Effects in a Special Venue Project
Ghost of Tsushima – Jason Connell, Matt Vainio, Jasmin Patry, Joanna Wang: Assassin's Creed Valhalla – Raphael Lacoste, Jean-Sebastien Guay, Virginie Cinq-Mars, Thierry Beaumont; Cyberpunk 2077 – Jakub Knapik, Małgorzata Mitręga, Piotr Suchodolski, Krzysztof Krzyścin; Spider-Man: Miles Morales - Reactor Finale – Gavin Goulden, Jess Reed, Bryanna Lindsey, Mike Yosh; The Last of Us Part II – Neil Druckmann, Eben Cook, Erick Pangilinan, John Sweeney	The Bourne Stuntacular – Salvador Zalvidea, Tracey Gibbons, George Allan, Matthías Bjarnason, Scott Smith: Asteroid Hunters – Antoine Durr, Jini Durr, Bert Poole, Neishaw Ali; Mickey & Minnie's Runaway Railway – Ryan Donoghue, Becky Train, Blaine Kennison, Nick da Silva, Corban Prim; The March – Aruna Inversin, Peter Nelson, Kevin Williams, Sean Kealey
Outstanding Visual Effects in a Student Project	
Migrants – Antoine Dupriez, Hugo Caby, Lucas Lermytte, Zoé Devise: Time's Down – Valentin Soulard, François Brugalières, Nils Lemonnier, Yan Weitlauff, Jonathan Bacheter; Aral – Cédric Moens de Hase, Benoit Paya, Charles Morhain, Mathilde Dallamaggiore; Strands of Mind – Adrian Meyer, Laura Messner
