= Visual Effects Society Award for Outstanding Special (Practical) Effects in a Photoreal Project =

Annual US visual effects award

The Visual Effects Society Award for Outstanding Special (Practical) Effects in a Photoreal or Animated Project is one of the annual awards given by the Visual Effects Society. The award goes to artists whose work in special/practical effects, have been deemed worthy of recognition. The award has been handed out intermittently since the first VES awards. Only twice was it awarded to television broadcasts or commercials (in 2004 and 2008), and was award for film from 2003 to 2009, with the exception being 2006. It was reintroduced in 2020, awarding any photoreal and/or animated project.

== Winners and nominees ==
=== 2000s ===
Year	Film	Nominee(s)
2002	Best Special Effects in a Motion Picture	
2002	The Lord of the Rings: The Two Towers	Steve Ingram, Blair Foord, Rich Cordobes, Scott Harens
2002	Die Another Day	Chris Corbould
2003	Outstanding Special Effects in Service to Visual Effects in a Motion Picture	
2003	Pirates of the Caribbean: The Curse of the Black Pearl	Geoff Heron, Robert Clot, Jason Brackett, John McLeod
2003	The Lord of the Rings: The Return of the King	Scott Harens, Chuck Schuman, Sven Harens
2003	Outstanding Special Effects in Service to Visual Effects in a Televised Program, Music Video, or Commercial	
2003	Carnivàle: "Milfay"	Thomas L. Bellissimo, Charles Belardinelli
2003	Carnivàle: "Black Blizzard"	Thomas L. Bellissimo
2004	Outstanding Special Effects in Service to Visual Effects in a Motion Picture	
2004	The Aviator	Robert Spurlock, Richard Stutsman, Matthew Gratzner, R. Brice Steinheimer
2004	Spider-Man 2	John Frazier, Jim Schwalm, Jim Nagle, Dave Amborn
2004	Van Helsing	Geoff Heron, Chad Taylor
2006	Outstanding Special Effects in a Feature Motion Picture	
2006	Casino Royale	Chris Corbould, Peter Notley, Ian Lowe, Roy Quinn
2006	Superman Returns	Neil Corbould, David Brighton, David Young, Robert Heggie
2007	Outstanding Special Effects in a Feature Motion Picture	
2007	Harry Potter and the Order of the Phoenix	John Richardson, Stephen Hamilton, Richard Farris, Stephen Hutchinson
2007	Outstanding Special Effects in a Broadcast Program or Commercial	
2007	Lexus Hydrant: Actively Safe	David Peterson, Anthony De La Cruz
2008	Outstanding Special Effects in a Feature Motion Picture	
2008	The Dark Knight (Overall Effects)	Chris Corbould, Peter Notley, Ian Lowe
2008	Defiance (Special Effects)	Neil Corbould, Steven Warner, Anne Marie Walters, Alan Young

=== 2010s ===
Year	Project	Nominee(s)
2019	Outstanding Special (Practical) Effects in a Photoreal or Animated Project	
2019	The Dark Crystal: Age of Resistance: "She Knows All the Secrets"	Sean Mathiesen, Jon Savage, Toby Froud, Phil Harvey
2019	Aladdin (Magic Carpet)	Mark Holt, Jay Mallet, Will Wyatt, Dickon Mitchell
2019	Game of Thrones: The Bells	Sam Conway, Terry Palmer, Laurence Harvey, Alastair Vardy
2019	Terminator: Dark Fate	Neil Corbould, David Brighton, Ray Ferguson, Keith Dawson

=== 2020s ===
Year	Project	Nominee(s)
2020	Fear the Walking Dead: "Bury Her Next to Jasper's Leg"	Frank Iudica, Scott Roark, Daniel J. Yates
2021	Outstanding Special (Practical) Effects in a Photoreal Project	
2021	Jungle Cruise	JD Schwalm, Nick Rand, Robert Spurlock, Nick Byrd
2021	Eternals	Neil Corbould, Keith Corbould, Ray Ferguson, Chris Motjuoadi
2021	The Matrix Resurrections	JD Schwalm, Brendon O’Dell, Michael Kay, Pau Costa Moeller
2021	The Tomorrow War	JD Schwalm, Wayne Rowe, Jim Schwalm, Haukur Karlsson
2022	Outstanding Special (Practical) Effects in a Photoreal or Animated Project	
2022	Avatar: The Way of Water: "Current Machine and Wave Pool"	J. D. Schwalm, Richie Schwalm, Nick Rand, Robert Spurlock
2022	Black Adam: Robotic Flight	J. D. Schwalm, Nick Rand, Andrew Hyde, Andy Robot
2022	The Lord of the Rings: The Rings of Power: "Adrift" Middle Earth Storm	Dean Clarke, Oliver Gee, Eliot Naimie, Mark Robson
2022	Mad God	Phil Tippett, Chris Morley, Webster Colcord, Johnny McLeod
