= Valentina Rosselli (artist) =

Visual effects artist

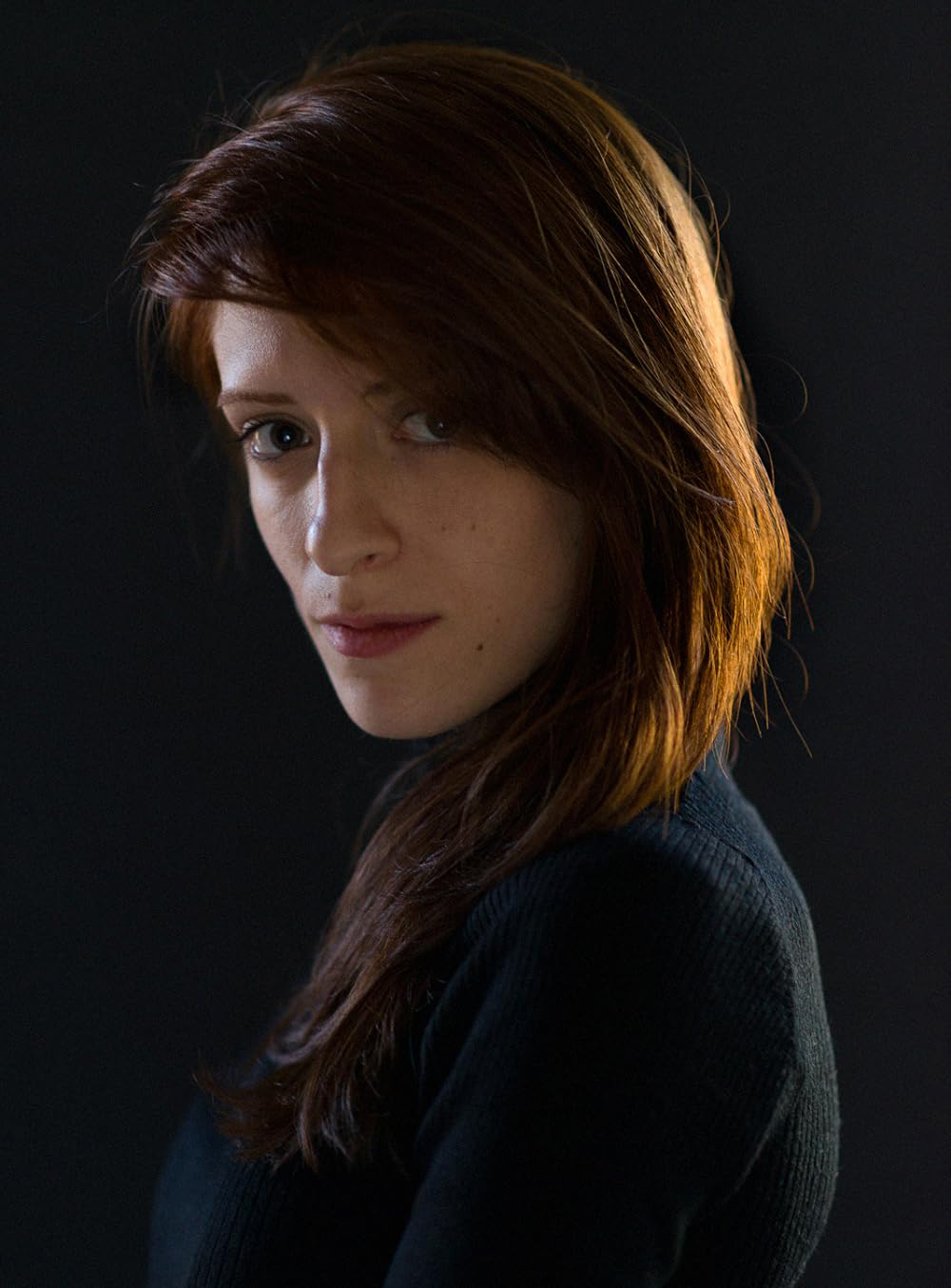
- Born: March 10, 1992; Italy
- Occupations: Visual Effects Artist, Concept Artist

Valentina Rosselli (born March 10, 1992) is an Italian-British visual effects artist who won the Visual Effects Society Award for Outstanding Animated Character in a Photoreal Feature for the work on Ivan, the gorilla in Disney's The One and Only Ivan.

== Work ==
Rosselli is known for her work on films such as Ghost in the Shell, Dumbo, Cruella, Mufasa:The Lion King and The One and Only Ivan, for which, in 2021, she won the Visual Effects Society Award for Outstanding Animated Character in a Photoreal Feature at the 19th Visual Effects Society Awards, for the work on Ivan, the gorilla.

In 2023, she received a nomination for the Visual Effects Society Award for Outstanding Animated Character in a Photoreal Feature for her work on Honest John in Disney's Pinocchio, which was directed by Robert Zemeckis, at the 21st Visual Effects Society Awards.

In 2025, Rosselli received a third nomination for the Visual Effects Society Award for Outstanding Animated Character in a Photoreal Feature for her work on Taka in Mufasa:The Lion King, which was directed by Barry Jenkins, at the 23rd Visual Effects Society Awards.

== Filmography ==
Year	Title	Role
2026	Masters of the Universe	lead digital artist: lead lookdev td & surfacing, character concept artist
2026	Remarkably Bright Creatures	lead texturing and lookdev
2025	Lilo & Stitch	lead digital artist: lead texturing and lookdev
2024	Mufasa: The Lion King	visual effects lead asset artist, character concept artist
2023	The Little Mermaid	visual effects lead asset artist, character concept artist
2022	Disney's Pinocchio	lead digital artist: lead texturing and lookdev td
2021	Ghostbusters: Afterlife	texturing and lookdev TD
2021	Cruella	texturing and lookdev TD
2020	The One and Only Ivan	modeling, texturing and lookdev TD
2020	The Call of the Wild	texturing and lookdev TD
2019	The Lion King	texturing TD
2019	Godzilla: King of the Monsters	texturing TD
2019	Dumbo	texturing TD
2018	Aquaman	texturing TD
2017	The Dark Tower	texturing TD
2017	The Mummy	texturing TD
2017	Ghost in the Shell	texturing TD

== Accolades ==
Award	Date of ceremony	Category	Nominated work	Result	Ref.
23rd Visual Effects Society Awards	February 11, 2025	Visual Effects Society Award for Outstanding Animated Character in a Photoreal Feature	Mufasa: The Lion King: "Taka"	Nominated	[10]
21st Visual Effects Society Awards	February 15, 2023	Visual Effects Society Award for Outstanding Animated Character in a Photoreal Feature	Disney's Pinocchio: "Honest John"	Nominated	[8]
19th Visual Effects Society Awards	March 1, 2021	Visual Effects Society Award for Outstanding Animated Character in a Photoreal Feature	The One and Only Ivan: "Ivan"	Won	[7]
