= Visual Effects Society Award for Outstanding Animated Character in a Photoreal Feature =

Annual US film award

The Visual Effects Society Award for Outstanding Animated Character in a Photoreal Feature is one of the annual awards given by the Visual Effects Society starting from 2002. Since its inception, the award's title has gone through six different title changes, and one major category shift. First awarded in 2002, the award was titled "Outstanding Character Animation in a Live Action Motion Picture" and given to the best character animation in a live action film, with no specific character cited. This would change in 2004, when the category was re-titled "Outstanding Performance by an Animated Character in a Live Action Motion Picture", and given to visual effects artists for work on a specified character. The category was again re-titled in 2008, this time to "Outstanding Animated Character in a Live Action Feature Motion Picture". In 2014, it was titled "Outstanding Performance of an Animated Character in a Photoreal/Live Action Feature Motion Picture", but changed in 2016 to "Outstanding Animated Performance in a Photoreal Feature" and once again in 2017 to its current title.

== Winners and nominees ==
=== 2000s ===
Outstanding Character Animation in a Live Action Motion Picture

Year	Film	Character	Nominee(s)
2002	The Lord of the Rings: The Two Towers		Richard Baneham, Eric Saindon, Ken McGaugh and Bay Raitt
2002	Harry Potter and the Chamber of Secrets	Dobby's Face	David Andrews, Steven Rawlins, Frank Gravatt and Doug Smythe
2002	Star Wars: Episode II – Attack of the Clones		Rob Coleman, Hal Hickel, Chris Armstrong and James Tooley
2003	The Lord of the Rings: The Return of the King		Steven Hornby, Andy Serkis, Matthias Menz, and Greg Butler
2003	Hulk		Scott Benza, Jamy Wheless, Kevin Martel and Aaron Ferguson
2003	Pirates of the Caribbean: The Curse of the Black Pearl		Susan Campbell, James Tooley, Geoff Campbell and Dugan Beach

Outstanding Performance by an Animated Character in a Live Action Motion Picture

Year	Film	Character	Nominee(s)
2004	Harry Potter and the Prisoner of Azkaban	Hippogriff	Michael Eames, David Lomax, Felix Balbas and Pablo Grillo
2004	Hellboy	Sammael	Dovi Anderson, Todd Labonte, Sven Jensen and Paul Thuriot
2004	Lemony Snicket's A Series of Unfortunate Events	Sunny	Rick O'Connor, Martin Murphy, Indira Guettieri and Sam Breach
2005	King Kong	King Kong	Andy Serkis, Christian Rivers, Atsushi Sato, Guy Williams
2005	The Chronicles of Narnia: The Lion, the Witch and the Wardrobe	Aslan	Richie Baneham, Erik De Boer, Matt Logue, Joe Ksander
2005	Harry Potter and the Goblet of Fire	Dragon	Steve Rawlins, Eric Wong, Robert Weaver and Steve Nichols
2006	Pirates of the Caribbean: Dead Man's Chest	Davy Jones	Steve Walton, Jung-Seung Hong, Marc Chu and James Tooley
2006	Charlotte's Web	Templeton	Todd Labonte, Jason Armstrong, Sven Jensen and David Richard Nelson
2006	Charlotte's Web	Wilbur	Grant Adam, Daniel Fotheringham, Avi Goodman and Paul Buckley
2007	Pirates of the Caribbean: At World's End	Davy Jones	Hal Hickel, Marc Chu, Jakub Pistecky, Maia Kayser
2007	Enchanted	Pip	Tom Gibbons, James W. Brown, David Richard Nelson and John Koester
2007	I Am Legend	Infected Leader	David Schaub, Marco Marenghi and Josh Beveridge
2007	Spider-Man 3	Sandman	Chris Yang, Bernd Anger, Dominick Cecere and Remington Scott
2007	Transformers	Optimus Prime	Rick O'Connor, Doug Sutton, Keiji Yamaguchi and Jeff White
2007	The Water Horse: Legend of the Deep	Crusoe	Richard Francis-Moore, Martin Hill, Marco Revelant and Daniel Barrett

Outstanding Animated Character in a Live Action Feature Motion Picture

Year	Film	Character	Nominee(s)
2008	The Curious Case of Benjamin Button	Benjamin Button	Steve Preeg, Matthias Wittmann, Tom St. Amand and David McLean
2008	Hellboy 2: The Golden Army	Elemental Sequence	Colin McEvoy and Christoph Ammann
2008	Iron Man	Iron Man	Hal Hickel, Bruce Holcomb, James Tooley and John Walker
2008	The Spiderwick Chronicles	Hogsqueal	Todd Labonte, Michael Brunet, Nathan Fredenburg and Aharon Bourland
2009	Avatar	Neytiri	Joe Letteri, Andrew R. Jones, Jeff Unay and Zoe Saldaña
2009	District 9	Christopher Johnson	Steve Nichols, Jeremy Mesana, Vera Zivny and Brett Ineson
2009	G-Force	Bucky	Benjamin Cinelli, Dustin Wicke, Peter Tieryas and Ryan Yee
2009	Watchmen	Doctor Manhattan	Keith Smith, Kevin Hudson, Victor Schutz and Aaron Campbell

=== 2010s ===
Year	Film	Character	Nominee(s)
2010	Harry Potter and the Deathly Hallows – Part 1	Dobby	Matthieu Vig, Ben Lambert, Laurie Brugger and Marine Poirson
2010	Cats & Dogs: The Revenge of Kitty Galore	Kitty Galore	William Groebe, Brian Medenhall, Aharon Bourland, Steve Reding
2010	The Chronicles of Narnia: The Voyage of the Dawn Treader	Reepicheep	Gabriele Zucchelli, Catherine Mullan, Benoit Dubuc and Pete Bayley
2010	Harry Potter and the Deathly Hallows – Part 1	Kreacher	Laurent Laban, Will Brand, Matthieu Goutte and Jason Baker
2011	Rise of the Planet of the Apes	Caesar	Daniel Barrett, Florian Fernandez, Matthew Muntean, Eric Reynolds
2011	Harry Potter and the Deathly Hallows – Part 2	The Gringotts Dragon	Yasunoby Arahori, Tom Bracht, Gavin Harrison and Chris Lentz
2011	Paul	Paul	Anders Beer, Julian Foddy, Jody Johnson and David Lowry
2011	The Thing	Edvard/Adam	Lyndon Barrois, Fred Chapman, Greg Massie and Marco Menco
2012	Life of Pi	Richard Parker	Erik De Boer, Sean Comer, Betsy Asher Hall, Kai-Hua Lan
2012	The Avengers	The Hulk	Marc Chu, John Doublestein, Cyrus Jam, Jason Smith
2012	The Hobbit: An Unexpected Journey	Goblin King	Jung Min Chang, James Jacobs, David Clayton and Guillaume Francois
2012	The Hobbit: An Unexpected Journey	Gollum	Gino Acevedo, Alessandro Bonora, Jeff Capogreco, Kevin Estey
2013	The Hobbit: The Desolation of Smaug	Smaug	Eric Reynolds, David Clayton, Myriam Catrin and Guillaume Francois
2013	Gravity	Ryan	Max Solomon, Mathieu Vig, Michael Brunet and David Shirk
2013	Pacific Rim	Kaiju-Leatherback	Jakub Pistecky, Frank Gravatt, Cyrus Jam and Chris Havreberg

Outstanding Performance of an Animated Character in a Photoreal/Live Action Feature Motion Picture

Year	Film	Character	Nominee(s)
2014	Dawn of the Planet of the Apes	Caesar	Paul Story, Eteuati Tema, Andrea Merlo and Emiliano Padovani
2014	Dawn of the Planet of the Apes	Koba	Daniel Barrett, Alessandro Bonora, Mark Edward Allen and Masaya Suzuki
2014	Guardians of the Galaxy	Rocket	Kevin Spruce, Rachel Williams, Laurie Brugger and Mark Wilson
2014	Maleficent	Thistlewit	Darren Hendler, Matthias Wittmann, Jeremy Buttell and Elliot Rosenstein

Outstanding Animated Performance in a Photoreal Feature

Year	Film	Character	Nominee(s)
2015	The Revenant	The Bear	Matt Shumway, Gaelle Morand, Karin Cooper and Leandro Estebecorena
2015	Avengers: Age of Ultron	The Hulk	Jakub Pistecky, Lana Lan, John Walker and Sean Comer
2015	Chappie	Chappie	Chris Harvey, Mark Wendell and Robert Bourgeault
2015	Star Wars: The Force Awakens	Maz Kanata	Joel Bodin, Arslan Elver, Ian Comley and Stephen Cullingford
2016	The Jungle Book	King Louie	Paul Story, Dennis Yoo, Jack Tema and Andrei Coval
2016	Fantastic Beasts and Where to Find Them	Niffler	Laurent Laban, Gabriel Beauvais-Tremblay, Luc Girard and Romain Rico
2016	The Jungle Book	Shere Khan	Chris Harvey, Mark Wendell and Robert Bourgeault
2016	Rogue One: A Star Wars Story	Grand Moff Tarkin	Sven Jensen, Jee Young Park, Steve Walton and Cyrus Jam
2016	Warcraft	Durotan	Sunny Wei, Brian Cantwell, Brian Paik and Jee Young Park

Outstanding Animated Character in a Photoreal Feature

Year	Film	Character	Nominee(s)
2017	War for the Planet of the Apes	Caesar	Sunny Wei, Dennis Yoo, Ludovic Chailloleau, Douglas McHale and Tim Forbes
2017	Blade Runner 2049	Rachael	Axel Akkeson, Stefano Carter, Wesley Chandler and Ian Cooke-Grimes
2017	Kong: Skull Island	King Kong	Laurent Laban, Gabriel Beauvais-Tremblay, Luc Girard and Romain Rico
2017	War for the Planet of the Apes	Bad Ape	Eteuati Tema, Aidan Martin, Florian Fernandez and Mathias Larserud
2018	Avengers: Infinity War	Thanos	Jan Philip Cramer, Darren Hendler, Paul Story, Sidney Kombo-Kintombo
2018	Christopher Robin	Tigger	Arslan Elver, Kayn Garcia, Laurent Laban and Mariano Mendiburu
2018	Jurassic World: Fallen Kingdom	Indoraptor	Jance Rubinchik, Ted Lister, Yannick Gillain, Keith Ribbons
2018	Ready Player One	Art3mis	Dave Shirk, Brian Cantwell, Jung-Seung Hong and Kim Ooi
2019	Alita: Battle Angel	Alita	Michael Cozens, Mark Haenga, Olivier Lesaint, Dejan Momcliovic
2019	Avengers: Endgame	Smart Hulk	Kevin Martel, Ebrahim Jahromi, Sven Jensen, Rober Allman
2019	Gemini Man	Junior	Paul Story, Stuart Adcock, Emiliano Padovani, Marco Revelant
2019	The Lion King	Scar	Gabriel Arnold, James Hood, Julia Friedl, Daniel Fortheringham

=== 2020s ===
Year	Film	Character	Nominee(s)
2020	The One and Only Ivan	Ivan	Valentina Rosselli, Thomas Huizer, Andrea De Martis, William Bell
2020	The Kangaroo Chronicles	Kangaroo	Claudius Urban, Sebastian Badea, Dorian Knapp, Ruth Wiegand
2020	Jingle Jangle: A Christmas Journey	Don Juan Diego	Eric Guaglione, Shuchi Singhal, Adrien Annesley, Mahmoud Ellithy
2020	The Witches	Daisy	Jye Skinn, Sarah Fuller, Marco Iannaccone, Fredrik Sundqvist
2021	Finch	Jeff	Harinarayan Rajeev, Matthias Schoenegger, Simon Allen, Paul Nelson
2021	Flora & Ulysses	Ulysses	Pierre-Loïc Hamon, Sachin Tyagi, Nandini Nambiar, Loïc Mireault
2021	Jungle Cruise	Aguirre	Alexander Lee, Claus Pedersen, Rasely Ma, Gary Wu
2021	Venom: Let There Be Carnage	Carnage	Richard Spriggs, Ricardo Silva, Lucas Cuenca, Federico Frassinelli
2022	Avatar: The Way of Water	Kiri	Harinarayan Rajeev, Matthias Schoenegger, Simon Allen, Paul Nelson
2022	Beast	Lion	Alvise Avati, Bore Şahin, Chris McGaw, Krzysztof Boyoko
2022	Disney's Pinocchio	Honest John	Christophe Paradis, Valentina Rosselli, Armita Khanlarpour, Kyoungmin Kim
2022	Slumberland	Pig	Fernando Lopes Herrera, Victor Dinis, Martine Chartrand, Lucie Martinetto
2023	Guardians of the Galaxy Vol. 3	Rocket	Nathan McConnel, Andrea De Martis, Antony Magdalinidis, Rachel Williams
2023	Aquaman and the Lost Kingdom	Topo the Octopus	Thomas Ward, Andrew Butler, Felix Slinger-Thompson, Jacob Burstein
2023	Godzilla Minus One	Godzilla	Kosuke Taguchi, Takashi Yamazaki
2023	Wonka	Oompa Loompa	Dale Newton, Kunal Ayer, Valentina Ercolani, Gabor Foner
2024	Better Man	Robbie Williams	Milton Ramírez, Andrea Merlo, Seoungseok Charlie Kim, Eteuati Tema
2024	Kingdom of the Planet of the Apes	Noa	Rachael Dunk, Andrei Coval, John Sore, Niels Peter Kaagaard
2024	Kingdom of the Planet of the Apes	Raka	Seoungseok Charlie Kim, Giorgio Lafratta, Tim Teramoto, Aidan Martin
2024	Mufasa: The Lion King	Taka	Klaus Skovbo, Valentina Rosselli, Eli De Koninck, Amelie Talarmain

== Superlatives ==
=== Films with Multiple Nominations ===
2 Nominations

- Charlotte's Web (2006)
- Dawn of the Planet of the Apes*
- Harry Potter and the Deathly Hallows – Part 1*
- The Hobbit: An Unexpected Journey
- The Jungle Book (2016)*
- War for the Planet of the Apes*

=== Characters with Multiple Awards ===
3 Wins

- Caesar

2 Wins

- Davy Jones
