= 2nd Visual Effects Society Awards =

US film and TV awards ceremony in 2004

2nd Visual Effects Society Awards

February 18, 2004

Best Visual Effects - Motion Picture:
The Lord of the Rings: The Return of the King

The 2nd Visual Effects Society Awards, given on February 18, 2004, honored the best visual effects in film and television. The ceremony was held at the Hollywood Palladium and an edited version was broadcast on TechTV.

== Winners and nominees ==
(Winners in bold)

=== Honorary Awards ===
Lifetime Achievement Award:

- **George Lucas**

=== Film ===
| Outstanding Visual Effects in an Effects Driven Motion Picture | Outstanding Supporting Visual Effects in a Motion Picture |
|---|---|
| **The Lord of the Rings: The Return of the King** – Jim Rygiel, Dean Wright, Joe Letteri, Randall William Cook: The Matrix Revolutions – John Gaeta, Kim Libreri, George Murphy, Craig Hayes; Pirates of the Caribbean: The Curse of the Black Pearl – John Knoll, Hal Hickel, Charles Gibson, Jill Brooks | **The Last Samurai** – Jeffrey A. Okun, Thomas Boland, Bill Mesa, Ray McIntyre, Jr.: Bad Boys II – Carey Villegas, Rob Legato, David Taritero, Layne Friedman; Master and Commander: The Far Side of the World – Stefen Fangmeier, Nathan McGuinness, Robert Stromberg, Brooke Breton |
| Best Single Visual Effect of the Year in any Medium | Outstanding Character Animation in a Live Action Motion Picture |
| **The Matrix Reloaded - Trailer Top Crash** – John Gaeta, Dan Glass, Adrian DeWet, Greg Juby: The Hulk – Dennis Muren, Scott Benza, Michael DiComo, Wilson Tang; The Lord of the Rings: The Return of the King – Jim Rygiel, Dean Wright, Joe Letteri, Randall William Cook | **The Lord of the Rings: The Return of the King** – Steven Hornby, Andy Serkis, Matthias Menz, Greg Butler: The Hulk – Scott Benza, Jamy Wheless, Kevin Martel, Aaron Ferguson; Pirates of the Caribbean: The Curse of the Black Pearl – Susan Campbell, James Tooley, Geoff Campbell, Dugan Beach |
| Outstanding Character Animation in an Animated Motion Picture | Outstanding Special Effects in Service to Visual Effects in a Motion Picture |
| **Finding Nemo - Speaking Whale** – Andrew Gordon, Brett Coderre: Finding Nemo - Inside the Whale – Dave DeVan, Gini Santos | **Pirates of the Caribbean: The Curse of the Black Pearl** – Geoff Heron, Robert Clot, Jason Brackett, John McLeod: The Lord of the Rings: The Return of the King – Scott Harens, Chuck Schuman, Sven Harens |
| Outstanding Matte Painting in a Motion Picture | Outstanding Models and Miniatures in a Motion Picture |
| **Pirates of the Caribbean: The Curse of the Black Pearl** – Yannick Dusseault, Susumu Yukuhiro, Jonathan Harb: The Hulk – Brett Northcutt, Joshua Ong; Peter Pan – Yusei Uesugi, Giles Hancock | **The Lord of the Rings: The Return of the King** – Richard Taylor, Paul Van Ommen, Eric Saindon: Pirates of the Caribbean: The Curse of the Black Pearl - Captain Barbossa – Geoff Campbell, James Tooley, Steve Walton, Dugan Beach; Pirates of the Caribbean: The Curse of the Black Pearl - The Interceptor – Charlie Bailey, Peter Bailey, Robert Edwards, Don Bies |
| Outstanding Visual Effects Photography in a Motion Picture | Outstanding Compositing in a Motion Picture |
| **The Matrix Reloaded - U-Cap Facial Photography** – Kim Libreri, George Borshukov, Paul Ryan, John Gaeta: The Lord of the Rings: The Return of the King – Alex Funke, Rob Kerr, Henk Prins; Pirates of the Caribbean: The Curse of the Black Pearl – Carl Miller, Mike Conte, Tami Carter; Terminator 3: Rise of the Machines – Pat Sweeney, Mike Bienstock, Grady Cofer, John Hansen | **Master and Commander: The Far Side of the World** – Philip R. Brennan: The League of Extraordinary Gentlemen – George Macri, Mike Hardison, Patrick Murphy, Dan Trezise; The Lord of the Rings: The Return of the King – Mortitz Glaesle, Mark Lewis, Kara Vandeleur |
| Outstanding Performance by a Male or Female Actor in an Effects Film | |
| **The Lord of the Rings: The Return of the King - Sean Astin**: Peter Pan - Ludivine Sagnier; Pirates of the Caribbean: The Curse of the Black Pearl - Keira Knightley | |

=== Television ===
| Outstanding Visual Effects in a Television Series | Outstanding Visual Effects in a Television Miniseries, Movie or Special |
|---|---|
| **Buffy the Vampire Slayer** - Season 7, Episode 22 – Loni Peristere, Patti Gannon, Ronald Thornton, Chris Zapara: Carnivàle - Episode 1.01 – David T. Altenau, Ariel V. Shaw, Thomas L. Bellissimo, Barbara J. Marshall; ER - Episode #176008 – Sam Nicholson, Kyle J. Healey, Eric Grenaudier, Anthony Ocampo; Sea Monsters – A Walking with Dinosaurs Trilogy – Max Tyrie, Tim Greenwood, Darren Byford, Mike Milne | **Battlestar Galactica** – Gary Hutzel, Kristen L. Branan, Emile E. Smith, Lee Stringer: Dinosaur Planet – Sebastien Dostie, Claude Precourt, Isabelle Riva; Frank Herbert's Children of Dune - Night 1 – Ernest Farino, Tim McHugh, Chris Q. Zapara, Glenn A. Campbell; Helen of Troy – Sam Nicholson, Adam Ealovega, Joshua Hatton, Tim Donahue |
| Outstanding Visual Effects in a Commercial | Outstanding Visual Effects in a Music Video |
| **Johnnie Walker - Fish** – Murray Butler, William Bartlett, Jake Mengers, Helen Mackenzie: Nike - Gamebreaker – Eric Barba, Richard Morton, Walt Hyneman, Dave Stern; Nike - Speed Chain – Eric Barba, Greg Teegarden, Dave Stern, Jay Barton | **Missy Elliott - Pass that Dutch** – Jonathan Keeton, Aladino Debert, Andy McKenna, Scott Rader: Outkast - Hey Ya! – Elad Offer |
| Outstanding Special Effects in Service to Visual Effects in a Televised Program, Music Video or Commercial | Outstanding Matte Painting in a Televised Program, Music Video or Commercial |
| **Carnivàle - Pilot** – Thomas L. Bellissimo, Charles Belardinelli: Carnivàle - Episode #4: Dust Storm – Thomas L. Bellissimo | **Smallville - Insurgence** – Eli Jarra, Joseph Brattesani, Brian Bell: Dinosaur Planet – Arnaud Brisebois, Philippe Roberge, Sean Samuels; NCIS - 001 Yankee White – Steven J. Rogers |
| Outstanding Models and Miniatures in a Televised Program, Music Video or Commercial | Outstanding Compositing in a Televised Program, Music Video or Commercial |
| **Helen of Troy** – Anthony Ocampo: Battlestar Galactica – Lee Stringer, Jose Perez, Gabriel Koerner, Mike Enriquez | **Smallville - Accelerate** – Eli Jarra, Ivan DeWolf, Brian Harding: Angels in America – Stefano Trivelli; Battlestar Galactica – Patti Gannon, Chris Jones, Sean Apple, Jarrod Davis |
