= 3rd Visual Effects Society Awards =

US film and TV awards ceremony in 2005

3rd Visual Effects Society Awards

February 16, 2005

Best Visual Effects - Motion Picture:
Harry Potter and the Prisoner of Azkaban

The 3rd Visual Effects Society Awards, given on 16 February 2005 at the Hollywood Palladium, honored the best visual effects in film and television of 2004. An edited version of the ceremony was broadcast on HD Net.

== Winners and nominees ==
(Winners in bold)

=== Honorary Awards ===
Lifetime Achievement Award:

- **Robert Zemeckis**

George Melies Award for Pioneering:

- **Robert Abel**

Board of Directors Award:

- **Don Shay**

=== Film ===
Outstanding Visual Effects in an Effects Driven Motion Picture	Outstanding Supporting Visual Effects in a Motion Picture
**Harry Potter and the Prisoner of Azkaban** – Roger Guyett, Tim Burke, Theresa Corrao, Emma Norton: The Day After Tomorrow – Karen Goulekas, Mike Chambers, Greg Strause, Remo Balcells; Spider-Man 2 – John Dykstra, Lydia Bottegoni, Anthony LaMolinara, Scott Stokdyk	**The Aviator** – Rob Legato, Ron Ames, Matthew Gratzner, Pete Travers: Eternal Sunshine of the Spotless Mind – Louis Morin, Mark Dornfeld; Troy – Nick Davis, Chas Jarrett, Jon Thum, Gary Brozenich
Best Single Visual Effect of the Year	Outstanding Performance by an Animated Character in a Live Action Motion Picture
**The Day After Tomorrow - Tidal Wave** – Karen Goulekas, Mike Chambers, Chris Horvath, Matthew Butler: The Aviator - Hell's Angels – Rob Legato, Ron Ames, David Seager, Peter Travers; Harry Potter and the Prisoner of Azkaban - Dementor Train – Bill George, David Andrews, Sandra Scott, Dorne Huebler; Spider-Man 2 - Clock Tower - John Dykstra, Lydia Bottegoni, Dan Abrams, John Monos	**Harry Potter and the Prisoner of Azkaban - Hippogriff Character** – Michael Eames, David Lomax, Felix Balbas, Pablo Grillo: Hellboy - Sammael Character – Dovi Anderson, Todd Labonte, Sven Jensen, Paul Thuriot; Lemony Snicket's A Series of Unfortunate Events - Sunny Character – Rick O'Connor, Martin Murphy, Indira Guettieri, Sam Breach
Outstanding Performance by an Animated Character in an Animated Motion Picture	Outstanding Created Environment in a Live Action Motion Picture
**The Incredibles - Bob Parr/Mr. Incredible** – Craig T. Nelson, Bill Wise, Bill Sheffler, Bolhem Bouchiba: The Polar Express - Steamer – Michael Jeter, David Schaub, Renato Dos Anjos, Roger Vizard; Shark Tale - Angie – Renée Zellweger, Ken Duncan; Shrek 2 - Puss in Boots – Antonio Banderas, Raman Hui	**Spider-Man 2 - "NYC Street - Night"** – Dan Abrams, David Emery, Andrew Nawrot, John Hart: Bridget Jones: The Edge of Reason – Rick Leary, Jody Johnson, Pieter Warmington; I, Robot – Rachael Haupt, Mark Tait Lewis, Nick McKenzie, Geoff Tobin; The Phantom of the Opera - Opening Shot – Claas Henke, Laurent Ben-Mimoun, Anupam Das
Outstanding Models and Miniatures in a Motion Picture	Outstanding Compositing in a Motion Picture
**The Aviator - "XF11 Crash"** – Matthew Gratzner, Scott Schneider, Adam Gelbart, Leigh-Alexandra Jacob: Harry Potter and the Prisoner of Azkaban – Jose Granell, Nigel Stone; National Treasure - Treasure Room – Matthew Gratzner, Forest Fischer, Scott Beverly, Leigh-Alexandra Jacob	**Spider-Man 2 - "Train Sequence"** – Colin Drobnis, Greg Derochie, Blaine Kennison, Kenny Lam: Harry Potter and the Prisoner of Azkaban – Dorne Huebler, Jay Cooper, Patrick Brennan, Anthony Shafer; The Phantom of the Opera - Opening Shot – Claas Henke, Laurent Ben-Minoun, Anupam Das
Outstanding Performance by an Actor or Actress in a Visual Effects Film	Outstanding Special Effects in Service to Visual Effects in a Motion Picture
**Alfred Molina - Spider-Man 2**: Leonardo DiCaprio - The Aviator; Jude Law - Sky Captain and the World of Tomorrow	**The Aviator** – Robert Spurlock, Richard Stutsman, Matthew Gratzner, R. Brice Steinheimer: Spider-Man 2 – John Frazier, Jim Schwalm, Jim Nagle, Dave Amborn; Van Helsing – Geoff Heron, Chad Taylor

=== Television ===
Outstanding Visual Effects in a Broadcast Series	Outstanding Supporting Visual Effects in a Broadcast Program
**Star Trek: Enterprise - Storm Front, Part 2** – Ronald Moore, Daniel Curry, David Takemura, Fred Pienkos: Stargate Atlantis - Rising – John Gajdecki, Bruce Woloshyn, Jinnie Pak, Tara Conley; Stargate SG-1 - Lost City – James Tichenor, Shannon Gurney, Craig Van Den Biggelaar, Bruce Woloshyn	**Lost -Pilot, Part 2** – Kevin Blank, Mitch Suskin, Benoit Girard, Jerome Morin: Clubhouse - Episode #005 – Curt Miller, Jason Spratt, Doug Witsken, Michael Tonder; Spartacus – Sam Nicholson, Eric Grenaudier, Anthony Ocampo, Tim Donahue
Outstanding Visual Effects in a Broadcast Miniseries, Movie or Special	Outstanding Visual Effects in a Commercial
**Virtual History: The Secret Plot to Kill Hitler** – Jim Radford, Tom Phillips, Simon Thomas, Loraine Cooper: Dragons – Sirio Quintavalle, Alex Knox, Neil Glaseby; Earthsea – Peter Ware, Eric Grenaudier, Jared Jones, Earl Paraszcynec	**Citroën - "Alive with Technology"** – Trevor Crawford, Neill Blomkamp, Simon Van de Lagemaat, Winston Helgason: British Telecom: Network – David Lombardi, Richard Mann, Eric Durst, Kevin Prendiville; Johnnie Walker - Tree – William Bartlett, Murray Butler, Jake Mengers, Andy Boyd
Outstanding Visual Effects in a Music Video	Outstanding Performance by an Animated Character in a Live Action Broadcast Program
**Britney Spears - "Toxic"** – Bert Yukich, Chris Watts: Duran Duran - What Happens Tomorrow – Jerry Steele, Jo Steele, Brian Adler, Monique Eissing; Never - The Dream – Trevor Cawood, Simon Van de Lagemaat, Stephen Pepper, Jon Anastasiades	**Stephen King's Kingdom Hospital - Antubis Character** – William de Bosch Kemper, Brian Harder, Patrick Kalyn, Scott Paquin: Battlestar Galactica - Episode 101 - Cylon Character – Dustin Adiar, Mark Shimer, Jesse Toves, Sean Jackson
Outstanding Created Environment in a Live Action Broadcast Program	Outstanding Compositing in a Broadcast Program
**Spartacus - Opening** – Eric Grenaudier, Anthony Ocampo, Cedric Tomacruz, Michael Cook: Smallville - Crusade - Is it a bird? Is it a plane? – John Han, Brian Harding, Terry Shigemitsu, Noriaki Matsumoto; Star Trek: Enterprise - Storm Front – Pierre Drolet, Fred Pienkos, Eddie Robison, Sean Scott	**Space Odyssey: Voyage to the Planets** – George Roper, Christian Manz, Sirio Quintavalle, Pedro Sabrosa: The Librarian - Humalayan Pass sequence – Greg Groenekamp, Joel Merritt, Mamie McCall; Smallville - Crisis - Clark Kent stops a bullet sequence – John Han, Eli Jarra, Noriaki Matsumoto, Terry Shigemitsu

=== Other categories ===
Outstanding Visuals in a Video Game

**Half-Life 2** – Viktor Antonov, Randy Lundeen, Gary McTaggart, Dhabih Eng

- 007 Everything or Nothing – David Carson, Jay Riddle, Habib Zargarpour
- The Lord of the Rings: The Battle for Middle-earth – Mark Skaggs, Richard Taylor II, Matt Britton, Nate Hubbard
- The Lord of the Rings: The Third Age – Stephen Gray, Margaret Foley-Mauvais
