= Visual Effects Society Award for Outstanding Animated Character in an Animated Feature =

Annual US film award

The Visual Effects Society Award for Outstanding Animated Character in an Animated Feature is one of the annual awards given by the Visual Effects Society starting from 2002. Since its inception, the award's title has gone through six title changes, and one major category shift. First awarded in 2002, the award was titled "Best Character Animation in an Animated Motion Picture" and given to the best character animation in an animated film, with no specific character cited. This would change in 2004, when the category was re-titled "Outstanding Performance by an Animated Character in an Animated Motion Picture", and given to visual effects artists for work on a specified character. as well as the voice actor for the character. The category was again re-titled in 2008, this time to "Outstanding Animated Character in an Animated Feature Motion Picture". In 2015, it was titled "Outstanding Animated Performance in an Animated Feature", but changed in 2017 to "Outstanding Animated Character in an Animated Feature", its current title.

== Winners and nominees ==
=== 2000s ===
Outstanding Character Animation in an Animated Motion Picture

Year	Film	Character	Nominee(s)
2002	Stuart Little 2		Tony Bancroft, David Schaub, Eric Armstrong, Sean Mullen
2002	Spirit: Stallion of the Cimarron		James Baxter
2003	Finding Nemo	Speaking Whale	Andrew Gordon, Brett Coderre
2003	Finding Nemo	Inside the Whale	Dave DeVan, Gini Santos

Outstanding Performance by an Animated Character in an Animated Motion Picture

Year	Film	Character	Nominee(s)
2004	The Incredibles	Bob Parr/Mr. Incredible	Craig T. Nelson, Bill Wise, Bill Sheffler, Bolhem Bouchiba
2004	The Polar Express	Steamer	Michael Jeter, David Schaub, Renato Dos Anjos, Roger Vizard
2004	Shark Tale	Angie	Renée Zellweger, Ken Duncan
2004	Shrek 2	Puss in Boots	Antonio Banderas, Raman Hui
2005	Wallace & Gromit: The Curse of the Were-Rabbit	Gromit	Loyd Price
2005	Madagascar	King Julien	Rex Grignon, Denis Couchon
2005	Robot	Fendor	Robin Williams, David Torres, Mark Piretti, Ben Williams
2006	Cars	Mater	Larry the Cable Guy, Mike Krummhoefener, Tom Sanocki, Nancy Kato
2006	Happy Feet	Mumble's Banishment	Damien Gray, Tim Gibson, Carl Prud 'Homme
2006	Monster House	House	Umberto Lazzari, Michael Kimmel, Kui Han Lee, Owen Demers
2007	Ratatouille	Colette	Janeane Garofalo, Jaime Landes, Sonoko Konishi, Paul Aichele
2007	Beowulf	Beowulf	Keith Smith, Scott Holmes, Pericles Michielin, Kenn McDonald
2007	Shrek the Third	King Harold	John Cleese, Guillaume Aretos, Tim Cheung, Sean Mahoney
2007	Surf's Up	Chicken Joe	David Schaub, Moon Jun Kang, Brian Casper, Andreas Procopiou
2007	Surf's Up	Cody	David Schaub, Pete Nash, James Crossley, Shia LaBeouf

Outstanding Animated Character in an Animated Feature Motion Picture

Year	Film	Character	Nominee(s)
2008	WALL-E	Wall-E and Eve Truck Sequence	Ben Burtt, Victor Navone, Austin Lee, Jay Shuster
2008	Bolt	Bolt	Becky Bresee, Bob Davies, Renato Dos Anjos, Wayne Unten Jr.
2008	Bolt	Rhino	Adam Dykstra, Dave Gottlieb, Clay Kaytis, Hyrum Osmond
2008	Kung Fu Panda	Po	Jack Black, Dan Wagner, Nico Marlet, Peter Farson
2009	Up	Carl	Ed Asner, Ron Zorman, Brian Tindall, Carmen Ngai
2009	Coraline	Coraline	Travis Knight, Trey Thomas
2009	Ice Age: Dawn of the Dinosaurs	Buck	Simon Pegg, Peter de Sève
2009	Monsters vs. Aliens	B.O.B.	David Burgess, Scott Cegielski, Terran Boylan, David Weatherley

=== 2010s ===
Year	Film	Character	Nominee(s)
2010	How to Train Your Dragon	Toothless	Gabe Hordos, Cassidy Curtis, Mariette Marinus, Brent Watkins
2010	Legend of the Guardians: The Owls of Ga'Hoole	Digger	Josh Murtack, James Cunliffe, Jessica Groom, Andrew Hunt
2010	Megamind	Minion	David Cross, Rani Naamani, Dick Walsh, Adrian Tsang
2010	Tangled	Rapunzel	Tony Smeed, Amy Smeed, Becky Bresee, Kira Lehtomaki
2011	Rango	Rango	Frank Gravatt, Kevin Martel, Brian Paik, Steve Walton
2011	The Adventures of Tintin	Tintin	Gino Acevedo, Gustav Ahren, Jamie Beard, Simon Clutterbuck
2011	Puss in Boots	Puss in Boots	Antonio Banderas, Ludovic Boouancheau, Laurent Caneiro, Olivier Staphylas
2011	Rio	Nigel	Diana Diriwaechter, Sang Jun Lee, Sergio Pablos, Aamir Tarin
2012	Brave	Merida	Travis Hathaway, Olivier Soares, Peter Sumanaseni, Brian Tindall
2012	Hotel Transylvania	Dracula	Bill Haller, Tim Pixton, Jorge Vigara
2012	The Pirates! Band of Misfits	Band of Misfits	Will Becher, Jay Grace, Loyd Price
2012	Wreck-It Ralph	Vanellope von Schweetz	John Kahwaty, Suzan Kim, Michelle Robinson, Tony Smeed
2013	Frozen	Bringing the Snow Queen to Life	Alexander Alvarado, Joy Johnson, Chad Stubblefield, Wayne Unten
2013	The Croods	Eep	Line Andersen, Won Young Byun, Koji Morihiro, Chris De St. Jeor
2013	Epic	Bomba	Thom Roberts, Haven Gordon Cousins, Tim Bower, Daniel Lima
2013	Epic	Mary Katherine	Jeff Gabor, Dylan Maxwell, Sang Jun Lee, Chris Pagoria
2014	Big Hero 6	Baymax	Colin Eckart, John Kahwaty, Zach Parrish, Zack Petroc
2014	The Boxtrolls	Archibald Snatcher	Travis Knight, Jason Stalman, Michael Laubach, Kyle Williams
2014	How to Train Your Dragon 2	Hiccup Haddock	Jakob Hjort Jensen, Fabio Lignini, Stephen Candell, Hongseo Park
2014	Rio 2	Gabi	Jason Sadler, Ignacio Barrios, Drew Winey, Diana Diriwaechter

Outstanding Animated Performance in an Animated Feature

Year	Film	Character	Nominee(s)
2015	Inside Out	Joy	Shawn Krause, Tanja Krampfert, Jacob Merrell, Alexis Angelidis
2015	The Good Dinosaur	Spot	Ana Gabriela Lacaze, Jacob Brooks, Lou Hamou-Lhadj, Mark C. Harris
2015	The Peanuts Movie	Charlie Brown	Matthew Doble, Steve Vanseth, Stephen Gressak, Nikki Tomaino
2015	The Peanuts Movie	Snoopy	Jeff Gabor, Joseph Antonuccio, Ignacio Barrios, Sabine Heller
2016	Finding Dory	Hank	Jonathan Hoffman, Steven Clay Hunter, Mark Piretti, Audrey Wong
2016	Kubo and the Two Strings	Kubo	Jeff Riley, Ian Whitlock, Adam Lawthers, Jeremy Spake
2016	Kubo and the Two Strings	Monkey	Andy Bailey, Dobrin Yanev, Kim Slate, Jessica Lynn
2016	Moana	The Mighty Maui	Mack Kablan, Nikki Mull, Matthew Schiller, Marc Thyng

Outstanding Animated Character in an Animated Feature

Year	Film	Character	Nominee(s)
2017	Coco	Hèctor	Emron Grover, Jonathan Hoffman, Michael Honsel, Guilherme Sauerbronn Jacinto
2017	The Boss Baby	Boss Baby	Alec Baldwin, Carlos Puertolas, Rani Naamani, Joe Moshier
2017	Despicable Me 3	Balthazar Bratt	Eric Guillon, Bruno Dequier, Julien Soret, Benjamin Fournet
2017	The Lego Ninjago Movie	Garmadon	Matthew Everitt, Christian So, Loic Miermont, Fiona Darwin
2017	The Lego Ninjago Movie	Garma Mecha Man	Arthur Terzis, Wei Hei, Jean-Marc Ariu, Gibson Radsavanh
2018	Spider-Man: Into the Spider-Verse	Miles Morales	Marcos Kang, Chad Belteau, Humberto Rosa, Julie Bernier Gosselin
2018	Dr. Seuss' The Grinch	The Grinch	David Galante, Francois Boudaille, Olivier Luffin, Yarrow Cheney
2018	Incredibles 2	Helen Parr/Elastigirl	Michal Makarewicz, Ben Porter, Edgar Rodriguez, Kevin Singleton
2018	Ralph Breaks the Internet	Ralphzilla	Dong Joo Byun, Dave K. Komorowski, Justin Sklar, Le Joyce Tong
2019	Missing Link	Susan	Rachelle Lambden, Brenda Baumgarten, Morgan Hay, Benoit Dubuc
2019	Frozen 2	The Water Nøkk	Svetla Radivoeva, Marc Bryant, Richard E. Lehmann, Cameron Black
2019	Klaus	Jesper	Yoshimishi Tamura, Alfredo Cassano, Maxime Delalande, Jason Schwartzman
2019	Toy Story 4	Bo Peep	Radford Hurn, Tanja Krampfert, George Nguyen and Becki Rocha Tower

=== 2020s ===
Year	Film	Character	Nominee(s)
2020	Soul	Terry	Jonathan Hoffman, Jonathan Page, Peter Tieryas, Ron Zorman
2020	Onward	Dad Pants	Kristopher Campbell, Jonas Jarvers, Rob Jensen, Jacob Kuenzel
2020	Over the Moon	Chang'e	Siggi Orri Thorhannesson, Hyesok Kim, Javier Solsona, Alan Chen
2020	The SpongeBob Movie: Sponge on the Run	SpongeBob	Jacques Daigle, Guillaume Dufief, Adrien Montero, Liam Hill
2021	Encanto	Mirabel Madrigal	Kelly McClanahan, Sergi Caballer, Mary Twohig, Jose Luis "Weecho" Velasquez
2021	Luca	Luca	Gwendelyn Enderoglu, Laurie Nguyen Kim, Tanja Krampfert, Maria Lee
2021	The Mitchells vs. the Machines	Katie Mitchell	Lindsey Olivares, Kurt Judson, Soh-I Jeong, Rohini Kumar
2021	Raya and the Last Dragon	Tuk Tuk	Brian Menz, Punn Wiantrakoon, Erik Hansen, Vicky YuTzu Lin
2022	Guillermo del Toro's Pinocchio	Pinocchio	Oliver Beale, Richard Pickersgill, Brian Leif Hansen, Kim Slate
2022	Guillermo del Toro's Pinocchio	Geppetto	Charles Greenfield, Peter Saunders, Shani Lang-Rinderspacher, Noel Estevez-Baker
2022	Strange World	Splat	Leticia Gillett, Cameron Black, Dan Lipson, Louis Jones
2022	Turning Red	Panda Mei	Christopher Bolwyn, Ethan Dean, Bill Sheffler, Kureha Yokoo
2023	Spider-Man: Across the Spider-Verse	Spot	Christopher Mangnall, Craig Feifarek, Humberto Rosa, Nideep Varghese
2023	Elemental	Ember	Gwendelyn Enderoglu, Jared Fong, Jonathan Hoffman, Patrick Witting
2023	Elemental	Wade	Max Gilbert, Jacob Kuenzel, Dave Strick, Benjamin Su
2023	Teenage Mutant Ninja Turtles: Mutant Mayhem	Superfly	Gregory Coelho, Anne-Claire Leroux, Simon Cuisinier, Olivier Pierre
2024	The Wild Robot	Roz	Fabio Lignini, Yukinori Inagaki, Owen Demers, Hyun Huh
2024	Inside Out 2	Anxiety	Alexander Alvarado, Brianne Francisco, Amanda Wagner, Brenda Lin Zhang
2024	Thelma the Unicorn	Vic Diamond	Guillaume Arantes, Adrien Montero, Anne-Claire Leroux, Gaspard Roche
2024	Wallace & Gromit: Vengeance Most Fowl	Gromit	Jo Fenton, Alison Evans, Andy Symanowski, Emanuel Nevado

== Films with Multiple Nominations ==
2 Nominations

- Bolt
- Epic
- Finding Nemo
- Kubo and the Two Strings
- The Lego Ninjago Movie
- The Peanuts Movie
- Surf's Up
- Guillermo del Toro's Pinocchio
- Elemental

== Characters with Multiple Nominations ==
2 Nominations

- Puss in Boots
