= Corcept Therapeutics =

American pharmaceutical company

Corcept Therapeutics Incorporated
- Type: Public
- Traded as: Nasdaq: CORT; S&P 400 component
- Industry: Pharmaceutical Industry
- Founded: May 13, 1998; 28 years ago
- Headquarters: Redwood City, California, U.S.
- Key people: Joseph K. Belanoff (CEO, president, & director)
- Products: Pharmaceutics
- Website: www.corcept.com

Corcept Therapeutics Inc. is a pharmaceutical company engaged in the discovery, development and commercialization of drugs for the treatment of severe metabolic, psychiatric and oncologic disorders. Corcept has focused on the adverse effects of excess cortisol, studying new compounds that may mitigate those effects. Its executive team is headed by CEO, president and director Joseph K. Belanoff, MD.

== History ==
Backed by Silicon Valley biotech investors, Corcept Therapeutics was founded in May 1998 by psychiatrists Alan Schatzberg and Joseph K. Belanoff. Eight years later, Corcept remained a small firm with 11 full-time employees. Much of its work (e.g., drug manufacturing and testing on patients) was farmed out to others.

In June 2008, U.S. Senator Chuck Grassley, then the ranking Republican on the Senate Finance Committee, criticized Corcept cofounder and prominent psychiatrist Alan Schatzberg, chair of the psychiatry department at Stanford University School of Medicine, for not fully informing the university about the value of his shares in Corcept. According to Grassley, Schatzberg had reported stock holdings in Corcept worth "over $100,000," when, in fact, the psychiatrist's stake exceeded $6 million. In July, Stanford said that Schatzberg "appropriately disclosed any potential financial conflict of interest," but announced he would nevertheless step down temporarily as principal investigator on his National Institute of Mental Health grant to study the effectiveness of the abortion drug mifepristone as an antidepressant. Grassley also asked Stanford to explain its own financial ties with Corcept, saying the university held licensing agreements for mifepristone. The National Institutes of Health later reinstated Schatzberg as principal investigator.

== Treatments ==
Prolonged exposure to cortisol can lead to a wide range of sometimes life-threatening conditions, including Cushing's syndrome, antipsychotic drug-induced weight gain, diabetes, obesity, hypertension, Alzheimer's disease, posttraumatic stress disorder, alcoholism, prostate, breast and ovarian cancer. Corcept Therapeutics has developed over 300 proprietary molecules, which it investigates in collaboration with outside researchers to determine if they can mitigate the effects of excess cortisol.

=== Korlym ===
In 2012, Corcept launched the prescription medicine Korlym, a cortisol receptor blocker to control hyperglycemia (high blood sugar) in adult patients with endogenous Cushing's syndrome who have type 2 diabetes or glucose intolerance and have failed surgery or are not candidates for surgery. Korlym was the first FDA-approved oral therapy for the treatment of such patients. Since Korlym was an orphan drug—i.e., one developed specifically to treat a rare medical condition—Corcept received seven years of exclusive marketing rights, as well as tax credits for clinical trial costs, marketing application filing fee waivers, and assistance from the FDA in the drug development process. In 2013, Corcept reported $19.7 million in federal tax credits. Corcept's marketing exclusivity for Korlym ended on February 17, 2019. As of 2018, Korlym is Corcept's only product and treats about 1,000 patients annually in the U.S.

Korlym's active ingredient is mifepristone, also known as RU-486, which is a medication typically used in combination with misoprostol to bring about an abortion. Developed in France in 1980, mifepristone was approved by the FDA in 2000 for abortion in the U.S. Since then, mifepristone has been marketed by Danco Laboratories, a private pharmaceutical distributor, under the brand name Mifeprex, and is Danco's only product.

In 2018, Kaiser Health News reported that the difference in price between Danco's Mifeprex and Corcept's Korlym "is striking, even though the ingredients are the same: One 200-milligram pill to prompt an abortion costs about $80. In contrast, a 300-milligram pill prescribed for Cushing's runs about $550 before discounts. Patients wanting an abortion take only one pill. People with Cushing's often take up to three pills a day for months or years." While the price of Mifeprex has remained stable, the price for Korlym has increased nearly 150 percent over the past six years, rising to an average yearly cost per patient of $180,000. "We have an expensive drug," said Corcept's CEO Joseph K. Belanoff, MD. "There's no getting around that."

In 2017, Corcept's revenue nearly doubled to $159.2 million, and executives expect to reach $275 million to $300 million in 2018. In January 2018, Corcept's stock price rose 27.4 percent. Executives say revenue from Korlym, which cost about $300 million to develop, has paid for development of new drugs. By December 2016, Corcept had discovered three structurally distinct series of selective cortisol modulators that, unlike mifepristone, do not terminate pregnancy. In March 2018, Corcept reported an encouraging phase II clinical trial update on relacorilant, a possible successor to Korlym that could treat Cushing's syndrome without the side effects of endometrial thickening and vaginal bleeding experienced by some women.

Warning. Since each tablet for oral use contains 300 mg of mifepristone, Korlym should never be taken by women who are pregnant or who might become pregnant. Taking Korlym during pregnancy will result in the loss of a pregnancy.

=== Oncology ===
In December 2013, the company announced plans to extend its development program for glucocorticoid receptor (GR) antagonists into oncology, and licensed patent rights from the University of Chicago's Center for Technology Development & Ventures covering the use of GR antagonists in combination with chemotherapy in the treatment of breast cancer.
