= Visual Effects Society Award for Outstanding Effects Simulations in an Episode, Commercial, or Real-Time Project =

Annual US television award

The Visual Effects Society Award for Outstanding Effects Simulations in an Episode, Commercial, or Real-Time Project is one of the annual awards given by the Visual Effects Society, starting in 2012. It is awarded to visual effects artists for their work in effects simulations.

== Winners & Nominees ==
=== 2010s ===
Outstanding FX and Simulation Animation in a Commercial or Broadcast Program

Year	Project	Episode(s)	Nominees	Network
2012	Guinness: Cloud		Tom Bussell, Neil Davies	
2012	Last Resort	"Captain"	Matt Von Brock, Bruce Coy, Junaid Farooq, Aldo Ruggiero	ABC
2012	Nike: Biomorph		Aladino Debert, Eric Ebling, Ken Mitchel Jones	
2012	Nissan Altima: Wouldn't It Be Cool		Dale Fay, Laura Jones Turner, Nathan Matsuda, Andrew Orloff	
2013	PETA: 98% Human		Vincent Baertsoen, Jimmy Gass, Dave Barosin	
2013	PlayStation: Perfect Day		Joji Tsuruga, Gavin Wellsman, Nick Couret, Hassan Taimur	
2013	Toyota Avalon: Perfect Day		Ed Laag, Eugene Gauran, Josh Hatton	
2013	Toy Story of Terror!		Paul Aichele, Kiki Mei Kee Poh, Andrew Coats	ABC

Outstanding Effects Simulations in a Commercial, Broadcast Program, or Video Game

Year	Program	Episode(s)	Nominees	Network
2014	Cosmos: A Spacetime Odyssey		Dominique Vidal, Isabelle Perin-Leduc, Sandrine Lurde, Alexandre Lerouge	Fox
2014	DirecTV		Jeffrey Dates, Jimmy Gass, Iwan Zwarts, Ryan Coster	
2014	SSE: Maya		Alex Hammond, Peter Agg, Sam Driscoll, Jimmy Gass	
2014	Vikings	"Invasion" (Storm Sequence)	Jeremy Dineen, Eric Lacroix, Kyle Yoneda, Norman Ran	History

Outstanding Effects Simulations in an Episode, Commercial, or Real-Time Project

Year	Program	Episode(s)	Nominees	Network
2015	Game of Thrones	"Hardhome"	David Ramos, Antonio Lado, Piotr Weiss, Félix Bergés	HBO
2015	Halo 5: The Hunt Begins		Vladislav Tushevskiy, Tomas Zaveckas, Sho Hasegawa, Sergey Kosarev	
2015	Lipton: The Revolution in Tea		Jonathan Westley, Tom Raynor, Christos Parliaros	
2015	SSE: Pier		Peter Agg, Sam Driscoll, Matthew Fuller	
2016	Game of Thrones	"Battle of the Bastards" (Meereen City)	Thomas Hullin, Dominik Kirouac, James Dong, Xavier Fourmond	HBO
2016	Game of Thrones	"Battle of the Bastards"	Kevin Blom, Sasmit Ranadive, Wanghua Huang, Benjamin Andersen	HBO
2016	John Lewis: Buster the Boxer		Diarmid Harrison-Murray, Tushar Kewlani, Radu Ciubotariu, Ben Thomas	
2016	Sky: Q		Michael Hunault, Gareth Bell, Paul Donnellan, Josh Curtis	
2017	Game of Thrones	"The Dragon and the Wolf" (Wall Destruction)	Thomas Hullin, Dominik Kirouac, Sylvain Nouveau, Nathan Arbuckle	HBO
2017	Game of Thrones	"Beyond the Wall" (Frozen Lake)	Manuel Ramírez, Oscar Marquez Chicharro, Pablo Hernández-Meléndez, David Gacituaga	HBO
2017	Heineken: The Trailblazers		Christian Bohm, Andreu Lucio Archs, Carsten Keller, Steve Oakley	
2017	Outlander	"Eye of the Storm" (Stormy Seas)	Jason Mortimer, Navin Pinto, Greg Teegarden, Steven Ong	Starz
2018	Altered Carbon		Philipp Kratzer, Daniel Fernandez, Xavier Lestourneaud, Andrea Rosa	Netflix
2018	Lost in Space (The Getaway)		Juri Bryan, Will Elsdale, Hugo Medda, Maxime Marline	Netflix
2018	Lost in Space	"Impact" (Jupiter is Falling)	Denys Shchukin, Heribert Raab, Michael Billette, Jaclyn Stauber	Netflix
2018	The Man in the High Castle	"Jahr Null" (Statue of Liberty Destruction)	Saber Jlassi, Igor Zanic, Nick Chamberlain, Christopher Parks	Amazon
2019	Stranger Things	"Chapter Six: E Pluribus Unum" (Melting Tom/Bruce)	Nathan Arbuckle, Christian Gaumond, James Dong, Aleksandr Starkov	Netflix
2019	Game of Thrones	"The Bells"	Marcel Kern, Paul Fuller, Ryo Sakaguchi, Thomas Hartmann	HBO
2019	Hennessy XO: The Seven Worlds		Selcuk Ergen, Radu Ciubotariu, Andreu Lucio Archs, Vincent Ullmann	
2019	Lost in Space	"Precipice" (Water Planet)	Juri Bryan, Hugo Medda, Kristian Olsson, John Perrigo	Netflix
2019	The Mandalorian	"Chapter 2: The Child" (Mud Horn)	Xavier Martin, Ian Baxter, Fabio Siino, Andrea Rosa	Disney+

=== 2020s ===
Year	Program	Episode(s)	Nominees	Network/Distributor
2020	Lovecraft Country	"Strange Case" (Chrysalis)	Federica Foresti, Johan Gabrielsson, Hugo Medda, Andreas Krieg	HBO
2020	PlayStation: "Play Has No Limits"		Tom Raynor, Andreu Lucio, Martin Aufinger, Platon Filimonov	Sony
2020	The Mandalorian	"Chapter 9: The Marshal" (Krayt Dragon)	HuaiYuan Teh, Don Wong, Mathieu Chardonnet, Prashanth Bhagavan	Disney+
2020	Tales from the Loop (Loretta's House)		Dominik Kirouac, Gaël Chopin, Sylvain Nouveau, Laurent Pancaccini	Amazon
2021	Foundation (Collapse of the Galactic Empire)		Giovanni Casadei, Mikel Zuloaga, Steven Moor, Louis Manjarres	Apple TV+
2021	Loki	"Journey Into Mystery"	Alioth Cloud, George Kuruvilla, Menno Dijkstra, Matthew Hanger, Jiyong Shin	Disney+
2021	The Nevers		David Stopford, Michele Stocco, Mike Hsu, Justin Mitchell	HBO
2021	WandaVision	All-New Halloween Spooktacular! (Vision's Destruction)	Sylvain Nouveau, Hakim Harrouche, Omar Meradi, Laurent Meste	Disney+
2022	The Lord of the Rings: The Rings of Power (Water and Magma)	"Udûn"	Rick Hankins, Aron Bonar, Branko Grujcic, Laurent Kermel	Amazon Prime Video
2022	Guillermo del Toro's Cabinet of Curiosities	"Graveyard Rats"	Amit Khanna, Oleg Memukhin, Mario Marengo, Josh George	Netflix
2022	Stranger Things 4 (Hawkins Destructive Fissures)		Ahmad Ghourab, Gavin Templer, Rachel Ajorque, Eri Ohno	Netflix
2022	The Lord of the Rings: The Rings of Power (Volcano Destruction)	"Udûn"	Kurt Debens, Hamish Bell, Robert Kelly, Gabriel Roccisano	Amazon Prime Video

== Programs with multiple awards ==
3 awards

- Game of Thrones (HBO)

== Programs with multiple nominations ==
6 nominations

- Game of Thrones (HBO)

3 nominations

- Lost in Space (Netflix)

2 nominations

- The Mandalorian (Disney+)
