= J. D. Schwalm =

American special effects artist

- Occupation: Special effects artist

J. D. Schwalm is an American special effects artist. He won an Academy Award in the category Best Visual Effects for the film First Man.

== Selected filmography ==
- First Man (2018; co-won with Paul Lambert, Ian Hunter and Tristan Myles)
