= 7th Visual Effects Society Awards =

US film and TV awards ceremony in 2009

- Date: February 10, 2009

Highlights
- Best Visual Effects in a Visual Effects Driven Motion Picture: The Curious Case of Benjamin Button

The 7th Visual Effects Society Awards, given in Los Angeles on February 21, 2009, at the Century Plaza Hotel, honored the best visual effects in film and television of 2008. The awards were later broadcast, in an edited form, on the Starz Edge Network on May 9, 2009.

== Winners and nominees ==
(Winners in bold)

=== Honorary Awards ===
Lifetime Achievement Award:

- **Kathleen Kennedy and Frank Marshall**

George Melies Award for Pioneering:

- **Phil Tippett**

=== Film ===
| Outstanding Visual Effects in a Visual Effects-Driven Feature Motion Picture | Outstanding Supporting Visual Effects in a Feature Motion Picture |
|---|---|
| **The Curious Case of Benjamin Button** – Eric Barba, Edson Williams, Nathan McGuinness, Lisa Beroud: The Chronicles of Narnia: Prince Caspian – Wendy Rogers, Dean Wright, Andrew Fowler, Greg Butler; Cloverfield – Kevin Blank, Chantal Feghali, Michael Ellis, Eric Leven; Hellboy II: The Golden Army – Michael J. Wassel, Lucy Killick, Adrian de Wet, Eamonn Butler; Iron Man – Ben Snow, Hal Hickel, Victoria Alonso, John Nelson | **Changeling** – Michael Owens, Geoffrey Hancock, Jinnie Pak, Dennis Hoffman: Eagle Eye – Jim Rygiel, Jim Berney, Crys Forsythe-Smith, David Smith; Nim's Island – Camille Cellucci, Scott Gordon, Fred Pienkos, James Straus; Synecdoche, New York – Mark Russell, Richard Friedlander, Eric Robertson, Brett Miller; Valkyrie – Richard R. Hoover, Maricel Pagulayan, Peter Nofz, Daniel Eaton |
| Outstanding Animation in an Animated Feature Motion Picture | Best Single Visual Effect of the Year |
| **WALL-E** – Andrew Stanton, Jim Morris, Lindsey Collins, Nigel Hardwidge: Bolt - The Chase – Chris Williams, Byron Howard, John Murrah, Doug Bennett; Kung Fu Panda – Everybody was Kung Fu Fighting: The Animation of Kung Fu Panda – Markus Manninen, Dan Wagner, Alex Parkinson, Raymond Zibach; Roadside Romeo – Pankaj Khandpur, Sherry Bharda, Shrirang Sathayem Suhael Merchant; Waltz With Bashir – Yoni Goodman, Yael Nahlieli | **The Curious Case of Benjamin Button** - Benjamin's Secret – Eric Barba, Lisa Beroud, Steve Preeg, Jonathan Litt: Cloverfield - Statue of Liberty Crash and Woolworth Tower Collapse – Michael Ellis, Chantal Feghali, David Vickery, Ben Taylor; The Day The Earth Stood Still - Newborn Klaatu – Jeffrey A. Okun, R. Christopher White, Thomas M. Boland, Ben Thompson; Indiana Jones and the Kingdom of the Crystal Skull - Valley Destruction – Stephanie Hornish, Pablo Helman, Jeff White, Craig Hammack; Iron Man – Ben Snow, Wayne Billheimer, Victoria Alonso, John Nelson |
| Outstanding Animated Character in a Live Action Feature Motion Picture | Outstanding Animated Character in an Animated Feature Motion Picture |
| **The Curious Case of Benjamin Button** - Benjamin Button – Steve Preeg, Matthias Wittmann, Tom St. Amand, David McLean: Hellboy II: The Golden Army - Elemental Sequence – Colin McEvoy, Christoph Ammann; Iron Man – Hal Hickel, Bruce Holcomb, James Tooley, John Walker; The Spiderwick Chronicles - Hogsqueal – Todd Labonte, Michael Brunet, Nathan Fredenburg, Aharon Bourland | **WALL-E** – Wall-E and Eve Truck Sequence – Ben Burtt, Victor Navone, Austin Lee, Jay Shuster: Bolt - Bolt – Becky Bresee, Bob Davies, Renato Dos Anjos, Wayne Unten Jr.; Bolt - Rhino – Adam Dykstra, Dave Gottlieb, Clay Kaytis, Hyrum Osmond; Kung Fu Panda - Po – Jack Black, Dan Wagner, Nico Marlet, Peter Farson |
| Outstanding Effects Animation in an Animated Feature | Outstanding Matte Paintings in a Feature Motion Picture |
| **Wall-E** - Effects in WALL-E – Jason Johnston, Keith Daniel Klohn, Enrique Vila, Bill Watral: Bolt -Various Sequences – John Murrah, Michael Kaschalk, Dale Mayeda, Adolph Lusinsky; Madagascar: Escape 2 Africa - Effects in Africa – Scott Peterson, Laurent Kermel, Andrew Wheeler, Greg Gladstone | **Changeling** - 1928 Downtown L.A. – Romain Bayle, Abel Milanes, Allan Lee, Debor Dunphy: Indiana Jones and the Kingdom of the Crystal Skull – Richard Bluff, Barry Williams, Yannick Dusseault, Yusei Uesugi; Speed Racer - Overall Matte Painting Presentation – Lubo Hristov, Dennis Martin, Ron Crabb; Synecdoche, New York - Matte Paintings – Brett Miller, Garrett Eaton, Matthew Conner |
| Outstanding Models and Miniatures in a Feature Motion Picture | Outstanding Created Environment in a Feature Motion Picture |
| **The Dark Knight - Garbage Truck Crash Models & Miniatures** – Ian Hunter, Forest Fischer, Scott Beverly, Adam Gelbart: Indiana Jones and the Kingdom of the Crystal Skull – David Fogler, Craig Hammack, Brian Gernand, Geoff Heron; Iron Man - Suit Up Machine – Aaron McBride, Russell Paul, Gerald Gutschmidt, Kenji Yamaguchi; My Darling of the Mountains - Hot Springs – Taro Kiba, Kenji Nagatani, Yuki Minagawa, Hideo Udo | **The Dark Knight** - IMAX Gotham City Scapes – Peter Bebb, David Vickery, Philippe Leprince, Andrew Lockley: Cloverfield - Brooklyn Bridge Sequence – David Vickery, Phil Johnson, Victor Wade, Sean Stranks; Indiana Jones and the Kingdom of the Crystal Skull - Temple Heart – Michael Halsted, David Fogler, Steve Walton, David Weitzberg; The Mummy: Tomb of the Dragon Emperor - Avalanche Sequence – Mike Meaker, Rich Mahon, Jason Iverson, Sho Hasegawa; Synecdoche, New York - Created Environment – Brett Miller, Garrett Eaton, Matthew Conner |
| Outstanding Compositing in a Feature Motion Picture | Outstanding Special Effects in a Feature Motion Picture |
| **The Curious Case of Benjamin Button** - Benjamin Comes Together – Janelle Croshaw, Paul Lambert, Sonja Burchard, Sarahjane Javelo: The Chronicles of Narnia: Prince Caspian – Stuart Lashley, Arundi Asregadoo, Mark Curtis, Richard Baker; Iron Man - Head Under Sisplay - HUD Compositing – Jonathan Rothbart, Dav Rauch, Kyle McCulloch, Kent Seki; Quantum of Solace - Siennna Chase and Fight Sequence – Anthony Smith, Christian Kaestner, Adrian Metzelaar, Jon Thum | **The Dark Knight - Overall** – Chris Corbould, Peter Notley, Ian Lowe Defiance (Special Effects) – Neil Corbould, Steven Warner, Anne Marie Walters, Alan Young |

=== Television ===
| Outstanding Visual Effects in a Broadcast Series | Outstanding Supporting Visual Effects in a Broadcast Program |
|---|---|
| **Battlestar Galactica - Season 4: BSG Space Battle**– Gary Hutzel, Michael Gibson, Doug Drexler, Kyle Toucher: Ghost Whisperer - Ghost in the Machine – Armen Kevorkian, Arthur J. Codron, Matt Scharf, Stefan Brederock; Heroes - The Second Coming – Eric Grenaudier, Mark Spatny, Diego Galtieri, Michael Cook; Sarah Connor Chronicles - Episode 108 – James Lima, Raoul Bolognini, Andrew Orloff, Steve Meyer | **Fringe - Episode 101 - Pilot** – Kevin Blank, Jay Worth, Andrew Orloff, Barbara Genicoff: Jericho - Episode 7 - Patriots & Tyrants – Andrew Orloff, Blythe Dalton, Chris Jones, Michael Cliett; Life - Frozen Solid – Max Ivins, Jenny Foster, Danny Kim, Shawn Lipowski; Pushing Daisies - The Legend of Merle McQuoddy – William Powloski, Elizabeth Castro, Melanie Tucker, Eric Chauvin |
| Outstanding Visual Effects in a Commercial | Outstanding Visual Effects in a Broadcast Miniseries, Movie or Special |
| **Bacardi - Sundance** – Alex Thiesen, Nikos Kalaitzidis, Jay Barton, Zsolt Krajcsik: Coke - It's Mine – Angus Kneale, Asher Edwards, Ben Smith, Dan Williams; FedEx - Pigeon – Satoko Iinuma, Murray Butler, David Hulin, Spencer Lueders; Monster - Stork – William Bartlett, Helen Stanley, Dan Seddon, David Mellor | **John Adams - Join or Die** – Steve Kullback, Eric Henry, Robert Stromberg, Jeff Goldman: Dr. Who - The Next Doctor - Cyber King – Dave Houghton, Marie Jones, Matt McKinney, Murray Barber; Generation Kill - Episode 2 – Adam McInnes, Anthony Bluff, Stephane Paris, David Sewell; Knight Rider - Prometheus – Sam Nicholson, Scott Ramsey, Chris Martin, Mike Enriquez |
| Outstanding Matte Paintings in a Broadcast Program or Commercial | Outstanding Models and Miniatures in a Broadcast Program or Commercial |
| **Doctor Who - Series 4 - Silence in the Library** – Simon Wickers, Charlie Bennett, Tim Barter, Arianna Lago: Generation Kill - Episode 2 – Christian Irles, Yannick Bourgie; Merlin Series 1 - The Mark of Nimueh – Dave Early, Simon Wickers, Bryan Bartlett. Sara Bennet | **New Balance - Anthem** – Ian Hunter, Jon Warren, Matt Burlingame, Raymond Moore |
| Outstanding Created Environment in a Broadcast Program or Commercial | Outstanding Compositing in a Broadcast Program or Commercial |
| **John Adams - Join or Die - Episode 1 - The Boston Harbor** – Paul Graff, Robert Stromberg, Adam Watkins: Audi - Living Room - Living Room – Jack Zaloga, Jake Montgomery, Andy Boyd, Sean Durnan; Heroes - Tokyo – Meliza Fermin, Michael Cook, Daniel Kumiega, Anthony Ocamp; Wrigley's - Fruit Shredder – Ludo Fealy, Dean Robinson, Adam Leary, Michael Gregory | **John Adams - Join or Die - Episode 1 - The Boston Harbor** – Paul Graff, Joshua LaCross, Matt Collorafice: Coke - It's Mine - Balloons – Angus Kneale, Dan Williams, Andrew Proctor; FedEx - PIGEON - Pigeon – Andy Walker, Spencer Lueders, Maryane Butler, Murray Butler; Time Sculpture – Richard de Carterert, Paul Downes, Oliver Dadswell, John Price |

=== Other categories ===
| Outstanding Real Time Visuals in a Video Game | Outstanding Pre-Rendered Visuals in a Video Game |
|---|---|
| **Crysis Warhead** – Zoltán Pócza, Gábor Mogyorósi, Tamás Schlägl: Dead Space – Ian Milham, Ben Wanat, Christopher Stone; Need for Speed: Undercover - Xbox 360 – Henry LaBounta, Steve Barcia, Dave Taylor, Carl Jarrett | **World of Warcraft: Wrath of the Lich King - Intro Cinematics** – Jeff Chamberlain, Phillip Hillenbrand: Command & Conquer: Red Alert 3 - Chrono Lab, Empire, and Allied Scenes – Richard Taylor, Benjamin Hopkins, KaTai Tang, Mical Pedriana; Need for Speed: Undercover - Cinematics – Henry LaBounta, Stave Barcia, Dave Taylor, Mark Raham |
| Outstanding Visual Effects in a Special Venue Project | Outstanding Effects in a Student Project |
| **U2 3D - Selected shots** – Peter Anderson, Jon Shapiro, David Franks, Jeremy Nicolaides: Grand Canyon Adventure: River at Risk - Main title sequence – Mark Freund, Alan Markowitz, Lee Nelson, Josh Mossotti | **Plastic - Transformation Sequence** – Sandy Widyanata, Courtney Wise: Hangar Number Five - Robot Attack – Nathan Matsuda; La Main Des Maitres - Revolution – Adrien CaYuS Toupet, Clement Delatre, Vivien Looky Chauvet |
