= 16th Visual Effects Society Awards =

2018 film and television awards event

16th Visual Effects Society Awards

February 13, 2018

Best Visual Effects in a Visual Effects Driven Motion Picture:
War for the Planet of the Apes

Best Visual Effects in a Photoreal Episode:
Game of Thrones – Beyond the Wall

The 16th Visual Effects Society Awards was held in Los Angeles at the Beverly Hilton Hotel on February 13, 2018, in honor to the best visual effects in film and television of 2017.

== Winners and nominees ==
(winners in bold)

=== Honorary Awards ===
Lifetime Achievement Award:

- **Jon Favreau**

VES Georges Méliès Award

- **Joe Letteri**

=== Film ===
Outstanding Visual Effects in a Photoreal Feature	Outstanding Supporting Visual Effects in a Photoreal Feature
**War for the Planet of the Apes** – Joe Letteri, Ryan Stafford, Daniel Barrett, Dan Lemmon, Joel Whist: Blade Runner 2049 – John Nelson, Karen Murphy Mundell, Paul Lambert, Richard Hoover, Gerd Nefzer; Guardians of the Galaxy Vol. 2 – Christopher Townsend, Damien Carr, Guy Williams, Jonathan Fawkner, Dan Sudick; Kong: Skull Island – Jeff White, Tom Peitzman, Stephen Rosenbaum, Scott Benza, Michael Meinardus; Star Wars: The Last Jedi – Ben Morris, Tim Keene, Eddie Pasquarello, Daniel Seddon, Chris Corbould	**Dunkirk** – Andrew Jackson, Mike Chambers, Andrew Lockley, Alison Wortman, Scott Fisher: Darkest Hour – Stephane Naze, Warwick Hewitt, Guillaume Terrien, Benjamin Magana; Downsizing – James E. Price, Susan MacLeod, Lindy De Quattro, Stéphane Nazé; Mother! – Dan Schrecker, Colleen Bachman, Ben Snow, Wayne Billheimer, Peter Chesney; Only the Brave – Eric Barba, Dione Wood, Matthew Lane, Georg Kaltenbrunner, Michael Meinardus
Outstanding Visual Effects in an Animated Feature	Outstanding Animated Character in a Photoreal Feature
**Coco** – Lee Unkrich, Darla K. Anderson, David Ryu, Michael K. O'Brien: Captain Underpants – David Soren, Mark Swift, Mireille Soria, David Dulac; Cars 3 – Brian Fee, Kevin Reher, Michael Fong, Jon Reisch; Despicable Me 3 – Pierre Coffin, Chris Meledandri, Kyle Balda, Eric Guillon; The Lego Batman Movie – Rob Coleman, Amber Naismith, Grant Freckelton, Damien Gray; The Lego Ninjago Movie – Gregory Jowle, Fiona Childton, Miles Green, Kim Taylor	**War for the Planet of the Apes – Caesar** – Dennis Yoo, Ludovic Chailloleau, Douglas McHale, Tim Forbes: Blade Runner 2049 – Rachael – Axel Akkeson, Stefano Carter, Wesley Chandler, Ian Cooke-Grimes; Kong: Skull Island – Kong – Jakub Pistecky, Chris Havreberg, Karin Cooper, Kris Costa; War for the Planet of the Apes – Bad Ape – Eteuati Tema, Aidan Martin, Florian Fernandez, Mathias Larserud
Outstanding Animated Character in an Animated Feature	Outstanding Created Environment in a Photoreal Feature
**Coco – Hèctor** – Emron Grover, Jonathan Hoffman, Michael Honsel, Guilherme Sauerbronn Jacinto: Despicable Me 3 – Bratt – Eric Guillon, Bruno Dequier, Julien Soret, Benjamin Fournet; The Boss Baby – Boss Baby – Alec Baldwin, Carlos Puertolas, Rani Naamani, Joe Moshier; The Lego Ninjago Movie – Garmadon – Matthew Everitt, Christian So, Loic Miermont, Fiona Darwin; The Lego Ninjago Movie – Garma Mecha Man – Arthur Terzis, Wei Hei, Jean-Marc Ariu, Gibson Radsavanh	**Blade Runner 2049 – Los Angeles** – Chris McLaughlin, Ryan Salcombe, Seungjin Woo, Francesco Dell'Anna: Blade Runner 2049 – Trash Mesa – Didier Muanza, Thomas Gillet, Guillaume Mainville, Sylvain Lorgeau; Blade Runner 2049 – Vegas – Eric Noel, Arnaud Saibron, Adam Goldstein, Pascal Clement; War for the Planet of the Apes – Hidden Fortress – Greg Notzelman, James Shaw, Jay Renner, Gak Gyu Choi; War for the Planet of the Apes – Prison Camp – Phillip Leonhardt, Paul Harris, Jeremy Fort, Thomas Lo
Outstanding Created Environment in an Animated Feature	Outstanding Virtual Cinematography in a Photoreal Project
**Coco – City of the Dead** – Michael Frederickson, Jamie Hecker, Jonathan Pytko, Dave Strick: Cars 3 – Abandoned Racetrack – Marlena Fecho, Thidartana Annee Jonjai, Jose L. Ramos Serrano, Frank Tai; Despicable Me 3 – Hollywood Destruction – Axelle De Cooman, Pierre Lopes, Milo Riccarand, Nicolas Brack; The Lego Ninjago Movie – Ninjago City – Kim Taylor, Angela Ensele, Felicity Coonan, Jean Pascal leBlanc	**Guardians of the Galaxy Vol. 2** – Groot Dance/Opening Fight – James Baker, Steven Lo, Alvise Avati, Robert Stipp: Beauty and the Beast – Be Our Guest – Shannon Justison, Casey Schatz, Neil Weatherley, Claire Michaud; Star Wars: The Last Jedi – Crait Surface Battle – Cameron Nielsen, Albert Cheng, John Levin, Johanes Kurnia; Thor: Ragnarok – Valkyrie's Flashback – Hubert Maston, Arthur Moody, Adam Paschke, Casey Schatz
Outstanding Model in a Photoreal or Animated Project	Outstanding Effects Simulations in a Photoreal Feature
**Blade Runner 2049 – LAPD Headquarters** – Alex Funke, Steven Saunders, Joaquin Loyzaga, Chris Menges: Despicable Me 3 – Dru's Car – Eric Guillon, Francois-Xavier Lepeintre, Guillaume Boudeville, Pierre Lopes; Life – The ISS – Tom Edwards, Chaitanya Kshirsagar, Satish Kuttan, Paresh Dodia; US Marines Anthem; Monument – Tom Bardwell, Paul Liaw, Adam Dewirst	**War for the Planet of the Apes** – David Caeiro Cebrian, Johnathan Nixon, Chet Leavai, Gary Boyle: Kong: Skull Island – Florent Andorra, Alexis Hall, Raul Essig, Branko Grujcic; Only the Brave – Fire & Smoke – Georg Kaltenbrunner, Thomas Bevan, Philipp Zaufel, Himanshu Joshi; Star Wars: The Last Jedi – Bombing Run – Peter Kyme, Miguel Perez Senet, Ahmed Gharraph, Billy Copley; Star Wars: The Last Jedi – Mega Destroyer Destruction – Mihai Cioroba, Ryoji Fujita, Jiyong Shin, Dan Finnegan
Outstanding Effects Simulations in an Animated Feature	Outstanding Compositing in a Photoreal Feature
**Coco** – Kristopher Campbell, Stephen Gustafson, Dave Hale, Keith Klohn: Cars 3 – Greg Gladstone, Stephen Marshall, Leon JeongWook Park, Tim Speltz; Despicable Me 3 – Bruno Chauffard, Frank Baradat, Milo Riccarand, Nicolas Brack; Ferdinand – Yaron Canetti, Allan Kadkoy, Danny Speck, Mark Adams; The Boss Baby – Mitul Patel, Gaurav Mathus, Venkatesh Kongathi	**War for the Planet of the Apes** – Christoph Salzmann, Robin Hollander, Ben Morgan, Ben Warner: Blade Runner 2049 – LAPD Approach and Joy Holograms – Tristan Myles, Miles Lauridsen, Joel Delle-Vergin, Farhad Mohasseb; Kong: Skull Island – Nelson Sepulveda, Aaron Brown, Paolo Acri, Shawn Mason; Thor: Ragnarok – Bridge Battle – Gavin McKenzie, David Simpson, Owen Carroll, Mark Gostlow

=== Television ===
Outstanding Visual Effects in a Photoreal Episode	Outstanding Supporting Visual Effects in a Photoreal Episode
**Game of Thrones –** "**Beyond the Wall**" – Joe Bauer, Steve Kulliback, Chris Baird, David Ramos, Sam Conway: Agents of S.H.I.E.L.D. – "Orientation: Part 1" – Mark Kolpack, Sabrina Arnold, David Rey, Kevin Yuille, Gary D'Amico; Legion – "Chapter 1" – John Ross, Eddie Bonin, Sebastian Bergeron, Lionel Lim, Paul Benjamin; Star Trek: Discovery – "The Vulcan Hello" – Jason Michael Zimmerman, Aleksandra Kochoska, Ante Dekovic, Mahmoud Rahnama; Stranger Things – "Chapter Nine: The Gate" – Paul Graff, Christina Graff, Seth Hill, Joel Sevilla, Caius the Man	**Black Sails –** "**XXIX**" – Erik Henry, Terron Pratt, Yafei Wu, David Wahlberg, Paul Dimmer: Fear the Walking Dead – "Sleigh Ride" – Peter Crosman, Denise Gayle, Philip Nussbaumer, Martin Pelletier, Frank Ludica; Mr. Robot – "eps3.4_runtime-error.r00" – Ariel Altman, Lauren Montuori, John Miller, Luciano DiGeronimo; Outlander – "Eye of the Storm" – Richard Briscoe, Elicia Bessette, Aladino Debert, Filip Orrby, Doug Hardy; Taboo – "Pilot" – Henry Badgett, Tracy McCreary, Nic Birmingham, Simon Rowe, Colin Gorry; Vikings – "On the Eve" – Dominic Remane, Mike Borrett, Ovidiu Cinazan, Paul Wishart, Paul Byrne
Outstanding Visual Effects in a Commercial	Outstanding Animated Character in an Episode or Real-Time Project
**Samsung – Do What you Can't; Ostrich** – Diarmid Harrison-Murray, Tomek Zietkiewicz, Amir Bazazi, Martino Madeddu: Beyond Good and Evil 2 – Leon Berelle, Maxime Luere, Dominique Boidin, Remi Kozyra; Kia Niro – Hero's Journey – Robert Sethi, Anastasia von Rahl, Tom Graham, Chris Knight, Dave Peterson; Mercedes-Benz – King of the Jungle – Simon French, Josh King, Alexia Paterson, Leonardo Costa; Monster – Opportunity Roars – Ruben Vanderbroek, Clairellen Walin, Kevin Ives, Kyle Cody	**Game of Thrones – The Spoils of War; Drogon Loot Train Attack** – Murray Stevenson, Jason Snyman, Jenn Taylor, Florian Friedmann: Black Mirror – Metalhead – Steven Godfrey, Stafford Lawrence, Andrew Robertson, Lestyn Roberts; Game of Thrones – Beyond the Wall; Zombie Polar Bear – Paul Story, Todd Labonte, Matthew Muntean, Nicholas Wilson; Game of Thrones – Eastwatch; Drogon Meets Jon – Jonathan Symmonds, Thomas Kutschera, Philipp Winterstein, Andreas Krieg
Outstanding Animated Character in a Commercial	Outstanding Created Environment in an Episode, Commercial, or Real-Time Project
**Samsung – Do What you Can't; Ostrich** – David Bryan, Maximilian Mallmann, Tim Van Hussen, Brendan Fagan: Beyond Good and Evil 2 – Zhou Yuzhu – Dominique Boidin, Maxime Luere, Leon Berelle, Remo Kozyra; Mercedes-Benz – King of the Jungle – Steve Townrow, Joseph Kane, Greg Martin, Gabriela Ruch Salmeron; Netto – The Easter Surprise; Bunny – Alberto Lara, Jorge Montiel, Anotine Mariez, Jon Wood	**Game of Thrones – Beyond the Wall; Frozen Lake** – Daniel Villalba, Antonio Lado, Jose Luis Barreiro, Isaac de la Pompa: Assassin's Creed Origins – City of Memphis – Patrick Limoges, Jean-Sebastien Guay, Mikael Guaveia, Vincent Lombardo; Game of Thrones – Eastwatch – Patrice Poissant, Deak Ferrand, Dominic Daigle, Gabriel Morin; Still Star-Crossed – City – Rafael Solorzano, Isaac de la Pompa, Jose Luis Barreiro, Oscar Perea; Stranger Things – Chapter Nine: The Gate – Saul Galbiati, Michael Maher, Seth Cobb, Kate McFadden
Outstanding Effects Simulations in an Episode, Commercial, or Real-Time Project	Outstanding Compositing in a Photoreal Episode
**Game of Thrones – The Dragon and the Wolf; Wall Destruction** – Thomas Hullin, Dominik Kirouac, Sylvain Nouveau, Nathan Arbuckle: Game of Thrones – Beyond the Wall; Frozen Lake – Manuel Ramirez, Oscar Marquez, Pablo Hernandez, David Gacituaga; Heineken – The Trailblazers – Christian Bohm, Andreu Lucio Archs, Carsten Keller, Steve Oakley; Outlander – Eye of the Storm; Stormy Seas – Jason Mortimer, Navin Pinto, Greg Teegarden, Steve Ong	**Game of Thrones – The Spoils of War; Loot Train Attack** – Dom Hellier, Thijs Noij, Edwin Holdsworth, Giacomo Matteucci: Game of Thrones – Beyond the Wall; Frozen Lake – Oscar Perea, Santiago Martos, David Esteve, Michael Crane; Game of Thrones – Eastwatch – Thomas Montminy Brodeur, Xavier Fourmond, Reyben Barkataki, Sebastien Raets; Star Trek: Discovery – Phil Prates, Rex Alerta, John Dinh, Karen Cheng
Outstanding Compositing in a Photoreal Commercial	
**Samsung – Do What you Can't; Ostrich** – Michael Gregory, Andrew Roberts, Gustavo Bellon, Rashabh Ramesh Butani: Destiny 2 – New Legends Will Rise – Alex Unruh, Michael Ralla, Helgi Laxdal; Nespresso – Comin' Home – Matt Pascuzzi, Steve Drew, Martin Lazaro, Karch Koon; Virgin Media – Delivering Awesome – Jonathan Westley, John Thornton, Milo Paterson, George Cressey	

=== Other categories ===
Outstanding Visual Effects in a Real-Time Project	Outstanding Visual Effects in a Special Venue Project
**Assassin's Creed Origins** – Raphael Lacoste, Patrick Limoges, Jean-Sebastien Guay, Ulrich Haar: Call of Duty: WWII – Joe Salud, Atsushi Seo, Danny Chan, Jeremy Kendall; Fortnite – A Hard Day's Night – Michael Clausen, Gavin Moran, Brian Brecht, Andrew Harris; Sonaria – Scot Stafford, Camille Cellucci, Kevin Dart, Theresa Latzko; Uncharted: The Lost Legacy – Shaun Escayg, Tate Mosesian, Eben Cook	**Avatar Flight of Passage** – Richard Baneham, Amy Jupiter, David Lester, Thrain Shadbolt: Corona: Paraiso Secreto – Adam Grint, Jarrad Vladich, Roberto Costas-Fernandez, Ed Thomas, Felipe Linares; Guardians of the Galaxy – Mission: Breakout! – Jason Bayever, Amy Jupiter, Mike Bain, Alexander Thomas; National Geographic Encounter: Ocean Odyssey – Thilo Ewers, John Owens, Gioele Cresce, Mariusz Wesierski; Nemo and Friends SeaRider – Anthony Apodaca, Kathy Janus, Brandon Benepe, Nick Lucas, Rich Rothschild; Star Wars: Secrets of the Empire – Ben Snow, Judah Graham, Ian Bowie, Curtis Hickman, David Layne
Outstanding Visual Effects in a Student Project	
**Hybrids** – Florian Brauch, Romain Thirion, Matthieu Pujol, Kim Tailhades: Creature Pinup – Christian Leitner, Juliane Walther, Kiril Mirkov, Lisa Ecker; Les Pionniers de I'Univsers – Clementine Courbin, Matthieu Guevel, Jerome Van Beneden, Anthony Rege; The Endless – Nicolas Lourme, Corentin Gravend, Edouard Calemard, Romaric Vivier	
