= 2025 Seattle Film Critics Society Awards =

American film awards

10th Seattle Film Critics Society Awards
- Date: December 15, 2025
- Site: Seattle, Washington

Highlights
- Best Picture: One Battle After Another
- Most awards: One Battle After Another (8)
- Most nominations: Sinners (14)

The 10th Seattle Film Critics Society Awards recognized the best in film of 2025. The winners were announced on December 15, 2025.

The nominations were announced on December 5, 2025. Ryan Coogler's period supernatural horror film Sinners led the nominations with a record-tying fourteen, becoming the film with the most nominations in a single year, matching Everything Everywhere All at Once (2022). Additional films with multiple nominations include the action thriller film One Battle After Another with twelve and the Pacific Northwest period drama film Train Dreams with eight.

The Seattle Film Critics Society previously announced the nominations for Best Pacific Northwest Feature Film on October 7; the nominees were all screened at the SIFF Film Center through October and November. Additionally, a Pacific Northwest Short Film Award was introduced. The John Hartl Pacific Northwest Spotlight Award was presented to filmmaker Sky Hopinka. Furthermore, the SFCS issued a "special citation" to recognize Indy the Dog's achievements in animal acting for Good Boy.

== Winners and nominees ==
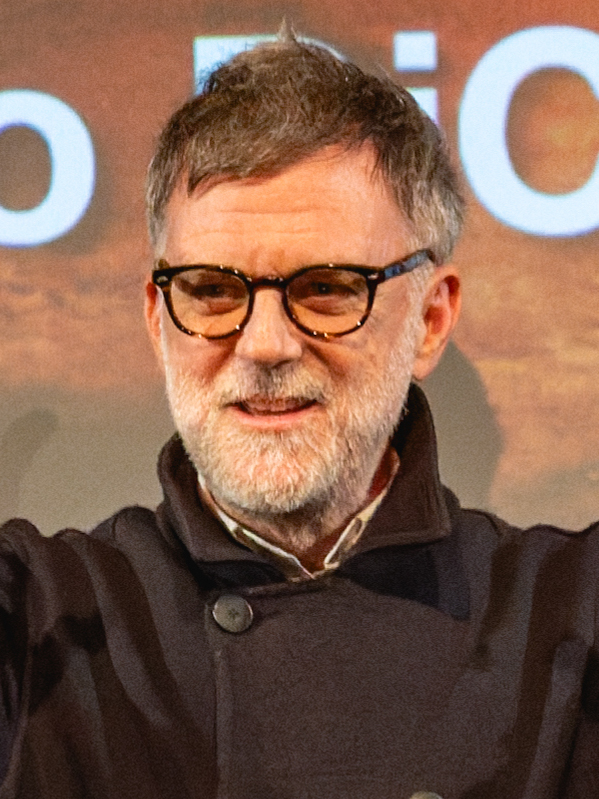
Paul Thomas Anderson, Best Director and Best Screenplay winner

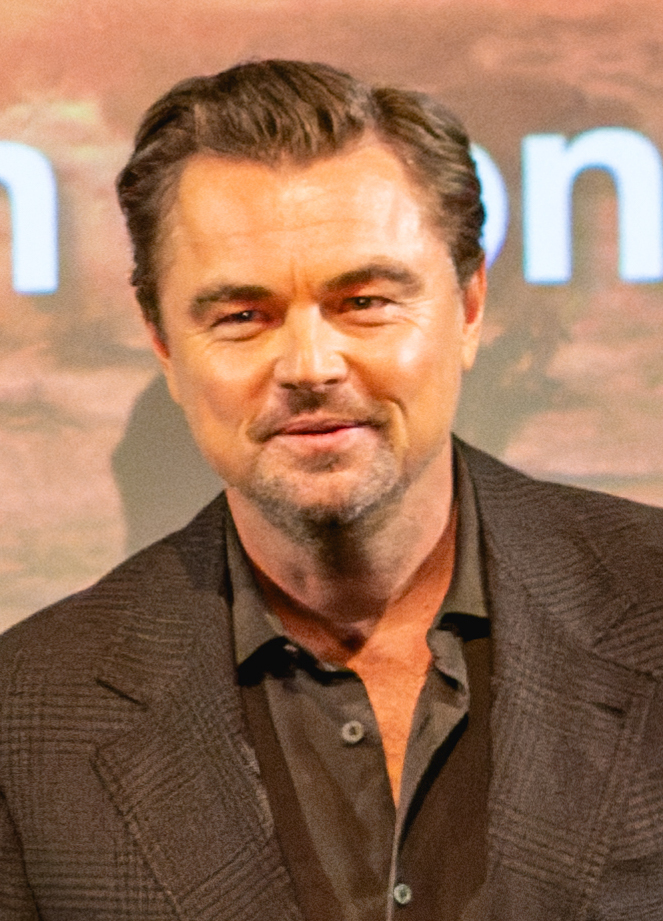
Leonardo DiCaprio, Best Actor in a Leading Role winner

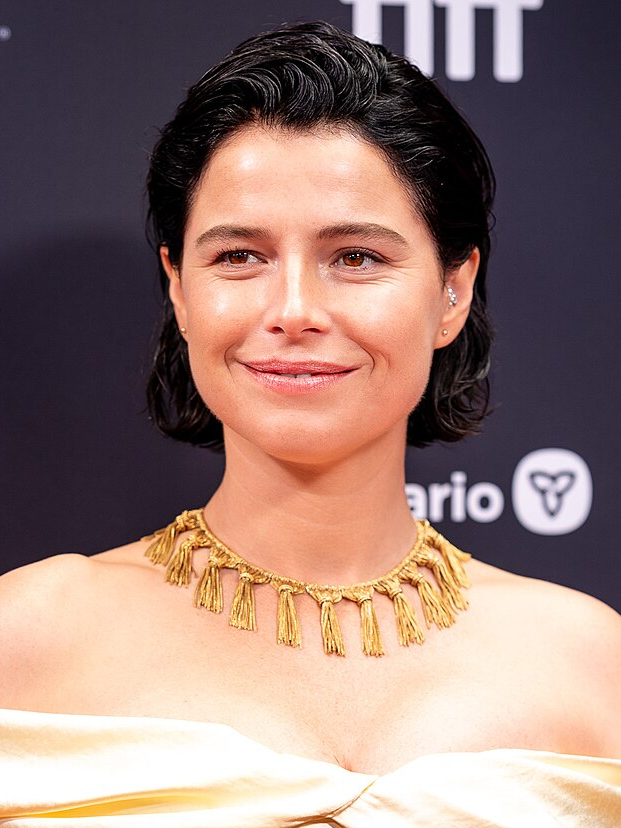
Jessie Buckley, Best Actress in a Leading Role winner

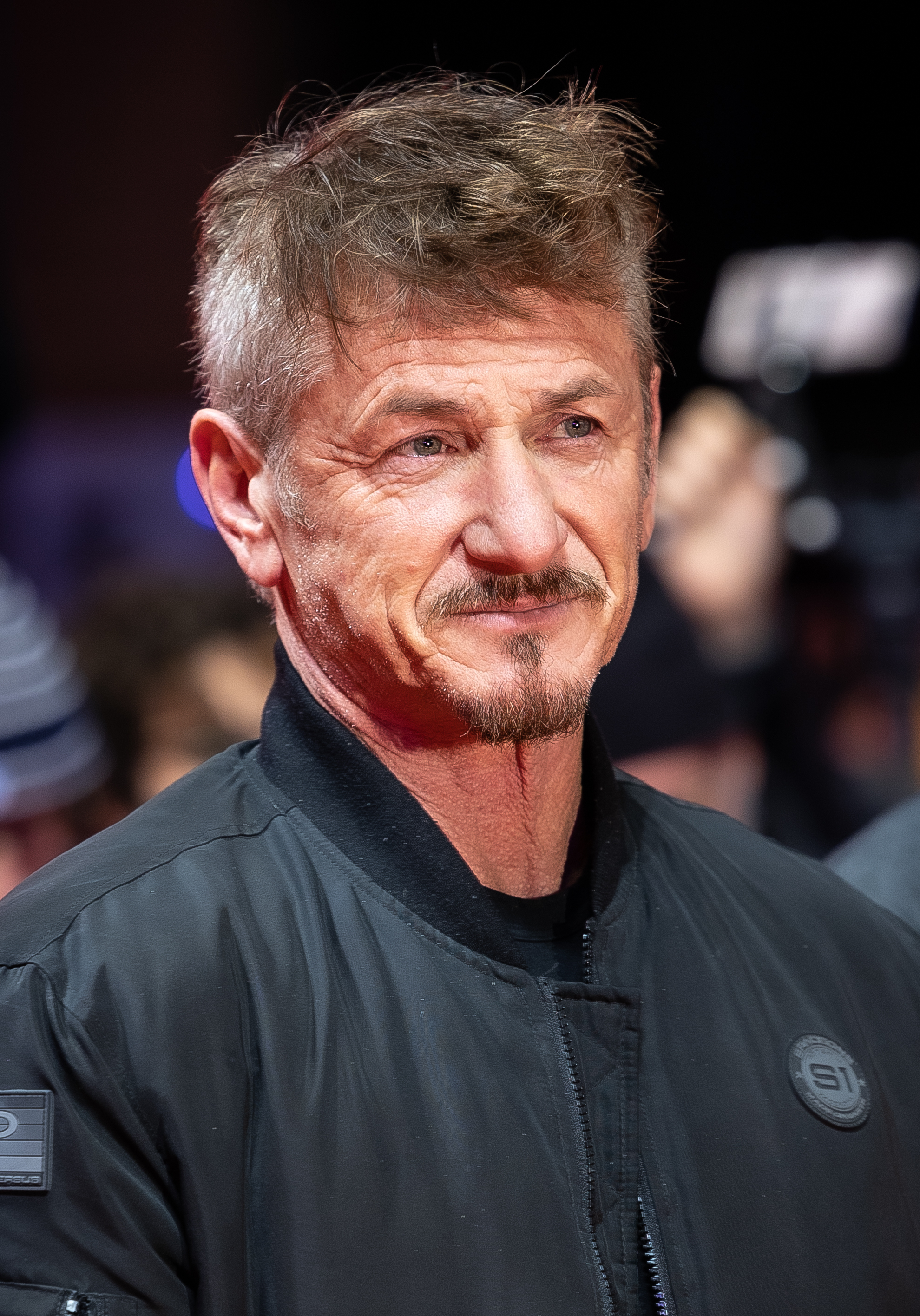
Sean Penn, Best Actor in a Supporting Role winner

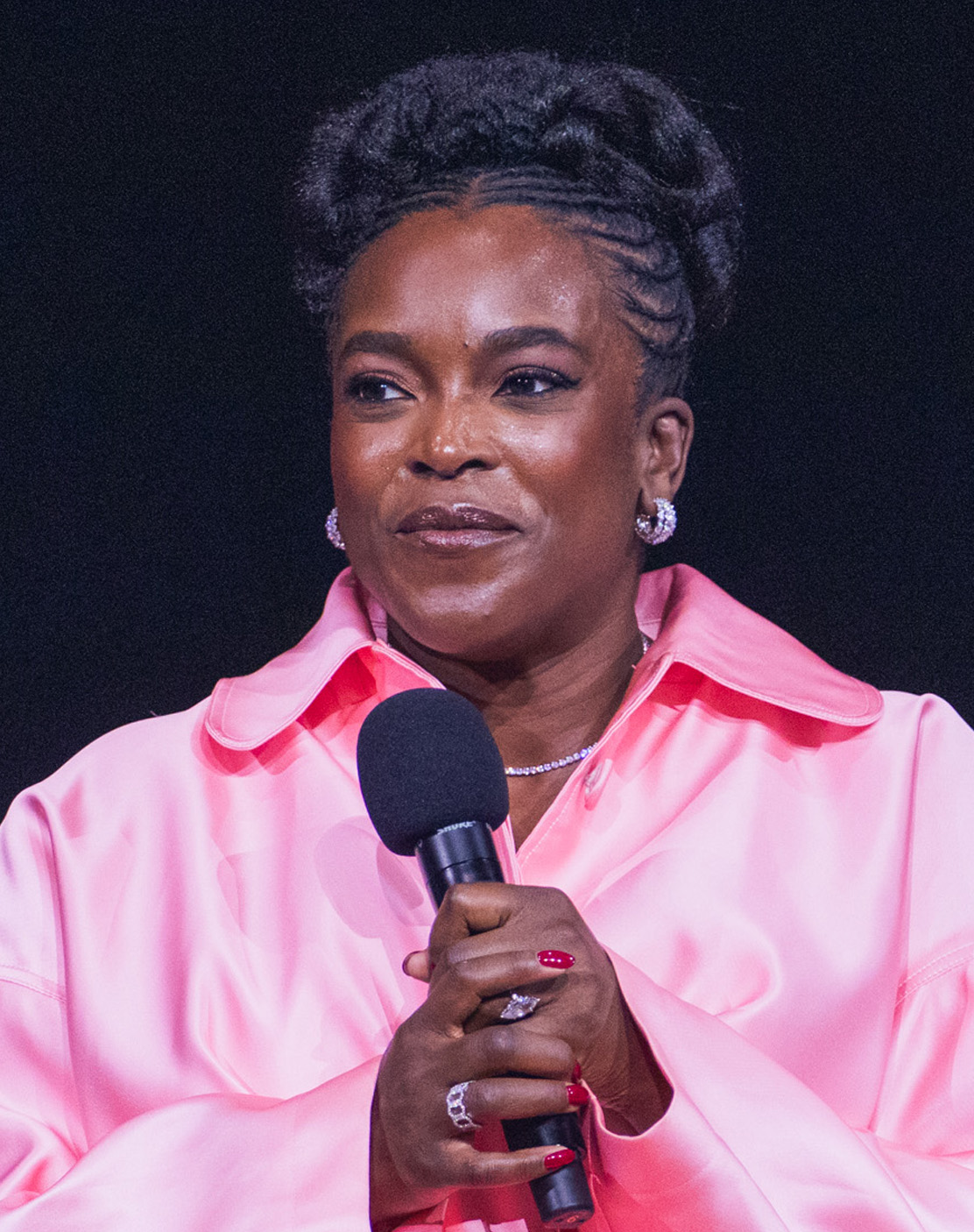
Wunmi Mosaku, Best Actress in a Supporting Role winner

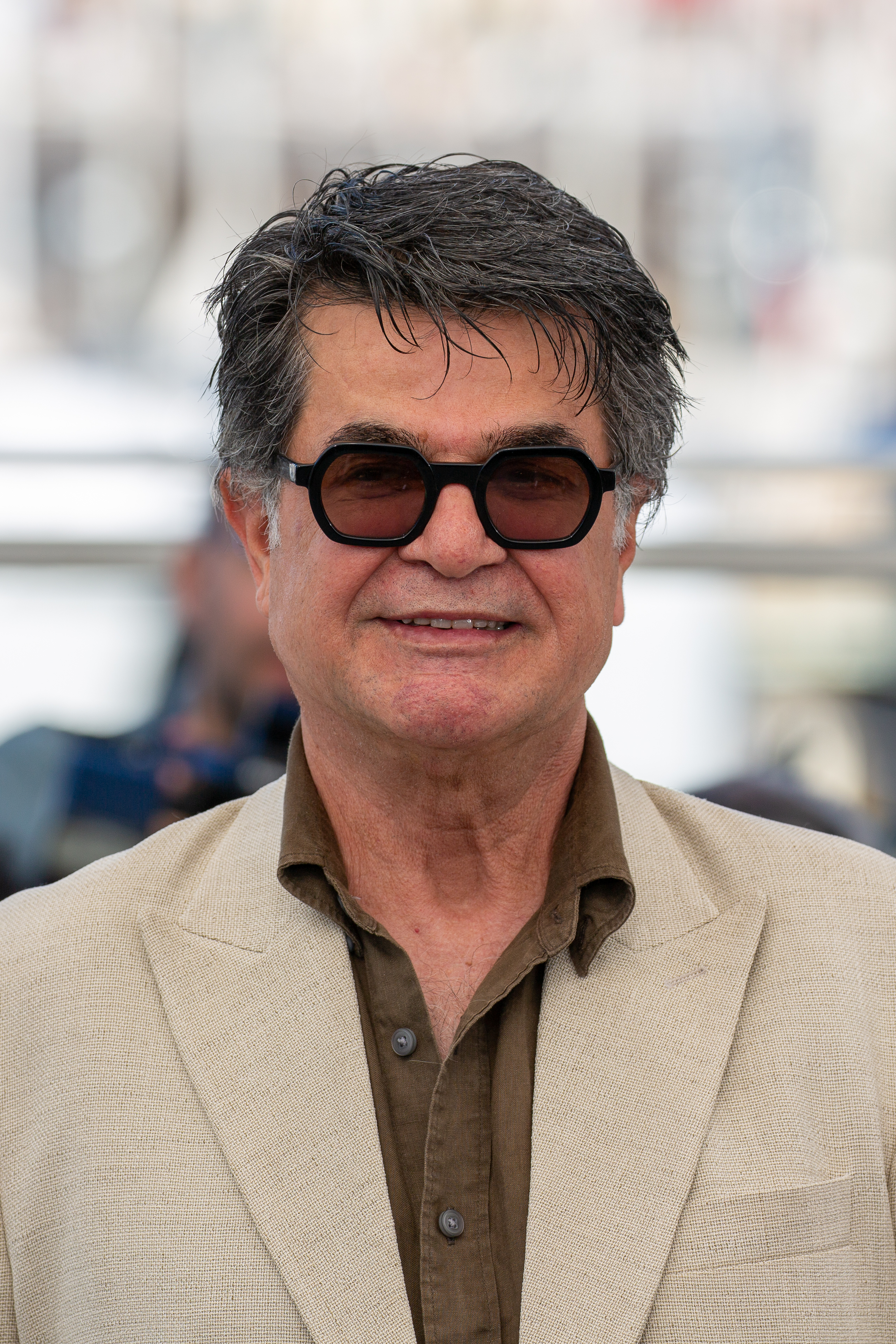
Jafar Panahi, Best International Film winner

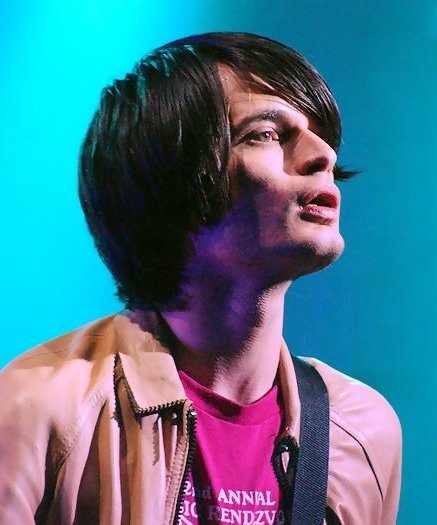
Jonny Greenwood, Best Original Score winner

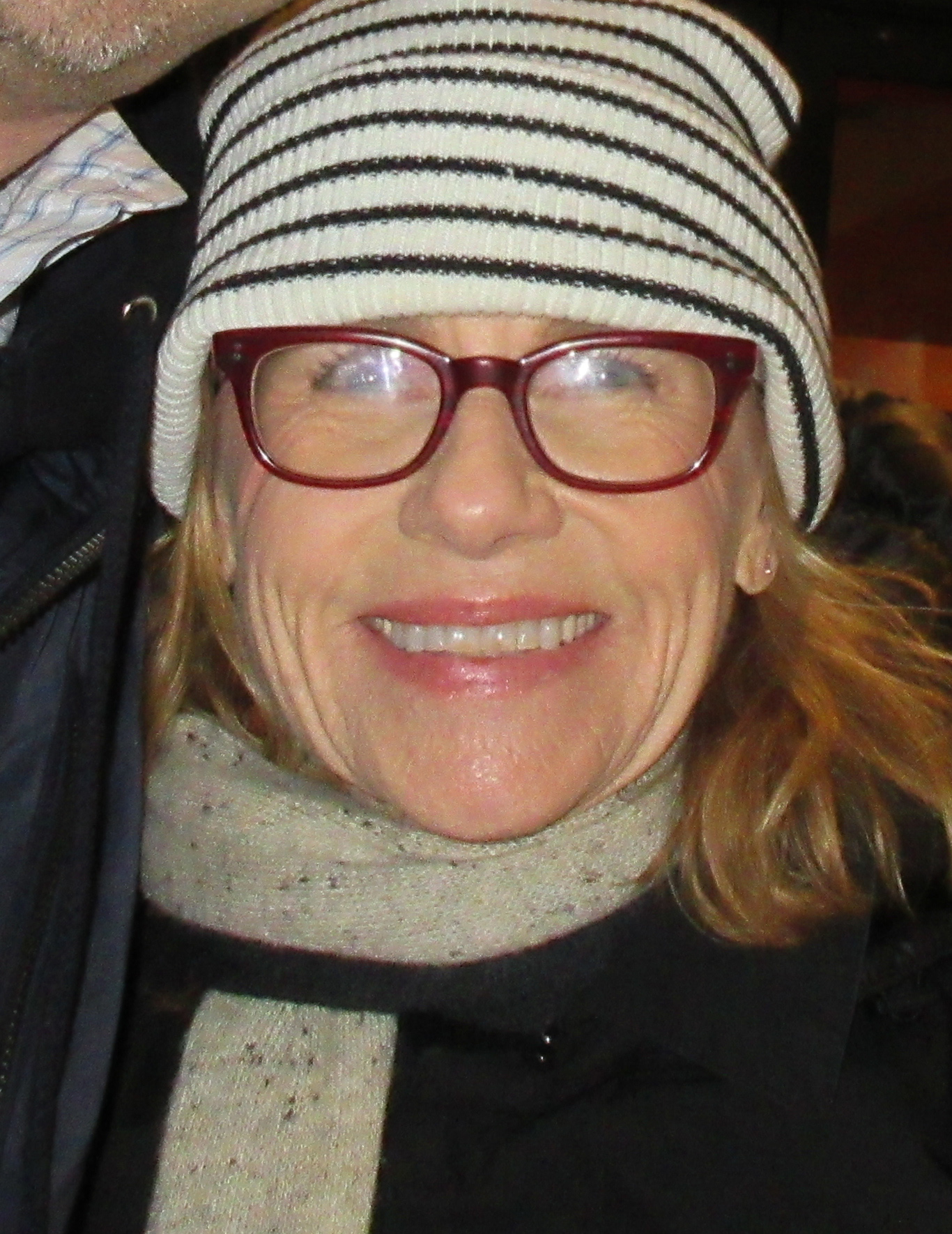
Amy Madigan, Villain of the Year winner

Winners are listed first and highlighted in bold.

**Best Picture**: **One Battle After Another**; Bugonia; Hamnet; It Was Just an Accident; Marty Supreme; Sentimental Value; Sinners; Sorry, Baby; Train Dreams; Weapons	**Best Director**: **Paul Thomas Anderson – One Battle After Another**; Clint Bentley – Train Dreams; Ryan Coogler – Sinners; Josh Safdie – Marty Supreme; Chloé Zhao – Hamnet
**Best Actor in a Leading Role**: **Leonardo DiCaprio – One Battle After Another as Bob Ferguson**; Timothée Chalamet – Marty Supreme as Marty Mauser; Joel Edgerton – Train Dreams as Robert Grainier; Ethan Hawke – Blue Moon as Lorenz Hart; Michael B. Jordan – Sinners as Elijah "Smoke" Moore / Elias "Stack" Moore	**Best Actress in a Leading Role**: **Jessie Buckley – Hamnet as Agnes Shakespeare**; Rose Byrne – If I Had Legs I'd Kick You as Linda; Amanda Seyfried – The Testament of Ann Lee as Ann Lee; Emma Stone – Bugonia as Michelle Fuller; Eva Victor – Sorry, Baby as Agnes
**Best Actor in a Supporting Role**: **Sean Penn – One Battle After Another as Col. Steven J. Lockjaw**; Benicio del Toro – One Battle After Another as Sensei Sergio St. Carlos; Jacob Elordi – Frankenstein as The Creature; David Jonsson – The Long Walk as Peter "Pete" McVries; William H. Macy – Train Dreams as Arn Peeples	**Best Actress in a Supporting Role**: **Wunmi Mosaku – Sinners as Annie**; Ariana Grande – Wicked: For Good as Galinda "Glinda" Upland; Inga Ibsdotter Lilleaas – Sentimental Value as Agnes Borg Pettersen; Amy Madigan – Weapons as Gladys; Teyana Taylor – One Battle After Another as Perfidia Beverly Hills
**Best Ensemble**: **One Battle After Another – Cassandra Kulukundis**; Eephus – Carson Lund; Marty Supreme – Jennifer Venditti; Sinners – Francine Maisler; Wake Up Dead Man: A Knives Out Story – Bret Howe and Mary Vernieu	**Best Action Choreography**: **Mission: Impossible – The Final Reckoning – Wade Eastwood**; Avatar: Fire and Ash – Garrett Warren, Steve Brown, and Stuart Thorp; Ballerina – Stephen Dunlevy and Jackson Spidell; Predator: Badlands – Jacob Tomuri; Sinners – Andy Gill
**Best Screenplay**: **One Battle After Another – Paul Thomas Anderson**; Marty Supreme – Ronald Bronstein and Josh Safdie; Sinners – Ryan Coogler; Sorry, Baby – Eva Victor; Train Dreams – Clint Bentley and Greg Kwedar	**Best Animated Film**: **KPop Demon Hunters – Maggie Kang and Chris Appelhans**; Arco – Ugo Bienvenu; The Colors Within – Naoko Yamada; Little Amélie or the Character of Rain – Maïlys Vallade and Liane-Cho Han; Zootopia 2 – Jared Bush and Byron Howard
**Best Documentary Film**: **WTO/99 – Ian Bell**; The Alabama Solution – Andrew Jarecki and Charlotte Kaufman; Come See Me in the Good Light – Ryan White; Pavements – Alex Ross Perry; The Perfect Neighbor – Geeta Gandbhir	**Best International Film**: **It Was Just an Accident – Jafar Panahi**; No Other Choice – Park Chan-wook; The Secret Agent – Kleber Mendonça Filho; Sentimental Value – Joachim Trier; The Ugly Stepsister – Emilie Blichfeldt
**Best Cinematography**: **Sinners – Autumn Durald Arkapaw**; Frankenstein – Dan Laustsen; Hamnet – Łukasz Żal; One Battle After Another – Michael Bauman; Train Dreams – Adolpho Veloso	**Best Costume Design**: **Frankenstein – Kate Hawley**; The Phoenician Scheme – Milena Canonero; Sinners – Ruth E. Carter; Train Dreams – Malgosia Turzanska; Wicked: For Good – Paul Tazewell
**Best Film Editing**: **One Battle After Another – Andy Jurgensen**; F1 – Stephen Mirrione and Patrick J. Smith; Marty Supreme – Ronald Bronstein and Josh Safdie; Reflection in a Dead Diamond – Bernard Beets; Sinners – Michael P. Shawver	**Best Original Score**: **One Battle After Another – Jonny Greenwood**; F1 – Hans Zimmer; Frankenstein – Alexandre Desplat; Sinners – Ludwig Göransson; Tron: Ares – Nine Inch Nails
**Best Production Design**: **Frankenstein – Tamara Deverell (Production Design); Shane Vieau (Set Decoration)**; The Fantastic Four: First Steps – Kasra Farahani (Production Design); Jille Azis (Set Decoration); The Phoenician Scheme – Adam Stockhausen (Production Design); Anna Pinnock (Set Decoration); Resurrection – Liu Qiang and Tu Nan; Sinners – Hannah Beachler (Production Design); Monique Champagne (Set Decoration)	**Best Visual Effects**: **Avatar: Fire and Ash – Joe Letteri, Richard Baneham, Eric Saindon, and Daniel Barrett**; F1 – Ryan Tudhope, Robert Harrington, and Nicolas Chevallier; Frankenstein – Dennis Berardi, Ayo Burgess, Ivan Busquets, and José Granell; Predator: Badlands – Olivier Dumont, Alec Gillis, Sheldon Stopsack, and Karl Rapley; Sinners – Michael Ralla, Espen Nordahl, Guido Wolter, and Donnie Dean
**Best Youth Performance**: **Jacobi Jupe – Hamnet as Hamnet Shakespeare**; Cary Christopher – Weapons as Alex Lilly; Shannon Gorman – Rental Family as Mia Kawasaki; Jasper Thompson – The Mastermind as Tommy Mooney; Alfie Williams – 28 Years Later as Spike	**Villain of the Year**: **Aunt Gladys – Weapons (as portrayed by Amy Madigan)**; Col. Steven J. Lockjaw – One Battle After Another (as portrayed by Sean Penn); Laura – Bring Her Back (as portrayed by Sally Hawkins); Lex Luthor – Superman (as portrayed by Nicholas Hoult); Remmick – Sinners (as portrayed by Jack O'Connell)
**Best Pacific Northwest Feature Film**: **Train Dreams – Clint Bentley**; Not One Drop of Blood – Jackson Devereux and Lachlan Hinton; To Kill a Wolf – Kelsey Taylor; Twinless – James Sweeney; Wolf Land (Director's Cut) – Sarah Hoffman; WTO/99 – Ian Bell	**Pacific Northwest Short Film Award**: **Songs of Black Folk – Justin Emeka and Haley Watson**; Charlotte, 1994 – Brian Pittala; A Fateful Weekend – Tony Doupe; Shelly's Leg – Wes Hurley; Style: A Seattle Basketball Story – Bryan Tucker
