= Visual Effects Society Award for Outstanding Supporting Visual Effects in a Feature Motion Picture =

Annual US film award

The Visual Effects Society Award for Outstanding Supporting Visual Effects in a Motion Picture is one of the annual awards given by the Visual Effects Society starting from 2002.

== Winners and nominees ==
=== 2000s ===
Year	Film	Nominee(s)
2002	The Sum of All Fears	Glenn Neufeld, Derek Spears, Dan Malvin, Al DiSarro
2002	Frida	Jeremy Dawson and Daniel Schrecker
2002	Gangs of New York	Michael Owens, Camille Geier, Edward Hirsh and Jon Alexander
2003	The Last Samurai	Jeffrey A. Okun, Thomas Boland, Bill Mesa, Ray McIntyre Jr.
2003	Bad Boys 2	Carey Villegas, Rob Legato, David Taritero and Layne Friedman
2003	Master and Commander: The Far Side of the World	Stefen Fangmeier, Nathan McGuinness, Robert Stromberg, Brooke Breton
2004	The Aviator	Robert Legato, Ron Ames, Matthew Gratzner, Pete Travers
2004	Eternal Sunshine of the Spotless Mind	Louis Morin and Mark Dornfeld
2004	Troy	Nick Davis, Chas Jarrett, Jon Thum and Gary Brozenich
2005	Kingdom of Heaven	Wes Sewell, Victoria Alonso, Tom Wood, Gary Brozenich
2005	Jarhead	Pablo Helman, Jeanie King, Grady Cofer and Brett Northcutt
2005	Memoirs of a Geisha	Robert Stromberg, Julia Frey, Paul Graff and Adam Watkins
2006	Flags of Our Fathers	Michael Owens, Matthew Butler, Bryan Grill, Julian Levi
2006	Blood Diamond	Jeffrey Okun, Thomas Boland, Tim Crosbie and Neil Greenberg
2006	Children of Men	Lucy Killick, Frazer Churchill, Tim Webber and Paul Corbould
2006	The Da Vinci Code	Barrie Hemsley, Angus Bickerton, Gary Brozenich and Paul Riddle
2007	Ratatouille	Michael Fong, Apurva Shah, Christine Waggoner, Michael Fu
2007	Blades of Glory	Mark Breakspear, Randy Starr, Shauna Bryan and Kody Sabourin
2007	The Kite Runner	David Ebner, Les Jones, Todd Perry and Leif Einarsson
2007	We Own the Night	Kelly Port, Julian Levi, Brad Parker and Oliver Sarda
2007	Zodiac	Eric Barba, Craig Barron, Janelle Croshaw and Chris Evans
2008	Changeling	Michael Owens, Geoffrey Hancock, Jinnie Pak, Dennis Hoffman
2008	Eagle Eye	Jim Rygiel, Jim Berney, Crys Forsythe-Smith and David Smith
2008	Nim's Island	Camille Cellucci, Scott Gordon, Fred Pienkos and James Straus
2008	Synecdoche, New York	Mark Russell, Richard Friedlander, Eric Robertson and Brett Miller
2008	Valkyrie	Richard R. Hoover, Maricel Pagulayan, Peter Nofz and Daniel Eaton
2009	Sherlock Holmes	Jonathan Fawkner, Chas Jarrett, David Vickery, Dan Barrow
2009	Angels & Demons	Barrie Hemsley, Angus Bickerton, Ryan Cook and Mark Breakspear
2009	The Box	Michael Owens, Geoff Hancock, Cyndi Ochs and Dennis Hoffman
2009	Invictus	Thomas Tannenberger, Olcun Tan, Mark Kolpak and Peter Cvijanovic
2009	The Road	Mark O. Forker, Phillip Moses, Ed Mendez and Paul Graff

=== 2010s ===
Year	Film	Nominee(s)
2010	Hereafter	Michael Owens, Joel Mendias, Bryan Grill, Danielle Plantec
2010	Black Swan	Dan Schrecker, Colleen Bachman, Michael Capton, Brad Kalinoski
2010	Green Zone	Peter Chiang, Charlie Noble, Joss Williams, Matthew Plummer
2010	Robin Hood	Richard Stammers, Allen Maris, Jessica Norman, Max Wood
2010	Salt	Robert Grasmere, Camille Cellucci, Mark Breakspear, Ivan Moran
2011	Hugo	Ben Grossmann, Alex Henning, Robert Legato, Karen Murphy
2011	Anonymous	André Cantarel, Volker Engel, Rony Soussan, Marc Weigert
2011	Sherlock Holmes: A Game of Shadows	Laya Armian, Chas Jarrett, Seth Maury, Sirio Quintavalle
2011	Source Code	Annie Godin, Louis Morin
2011	War Horse	Duncan Burbidge, Ben Morris, Mike Mulholland, Chris Zeh
2012	The Impossible	Felix Bergés, Sandra Hermida, Pau Costa Moeller
2012	Argo	Matt Dessero, Gregory McMurry, Tom Smith, Michele Vallillo
2012	Flight	Kevin Baillie, Michael Lantieri, Chris Stoski, Ryan Tudhope
2012	Rust and Bone	Béatrice Bauwens, Cédric Fayolle, Nicolas Rey, Stéphane Thibert
2012	Zero Dark Thirty	Geoff Anderson, Chris Harvey, Jeremy Hattingh, Richard Stutsman
2013	The Lone Ranger	Tim Alexander, Gary Brozenich, Shari Hanson, Kevin Martel
2013	The Great Gatsby	Chris Godfrey, Prue Fletcher, Joyce Cox
2013	Rush	Jody Johnson, Moriah Etherington-Sparks, Mark Hodgkins, Antoine Moulineau
2013	The Secret Life of Walter Mitty	Guillaume Rocheron, Kurt Williams, Monette Dubin, Ivan Moran
2013	White House Down	Marc Weigert, Volker Engel, Julia Frey, Ollie Rankin
2013	The Wolf of Wall Street	Robert Legato, Mark Russell, Joseph Farrell, Lisa Spence
2014	Birdman or (The Unexpected Virtue of Ignorance)	Ara Khanikian, Ivy Agregan, Sebastien Moreau
2014	Divergent	Jim Berney, Greg Baxter, Matt Dessero
2014	The Grand Budapest Hotel	Gabriel Sanchez, Jenny Foster, Simon Weisse, Jan Burda
2014	The Imitation Game	Stuart Bullen, Lucy Ainsworth-Taylor, Simon Rowe
2014	Unbroken	Bill George, Steve Gaub, Erin Dusseault, Dave Morley, Brian Cox
2015	The Revenant	Rich McBride, Ivy Agregan, Jason Smith, Nicolas Chevallier, Cameron Waldbauer
2015	Bridge of Spies	Sven Martin, Jennifer Meislohn, Charlie Noble, Sean Stranks, Gerd Nefzer
2015	Everest	Dadi Einarsson, Roma O-Connor, Matthias Bjarnsasson, Richard Van Den Bergh
2015	In the Heart of the Sea	Jody Johnson, Leslie Lerman, Sean Stranks, Bryan Hirota, Mark Holt
2015	The Walk	Kevin Baillie, Camille Cellucci, Viktor Muller, Sebastien Moreau
2016	Deepwater Horizon	Craig Hammack, Petra Holtorf-Stratton, Jason Snell, John Galloway, Burt Dalton
2016	Allied	Kevin Baillie, Sandra Scott, Brennan Doyle, Viktor Muller, Richard Van Den Bergh
2016	Jason Bourne	Charlie Noble, Dan Barrow, Julian Gnass, Huw Evans, Steve Warner
2016	Silence	Pablo Helman, Brian Barlettani, Ivan Busquets, Juan Garcia, R. Bruce Steinheimer
2016	Sully	Michael Owens, Tyler Kehl, Mark Curtis, Bryan Litson, Steven Riley
2017	Dunkirk	Andrew Jackson, Mike Chambers, Andrew Lockley, Alison Wortman, Scott Fisher
2017	Darkest Hour	Stephane Naze, Warwick Hewitt, Guillaume Terrien, Benjamin Magana
2017	Downsizing	James E. Price, Susan MacLeod, Lindy De Quattro, Stéphane Nazé
2017	Mother!	Dan Schrecker, Colleen Bachman, Ben Snow, Wayne Billheimer, Peter Chesney
2017	Only the Brave	Eric Barba, Dione Wood, Matthew Lane, Georg Kaltenbrunner, Michael Meinardus
2018	First Man	Paul Lambert, Kevin Elam, Tristan Myles, Ian Hunter, JD Schwalm
2018	12 Strong	Roger Nall, Robert Weaver, Mike Meinardus
2018	Bird Box	Marcus Taormina, David Robinson, Mark Bakowski, Sophie Dawes, Mike Meinardus
2018	Bohemian Rhapsody	Paul Norris, Tim Field, May Leung, Andrew Simmonds
2018	Outlaw King	Alex Bicknell, Dan Bethell, Greg O’Connor, Stefano Pepin
2019	The Irishman	Pablo Helman, Mitchell Ferm, Jill Brooks, Leandro Estebecorena, Jeff Brink
2019	1917	Guillaume Rocheron, Sona Pak, Greg Butler, Vijay Selvam, Dominic Tuohy
2019	The Aeronauts	Louis Morin, Annie Godin, Christian Kaestner, Ara Khanikian, Mike Dawson
2019	Ford v Ferrari	Olivier Dumont, Kathy Siegel, Dave Morley, Malte Sarnes, Mark Byers
2019	Joker	Edwin Rivera, Brice Parker, Mathew Giampa, Bryan Godwin, Jeff Brink

=== 2020s ===
Year	Film	Nominee(s)
2020	Mank	Wei Zheng, Peter Mavromates, Simon Carr, James Pastorius
2020	Da 5 Bloods	Randall Balsmeyer, James Cooper, Watcharachai "Sam" Panichsuk
2020	Extraction	Marko Forker, Lynzi Grant, Craig Wentworth, Olivier Sarda
2020	News of the World	Roni Rodrigues, Dayaliyah Lopez, Ian Fellows, Andrew Morley, Brandon K. McLaughlin
2020	Welcome to Chechnya	Ryan Laney, Eugen Bräunig, Maxwell Anderson, Johnny Han, Piers Dennis
2021	Last Night in Soho	Tom Proctor, Gavin Gregory, Julian Gnass, Fabricio Baessa
2021	Candyman	Andrew Zink, James McQuaide, Josh Simmonds, Drew Dir, Ryan Evans
2021	The Last Duel	Gary Brozenich, Helen Judd, Jessica Norman, Yann Blondel, Stefano Pepin
2021	Nightmare Alley	Dennis Berardi, Ryan MacDuff, Mark Hammond, David Roby, Geoff Hill
2021	The Tragedy of Macbeth	Alex Lemke, Michael Huber, Michael Ralla, Benedikt Laubenthal
2022	Thirteen Lives	Jason Billington, Thomas Horton, Denis Baudin, Michael Harrison, Brian Cox
2022	Death on the Nile	George Murphy, Claudia Dehmel, Mathieu Raynault, Jonathan Bowen, David Watkins
2022	The Fabelmans	Pablo Helman, Jennifer Mizener, Cernogorods Aleksei, Jeff Kalmus, Mark Hawker
2022	The Gray Man	Swen Gillberg, Viet Luu, Bryan Grill, Cliff Welsh, Michael Meinardus
2022	The Pale Blue Eye	Jake Braver, Catherine Farrell, Tim Van Horn, Scott Pritchard, Jeremy Hays
2022	Whitney Houston: I Wanna Dance with Somebody	Paul Norris, Tim Field, Don Libby, Andrew Simmonds
2023	Nyad	Jake Braver, Fiona Campbell Westgate, R. Christopher White, Mohsen Mousavi
2023	John Wick: Chapter 4	Janelle Croshaw Ralla, Reina Sparks, Jonathan Rothbart, Javier Roca, Gerd Nefzer
2023	Killers of the Flower Moon	Pablo Helman, Brian Barlettani, Sam Bassett, Brandon Keys McLaughlin
2023	Napoleon	Charley Henley, Sarah Tulloch, Luc-Ewen Martin-Fenouillet, Simone Coco, Neil Corbould
2023	Society of the Snow	Félix Bergés, Micaela Gagliano, Laura Pedro, Ezequiel Larrú, Pau Costa
2024	Civil War	David Simpson, Michelle Rose, Freddy Salazar, Chris Zeh, J. D. Schwalm
2024	Blitz	Andrew Whitehurst, Sona Pak, Theo Demiris, Vincent Poitras, Hayley Williams
2024	Horizon: An American Saga – Chapter 1	Jason Neese, Armen Fetulagian, Jamie Neese, J.P. Jaramillo
2024	Nosferatu	Angela Barson, Lisa Renney, David Scott, Dave Cook, Pavel Ságner
2024	Young Woman and the Sea	Richard Briscoe, Carrie Rishel, Jeremy Robert, Stéphane Dittoo, Ivo Jivkov
2025	Sinners	Michael Ralla, James Alexander, Nick Marshall, Espen Nordahl, Donnie Dean
2025	After the Hunt	Fabio Cerrito, Virginia Cefaly, Marco Fiorani Parenzi, Maura Manfredi
2025	Dongji Rescue	Tim Crosbie, Celeste Chen, Christian Sjöstedt, Lea Benjovitz
2025	A House of Dynamite	Chris Harvey, Dione Wood, Jon Mitchell, Matthew Lane
2025	Warfare	Simon Stanley-Clamp, Kaley Edwards, Andrew Kinnear, Samir Ansari, Ryan Conder
