= Visual Effects Society Award for Outstanding Effects Simulations in a Photoreal Feature =

Annual US film award

The Visual Effects Society Award for Outstanding Compositing in a Photoreal Feature is one of the annual awards given by the Visual Effects Society, starting in 2012. It is awarded to visual effects artists for their work in effects simulations.

== Winners & Nominees ==
=== 2010s ===
Outstanding FX and Simulation Animation in a Live Action Feature Motion Picture

Year	Film	Nominee(s)
2012	Life of Pi (Storm of God)	Hary Mukhopadhyay, David Stopford, Mark Williams, Derek Wolfe
2012	Battleship	Florent Andorra, Willi Geiger, Rick Hankins, Florian Witzel
2012	The Hobbit: An Unexpected Journey	Areito Echevarria, Chet Leavai, Garry Runke, Francois Sugny
2012	Life of Pi (Ocean)	Xavier Bourque, Sam Cole, Simone Riginelli
2013	Gravity (Parachute and ISS Destruction)	Alexis Wajsbrot, Sylvain Degrotte, Horacio Mendoza, Juan-Luis Sanchez
2013	The Hobbit: The Desolation of Smaug	Areito Echevarria, Andreas Soderstrom, Ronnie Menahem, Christoph Sprenger
2013	Man of Steel	Brian Goodwin, Gray Horsfield, Mathieu Chardonnet, Adrien Toupet
2013	Pacific Rim (Fluid Simulation & Destruction)	Ryan Hopkins, Michael Balog, Patrick Conran, Rick Hankins

Outstanding Effects Simulations in a Photoreal/Live Action Feature Motion Picture

Year	Film	Nominee(s)
2014	X-Men: Days of Future Past (Quicksilver Pentagon Kitchen)	Adam Paschke, Premamurti Paetsch, Sam Hancock, Timmy Lundin
2014	Captain America: The Winter Soldier (Helicarrier Broadside and Crash)	Dan Pearson, Sheldon Serrao, Jose Burgos, Eric Jennings
2014	Edge of Tomorrow (Destruction and Sand)	Steve Avoujageli, Pawel Grochola, Atsushi Ikarashi, Paul Waggoner
2014	The Hobbit: The Battle of the Five Armies	Jon Allitt, David Caeiro, Ronnie Menahem

Outstanding Compositing in a Photoreal Feature

Year	Film	Nominee(s)
2015	Mad Max: Fury Road (Toxic Storm)	Dan Bethell, Clinton Downs, Chris Young
2015	Avengers: Age of Ultron (Hulk vs. Hulkbuster)	Michael Balog, Jim Van Allen, Florent Andorra, Georg Kaltenbrunner
2015	San Andreas (Hoover Dam/San Francisco Tsunami)	Joe Scarr, Lukas Lepicovsky, Yves D-Incau, Marcel Kern
2015	San Andreas (Los Angeles Destruction)	Remy Torre, Marc Horsfield, Niall Flinn, Victor Grant
2015	Star Wars: The Force Awakens (Starkiller Base)	Rick Hankins, Dan Bornstein, John Doublestein, Gary Wu
2016	The Jungle Book (Nature Effects)	Oliver Winwood, Fabian Nowak, David Schneider, Ludovic Ramisandraina
2016	Alice Through the Looking Glass (Rust)	Klaus Seitschek, Joseph Pepper, Jacob Clark, Cosku Turhan
2016	Doctor Strange (Hong Kong Reverse Destruction)	Florian Witzel, Georges Nakhle, Azhul Mohamed, David Kirchner
2016	Rogue One: A Star Wars Story (Jedha Destruction)	Miguel Perez Senent, Matt Puchala, Ciaran Moloney, Luca Mignardi
2017	War for the Planet of the Apes	David Caeiro Cebrian, Johnathan Nixon, Chet Leavai, Gary Boyle
2017	Kong: Skull Island	Florent Andorra, Alexis Hall, Raul Essig, Branko Grujcic
2017	Only the Brave (Fire & Smoke)	Georg Kaltenbrunner, Thomas Bevan, Philipp Zaufel, Himanshu Joshi
2017	Star Wars: The Last Jedi (Bombing Run)	Peter Kyme, Miguel Perez Senet, Ahmed Gharraph, Billy Copley
2017	Star Wars: The Last Jedi (Mega Destroyer Destruction)	Mihai Cioroba, Ryoji Fujita, Jiyong Shin, Dan Finnegan
2018	Avengers: Infinity War (Titan)	Sabine Laimer, Tim Walker, Tobias Wiesner, Massimo Pasquetti
2018	Avengers: Infinity War (Wakanda)	Florian Witzel, Adam Lee, Miguel Perez Senent, Francisco Rodriguez
2018	Fantastic Beasts: The Crimes of Grindelwald	Dominik Kirouac, Chloe Ostiguy, Christian Gaumond
2018	Venom	Aharon Bourland, Jordan Walsh, Aleksandar Chalyovski, Federico Frassinelli
2019	Star Wars: The Rise of Skywalker	Don Wong, Thibault Gauriau, Goncalo Cabaca, Francois-Maxence Desplanques
2019	Dumbo (Bubble Elephants)	Sam Hancock, Victor Glushchenko, Andrew Savchenko, Arthur Moody
2019	The Lion King	David Schneider, Samantha Hiscock, Andy Feery, Kostas Strevlos
2019	Spider-Man: Far From Home (Molten Man)	Adam Gailey, Jacob Santamaria, Jacob Clark, Stephanie Molk

=== 2020s ===
Year	Film	Nominee(s)
2020	Project Power	Yin Lai, Jimmy Leung, Jonathan Edward Lyddon-Towl, Pierpaolo Navarini, Michelle Lee
2020	Bloodshot	Omar Meradi, Jeremy Poupin, Sylvain Robert, Deak Ferrand
2020	Greyhound	Mike Nixon, Nicholas Papworth, Jeremy Smith, Yashdeep Sawant
2020	Monster Hunter	Vimal Mallireddy, Warren Lawtey, Tom O'Bready, Dominik Haase
2020	Mulan	Theo Vandernoot, Sandra Balej, James Carson, Yuri Rudakov
2021	Dune (Dunes of Arrakis)	Gero Grimm, Ivan Larinin, Hideki Okano, Zuny An
2021	Godzilla vs. Kong (Ocean Water & Battle Destruction)	Jonathan Freisler, Nahuel Alberto Letizia, Eloi Andaluz Fullà, Saysana Rintharamy
2021	Shang-Chi and the Legend of the Ten Rings (Water, Bubbles & Magic)	Simone Riginelli, Claude Schitter, Teck Chee Koi, Arthur Graff
2021	The Suicide Squad (Corto Maltese City Destruction)	David R. Davies, Rogier Fransen, Sandy Sutherland, Brandon James Fleet
2022	Avatar: The Way of Water (Water Simulations)	Jonathan M. Nixon, David Moraton, Nicolas Illingworth, David Caeiro Cebrian
2022	Avatar: The Way of Water (Fire and Destruction)	Miguel Perez Senent, Xavier Martin Ramirez, David Kirchner, Ole Geir Eidsheim
2022	Black Panther: Wakanda Forever (City Street Flooding)	Matthew Hanger, Alexis Hall, Hang Yang, Mikel Zuloaga
2022	Fantastic Beasts: The Secrets of Dumbledore	Jesse Parker Holmes, Grayden Solman, Toyokazu Hirai, Rob Richardson

== Superlatives ==
=== Films with Multiple Nominations ===
2 Nominations

- Avengers: Infinity War
- Life of Pi
- San Andreas
- Star Wars: The Last Jedi
