= The Curious Case of Benjamin Button (film) =

2008 film by David Fincher

- Theatrical release poster
- Directed by: David Fincher
- Screenplay by: Eric Roth
- Story by: Eric Roth; Robin Swicord
- Based on: "The Curious Case of Benjamin Button" by F. Scott Fitzgerald
- Produced by: Ceán Chaffin; Kathleen Kennedy; Frank Marshall
- Starring: Brad Pitt; Cate Blanchett; Taraji P. Henson; Julia Ormond; Jason Flemyng; Elias Koteas; Tilda Swinton
- Cinematography: Claudio Miranda
- Edited by: Kirk Baxter; Angus Wall
- Music by: Alexandre Desplat
- Production companies: Paramount Pictures; Warner Bros. Pictures; The Kennedy/Marshall Company; Rastar Productions; David Fincher Productions
- Distributed by: Paramount Pictures (United States and Canada); Warner Bros. Pictures (International)
- Release date: December 25, 2008
- Running time: 166 minutes
- Country: United States
- Language: English
- Budget: $150–167 million
- Box office: $335.8 million

The Curious Case of Benjamin Button is a 2008 American epic fantasy drama film directed by David Fincher and adapted by Eric Roth and Robin Swicord from F. Scott Fitzgerald's 1922 short story. The film stars Brad Pitt as a man who physiologically ages in reverse and Cate Blanchett as his love interest throughout his life. The film also stars Taraji P. Henson, Julia Ormond, Jason Flemyng, Elias Koteas, and Tilda Swinton.

Producer Ray Stark bought the film rights to do the short story in the mid-1980s with Universal Pictures backing the film, but struggled to get the project off the ground until he sold the rights to producers Kathleen Kennedy and Frank Marshall in the 1990s. Although it was moved to Paramount Pictures in the 1990s, the film did not enter production until after Fincher and Pitt signed on along with the rest of the cast in 2005. Principal photography began in November 2006 and wrapped up in September 2007. Digital Domain worked on the visual effects of the film, particularly in the process of the metamorphosis of Pitt's character, which often involved the layering of Pitt's face with those of other actors.

The Curious Case of Benjamin Button was released in the United States on December 25, 2008, by Paramount Pictures, with Warner Bros. Pictures releasing in other territories. It received positive reviews, with praise for the performances of the cast. The film was a box office success, grossing $336 million against its $150–167 million budget. The film received a leading 13 Academy Award nominations at the 81st Academy Awards, including Best Picture, Best Director for Fincher, Best Actor for Pitt, and Best Supporting Actress for Taraji P. Henson, and won three, for Best Art Direction, Best Makeup, and Best Visual Effects.

== Plot ==
In August 2005, Daisy Fuller is on her deathbed in a New Orleans hospital. She tells her daughter Caroline about blind clockmaker Mr. Gateau, hired to make a clock for a train station in 1918. It ran backwards and was made as a memorial for those who lost their sons in World War I, like Gateau himself. Daisy then asks Caroline to read aloud from Benjamin Button's diary.

On the evening of November 11, 1918, a baby boy is born with the physiology and maladies of an elderly man. His mother, Caroline, dies soon after childbirth, and his father, wealthy manufacturer Thomas Button, abandons him on the porch of a nursing home. Caretaker Queenie and cook Mr. Weathers find the baby, and Queenie raises him as her own, naming him Benjamin. As the years pass, Benjamin mentally ages forwards and grows in stature but physiologically ages in reverse. He transitions from a wheelchair to crutches and finally a cane before he starts walking unassisted.

On Thanksgiving 1930, Benjamin meets seven-year-old Daisy, whose grandmother lives in the nursing home, and they connect instantly. Later, he accepts work on the tugboat Chelsea captained by Mike Clark. Thomas introduces himself to Benjamin, but does not reveal his true identity. In autumn 1936, Benjamin leaves for a work engagement with the tugboat crew and travels around the world. He sends postcards to Daisy, who is accepted into a ballet company in New York City.

In Murmansk in 1941, Benjamin becomes smitten with Elizabeth Abbott, wife of the chief minister of the British trade mission in Murmansk. Their affair eventually ends, leaving Benjamin heartbroken. That December, the United States enters World War II. Mike volunteers for U.S. Navy service on the Chelsea, and they are assigned to salvage duties. They find a near sunken U.S. transport and thousands of dead American troops. The culprit, a German U-boat, surfaces and fires on the tugboat. Mike rams the submarine and the resulting explosion sinks both. Most of the crew perishes except for Benjamin and Rick Brody, who are eventually rescued.

In May 1945, Benjamin returns to New Orleans, reuniting with Queenie, and learns that Weathers died. He reconnects with Daisy, who attempts to seduce him. However, Benjamin refuses, and she departs. Benjamin visits terminally ill Thomas and learns the details of his birth and family. Thomas gives his button manufacturing company and estate to Benjamin before dying.

In 1947, Benjamin visits Daisy in New York unannounced but departs upon seeing her romantically involved with someone else. In 1954, Daisy's dancing career ends when her leg is crushed in an automobile accident in Paris. When Benjamin visits her, Daisy is amazed by his appearance, but, frustrated by her injuries, she tells him to stay out of her life.

In 1962, Daisy returns to New Orleans and reunites with Benjamin. Now of comparable physiological age, they fall in love. Queenie dies, and Benjamin and Daisy move in together. In 1967, Daisy, who has opened a ballet studio, announces she is pregnant. Their daughter, Caroline, is born in the spring of 1968. Believing he cannot be a proper father due to his reverse aging, Benjamin sells his assets, leaves the money for Daisy and Caroline, and leaves to travel alone during the 1970s.

Benjamin, physiologically a young man, returns to Daisy in 1980. Now remarried, Daisy introduces him as a family friend to Caroline and new husband Robert. She later visits him at his hotel, where they have sex and part once more. In 1990, recently widowed Daisy is contacted by social workers who found a shrinking Benjamin, now physiologically a pre-teen. He was living in a condemned building and was taken to the hospital in poor physical condition, and his diary had her name in it. Benjamin displays early signs of dementia, so Daisy moves into the nursing home in 1997 and cares for Benjamin for the rest of his life as he regresses into infancy.

In 2002, Gateau's clock is replaced with a properly working modern digital clock, and in the spring of 2003, Benjamin dies in Daisy's arms, physiologically a newborn but chronologically almost 85 years old. Back in the present, having revealed that Benjamin is Caroline's father, Daisy dies. Hurricane Katrina floods a storage room holding Gateau's clock, which keeps ticking backwards.

== Cast ==
- Brad Pitt as Benjamin Button (adult)
  - Peter Donald Badalamenti II as Benjamin Button (apparent age 80)
  - Robert Towers as Benjamin Button (apparent age 73)
  - Tom Everett as Benjamin Button (apparent age 67)
  - Spencer Daniels as Benjamin Button (apparent age 12)
  - Chandler Canterbury as Benjamin Button (apparent age 8)
  - Charles Henry Wyson as Benjamin Button (apparent age 6)
- Cate Blanchett as Daisy Fuller (adult)
  - Madisen Beaty as Daisy Fuller (age 10)
  - Elle Fanning as Daisy Fuller (age 7)
- Taraji P. Henson as Queenie
- Julia Ormond as Caroline Button (adult)
  - Katta Hules as Caroline Button (age 12)
  - Shiloh Jolie-Pitt as Caroline Button (age 2)
- Jason Flemyng as Thomas Button
- Elias Koteas as Monsieur Gateau
- Tilda Swinton as Elizabeth Abbott
- Mahershalalhashbaz Ali as Tizzy Weathers
- Jared Harris as Captain Mike Clark
- Faune A. Chambers as Dorothy Baker
- Ed Metzger as Theodore Roosevelt
- Phyllis Somerville as Grandma Fuller
- Edith Ivey as Mrs. Maple
- Josh Stewart as Pleasant Curtis
- David Ross Paterson as Walter Abbott
- Bianca Chiminello as Daisy's friend
- Rampai Mohadi as Ngunda Oti
- Lance E. Nichols as Preacher

== Production ==
=== Development ===
Producer Ray Stark bought the rights to adapt The Curious Case of Benjamin Button in the mid-1980s, and it was optioned by Universal Pictures. The first choice to direct was Frank Oz, with Martin Short attached for the title role, but Oz could not figure out how to make the story work. The film was optioned in 1991 by Steven Spielberg, with Tom Cruise attached for the lead role, but Spielberg left to direct Jurassic Park (1993) and Schindler's List (1993). Other directors attached were Patrick Read Johnson and Agnieszka Holland. Stark eventually sold the rights to producers Kathleen Kennedy and Frank Marshall, who took the film to Paramount Pictures, with Universal still on as a co-production partner. By summer 1994, Maryland Film Office chief Jack Gerbes was approached with the possibility of making the film in Baltimore. In October 1998, Robin Swicord wrote a screenplay for director Ron Howard, a project which would potentially star John Travolta. In May 2000, Paramount hired screenwriter Jim Taylor and attached Spike Jonze to direct. Charlie Kaufman had also written a draft at one point. In June 2003, Gary Ross entered final negotiations to direct, based on a new draft written by Eric Roth. In May 2004, David Fincher entered negotiations to replace Ross as director. In a 2014 interview with Empire, Peter Jackson claimed to have been offered the film "five or six years" before Fincher but turned it down.

=== Casting ===
In May 2005, Brad Pitt and Cate Blanchett entered negotiations to star. In September 2006, Tilda Swinton, Jason Flemyng and Taraji P. Henson entered negotiations to be cast into the film. The following October, with production yet to begin, Julia Ormond was cast as Daisy's daughter, to whom Blanchett's character tells the story of her love for Benjamin Button. Pitt had collaborated with many of his co-stars in previous films. He co-starred with Ormond in Legends of the Fall, with Flemyng in Snatch, with Jared Harris in Ocean's Twelve, with Blanchett in Babel and with Swinton in Burn After Reading.

=== Filming ===
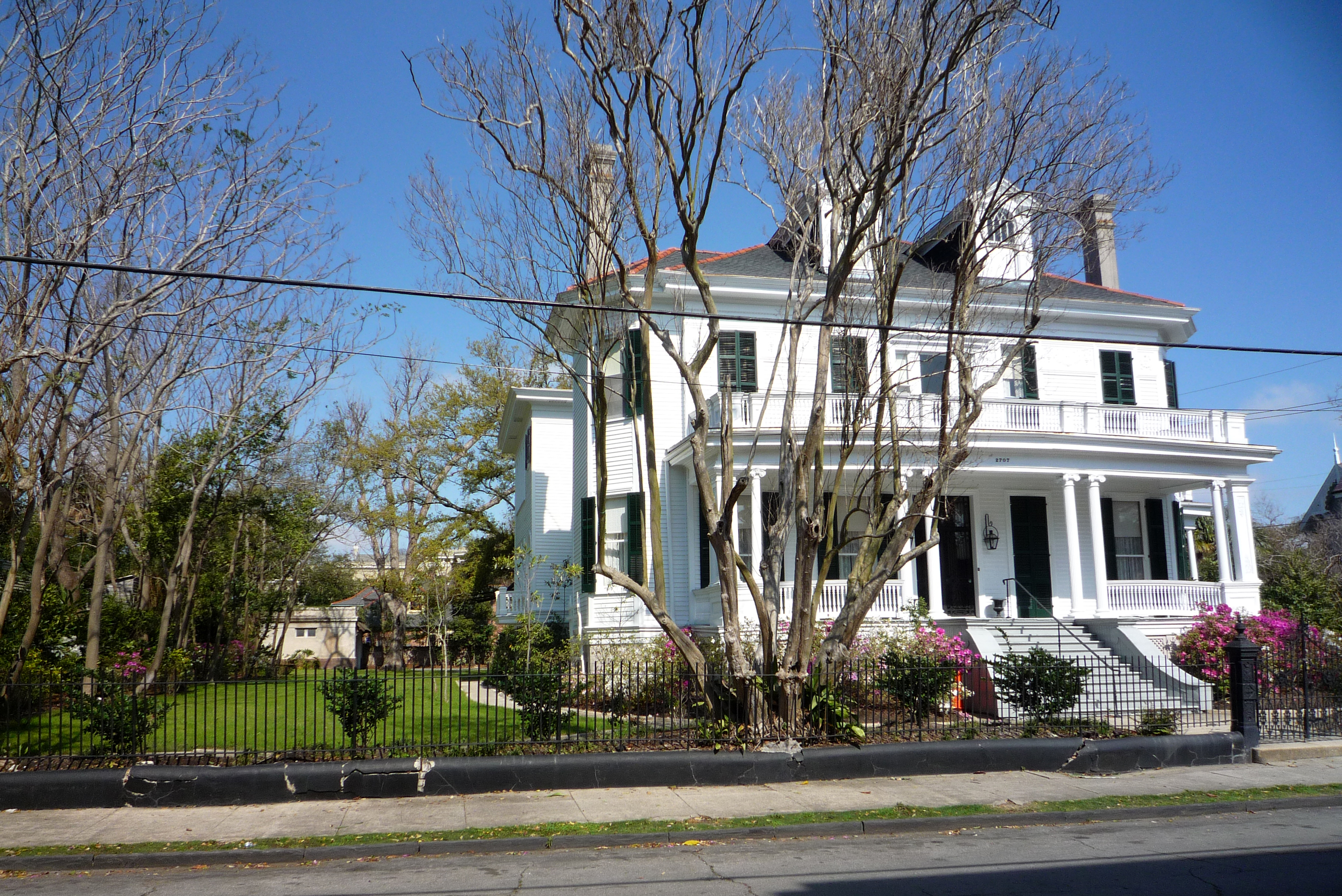
Some filming was conducted in the Garden District of New Orleans, including this home at 2707 Coliseum St.

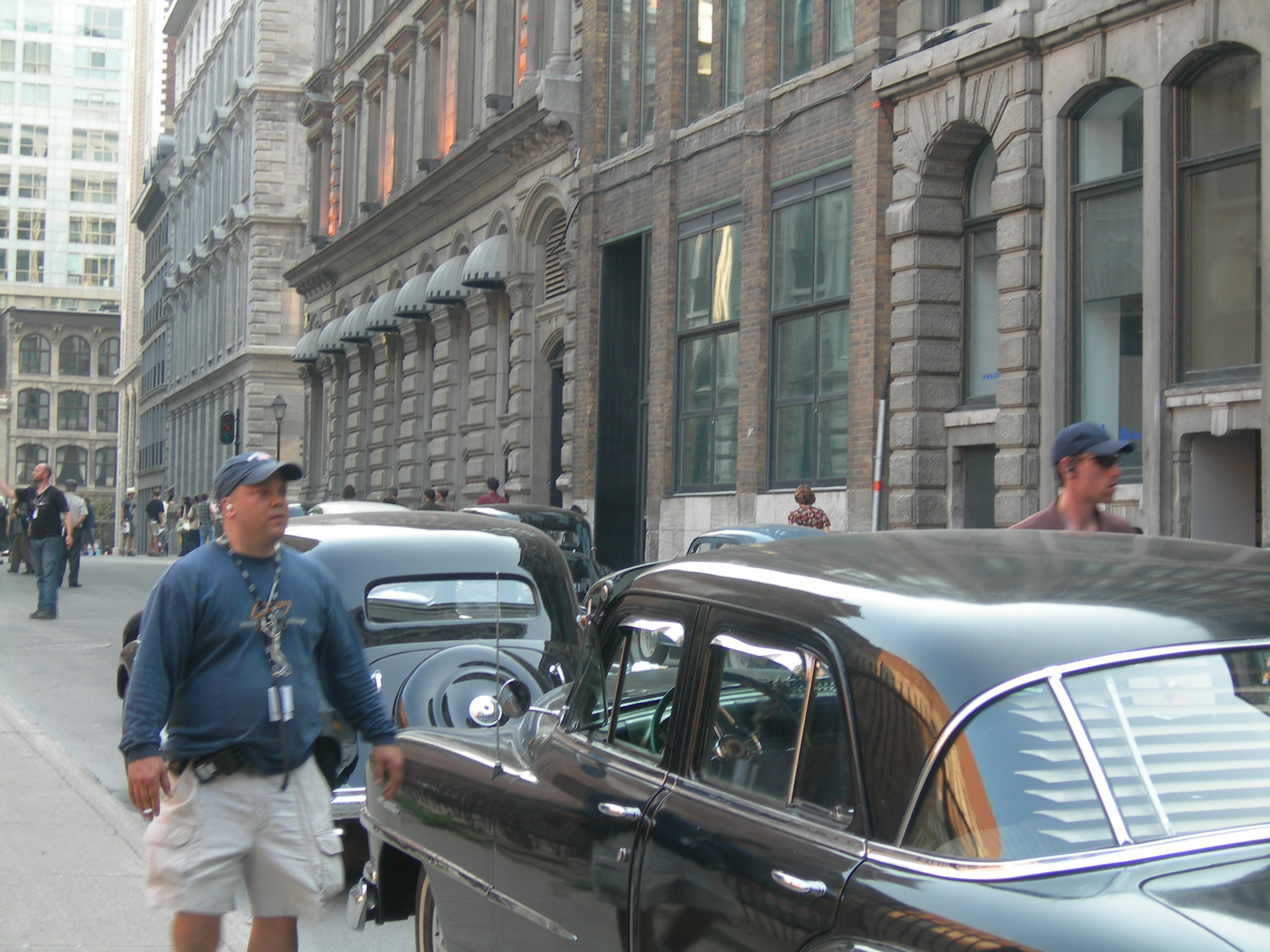
Parisian scenes shooting in Old Montreal

For Benjamin Button, New Orleans, Louisiana and the surrounding area was chosen as the filming location for the story to take advantage of the state's production incentives, and shooting was slated to begin in October 2006. By filming in Louisiana and taking advantage of the state's film incentive, the production received $27 million, which was used to finance a significant portion of the film's $167 million budget. Filming of Benjamin Button began on November 6, 2006, in New Orleans. In January 2007, Blanchett joined the shoot. Fincher praised the ease of accessibility to rural and urban sets in New Orleans and said that the recovery from Hurricane Katrina did not serve as an atypical hindrance to production.

In March 2007, production moved to Los Angeles for two more months of filming. Principal photography was targeted to last a total of 150 days. Additional time was needed at visual effects house Digital Domain to make the visual effects for the metamorphosis of Brad Pitt's character to the infant stage. The director used a camera system called Contour, developed by Steve Perlman, to capture facial deformation data from live-action performances.

Several digital environments for the film were created by Matte World Digital, including multiple shots of the interior of the New Orleans train station, to show architectural alterations and deterioration throughout different eras. The train station was built as a 3D model and lighting and aging effects were added, using Next Limit's Maxwell rendering software—an architectural visualization tool. Overall production was finished in September 2007.

=== Music ===
The score to The Curious Case of Benjamin Button was written by French composer Alexandre Desplat, who recorded his score with an 87-piece ensemble of the Hollywood Studio Symphony at the Sony Scoring Stage.

== Release ==
The Curious Case of Benjamin Button was originally slated for theatrical release in May 2008, but it was pushed back to November 26, 2008. The release date was moved again to December 25 in the United States, January 16, 2009, in Mexico, February 6 in the United Kingdom, February 13 in Italy and February 27 in South Africa.

=== Box office ===
On its opening day, the film opened in the number two position behind Marley & Me, in North America with $11,871,831 in 2,988 theaters with a $3,973 average. However, during its opening weekend, the film dropped to the third position behind Marley & Me and Bedtime Stories with $26,853,816 in 2,988 theaters with an $8,987 average. The film has come to gross $127.5 million domestically and $208.3 million in foreign markets, with a total gross of $335.8 million.

=== Home media ===
The film was released on DVD on May 5, 2009, by Paramount Home Entertainment, and on Blu-ray and 2-Disc DVD by The Criterion Collection. The Criterion release includes over three hours of special features, and a documentary about the making of the film.

As of November 1, 2009, the film had sold 2,515,722 DVD copies and had generated $41,196,515 in sales revenue.

== Reception ==
=== Critical response ===
The review aggregator Rotten Tomatoes reports that 72% of critics gave the film positive reviews based on 254 reviews, with an average rating of 7.50/10. The consensus reads: "Curious Case of Benjamin Button is an epic fantasy tale with rich storytelling backed by fantastic performances." On Metacritic, the film has a weighted average score of 70 out of 100, based on 37 reviews, indicating "generally favorable reviews". Yahoo! Movies reported the film received a B+ average score from critical consensus, based on 12 reviews. Audiences surveyed by CinemaScore gave the film a grade A− on scale of A to F.

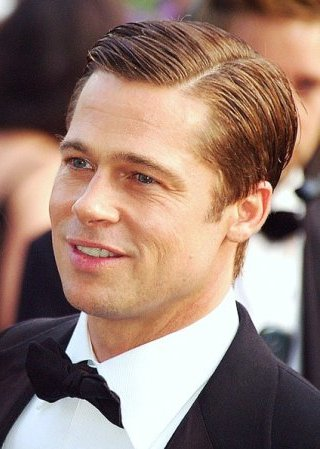
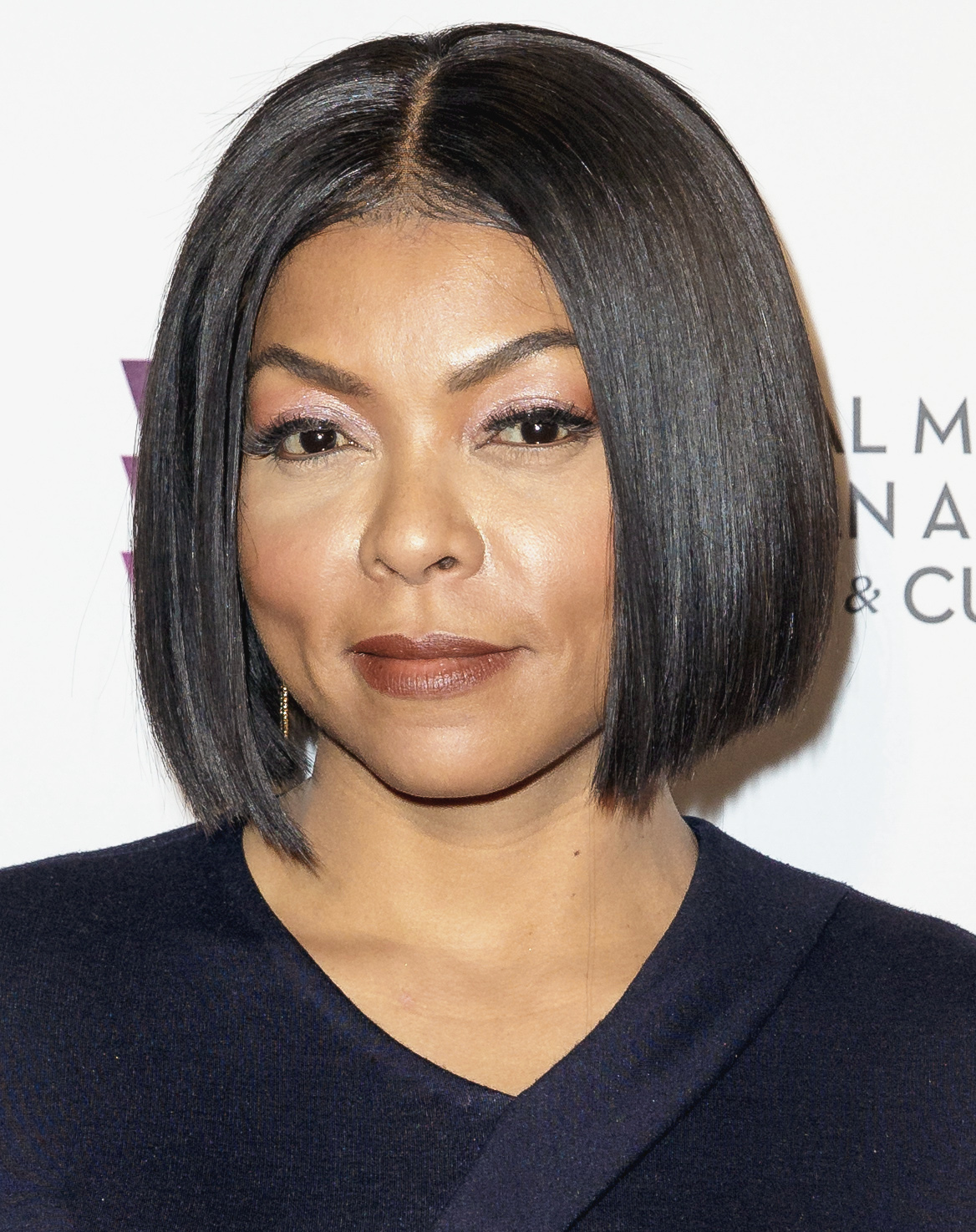
Brad Pitt and Taraji P. Henson garnered widespread critical acclaim, earning them Academy Award nominations for Best Actor and Best Supporting Actress

Todd McCarthy of Variety magazine gave the film a positive review, calling it a "richly satisfying serving of deep-dish Hollywood storytelling." Peter Howell of The Toronto Star says: "It's been said that the unexamined life is not worth living. The Curious Case of Benjamin Button suggests an addendum: a life lived backwards can be far more enriching" and describes the film as "a magical and moving account of a man living his life resoundingly in reverse" and "moviemaking at its best." Rod Yates of Empire awarded it five out of a possible five stars. Kirk Honeycutt of The Hollywood Reporter felt the film was "superbly made and winningly acted by Brad Pitt in his most impressive outing to date." Honeycutt praised Fincher's directing of the film and noted that the "cinematography wonderfully marries a palette of subdued earthen colors with the necessary CGI and other visual effects that place one in a magical past." Honeycutt states the bottom line about Benjamin Button is that it is "an intimate epic about love and loss that is pure cinema."

A. O. Scott of The New York Times states: "The Curious Case of Benjamin Button, more than two and a half hours long, sighs with longing and simmers with intrigue while investigating the philosophical conundrums and emotional paradoxes of its protagonist's condition in a spirit that owes more to Jorge Luis Borges than to Fitzgerald." Scott praised Fincher and writes "Building on the advances of pioneers like Steven Spielberg, Peter Jackson and Robert Zemeckis, Mr. Fincher has added a dimension of delicacy and grace to digital filmmaking" and further states: "While it stands on the shoulders of breakthroughs like Minority Report, The Lord of the Rings and Forrest Gump, Benjamin Button may be the most dazzling such hybrid yet, precisely because it is the subtlest." He also stated: "At the same time, like any other love—like any movie—it is shadowed by disappointment and fated to end."

On the other hand, Anne Hornaday of The Washington Post states: "There's no denying the sheer ambition and technical prowess of The Curious Case of Benjamin Button. What's less clear is whether it entirely earns its own inflated sense of self-importance" and further says, "It plays too safe when it should be letting its freak flag fly." Kimberley Jones of the Austin Chronicle panned the film and stated, "Fincher's selling us cheekboned movie stars frolicking in bedsheets and calling it a great love. I didn't buy it for a second." Roger Ebert of the Chicago Sun-Times gave the film two and a half stars out of four, saying that it is "a splendidly made film based on a profoundly mistaken premise. ... the movie's premise devalues any relationship, makes futile any friendship or romance, and spits, not into the face of destiny, but backward into the maw of time."

Peter Bradshaw in The Guardian called it "166 minutes of twee tedium", giving it one star out of five. Cosmo Landesman of the Sunday Times gave the film two out of five stars, writing: "The film's premise serves no purpose. It's a gimmick that goes on for nearly three hours ... The Curious Case of Benjamin Button is an anodyne Hollywood film that offers a safe and sanitised view of life and death." James Christopher in The Times called it "a tedious marathon of smoke and mirrors. In terms of the basic requirements of three-reel drama the film lacks substance, credibility, a decent script and characters you might actually care for." Derek Malcolm of London's Evening Standard felt that "never at any point do you feel that there's anything more to it than a very strange story traversed by a film-maker who knows what he is doing but not always why he is doing it."

=== Accolades ===
At the 81st Academy Awards, The Curious Case of Benjamin Button received a leading 13 Academy Award nominations, including Best Picture, Best Director for Fincher, Best Actor for Pitt, and Best Supporting Actress for Taraji P. Henson, and won three, for Best Art Direction, Best Makeup, and Best Visual Effects.

Taraji P. Henson won Best Actress at the BET Awards for her role in the film combined with two other performances in Not Easily Broken, and The Family That Preys.

The film received the four awards it was nominated for the 2008 VES Awards: "Outstanding Visual Effects in a Visual Effects-Driven Feature Motion Picture," "Best Single Visual Effect of the Year", "Outstanding Animated Character in a Live Action Feature Motion Picture," and "Outstanding Compositing in a Feature Motion Picture."

Award	Category	Recipient	Result	Ref.
Academy Awards	Best Picture	Kathleen Kennedy, Frank Marshall and Ceán Chaffin	Nominated	
Academy Awards	Best Director	David Fincher	Nominated	
Academy Awards	Best Actor	Brad Pitt	Nominated	
Academy Awards	Best Supporting Actress	Taraji P. Henson	Nominated	
Academy Awards	Best Adapted Screenplay	Eric Roth and Robin Swicord	Nominated	
Academy Awards	Best Art Direction	Art Direction: Donald Graham Burt; Set Decoration: Victor J. Zolfo	Won	
Academy Awards	Best Cinematography	Claudio Miranda	Nominated	
Academy Awards	Best Costume Design	Jacqueline West	Nominated	
Academy Awards	Best Film Editing	Kirk Baxter and Angus Wall	Nominated	
Academy Awards	Best Makeup	Greg Cannom	Won	
Academy Awards	Best Original Score	Alexandre Desplat	Nominated	
Academy Awards	Best Sound Mixing	David Parker, Michael Semanick, Ren Klyce and Mark Weingarten	Nominated	
Academy Awards	Best Visual Effects	Eric Barba, Steve Preeg, Burt Dalton and Craig Barron	Won	
American Society of Cinematographers	Outstanding Achievement in Cinematography in Theatrical Releases	Claudio Miranda	Nominated	
Austin Film Critics Association	Best Supporting Actress	Taraji P. Henson	Won	
British Academy Film Awards	Best Film	Kathleen Kennedy; Frank Marshall; Ceán Chaffin	Nominated	
British Academy Film Awards	Best Director	David Fincher	Nominated	
British Academy Film Awards	Best Adapted Screenplay	Eric Roth	Nominated	
British Academy Film Awards	Best Actor	Brad Pitt	Nominated	
British Academy Film Awards	Best Makeup & Hair	Jean Black; Colleen Callaghan	Won	
British Academy Film Awards	Best Cinematography	Claudio Miranda	Nominated	
British Academy Film Awards	Best Editing	Kirk Baxter; Angus Wall	Nominated	
British Academy Film Awards	Best Production Design	Donald Graham Burt; Victor J. Zolfo	Won	
British Academy Film Awards	Best Costume Design	Jacqueline West	Nominated	
British Academy Film Awards	Best Music	Alexandre Desplat	Nominated	
British Academy Film Awards	Best Visual Effects	Eric Barba; Craig Barron; Nathan McGuinness; Edson Williams	Won	
Broadcast Film Critics Association	Best Film	The Curious Case of Benjamin Button	Nominated	
Broadcast Film Critics Association	Best Director	David Fincher	Nominated	
Broadcast Film Critics Association	Best Actor	Brad Pitt	Nominated	
Broadcast Film Critics Association	Best Actress	Cate Blanchett	Nominated	
Broadcast Film Critics Association	Best Supporting Actress	Taraji P. Henson	Nominated	
Broadcast Film Critics Association	Best Cast	The Curious Case of Benjamin Button	Nominated	
Broadcast Film Critics Association	Best Screenplay	Eric Roth	Nominated	
Broadcast Film Critics Association	Best Composer	Alexandre Desplat	Nominated	
Chicago Film Critics Association	Best Picture	The Curious Case of Benjamin Button	Nominated	
Chicago Film Critics Association	Best Director	David Fincher	Nominated	
Chicago Film Critics Association	Best Screenplay, Adapted	Eric Roth	Nominated	
Chicago Film Critics Association	Best Cinematography	Claudio Miranda	Nominated	
Chicago Film Critics Association	Best Original Score	Alexandre Desplat	Nominated	
Directors Guild of America Awards	Outstanding Directorial Achievement in Motion Pictures	David Fincher	Nominated	
Golden Globe Awards	Best Motion Picture Drama	The Curious Case of Benjamin Button	Nominated	
Golden Globe Awards	Best Director - Motion Picture	David Fincher	Nominated	
Golden Globe Awards	Best Actor - Motion Picture Drama	Brad Pitt	Nominated	
Golden Globe Awards	Best Screenplay	Eric Roth	Nominated	
Golden Globe Awards	Best Original Score	Alexandre Desplat	Nominated	
Houston Film Critics Society Awards	Best Picture	The Curious Case of Benjamin Button	Won	
Houston Film Critics Society Awards	Best Director	David Fincher	Nominated	
Houston Film Critics Society Awards	Best Actor	Brad Pitt	Nominated	
Houston Film Critics Society Awards	Best Actress	Cate Blanchett	Nominated	
Houston Film Critics Society Awards	Best Supporting Actress	Taraji P. Henson	Nominated	
Houston Film Critics Society Awards	Best Screenplay	Eric Roth	Nominated	
Houston Film Critics Society Awards	Best Cinematography	Claudio Miranda	Won	
Houston Film Critics Society Awards	Best Score	Alexandre Desplat	Nominated	
Las Vegas Film Critics Society Awards	Best Art Direction	The Curious Case of Benjamin Button	Won	
Las Vegas Film Critics Society Awards	Best Cinematography	Claudio Miranda	Won	
Las Vegas Film Critics Society Awards	Best Costume Design	Jacqueline West	Won	
London Film Critics' Circle	Best Film	The Curious Case of Benjamin Button	Nominated	
London Film Critics' Circle	Director of the Year	David Fincher	Won	
London Film Critics' Circle	British Supporting Actress of the Year	Tilda Swinton	Won	
London Film Critics' Circle	Screenwriter of the Year	Eric Roth	Nominated	
MTV Movie Awards	Best Female Performance	Taraji P. Henson	Nominated	
National Board of Review	National Board of Review: Top Ten Films	The Curious Case of Benjamin Button	Won	
National Board of Review	Best Director	David Fincher	Won	
National Board of Review	Best Adapted Screenplay	Eric Roth	Won	
Satellite Awards	Best Adapted Screenplay	Eric Roth; Robin Swicord	Nominated	
Satellite Awards	Best Art Direction and Production Design	Donald Graham Burt; Tom Reta	Nominated	
Satellite Awards	Best Cinematography	Claudio Miranda	Nominated	
Satellite Awards	Best Costume Design	Jacqueline West	Nominated	
Saturn Award	Best Fantasy Film	The Curious Case of Benjamin Button	Won	
Saturn Award	Best Director	David Fincher	Nominated	
Saturn Award	Best Writing	Eric Roth	Nominated	
Saturn Award	Best Actor	Brad Pitt	Nominated	
Saturn Award	Best Actress	Cate Blatchett	Nominated	
Saturn Award	Best Supporting Actress	Tilda Swinton	Won	
Saturn Award	Best Music	Alexandre Desplat	Nominated	
Saturn Award	Best Make-Up	Greg Cannom	Won	
Saturn Award	Best Visual Effects	The Curious Case of Benjamin Button	Nominated	
Scream Awards	Best Fantasy Actor	Brad Pitt	Nominated	
Screen Actors Guild Awards	Outstanding Performance by a Male Actor in a Leading Role	Brad Pitt	Nominated	
Screen Actors Guild Awards	Outstanding Performance by a Female Actor in a Supporting Role	Taraji P. Henson	Nominated	
Screen Actors Guild Awards	Outstanding Performance by a Cast in a Motion Picture	The Curious Case of Benjamin Button	Nominated	
St. Louis Gateway Film Critics Association Awards	Best Film	The Curious Case of Benjamin Button	Won	
Vancouver Film Critics Circle Awards	Best Director	David Fincher	Won	
Visual Effects Society Awards	Outstanding Visual Effects in a Visual Effects-Driven Feature Motion Picture	Eric Barba; Edson Williams; Nathan McGuinness; Lisa Beroud	Won	
Visual Effects Society Awards	Best Single Visual Effect of the Year	Eric Barba; Lisa Beroud; Steve Preeg; Jonathan Litt for "Benjamin's Secret"	Won	
Visual Effects Society Awards	Outstanding Animated Character in a Live Action Feature Motion Picture	Steve Preeg; Matthias Wittmann; Tom St. Amand; David McLean for "Benjamin Button"	Won	
Visual Effects Society Awards	Outstanding Compositing in a Feature Motion Picture	Janelle Croshaw; Paul Lambert; Sonja Burchard; Sarahjane Javelo for "Benjamin Comes Together"	Won	
Washington D.C. Area Film Critics Association	Best Art Direction	The Curious Case of Benjamin Button	Won	
Writers Guild of America Awards	Writers Guild of America Award for Best Adapted Screenplay	Eric Roth; Robin Swicord	Nominated	

== See also ==
- De-aging in film
- The Curious Case of Benjamin Button (musical)
