= Steve Preeg =

American special effects artist

- Occupation: Visual effects artist
- Years active: 1996-present

Steve Preeg is an American Academy Award-winning special effects artist.

He won at the 81st Academy Awards for the film The Curious Case of Benjamin Button, in the category of Best Visual Effects. He shared his Oscar with Eric Barba, Craig Barron and Burt Dalton.

He graduated in 1989 from Los Alamos High School.

== Filmography ==
- Oblivion (2013)
- The Girl with the Dragon Tattoo (2011)
- TRON: Legacy (2010)
- The Curious Case of Benjamin Button (2008)
- Pirates of the Caribbean: At World's End (2007)
- Flags of Our Fathers (2006)
- King Kong (2005)
- I, Robot (2004)
- The Lord of the Rings: The Return of the King (2003)
- The Lord of the Rings: The Two Towers (2002)
- Final Fantasy: The Spirits Within (2001)
- Beowulf (1999)
- Ri¢hie Ri¢h's Christmas Wish (1998)
- Lawnmower Man 2: Beyond Cyberspace (1996)
