= Grant Freckelton =

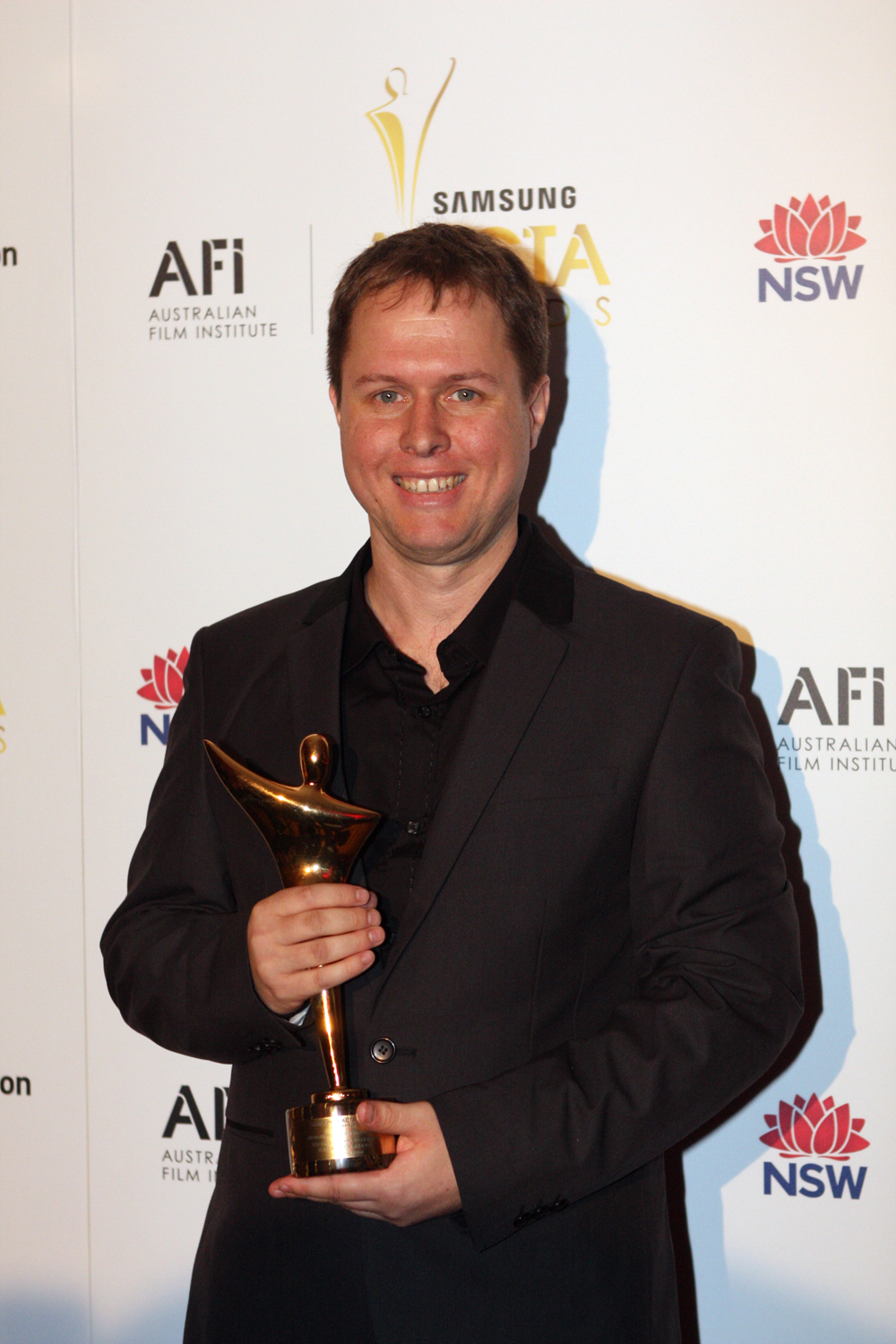
- Notable work: Moulin Rouge!, 300, The Matrix Reloaded

Grant Freckelton is a visual effects artist, art director and production designer who is most known for his work on Moulin Rouge! (2001), 300 (2006) and The Matrix Reloaded (2003). He also worked as the art director on Legend of the Guardians: The Owls of Ga'Hoole and production designer on The Lego Movie and The Lego Batman Movie.
