= Only the Brave (2017 film) =

2017 film by Joseph Kosinski

- Theatrical release poster
- Directed by: Joseph Kosinski
- Screenplay by: Ken Nolan; Eric Warren Singer
- Based on: "No Exit" by Sean Flynn
- Produced by: Lorenzo di Bonaventura; Thad Luckinbill; Trent Luckinbill; Michael Menchel; Dawn Ostroff; Molly Smith; Jeremy Steckler
- Starring: Josh Brolin; Miles Teller; Jeff Bridges; James Badge Dale; Taylor Kitsch; Jennifer Connelly
- Cinematography: Claudio Miranda
- Edited by: Billy Fox
- Music by: Joseph Trapanese
- Production companies: Black Label Media; Di Bonaventura Pictures; Condé Nast Entertainment
- Distributed by: Columbia Pictures (United States, Canada, Latin America, Spain and India; through Sony Pictures Releasing); Summit Entertainment (International; through Lionsgate)
- Release dates: October 8, 2017 (Los Angeles); October 20, 2017 (United States)
- Running time: 133 minutes
- Country: United States
- Language: English
- Budget: $38 million
- Box office: $26.3 million

Only the Brave, subtitled The True Story of the Granite Mountain Hotshots in previews, is a 2017 American biographical drama film directed by Joseph Kosinski, and written by Ken Nolan and Eric Warren Singer, based on the GQ article "No Exit" by Sean Flynn. The film tells the story of the Granite Mountain Hotshots, an elite crew of firefighters from Prescott, Arizona, who lost 19 of 20 members while fighting the Yarnell Hill Fire in June 2013, and is dedicated to their memory. It features an ensemble cast, including Josh Brolin, James Badge Dale, Jeff Bridges, Miles Teller, Alex Russell, Taylor Kitsch, Ben Hardy, Thad Luckinbill, Geoff Stults, Scott Haze, Andie MacDowell, and Jennifer Connelly.

Principal photography began in New Mexico under the title Granite Mountain in June 2016. Only the Brave was released by Columbia Pictures in North America and by Summit Entertainment in other territories on October 20, 2017. The film was a box-office bomb, grossing just $26.3 million worldwide against a $38 million budget. However, it received positive reviews, with praise for the cast and the film's touching tribute to its subjects.

== Plot ==
Fire and Rescue Crew 7 of Prescott, Arizona, superintended by Eric Marsh, responds to the Cave Creek wildfire. Eric predicts that the fire will threaten a residential area, but is disregarded by the assigned superintendent. Eric's fear comes true; he vents his frustration to fire chief and close friend Duane Steinbrink, warning that when a wildfire threatens Prescott, his crew will not be allowed to fight it directly as they lack Hotshot certification. Eric asks for Duane's help, who successfully vouches for the crew with the mayor of Prescott. Crew 7 has until the end of the fire season to pass the evaluation.

Meanwhile, 21-year-old heroin addict Brendan McDonough learns that his ex-girlfriend Natalie is pregnant and does not want him involved with the child. Brendan is arrested for larceny, which prompts his mother to evict him from her house. Determined to provide support for his newborn daughter, Brendan interviews with Eric, who gives him an opportunity. After months of training, the crew are given an evaluation during a wildfire deployment as they were set to battle the Horseshoe 2 Fire in the Chiricahuas near the town of Portal. Eric commands his crew but is criticized by their evaluator, Hayes, who Eric bluntly disregards. The fire is halted by Eric's strategy and the crew are certified, officially becoming the first municipal hotshot crew in history, the Granite Mountain Hotshots.

Throughout the season, the Granite Mountain crew are deployed across the country. Brendan, who's been anonymously dropping off baby supplies at Natalie's doorstep, is finally accepted by Natalie and allowed to see his daughter. Near Prescott, the crew saves a landmark Alligator juniper and are hailed as local heroes. After battling the fire, Brendan is bitten by a rattlesnake and is rushed to the hospital. Brendan expresses his concerns to Eric about being there for his daughter and asks if he would recommend him for a structural firefighting position next season. Eric snaps, stating that nobody would hire him due to his prior drug addiction.

On the way home, Eric has an argument with his wife Amanda, who challenges him about this; reminding him about his own previous drug/alcohol addiction (from which he has been clean for a number of years and which lead to him meeting Amanda) The two talk about starting a family, which they had previously decided not to do due to the nature of their past. Amanda makes it clear to Eric that it is now something she would like to revisit. Eric stops the truck, unwilling to continue the conversation. He then leaves, stating that he is going for a walk. He ends up at Duane’s house where he speaks openly about his fears.

After speaking with Duane, Eric returns to Amanda, announcing that he is ready to settle down.

The Granite Mountain Hotshots are called to the Yarnell Hill Fire. Eric informs his captain, Jesse Steed, that he will step down as superintendent after this season and offers Jesse his job. Eric also apologizes to Brendan and promises that he will help him with the transfer. The crew assembles a controlled burn, but is doused mistakenly by an airtanker. Marsh sends Brendan, still recovering from the snakebite, as the lookout, while the remaining crew move to find another suitable location. The wind suddenly shifts, and the fire jumps a trigger point. Brendan is rescued by another hotshot crew while the others relocate to a safe zone, but the fire's speed and intensity continues to increase.

The wind picks up again, jumping Granite Mountain's safe zone; cutting them off from escape. Clearing a small site quickly, Eric attempts to douse the blaze with an overhead airtanker, but it misses the drop zone. The crew deploys under their fire shelters as the fire sweeps over them. Brendan listens into the radio traffic, and is devastated when a call finally comes in from the first responders who arrive at their shelters; all 19 of his crewmates have perished. Though the information is treated sensitively, rumors flare amongst the devastated families of what has happened. Brendan, being the sole survivor, demands to meet with them at the gather point at Prescott Middle School. Upon arriving, the families' worst fears are confirmed, with Brendan suffering a psychological breakdown due to survivors guilt. He is ultimately consoled by a grieving newly widowed Amanda.

Three years later, Amanda goes on a horseback ride with the horse she rescued earlier in the film watching over a series of horses from a nearby ridge. Brendan takes his daughter to the juniper tree Granite Mountain saved, now adorned as a memorial to the hotshots.

The end credits dedicate the film to the 19 fallen firefighters, displaying photos of the real hotshots alongside the actors who played them in the film, and notes that the Yarnell Hill Fire remains the largest loss of firefighter life in a single day since the September 11 attacks.

== Cast ==
- Josh Brolin as Eric Marsh
- Miles Teller as Brendan McDonough
- Jeff Bridges as Duane Steinbrink
- Jennifer Connelly as Amanda Marsh
- Andie MacDowell as Marvel Steinbrink
- Alex Russell as Andrew Ashcraft
- Dylan Kenin as Robert Caldwell
- Scott Foxx as Travis Carter
- Ryan Busch as Dustin DeFord
- Taylor Kitsch as Christopher MacKenzie
- Sam Quinn as Grant McKee
- Kenny Miller as Sean Misner
- Thad Luckinbill as Scott Norris
- Ben Hardy as Wade Parker
- Nicholas Jenks as John Percin Jr.
- Jake Picking as Anthony Rose
- James Badge Dale as Jesse Steed
- Matthew Van Wettering as Joe Thurston
- Geoff Stults as Travis Turbyfill
- Ryan Jason Cook as William Warneke
- Scott Haze as Clayton Whitted
- Michael McNulty as Kevin Woyjeck
- Brandon Bunch as Garret Zuppiger
- Brytnee Ratledge as Juliann Ashcraft
- Pell James as Claire Caldwell
- Natalie Hall as Natalie Johnson
- Jenny Gabrielle as Desiree Steed
- Barbie Robertson as Marsena Thurston
- Jade Kammerman as Stephanie Turbyfill
- Howard Ferguson Jr. as Brian Ferguson
- Rachel Singer as Brendan's mother
- Forrest Fyre as Mayor Worthington
- Ralph Alderman as Evaluator Hayes

== Production ==
On March 1, 2016, Josh Brolin and Miles Teller joined the cast of the film. Jeff Bridges and Taylor Kitsch later also joined the cast. The cast went through firefighter bootcamp to prepare for their roles.

The film was produced under the working title Granite Mountain. Principal photography on the film began in New Mexico on June 13, 2016. Filming took place at different locations in and around Santa Fe and Los Alamos.

Joseph Trapanese composed the film's score. Dierks Bentley released a single called "Hold The Light", featuring S. Carey. The single and the music video was released on October 6, 2017.

Cameraman James Razo suffered severe injuries while transporting equipment to a remote location used in the film. He sued the production companies, winning a $60 million payout in 2022, which is more than double what the film would gross at the box office.

== Release ==
Only the Brave was released on October 20, 2017, by Sony Pictures Releasing under its Columbia Pictures label. Before that the film was set a release date for September 22, 2017, but a disagreement between Lionsgate and production company Black Label Media saw the U.S. distribution rights change to Columbia Pictures. Summit Entertainment will retain international rights in select countries for the film. The trailer came out on July 19, and the film was retitled Only the Brave. The film was released digitally on January 23, 2018, and on DVD and Blu-ray on February 6, 2018. As of December 2018, it had made $7.2 million in home video sales.

== Accuracy ==
Some scenes in the film are added in for dramatic effect. For instance, Brendan McDonough was never bitten by a rattlesnake - which inadvertently caused him to be placed on lookout duty during the Yarnell Hill fire. In reality, McDonough was chosen for lookout in part because he had gone to a funeral and came down with the flu.

Brendan McDonough also didn't confront Eric Marsh about leaving in the manner in which it is portrayed. Brendan had considered transferring from wildland to structural firefighting in the past, but Eric stood by his decision, saying "Whatever you need to do for your daughter, you go ahead and do that. I support you fully."

The film depicts the families of the fallen Granite Mountain Hotshots learning about their deaths from Brendan inside a middle school gymnasium. The actual families learned from their own relatives or social media posts.

== Reception ==
=== Box office ===
Only the Brave grossed $18.3 million in the United States and Canada, and $7.4 million in other territories, for a worldwide total of $25.8 million, against a production budget of $38 million.

In the United States and Canada, Only the Brave was released alongside Boo 2! A Madea Halloween, The Snowman and Geostorm, and was expected to gross around $7 million from 2,575 theaters in its opening weekend. It made $305,000 from Thursday night previews and $2.1 million on its first day. It ended up debuting to $6 million, finishing 5th at the box office. In its second week the film dropped 42.5% to $3.4 million, finishing 7th.

=== Critical response ===
On review aggregator Rotten Tomatoes, the film has an approval rating of 87% based on 160 reviews, with an average rating of 7.09/10. The website's critical consensus reads, "Only the Brave's impressive veteran cast and affecting fact-based story add up to a no-frills drama that's just as stolidly powerful as the real-life heroes it honors." On Metacritic, which assigns a weighted average rating to reviews, the film has a weighted average score of 72 out of 100, based on 35 critics, indicating "generally favorable reviews". Audiences polled by CinemaScore gave the film an average grade of "A" on an A+ to F scale.

Bilge Ebiri of Village Voice wrote, "Only the Brave is a visually splendid, spellbinding, and surreal movie that also happens to be an emotionally shattering, over-the-top ugly-cry for the ages." Todd McCarthy of The Hollywood Reporter called the film "an engaging account of a tragic real-life story."

Richard Roeper of the Chicago Sun-Times gave the film 3.5 out of 4 stars, saying: "The blending of practical effects and CGI is impressive, and we come to understand the risks these men are taking, but some of the techniques and approaches they take remain a mystery, up to and through the climactic fire. Not that we need a manual to understand these men were working-class, everyday heroes." Scott Menzel of We Live Entertainment also praised the film, saying, "Only the Brave is without question the best firefighter film since Backdraft and one that pays tribute to the brave men that sacrificed their own lives to protect thousands of others."

Richard Brody noted in The New Yorker that "Only the Brave ties the characters’ private lives to their work lives in a plethora of details, but it never looks beyond the work life into life at large, or even into the life that surrounds them in their own home town." Brody described the film as a missed opportunity to depict those who battled local politicians to secure benefits for survivors of the Yarnell Hill Fire and the widows of the deceased Hotshots. The review quoted Fernanda Santos in The New York Times who wrote that "Juliann Ashcraft decided to leave Prescott altogether to spare her four children the discomfort of whispers and glares" — a reference to the harassment of women who challenged the decision to treat victims differently based on their employment status.

=== Accolades ===
List of awards and nominations
Award	Date of ceremony	Category	Recipients	Result	Ref.
Visual Effects Society Awards	February 13, 2018	Outstanding Supporting Visual Effects in a Photoreal Feature	Eric Barba, Dione Wood, Matthew Lane, Georg Kaltenbrunner, Michael Meinardus	Won	
Visual Effects Society Awards	February 13, 2018	Outstanding Effects Simulations in a Photoreal Feature	Georg Kaltenbrunner, Thomas Bevan, Philipp Zaufel, Himanshu Joshi for "Fire and Smoke"	Won	
