= WTO/99 =

2025 documentary film

- Film poster
- Directed by: Ian Bell
- Produced by: Ian Bell; Alex Megaro; Laura Tatham
- Edited by: Ian Bell; Alex Megaro
- Music by: Third Coast Percussion
- Production company: Foghorn Features
- Distributed by: Foghorn Features
- Release date: February 28, 2025 (True/False Film Festival)
- Running time: 102 minutes
- Country: United States
- Language: English

WTO/99 is a 2025 American documentary film about the 1999 Seattle WTO protests. The film is told entirely through archive footage. It is edited, produced, and directed by Ian Bell. It premiered at the True/False Film Festival in February 2025.

== Reception ==
=== Critical response ===
On the review aggregator website Rotten Tomatoes, 85% of 20 critics' reviews are positive, with an average rating of 6.9/10. Metacritic, which uses a weighted average, assigned the film a score of 63 out of 100, based on four critics, indicating "generally favorable" reviews.

Vikram Murthi of IndieWire gave the film a B+ and wrote, "The ominous tone WTO/99 slowly adopts suggests a perennial truth, one that becomes more frustrating as time marches on: We will witness history repeat itself again and again until we choose to learn from it."

=== Accolades ===
The film was nominated for Best Archival Documentary at the 10th Critics' Choice Documentary Awards.
