= Nathan McGuinness =

- Born: Nathan Paul McGuinness
- Occupation(s): Creative director Visual effects supervisor
- Years active: 1998–present
- Website: nathanmcguinness.com

Nathan Paul McGuinness is a creative director and visual effects supervisor. He was nominated for an Oscar for his work on the film Master and Commander: The Far Side of the World (2003) and won a BAFTA Award for his work on the film The Curious Case of Benjamin Button (2008).

== Selected filmography ==
- Black Hawk Down (2001)
- Pearl Harbor (2001)
- Planet of the Apes (2001)
- Bad Boys II (2003)
- Master and Commander: The Far Side of the World (2003)
- X2: X-Men United (2003)
- National Treasure (2004)
- Charlie and the Chocolate Factory (2005)
- King Kong (2005)
- Pirates of the Caribbean: Dead Man's Chest (2006)
- National Treasure: Book of Secrets (2007)
- Pirates of the Caribbean: At World's End (2007)
- Transformers (2007)
- The Curious Case of Benjamin Button (2008)
- The Taking of Pelham 1 2 3 (2009)
- Terminator Salvation (2009)
- Transformers: Revenge of the Fallen (2009)
- The Sorcerer's Apprentice (2010)
- Unstoppable (2010)
- Battleship (2012)
- Fast & Furious 6 (2013)
- Transcendence (2014)
