= Edson Williams =

Visual effects supervisor

- Born: October 30, 1966 (age 59); Anchorage, Alaska
- Occupation: visual effects supervisor
- Years active: 1982-present

Edson Williams (born October 30, 1966) is a visual effects supervisor. Williams and his fellow visual effects artists are nominated for an Academy Award for Best Visual Effects for the 2013 film The Lone Ranger.

== Selected filmography ==
- The Lone Ranger (2013; co-nominated with Tim Alexander, Gary Brozenich and John Frazier)
