= Donnie Dean =

American special effects artist

- Occupation: Special effects artist

Donnie Dean is an American special effects artist. He was nominated for an Academy Award in the category Best Visual Effects for the film Sinners.

In addition to his Academy Award nomination, he won a Primetime Emmy Award in the category Outstanding Special Visual Effects for his work on the television program American Horror Story: Freak Show. His win was shared with Jason Piccioni, Justin Ball, Jason C. Spratt, Tim Jacobsen, David Altenau, Tommy Tran, Michael Kirylo and Matt Lefferts.

== Selected filmography ==
- Sinners (2025; co-nominated with Michael Ralla, Espen Nordahl and Guido Wolter)
