= Espen Nordahl =

Norwegian visual effects artist

- Occupation: Visual effects artist

Espen Nordahl is a Norwegian visual effects artist. He was nominated for an Academy Award in the category Best Visual Effects for the film Sinners.

In addition to his Academy Award nomination, he won a Primetime Emmy Award in the category Outstanding Special Visual Effects for his work on the television program The Last of Us. His win was shared with Alex Wang, Sean Nowlan, Joel Whist, Stephen James, Nick Marshall, Simon Jung, Dennis Yoo and Jonathan Mitchell.

== Selected filmography ==
- Sinners (2025; co-nominated with Michael Ralla, Guido Wolter and Donnie Dean)
