= Michael Ralla =

American visual effects artist

- Occupation: Visual effects artist

Michael Ralla is an American visual effects artist. He was nominated for an Academy Award in the category Best Visual Effects for the film Sinners.

== Selected filmography ==
- Sinners (2025; co-nominated with Espen Nordahl, Guido Wolter and Donnie Dean)
