= Georg Kaltenbrunner =

American visual effects artist

- Occupation: Visual effects artist
- Years active: 2008-present

Georg Kaltenbrunner is a visual effects artist, who has won two Annie Awards.

He won a 2017 Annie Award in Outstanding Achievement, Animated Effects in a Live Action Production for his work on Doctor Strange. Kaltenbrunner won the award along with Michael Marcuzzi, Thomas Bevan, Andrew Graham and Jihyun Yoon. It marked his second consecutive win of an Annie in this category.

== Selected filmography ==
- Avengers: Age of Ultron (2015)
- Doctor Strange (2016)
- Only the Brave (2017)
