= Eric Barba =

Visual effects supervisor

- Occupation: Visual Effects Supervisor
- Years active: 1993-present
- Spouse: Roma Barba 1990 - present
- Children: Nicolette Barba & Cole Barba

Eric Barba is a visual effects supervisor for television, film, and commercial advertising.

After studying at the Art Center College of Design, Barba began his career at Steven Spielberg's Amblin Imaging as a digital artist on SeaQuest 2032 and Sliders. In 1996, he joined Digital Domain as a digital artist on The Fifth Element, before working his way to CG supervisor on Supernova and finally to visual effects supervisor for David Fincher's Zodiac.

Barba earned a reputation for high end visual effects, working closely with directors like Fincher and Joseph Kosinski on both film and advertising projects, as well as directing commercials himself for Nike, American Express, and Honda.

He won at the 81st Academy Awards for the film The Curious Case of Benjamin Button, in the category of Best Visual Effects. He shared his Oscar with Craig Barron, Burt Dalton and Steve Preeg.

In 2013, Barba was promoted to Chief Creative Office/Senior Visual Effects Supervisor at Digital Domain 3.0, the latest iteration of the visual effects studio. Barba continued to oversee the company's Los Angeles studio until leaving Digital Domain to operate as a freelance visual effects supervisor in 2015.

== Filmography ==
- Alien: Romulus (2024)
- The Killer (2023)
- Terminator: Dark Fate (2019)
- Only the Brave (2017)
- Gone Girl (2014)
- Oblivion (2013)
- The Girl with the Dragon Tattoo (2011)
- TRON: Legacy (2010)
- The Curious Case of Benjamin Button (2008)
- Zodiac (2007)
- Rules of Engagement (2000)
- Supernova (2000)
- The Fifth Element (1997)
- Red Corner (1997)
