= Bolt (Disney character) =

Disney character

- Bolt character
- Bolt as he appears in Disney's Bolt (2008)
- First appearance: Bolt (2008)
- First game: Bolt (2008)
- Created by: Dan Fogelman; Chris Williams; Byron Howard; Joe Moshier
- Voiced by: John Travolta; Frank Welker (vocal effects)

In-universe information
- Species: Dog
- Gender: Male
- Occupation: Actor (retired)
- Family: Penny Forrester (owner); Mittens (fellow pet); Rhino (fellow pet)
- Nationality: American

Bolt is the main character and the titular protagonist of Walt Disney Animation Studios' 2008 film Bolt. He is depicted as a White Shepherd with superpowers such as a "super bark" and the ability to shoot lasers from his eyes. When he found himself lost, Bolt discovered that he was an actor in a television show, and must take it upon himself to get back home, learning how to be a normal dog in the process. Bolt's journey and personal evolution as a character are core to the film's main themes.

Created by Chris Williams and Byron Howard, Bolt is introduced as a dog who is unknowingly the star of his own TV show. His ignorance is crucial as the cast and crew go to extreme lengths to make Bolt think he is actually a super dog in order to make the performance more authentic.

The character is voiced by John Travolta. Much of the inspiration for Bolt was provided by John Lasseter, who also oversaw his visual development with chief character designer Joe Moshier. Aside from the film, the character also appears in the direct-to-video short film Super Rhino, the two video games Bolt and Disney Infinity, and the Sorcerers of the Magic Kingdom trade card role-playing game. In addition, photos of Bolt appear in Wreck-It Ralph (2012) and Big Hero 6 (2014).

Bolt's character, alongside Travolta's vocal performance, has received mostly positive reviews from film critics and became a breakout character, leading to strong sales of merchandise and toys following the film's release.

== Development ==
=== Characterization and design ===
Early concept art of Bolt

The character known as Bolt was originally conceptualized as a bipedal Jack Russell Terrier named Henry, designed by Chris Sanders. In this script, Henry would be aware of the fact that he is an actor. Henry, as well as Sander's idea for the movie, was eventually scrapped when John Lasseter and some colleagues from Pixar reviewed the project. The character was subsequently redesigned after a White Spitz Breed, although changes were done to the muzzle, ears, and overall body structure to give the character a more distinctive and expressive appearance.

Some aspects of his design, such as his distinctive ears, were inspired by American White Shepherds in order to emphasize his expressiveness. To make Bolt's movement seem more realistic and in line with that of real canines, the animation department studied the body language and locomotion of real white shepherds and utilized virtual bone-structure in the CGI models. Personality-wise, the new Bolt would be more naïve and insecure, conveying more pathos than Henry. At the same time, the art department worked to give Bolt a whimsical nature with a pose that excels confidence, thus allowing the character to have a contrasting personality and body language which reflects that.

=== Voice work ===
John Travolta was chosen to do the voice work for Bolt, after Jim Carrey, Robin Williams and Tom Cruise turned down the role. Despite a history of turning down voice-over offers for animated characters, Travolta agreed to provide the voice for Bolt as he, according to the actor himself, "indicated he was the right character". In an interview with CBS, Travolta explained that he was intrigued with Bolt's personality after reading the script. "When I read this script and saw this character, so guileless, so kind of naïve and fun and touching I just said to myself; maybe this is the one to do".

While recording the dialogue for Bolt, animators would film Travolta's facial expressions and use them when sketching the storyboard and animating Bolt's mimics. Travolta took inspiration for his performance from earlier action films such as Broken Arrow and Face/Off, mixing it up with a certain naiveté and guilelessness suitable for Bolt's character.

=== Physical appearance ===
Bolt's breed is not specified in the movie but the animators based him on the White Swiss Shepherd Dog, his big, erect ears and long, bushy tail being the most prominent indicators. Most of the time, his ears are standing vigilantly erect over his head which matches his intent personality and sharp profile and allowed the animators to emphasize his expressiveness as they leave his face uncovered.

Bolt is portrayed as a medium-sized dog with a height at the wither of 50 centimeters and a creamy white coat. Bolt has a strong neck with thick, double-coated fur, which is raised when excited and lowered while running, much like a real shepherd dog. The difference between Bolt's back head and neck is not very defined. Bolt's appearance is designed to be "softer" than a real German Shepherd with a more curved outline, thick, rounded legs and domed forehead. The "normal" Shepherd has longer, thinner legs and a more meager appearance.

Bolt's coat is a creamy white and his fur differs in thickness as it is short haired over his belly, flanks and back, and a bit thicker over his neck. The animators worked much with Bolt's fur so that it would seem soft and fluffy with every hair moving in a realistic way. Special animation software was used by the production team to animate and render Bolt's more than 200,000 hairs. During the making of the movie, having Bolt's white fur getting smudged and dirty was a challenge, according to the animators.

=== Breed ===
There has been some disagreement as to whether Bolt is a White Shepherd (as suggested by early promotional material where he was erroneously referred to as a German Shepherd) or a Berger Blanc Suisse. Supporting this theory is the fact that the Blanc Suisse variate tend to be smaller with a more square-cut muzzle which aligns more with Bolt's in-movie appearance. Bolt's breed is never mentioned in the film. Joe Moshier, Bolt's main character designer, has indicated that Bolt is loosely based on a white German Shepherd puppy the animation team studied during the character's early design phase, but was never intended to be any one specific breed.

== Appearances ==
=== Films ===
==== Bolt ====
A White Swiss Shepherd puppy named Bolt is adopted by a girl named Penny. Five years later, Bolt and a 12-year-old Penny star in a hit television series called Bolt, in which they fight crime with Bolt using various superpowers to protect Penny from the villain, Dr. Calico, who kidnapped Penny's father. To gain a more realistic performance, the show's producers have deceived Bolt his entire life, arranging the filming in such a way that Bolt believes everything in the show is real and that he really has superpowers including a devastatingly powerful sonic scream-like "super bark". After a cliffhanger episode causes Bolt to believe Penny has been kidnapped, he escapes from his on-set trailer in Hollywood, but knocks himself unconscious in the process and is trapped inside a box of foam peanuts being accidentally shipped to New York City.

In New York, Bolt resumes his search for Penny. Much to his dismay and confusion, he finds out the hard way that his "superpowers" are useless. He met three friendly pigeons who tell him that there is an animal close to Calico. Bolt encounters Mittens, a cynical female feral cat who bullies pigeons out of their food. Believing that Mittens is an “agent” of Calico, Bolt holds her over the freeway, but Mittens decides to help him. To prevent Mittens from escaping, Bolt ties her to him with a leash and forces her to guide him back to Penny. Mittens is convinced her captor is a lunatic, but the two start their journey westward to Ohio by truck. Meanwhile, in Hollywood, Penny is genuinely distraught over Bolt’s disappearance but her agent agrees to find Bolt.

Surprised at his first feelings of hunger, Bolt is shown by Mittens how to act like a cute but needy dog, obtaining food for them both at an RV park. They are joined by Rhino, a fearless hamster and huge Bolt fanatic. Rhino's unwavering faith in Bolt substantiates the dog's illusions about himself, and they resume the journey. After a train stunt, Bolt allows Mittens to figure out he is from a television show. She tries to tell Bolt this, but Bolt simply becomes frustrated as everything he believed to be real starts to crumble around him. Attempting to "superbark" her repeatedly, the noise draws the attention of Animal Control and Bolt and Mittens are both captured and taken to an animal shelter.

Bolt, badly damaged by himself and freed from the patrol van by Rhino, finally realizes and accepts that he is just a normal dog. However, he regains his confidence after Rhino (oblivious to this revelation) exhorts him to heroism, they set off to find Mittens alone. Meanwhile, in Hollywood, a less-experienced Bolt look-alike is brought in so filming can resume. Penny realized that the dog is not Bolt, but reluctantly agrees to halt the search so production can continue. Bolt and Rhino arrive at the shelter and rescue Mittens and as they continue west, Bolt and Mittens form a close friendship in which she teaches Bolt how to be an ordinary dog and enjoy typical dog activities.

Days later, Bolt now got his chance, but Mittens makes plans for the three of them to stay in Las Vegas, but Bolt is still drawn to find Penny. Mittens tells him that Penny is only an actor and that humans never truly love their pets because eventually they will betray and abandon them as it happened to her. Bolt refuses to believe her and continues on alone to Hollywood by truck, but Rhino tells Mittens that Bolt is gone and encourages her to stand by him as friends and they follow shortly after.

Bolt reaches the studio and finds Penny embracing his look-alike, unaware that Penny still misses him and her affection for the lookalike is only a part of a rehearsal. A broken-hearted Bolt leaves, but Mittens sees Penny telling her mother how much she misses Bolt. Mittens follows Bolt and explains. At the same time, the Bolt look-alike panics during the show's filming of Calico capturing Penny and her father and accidentally knocks over some flaming torches, setting the sound stage on fire with Penny trapped inside. Bolt, refusing to let Penny die, leaves Mittens and Rhino outside, he went in to save Penny and the two reunite inside the burning studio, but are unable to escape before Penny begins to suffocate from the smoke. Penny begs Bolt to go, but Bolt refuses to leave her. Bolt uses his "super bark" through the building's air vent, alerting the firefighters to their location and allowing both of them to be rescued in time.

Penny and her mother quit when their agent proposes they exploit the incident for publicity purposes. The show continues with a replacement "Bolt" and "Penny" and a bizarre new storyline involving alien abduction. Penny adopts Mittens and Rhino as she and her family move to a rural home to enjoy a simpler, happy lifestyle with Bolt and her new pets.

==== Super Rhino ====
Penny and Bolt are both kidnapped by the evil Dr. Calico, suspended above a pool of lava, inside a heavily guarded warehouse on an island in the middle of nowhere – a base which is impenetrable to both people and dogs. Penny's father watches the events from his lab through a secret camera embedded in Bolt's collar and worries that he cannot save her. Discovering that no man or dog can break into Dr. Calico's base, he turns to Rhino, who is watching TV in the background. In order to save Penny and Bolt, Rhino is put through the same procedure as Bolt to give him super-powers.

Rhino uses his newly found powers to fly across the sea and crash-land outside the armed base encased in his ball. Rhino's battle with the guard is witnessed by Penny, Bolt and Dr. Calico from the inside, with helicopters and cars crashing into the side of the building. As all the noise subsides a single knock on the door is heard and not receiving an answer Rhino uses his heat-vision to create an opening in the wall.

Rhino then uses his eye-beams to defeat the armed guards and commandeers a flying missile, riding it like a surfboard to aim at Dr. Calico. Rhino uses his super squeak ability to finish the villain off. With Penny and Bolt saved, Rhino walks away.

Rhino is next seen on stage performing "The Best of Both Worlds"; the theme song from Hannah Montana (by Miley Cyrus), where it is revealed that Rhino has been dreaming his adventures all along. Mittens wakes him up, telling him that she's not a fan of his singing. The short ends with another dream sequence, this time about Rhino being selected by the President to defeat Calico once again.

=== Video games ===
Bolt is featured in Disney Interactive Studios' 2008 video game of the same name, and is a playable character in the Disney games Sorcerers of the Magic Kingdom and Disney Heroes: Battle Mode.

=== Cameo appearances ===
Bolt has made minor cameo appearances in various animated feature films and short films including Wreck-It Ralph, Big Hero 6, Frozen II, and Once Upon a Studio. A slightly altered version of Bolt's CGI animation rig appears briefly in the opening of Disney's 2009 television special Prep & Landing.

== Reception and cultural impact ==
=== Critical reviews ===
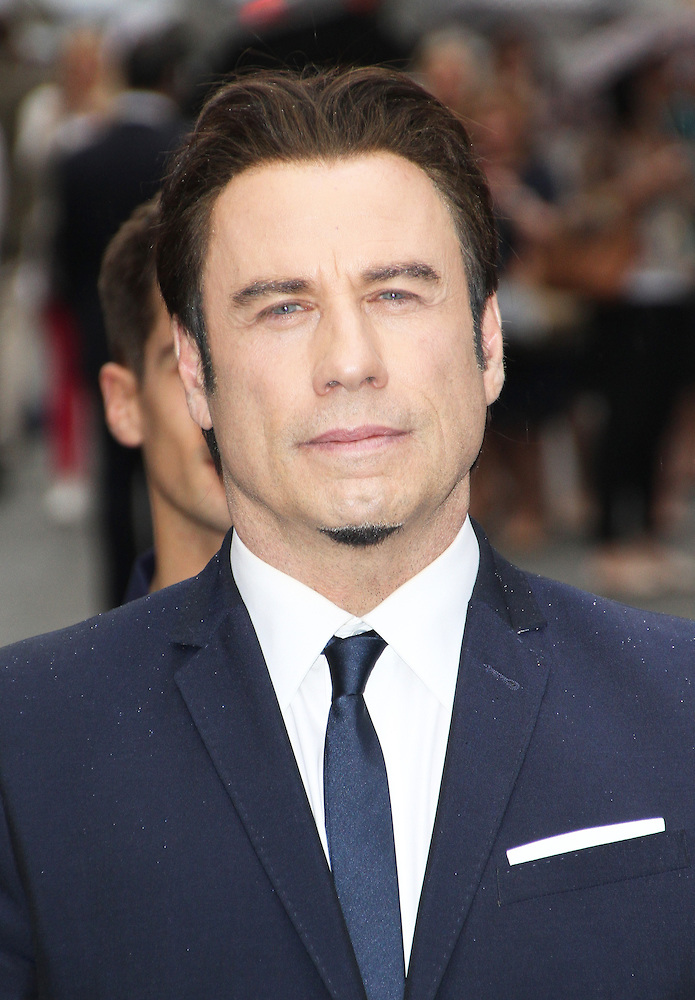
John Travolta's performance as Bolt has received praise.

The character was met with generally positive critical reception with critics praising the animators' work with his body language, as well as Bolt's personality and expressiveness. A. O. Scott, writer for The New York Times said that "Bolt is a cute enough little fellow and a winning personality and a nice voice" and that "his physical gestures and expressions turn him into a memorable, irresistible character". A critic for the Daily Express wrote that "the wonderfully expressive features on Bolt make him feel almost real".

Many reviews praised the detailed and realistic animation of Bolt. British newspaper The Daily Telegraph wrote that "Bolt's fur is startlingly real, and animal gestures are faithfully reproduced: Bolt savaging his favorite plastic toy, raising a front paw slightly when he hears a distant unidentified sound". Movie critic Brian Tallerico wrote "Bolt is DAMN cute and shockingly well-rendered when it comes to his always moving hair". Many critics also praised John Travolta's voice work with Bolt, such as Jeffrey M. Anderson who complimented Travolta's "earnest and gentle voice performance". Colin Covert, writer for StarTribune.com, wrote that "The dog's expressions are heart-rending as well as hilarious, and Travolta's vocal performance is utterly winning".

Other critics noted on the important values embodied by the character's process towards self-realization. "Bolt's disastrous attempts at using his powers off the set get laughs at first, but they give way to important lessons about accepting your limitations while still believing you are special." wrote Sean O'Connell from FilmCritic.com.

Josh Taylor from CinemaBlend, wrote "This is a beautiful, big, epic story constructed for the sole purpose of saying something incredibly simple and emotional. Your dog loves you. Go home and give him a hug".

Bolt was included as the "recommended pet dog" in FilmCritic.com list of "The best Fantasy Creatures”.

=== Cultural impact ===
Shortly after the movie's release, a "Superbark Contest" took place in Finsbury Park, England. Inspired by the titular character's iconic super bark, dozens of owners rounded up their dogs to try to break the record for loudest bark in history. More than 50 dogs participated and a representative from Guinness World Records was on hand to oversee the contest. A white American Shepherd dog, who was handpicked due to his striking resemblance to Bolt, broke the record with 108 decibels and became a Guinness World Record holder. Disney's Gavin Quirk was quoted saying: "The Big Bolt Bark has brought pride to the nation."

Since 2009, the Bolt character has been spotted semi-regularly at the Walt Disney World Resort in Florida.
