= Glago's Guest =

- Poster
- Directed by: Chris Williams
- Written by: Chris Williams; Michael LaBash
- Produced by: Chuck Williams
- Starring: Randy Savage
- Edited by: Dan Molina
- Music by: Jon Brion
- Production company: Walt Disney Animation Studios
- Distributed by: Walt Disney Studios; Motion Pictures
- Release date: June 10, 2008
- Running time: 6 minutes
- Country: United States

Glago's Guest is a 2008 animated short film produced by Walt Disney Animation Studios and directed by Chris Williams. The film premiered at the Annecy International Animated Film Festival on June 10, 2008.

== Plot ==
The short depicts a lone Russian soldier, Glago, stationed in a remote Siberian outpost in the middle of the frozen tundra. Glago's uneventful daily routine consists of manning the outpost, observing the horizon through his binoculars, and having dull, candlelit meals day in and day out.

One day, Glago's routine is broken when he hears a strange sound coming from above and looks up, only to witness a colossal, black oval-shaped object descending from the sky and landing in front of the outpost. A door suddenly opens, revealing alien lifeforms similar to a mass of translucent-green orbs piled together.

Panicking, Glago rushes out of the outpost and loads his rifle to confront the aliens. Just then, the aliens rush towards Glago, who retreats back inside, and cluster around the base of the outpost before lifting it up and rolling away with it, with Glago still inside.

As Glago tumbles helplessly within, the aliens eventually set the outpost down some ways away. Determined to fight for his life, Glago rushes outside and takes aim at one of the aliens. Before he can shoot, however, Glago suddenly witnesses a meteor fall from the sky and strike the very same spot his outpost was originally on, reducing the ground to a smoking crater.

As a shocked Glago approaches the crater, one of the alien blobs separates from the group and approaches him. Realizing that the aliens were not trying to attack the outpost but were moving it out of the meteor's path to save his life, Glago is overjoyed and gratefully gives his cossack hat to the alien.

After the alien mass (credited as 'Lars' by the animators) returns to the ship and ascends back to space, Glago happily dances in the snow.

== Production ==
John Lasseter was so impressed with director Chris Williams' work on this short that he gave him the job of co-directing (with Byron Howard) the animated film Bolt.

== Release ==
The film premiered at the Annecy International Animated Film Festival on June 10, 2008, and was originally expected to be released theatrically preceding the Disney animated feature film Bolt. The short is believed not to have tested well with audiences, and the spot with Bolt was eventually taken by Pixar's Cars Toons short Tokyo Mater.

It was included in the Animation Show of Shows in 2008.

As of 2026, the short has no home video release and is not on Disney+. In December 2023, a copy of the short emerged on the Internet Archive, ripped from a "For Your Consideration" screener disc.

== See also ==
- Animated-news.com (June 23, 2008); "Please welcome Glago's Guest"; Animated News
- Barbara Robertson (February 2009); "Short Subjects, Big Ideas"; Computer Graphics World
