= Super Rhino =

- Directed by: Nathan Greno
- Written by: Nathan Greno
- Produced by: Clark Spencer
- Starring: Mark Walton; Miley Cyrus; Susie Essman; Malcolm McDowell; Sean Donnellan
- Edited by: Shannon Stein
- Music by: John Powell
- Production company: Walt Disney Animation Studios
- Distributed by: Walt Disney Studios; Motion Pictures
- Release dates: March 22, 2009 (with Bolt DVD & Blu-Ray)
- Running time: 4 minutes
- Language: English

Super Rhino is a 2009 American animated comedy direct-to-video short film, produced by Walt Disney Animation Studios and starring the characters from feature film Bolt. Directed by Nathan Greno, the short film picks up sometime after the conclusion of Bolt. The excitable and TV obsessed hamster Rhino finds out his friends Penny and Bolt have been kidnapped. Rhino has to save them from the evil Dr. Calico. The short inspires Bolt: The Video Game and is a spin-off to the fictional TV show featuring Bolt.

Super Rhino was included in the 2009 DVD and Blu-Ray release of Bolt. This was Randy Savage's final acting role before his death in 2011.

== Plot ==
Bolt and Penny have been kidnapped by Dr. Calico, muffled and suspended above a pool of lava, inside a heavily guarded warehouse on an island in the middle of nowhere – a base which is impenetrable to both people and dogs. Penny's father watches the events from his lab through a secret camera embedded in Bolt's collar and worries that he cannot save her. Discovering that no man or dog can break into Dr. Calico's base, he turns to Rhino, who is watching television in the background. In order to save Bolt and Penny, Rhino is put through the same process as Bolt to give him super-powers.

Rhino uses his newly found powers to fly across the sea and crash-land outside the armed base encased in his ball. Rhino's battle with the guard is witnessed by Bolt, Penny, and Dr. Calico from the inside, with helicopters and cars crashing into the side of the building. As all the noise subsides a single knock on the door is heard and not receiving an answer Rhino uses his heat-vision to create an opening in the wall.

On the inside, Dr. Calico asks Rhino who he is, and Rhino introduces himself, to which Calico incredulously responds, "Rhino? The hamster?". Rhino then explains that his ancestry is not all hamster and that he is one-sixteenth wolf with a little wolverine. Calico interrupts, "We're done here." and sends his henchmen to kill Rhino. Rhino uses his eye-beams to defeat the armed guards and commandeers a flying missile, riding it like a surfboard to aim at Dr. Calico, though the missile misses. As Calico monologues, Rhino says, "We're done here." (like Calico did earlier) and uses his super squeak ability to finish Calico off, leaving the burnt-out doctor confused. Penny congratulates Rhino for saving them. Rhino chuckles and tells Bolt and Penny they are so cute. With Bolt and Penny saved, Rhino walks away, saying he has an urgent matter to attend to.

Rhino is next seen on stage performing "The Best of Both Worlds"; the theme song from Hannah Montana (by star Miley Cyrus), where it is revealed that Rhino has been dreaming his adventures all along. Mittens wakes him up, telling him she is not a fan of his singing. The short ends with another dream sequence, this time about Rhino being selected by the President to defeat Calico once again.

== Cast ==
- Mark Walton as Rhino
- Miley Cyrus as Penny
- Susie Essman as Mittens
- Malcolm McDowell as Dr. Calico
- Sean Donnellan as Penny's TV Dad
- Randy Savage as Thug

== See also ==
- List of Disney Animated Shorts and Featurettes
- Walt Disney Animation Studios
