= Chris Williams (director) =

American-Canadian animator, film director and screenwriter

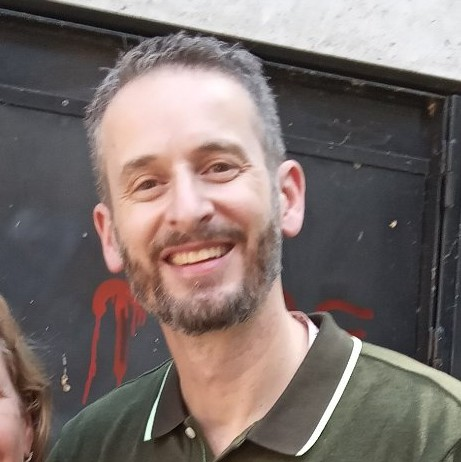
- Williams in 2022
- Born: Missouri, U.S.
- Education: University of Waterloo; Sheridan College
- Occupations: Animator, film director, screenwriter, voice actor
- Years active: 1996–present
- Employer(s): Walt Disney Animation Studios (1998–2018); Netflix (2018–present)
- Notable work: Glago's Guest; Bolt; Big Hero 6 Moana; The Sea Beast
- Awards: Academy Award for Best Animated Feature; Big Hero 6 (2014)

Chris Williams is an American-Canadian animation film director, screenwriter and voice actor who is best known for directing the films Bolt (2008) and Big Hero 6 (2014) and co-directing the film Moana (2016) for Walt Disney Animation Studios, and for directing the film The Sea Beast (2022) for Netflix Animation.

== Early life ==
Williams was born in Missouri and spent the first 25 years of his life in Kitchener, Ontario, Canada, where his father was the director of Counselling Services at the University of Waterloo. Williams graduated from the University of Waterloo with a degree in Fine Arts and then enrolled in the animation program at Sheridan College, Oakville, Ontario. Upon graduation from Sheridan, he was recruited by Disney and moved to Los Angeles.

== Career ==
Williams previously worked in the story department for Mulan (1998), The Emperor's New Groove (2000) and Frozen (2013), in which he also voiced the character Oaken. In February 2007, it was announced he would direct American Dog, which was re-titled Bolt (2008) and was later joined by Byron Howard, both of them replaced Chris Sanders who was the original director.

In July 2010, it was reported by various sources that Williams would direct King of the Elves based on the story by Philip K. Dick. However, in 2012, it was revealed that Williams had joined another Walt Disney Animation film, Big Hero 6, as a director inspired by the Marvel Comics of the same name, alongside Don Hall.

In November 2018, it was reported that Williams had left Disney and he would write and direct The Sea Beast for Netflix. The Sea Beast was released on Netflix on July 8, 2022.

== Filmography ==
=== Feature films ===
Year	Film	Credited as						
Year	Film	Director	Writer	Producer	Story Artist	Other	Voice	Notes
1998	Mulan	No	No	No	Yes	No		
2000	The Emperor's New Groove	No	Story	No	Yes	No		
2002	Lilo & Stitch	No	No	No	Yes	No		Head of Story
2003	Brother Bear	No	No	No	No	Yes		Additional Story
2005	Chicken Little	No	No	No	Yes	No		
2007	Meet the Robinsons	No	No	No	Additional	No		
2008	Bolt	Yes	Screenplay	No	No	Yes	Additional Voices	Disney Story Trust - uncredited
2009	The Princess and the Frog	No	No	No	No	No		Disney Story Trust - uncredited
2010	Tangled	No	No	No	Additional	No		Disney Story Trust - uncredited
2011	Winnie the Pooh	No	No	No	No	No		Disney Story Trust - uncredited
2012	Wreck-It Ralph	No	No	No	Additional	No		Disney Story Trust - uncredited
2013	Frozen	No	No	No	Yes	Yes	Oaken	Disney Story Trust - uncredited
2014	Big Hero 6	Yes	No	No	No	Yes		Creative Leadership
2016	Zootopia	No	No	No	No	Yes		Additional Story, Creative Leadership
2016	Moana	Co-Director	Story	No	No	Yes		Creative Leadership
2018	Ralph Breaks the Internet	No	No	Executive	Additional	Yes		Creative Leadership
2019	Frozen II	No	No	No	Yes	Yes	Oaken (uncredited)	
2021	Raya and the Last Dragon	No	No	No	No	Yes		Additional Story
2022	The Sea Beast	Yes	Yes	Yes	No	No		Netflix Original Film

==== Shorts and TV ====
Year	Title	Director	Writer	Executive Producer	Other	Voice	Notes
2008	Glago's Guest	Yes	Yes	No	No		
2009	Super Rhino	No	No	Yes	No		
2009	Prep & Landing	No	Story	Yes	No		TV special
2015	Frozen Fever	No	No	No	Yes	Oaken	
2016	LEGO Frozen: Northern Lights	No	No	No	Yes	Oaken	Episode: "Journey to the Lights"
2017	Gone Fishing	Co-Director	No	No	No		
2017	Olaf's Frozen Adventure	No	No	No	Yes	Oaken	Featurette
2020	Once Upon a Snowman	No	No	No	Yes	Oaken	Disney+ Original Short Film

==== Other credits ====
Year	Title	Role
2012	Paperman	Special Thanks
2020	The Willoughbys	Special Thanks
2022	Strange World	Very Special Thanks
2023	Nimona	Special Thanks
2024	Moana 2	Special Thanks - Gratitude (as “Chris”)
2025	The Twits	Special Thanks
2025	In Your Dreams	Special Thanks

== See also ==
- List of University of Waterloo people
