= Mark Walton (story artist) =

American storyboard artist and voice actor

- Born: Mark Daniel Walton; October 24, 1968 (age 58); Salt Lake City, Utah, U.S.
- Occupations: Storyboard artist, voice actor, writer, animator
- Years active: 1995–present
- Employers: Walt Disney Animation Studios (1995–2009); DreamWorks Animation (2010–2012); Blue Sky Studios (2012); Marza Animation Planet (2013); Patchwork Entertainment (2014–2015); Ken Duncan Studios (2015); RGH Entertainment (2015–2016); Mass Animation (2016); Original Force 3D (2016); Rovio Entertainment (2016–2017); On Animation (2017–2018); Skydance Animation (2018–present); Kool Produktion AS (2018–2019); Warner Animation Group (2018–2019); Illumination (2023–present)
- Spouse: Morgane (2012–present)
- Children: 3

Mark Daniel Walton (born October 24, 1968) is an American storyboard artist, voice actor, writer, and animator who has worked for Walt Disney Animation Studios, DreamWorks Animation, Blue Sky Studios, Warner Animation Group, and other companies. He currently works for Illumination, as of 2023. Walton also voiced Rhino the hamster in the 2008 animated film Bolt.

== Early life ==
Walton was born Mark Daniel Walton in Salt Lake City, Utah, on October 24, 1968, the oldest of seven children.

Although not a professional actor, Walton said in an interview, "I liked acting in high school and college. I enjoyed it. I think at some point, I decided that if I was really going to be a professional actor that it would take at least everything that I would have emotionally or physically and I knew that I really wanted to pursue art."

In 1998, he graduated from Utah State University with a degree in illustration.

== Career ==
In 1995, Walton started at Walt Disney Feature Animation Florida as a story and animation intern. After performing as a show artist for The Hunchback of Notre Dame Musical Discovery Adventure North American Mall Tour in 1996, he transferred to Walt Disney Feature Animation in Burbank, California (now known as Walt Disney Animation Studios) in 1997 to work on his first feature Tarzan as a storyboard artist. While at Disney, from the late 1990s and throughout the 2000s, he did storyboards for The Emperor's New Groove, The Little Matchstick Girl, Home on the Range, Chicken Little, Meet the Robinsons, Tangled, and Gnomeo and Juliet, as well as storyboarding and developing the unproduced films Wild Life, My Peoples, and Rapunzel Unbraided (an early version of Tangled), Joe Jump, and King of the Elves. Also, while at Disney, he provided the voices for Barry & Bob the Longhorns in Home on the Range (2004), Goosey Loosey for Chicken Little and its video game (2005), and for Rhino the hamster in Bolt (2008) for which he was nominated for an Annie Award for Voice Acting in a Feature Production, and the short film spin-off Super Rhino. He also storyboarded a short CGI film "The Zit" for Mike Blum's Pipsqueak Films, shown on the TV series Independent Lens. After leaving Disney in 2009, Walton storyboarded on films for DreamWorks Animation, Blue Sky Studios, Marza Animation Planet, Original Force 3D, Ken Duncan Studio, Mass Animation, On Animation, Kool Produktion AS, Rovio Animation, and Warner Animation Group. He has also taught storyboarding at California Institute of the Arts (Cal Arts), Academy of Art, SUU, and CGMA

Numerous positive reviews came from film critics regarding Walton's performance as Rhino in Bolt. CNN noted “Walton's Rhino steals every scene he's in.”, while Enewsi stated "Walton has perfect comedic timing as Rhino". Another reviewer noted “The hamster alone is enough to make this movie worth seeing”, with other positive reviews featured in the New York Times and the Los Angeles Times, where Walton contemplated Rhino's popularity as, "he imagines he's actually something bigger and more powerful to match his big heart and big dreams -- which can't be contained by his little hamster body."

== Personal life ==
Walton was raised in Salt Lake City, Utah, where he grew up alongside six younger siblings. He spent 18 years living and working in Southern California to pursue his Hollywood animation career before deciding to relocate back to his hometown.

Walton resides in a historic home in the Avenues neighborhood of Salt Lake City, located one block away from his childhood home and directly across the street from the elementary school he attended as a child. The home originally belonged to longtime family friends before Walton's own children later came to occupy the same space.

In 2012, he married Morgane, a native of Nice, France. The couple has three daughters, two of which are named Moira and Olivia. Outside of his studio animation work, Walton also works as an art and storyboarding educator, teaching courses for institutions such as the California Institute of the Arts (CalArts) and Academy of Art University.

== Filmography ==
Year	Film	Role	Notes
1989	Psycho Cop	Cinematographer	
1999	Tarzan	Storyboard Artist	
2000	The Emperor's New Groove	Additional Storyboard Artist	
2004	Home on the Range	Storyboard Artist	Voice of Barry & Bob, the Longhorns
2005	Chicken Little	Storyboard Artist	Voice of Goosey Loosey
2007	Meet the Robinsons	Storyboard and Visual Development Artist	
2008	Bolt	Voice of Rhino the Hamster	Nominated—Annie Award for Voice Acting in a Feature Production
2009	Super Rhino	Voice of Rhino the Hamster	Short film
2010	Donkey's Christmas Shrektacular	Story Artist	
2011	Gnomeo & Juliet	Story Artist	
2011	The Pig Who Cried Werewolf	Story Artist	
2011	Thriller Night	Story Artist	
2013	Epic	Additional Storyboard Artist	
2013	Turbo	Additional Storyboard Artist	Voice of Racing Official
2014	Rio 2	Additional Storyboard Artist	
2014	Rocky and Bullwinkle	Storyboard Artist	Animated short film
2018	Duck Duck Goose	Storyboard Artist	
2018	Next Gen	Additional Story Material	
2019	Playmobil: The Movie	Storyboard Artist	
2022	DC League of Super-Pets		Voice of Topo the Octopus (Deleted scenes)
2023	The Super Mario Bros. Movie	Storyboard Artist	
2023	Once Upon a Studio	Voice of Rhino the Hamster	Archival recording
