= White Swiss Shepherd Dog =

Swiss breed of dog

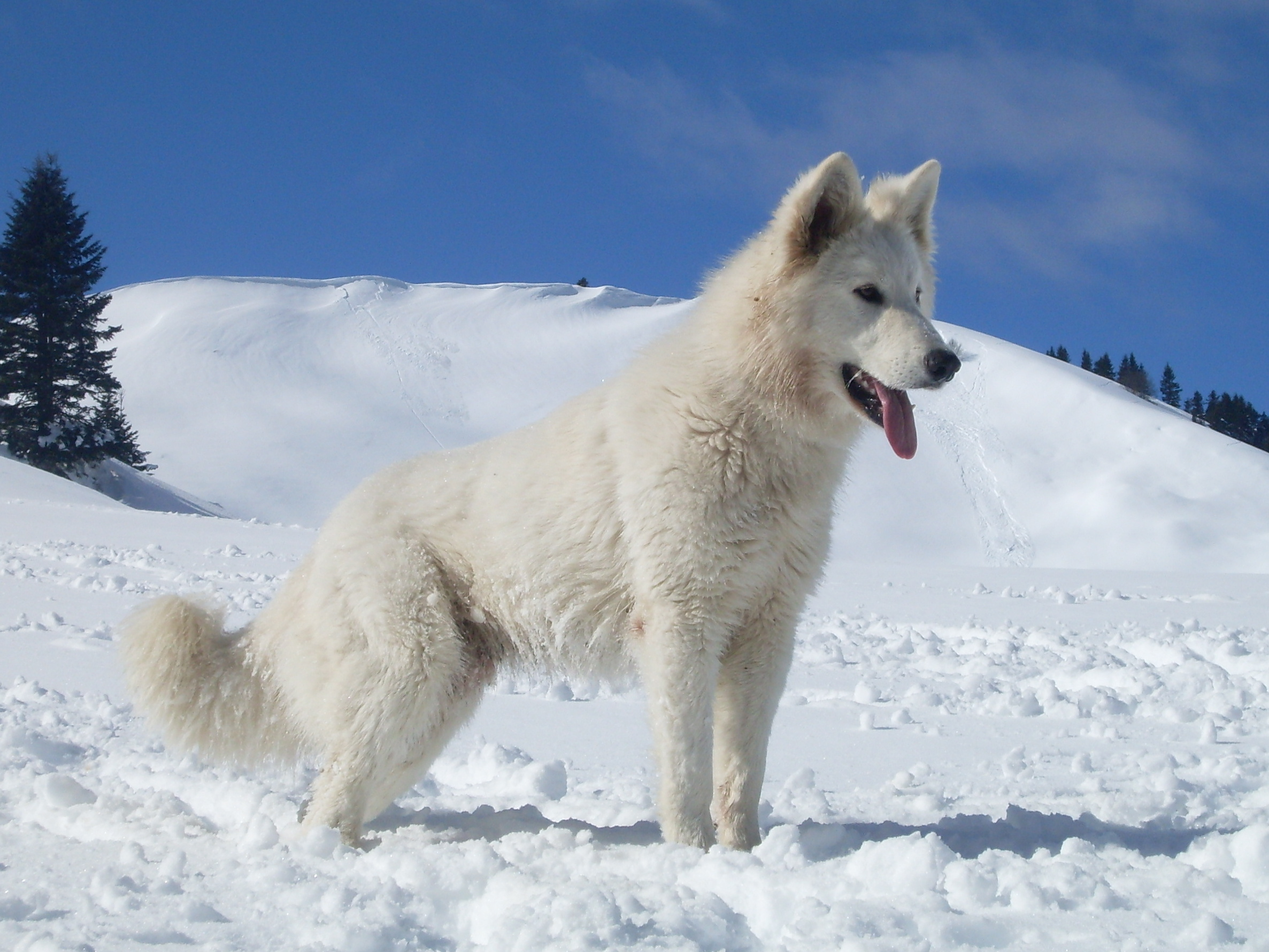
- Other names: Berger Blanc Suisse
- Origin: Switzerland
Traits
Height	Males	60–66 cm (24–26 in)
	Females	55–61 cm (22–24 in)
Weight	Males	30–40 kg (66–88 lb)
	Females	25–35 kg (55–77 lb)
- Coat: thick, either medium-length or long
- Colour: white
Kennel club standards
- Fédération Cynologique Internationale: standard

The White Swiss Shepherd Dog or Berger Blanc Suisse (German: Weisser Schweizer Schäferhund, Italian: Pastore Svizzero Bianco, Romansh: Chaun Paster Svizzer Alv) is a Swiss breed of shepherd dog. It descends from North American White Shepherds imported to Switzerland; the White Shepherd itself descends from white-coloured purebred German Shepherds.

== History ==
White-coated German Shepherds were once barred from registration in their native Germany, but in the United States and Canada the colouration remained popular; a breed club was formed and these white dogs came to be recognised as a distinct breed, the White Shepherd.

The Berger Blanc Suisse derives from dogs of this type imported from North America to Switzerland from the early 1970s. The first of these was an American dog named Lobo, born on 5 March 1966; other dogs were imported from Canada and from the United States.

It was recognised as a breed in Switzerland in June 1991, and registered in the Livre des origines suisse of the Société Cynologique Suisse. It was provisionally recognised by the Fédération Cynologique Internationale in 2002, and was definitively accepted in 2011. It was recognised by the British Kennel Club in 2017.

== Characteristics ==
The White Swiss Shepherd is of medium size, with a weight in the range 25–40 kg and a height at the withers usually between 53 and 66 cm. Two types of coat are seen, medium-length and long; the coat is always white, preferably with dark skin. The eyes range from light to dark brown and are almond-shaped; the ears are erect, forward-pointing, triangular, and slightly rounded at the tips.

Its herding abilities are similar to those of the German Shepherd. Registration is not subject to a working trial.
