= Susie Essman =

American stand-up comedian and actress (born 1955)

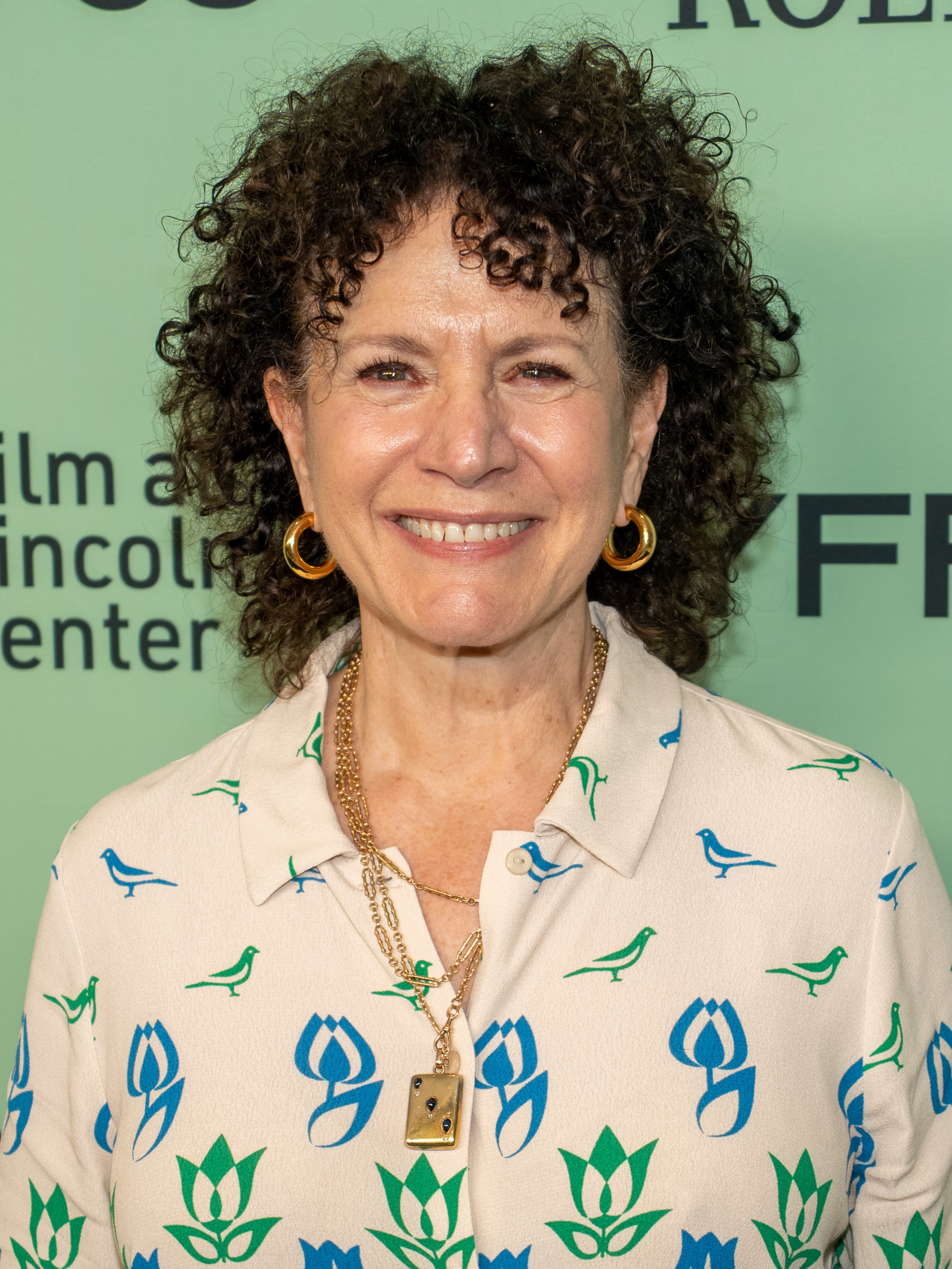
- Essman at the 2025 New York Film Festival
- Born: May 31, 1955 (age 71); New York City, U.S.
- Education: State University of New York, Purchase (BFA)
- Notable work: Curb Your Enthusiasm; Bolt
- Spouse: Jim Harder (m. 2008)

Comedy career
- Years active: 1975–present
- Medium: Film; television; stand-up

Susan Essman (born May 31, 1955) is an American comedian, actress, producer, and writer. She is best known for her role as Susie Greene on Curb Your Enthusiasm (2000–2024), as the voice of Mittens in Bolt (2008), as Bobbi Wexler on Broad City (2015-2019), and as the voice of Esther Lonstein on American Dad.

== Early life ==
Essman was born on May 31, 1955 in the Bronx, New York City, and was raised in the suburb of Mount Vernon. Her father, Leonard Essman, was an internist and clinical oncologist. Her mother, Zora (née Pressman), taught Russian at Sarah Lawrence College. She is the great-granddaughter of silent film actor and Russian opera impresario Leo Feodoroff. Essman is Jewish; her grandparents emigrated from Russia and Poland.

== Career ==
=== Performing ===
Essman has been traveling and appearing at clubs throughout the country for more than three decades. In 1988, she appeared on HBO with Joy Behar and other rising female comedians on On Location: Women of the Night II. On January 5, 1989, she was a guest on The Tonight Show with Johnny Carson. Her first half-hour special premiered on September 20, 1992 on HBO’s One Night Stand. As much of her comedy draws from her ethnic background, she has been featured in such documentaries as Heroes of Jewish Comedy and A History of Jewish Comedy.

Essman made her UK standup comedy debut at the Corn Exchange at the Newbury Comedy Festival in July 2007. While in England, she appeared on the British television show 8 Out of 10 Cats.

Essman began her acting career with small parts in two 1988 films – Crocodile Dundee II and Punchline – but is best known for her role as Susie Greene, the wife of Jeff Greene (portrayed by Jeff Garlin), on the HBO comedy series Curb Your Enthusiasm. Essman told The New York Times that, by the show's third season, she could not "walk down the street anymore without people stopping her and begging her to say [her character's catchphrase] 'You fat fuck'". In 2007, Slate named Essman's character one of the best on television, and a reason the publication looked forward to the return of the show.

She also provided the voice of Helen Higgins on the Comedy Central series Crank Yankers; she was an occasional correspondent on the first season of the network's The Daily Show. She appeared on Comedy Central's Roast of Bob Saget on August 17, 2008, provided the voice of "Mittens" (the cat) in the 2008 Disney animated film, Bolt, and later reprised the role in the 2009 short Super Rhino, released on the film's home media. She also made an appearance on the Regis Philbin version of Million Dollar Password.

In June of 2026, Essman was announced to have a guest appearance in the upcoming season 2 of Adults.

=== Writing ===
Essman's book, What Would Susie Say: Bullshit Wisdom About Love, Life and Comedy, was published in October 2009 by Simon & Schuster.

== Personal life ==
Essman was diagnosed with celiac disease in 2002 and used to be a pescatarian — "not a moral thing", she explains, but "aesthetic"; chicken "grosses me out" — and "lives on sushi". She married Jim Harder, a commercial real estate broker, in September 2008. She owns a Shih Tzu named Popeye. Her sister, musician and composer Nora Essman Morrow, died in 2023.

Essman is a good friend of Joy Behar and has appeared on The View multiple times. In 2009, Behar hosted an event at the 92nd Street Y with Essman as a guest.

== Filmography ==
=== Film ===
Year	Title	Role	Notes
1988	Crocodile Dundee II	Subway Tour Guide	
1991	Teenage Mutant Ninja Turtles II: The Secret of the Ooze	Soho Woman	
1997	Volcano	Anita	
1997	What's Your Sign?	Carla	
2000	Keeping the Faith	Ellen Friedman	
2005	The Man	Lt. Rita Carbone	
2008	Bolt	Mittens (voice)	
2010	Cop Out	Laura	
2012	Putzel	Gilda	
2017	Band Aid	Shirley	
2017	Gilbert	Herself	Documentary
2024	The Easy Kind	Janice	

=== Television ===
Year	Title	Role	Notes
1988–1989	Baby Boom	Charlotte Elkman	13 episodes
1991–1992	True Colors	Mrs. Wampler	2 episodes
1993	Women Aloud	Panelist	Episode: "Waist Management"
1994	Hardcore TV	Sports Lady	2 episodes
1995	Ned and Stacey	Aunt Ceil	Episode: "Thanksgiving Day Massacre"
1997–2004	Law & Order	Performer	2 episodes
1998	Dr. Katz, Professional Therapist	Herself (voice)	Episode: "Waltz"
2000–2024	Curb Your Enthusiasm	Susie Greene	Main role; 86 episodes
2002	The King of Queens	Marcia	Episode: "No Orleans"
2002	Law & Order: Criminal Intent	Ron Sherwood's Secretary	Episode: "Badge"
2002–2003	Crank Yankers	Helen Higgins (voice)	4 episodes
2003	Kim Possible	Sadie (voice)	"Car Trouble"
2006	Dora the Explorer	Queen Bee (voice)	Episode: "Dora's First Trip"
2009	Loving Leah	Malka	Television film
2009–present	American Dad!	Mrs. Lonstein (voice)	Recurring role
2012	Adventure Time	Barb (voice)	Episode: "Web Weirdos"
2013	Blue Bloods	Judge Clarice Karl	Episode: "Front Page News"
2015	Weird Loners	Evelyn Goldfarb	2 episodes
2015–2019	Broad City	Bobbi Wexler	8 episodes
2015–2018	Law & Order: Special Victims Unit	Arlene Heller	4 episodes
2016–2019	Those Who Can't	Leslie Brohn	10 episodes
2017	The Goldbergs	Edie Robb	Episode: "So Swayze It's Crazy"
2018	Beat Bobby Flay	Self (guest)	Episode: "Skirting By"
2019	Bless This Mess	Donna	7 episodes
2020–present	Harley Quinn	Sharon Quinzel, Grandma Quinzel (voice)	2 episodes
2022	Hacks	Elaine Carter	2 episodes
2022	Bob's Burgers	Lorraine (voice)	Episode: "Sauce Side Story"
2024	Lego Marvel Avengers: Mission Demolition	Gloria (voice)	Disney+ special
2024	The Simpsons	Aunt Sadie Krustofsky (voice)	Episode: "Homer and Her Sisters"
2025	Celebrity Jeopardy!	Herself (Contestant)	
2025	And Just Like That...	Rhonda	Episode: "Better Than Sex"
2026	Life, Larry and the Pursuit of Unhappiness	Susan B. Anthony	Episode: "Buzz"
2026	Adults	Arlene Walters	Episode: “The Scrub”

== Awards and nominations ==
Year	Award	Category	Project	Result	Ref.
2006	Screen Actors Guild Award	Outstanding Ensemble in a Comedy Series	Curb Your Enthusiasm	Nominated	
2010	Screen Actors Guild Award	Outstanding Ensemble in a Comedy Series	Curb Your Enthusiasm	Nominated	
2015	Critics' Choice Television Award	Best Guest Performer in a Comedy Series	Broad City	Nominated	
2018	Screen Actors Guild Award	Outstanding Ensemble in a Comedy Series	Curb Your Enthusiasm	Nominated	
