= The Sea Beast (2022 film) =

Netflix Animation film

- Promotional release poster
- Directed by: Chris Williams
- Screenplay by: Chris Williams; Nell Benjamin
- Story by: Chris Williams
- Produced by: Jed Schlanger; Chris Williams
- Starring: Karl Urban; Zaris-Angel Hator; Jared Harris; Marianne Jean-Baptiste
- Edited by: Joyce Arrastia
- Music by: Mark Mancina
- Production company: Netflix Animation Studios
- Distributed by: Netflix
- Release dates: June 24, 2022 (United States); July 8, 2022 (Netflix)
- Running time: 115 minutes
- Country: United States
- Language: English

The Sea Beast is a 2022 American animated fantasy adventure film directed by Chris Williams, who co-wrote the screenplay with Nell Benjamin and produced with Jed Schlanger. The film stars the voices of Karl Urban, Zaris-Angel Hator, Jared Harris, and Marianne Jean-Baptiste with supporting roles by Kathy Burke, Jim Carter, Doon Mackichan, and Dan Stevens. It tells the story of a sea-monster hunter and a young orphan girl who joins his crew on their search for an elusive beast known as the Red Bluster.

The film began a limited theatrical release on June 24, 2022, before debuting on Netflix on July 8. It received critical acclaim and became one of the most-successful Netflix original animated films, with 165 million hours viewed over its first five months of release. The film earned several nominations, including Best Animated Feature at the 95th Academy Awards, but lost to Guillermo del Toro's Pinocchio, another Netflix animated film.

A sequel is in development, with Williams returning as director.

== Plot ==
For centuries, sea beasts have surfaced to wreak havoc against humankind. In response, crews of "hunters" venture outward on their ships to hunt the beasts. The most famous and successful being the crew of the Inevitable, led by the legendary Captain Crow, his first mate Sarah Sharpe, and his adopted son and boatswain Jacob Holland. The hunters are supported by the King and Queen of the Crown by means of the Three Bridges Society as a result of the hunters' success over the centuries. After nearly being killed during a hunt, Crow tells Jacob he will make him captain once they kill the "Red Bluster", who took his right eye years earlier.

The crew returns to Three Bridges to collect payment for their latest catch, but the King and Queen inform them that they will soon be replaced by the modern naval vessel Imperator, headed by Admiral Eric Hornagold, due to the Crown considering the hunters obsolete and not agreeing with the hunters' code of conduct, especially when Crow's crew was forced to abandon their hunt of the Red Bluster in order to save another hunter ship. This angers Crow and Sarah and nearly results in their arrest before Jacob placates them with a proposal that his crew be given one more chance to kill the Red Bluster as a test of worth. Admiral Hornagold accepts, and the Crown declares a contest between the crews of the Imperator and Inevitable with the winner being allowed to hunt the sea beasts in their name.

After they depart, the crew discovers an orphan girl named Maisie Brumble has stowed away on the ship to join them, having been inspired to do so by her late parents, who were themselves hunters. The Inevitable relocates and attacks the Red Bluster, however, the ship is in danger of being pulled under, and, against Crow's orders, Jacob hesitantly allows Maisie to cut the Bluster free, which saves the crew, but lets the monster escape and throws Jacob and Maisie into the sea. Angered, Crow holds both of them at gunpoint and demands Jacob bring Maisie to him before the Bluster emerges from the depths and swallows Maisie and Jacob whole.

Jacob and Maisie are taken to an isolated island populated by several other sea beasts. Maisie discovers that the Bluster is not malicious and befriends the beast, renaming her Red, while also befriending a smaller beast named Blue. Maisie begins to believe the monsters are really just misunderstood creatures, which Jacob initially denies. Jacob and Maisie convince Red to take them to Rum Pepper Island, so they can secure a ship to return to Three Bridges.

Believing Jacob to be dead, a grieving Crow seeks out the renowned hunter and merchant Gwen Batterbie who gives Crow a poison-tipped harpoon powerful enough to kill Red. While travelling on Red's back, Jacob and Maisie bond with the creature and each other, with Jacob growing to support Maisie's belief that the beasts are innocent. They reach Rum Pepper Island, but discover the Imperator and Hornagold are stationed there. Red attacks the vessel after being shot at and inadvertently wounds Maisie in the scuffle.

After she destroys the Imperator, Jacob stops Red's rampage and prevents her from killing Hornagold. Red re-engages after she spots the Inevitable and nearly dies after being struck with the poison-tipped harpoon, with Crow keeping her alive long enough to bring her to the Crown as a trophy. Maisie is nursed back to health, but then imprisoned aboard the Inevitable as it arrives at Three Bridges with Red in tow. After Blue frees Maisie, she discovers the dangers of the sea beasts to be propaganda created by the Crown to extend their corrupt rule.

Crow prepares to publicly execute Red before being stopped by Jacob. Crow and Jacob fight, while Maisie and Sarah, who begins to believe Maisie's worldview of the beasts, free Red from her binds. Maisie and Jacob convince Red to spare Crow, subsequently exposing the Crown for their deceptions. After witnessing the passive nature of the beasts, Crow and the people of the kingdom renounce their beliefs. With Red and the other sea beasts left alone, Maisie, Jacob, and Blue begin their new lives together as a family.

== Voice cast ==
- Karl Urban as Jacob Holland
- Zaris-Angel Hator as Maisie Brumble
- Jared Harris as Captain Augustus Crow III
- Marianne Jean-Baptiste as Sarah Sharpe
- Kathy Burke as Gwen Batterbie
- Jim Carter as the King of The Crown
- Doon Mackichan as the Queen of The Crown
- Dan Stevens as Admiral Eric Hornagold
- Benjamin Plessala as Child 1
- Somali Rose as Child 2
- Kaya McLean as Child 3
- Davis Pak as Child 4, Villager Boy
- Helen Sadler as Matron, Mrs. Merino, Cart Driver
- Xana Tang as Lea the Lookout
- Alex Wyndham as Sailor #1 and 2, Villager
- Brian T. Delaney as Captain Jim Nicklebones
- Ian Mercer as Old Nick
- Shannon Chan-Kent as Fen
- Max Mittelman as Young Sailor
- Paul Chowdhry as Surgeon
- Rajia Baroudi as General
- Emily O'Brien as Villager 1, Villager 2
- David Lee as Sergeant
- Jason Anthony as Sailor
- Mark Rhino Smith as Various (uncredited)

== Production ==
On November 5, 2018, Netflix announced that Chris Williams would write and direct a brand new animated film Jacob and the Sea Beast, based on his own original story. On November 7, 2020, the film was retitled to The Sea Beast.

=== Animation and design ===
Animation services were provided by Sony Pictures Imageworks in Vancouver who have provided new technology build upon the film. For the look and feel of the film, they were drawn close to the artwork of N. C. Wyeth for the wide open oceans and Caspar David Friedrich for low contrast on the cinematic looks of the film. To match the wrinkles around Captain Crow, the inkline tool used for Spider-Man: Into the Spider-Verse was reworked into crease-lines to give custom wrinkles to curve depth in a more sculptural way around Crow's face. For the camera shots on the ship, a new camera tool was developed to counterbalance the camera to scenes set on the ship or the boat for a more live-action approach from the classic sea-monster films along with a new pivoting tool called Sea Legs, which was engineered for characters balancing on moving surfaces. Another new tool that was used for the webs in Spider-Man: Across the Spider-Verse was a new animation rig used on the ropes from the ship with more flexibility and control over how much rope was used in the film.

=== Music ===
Mark Mancina composed the film's score, having previously worked with Williams on Moana (2016). Mancina also produced an original song called "Captain Crow", a sea shanty depicting the character written by Nell Benjamin and Laurence O'Keefe.

== Release ==
In March 2022, Netflix announced its premiere date for July 8, 2022. The film was released in select theaters on June 24, 2022, before its Netflix debut.

== Reception ==
=== Critical response ===
On the review aggregator website Rotten Tomatoes, 94% of 108 critics' reviews are positive, with an average rating of 7.6/10. The website's consensus reads: "An original animated tale that's often as daring as its characters, The Sea Beast sends audiences on a voyage well worth taking." Metacritic, which uses a weighted average, assigned the film a score of 74 out of 100, based on 20 critics, indicating "generally favorable" reviews.

=== Accolades ===
Award	Date of ceremony	Category	Recipient(s)	Result	Ref.
Academy Awards	March 10, 2023	Best Animated Feature	Chris Williams, Jed Schlanger	Nominated	
Alliance of Women Film Journalists	January 5, 2023	Best Animated Film	Chris Williams	Nominated	
Annie Awards	February 25, 2023	Best Animated Feature	Netflix Animation	Nominated	
Annie Awards	February 25, 2023	Outstanding Achievement for Animated Effects in an Animated Production	Spencer Lueders, Dmitriy Kolesnik, Kiel Gnebba, Oleksandr (Alex) Loboda, Jeremy Hoey	Nominated	
Annie Awards	February 25, 2023	Outstanding Achievement for Editorial in an Animated Feature Production	Joyce Arrastia, ACE, Will Erokan, Vivek Sharma, Michael Hugh O'Donnell, Daniel Ortiz	Nominated	
Annie Awards	February 25, 2023	Outstanding Achievement for Music in a Feature Production	Mark Mancina, Nell Benjamin, Laurence O'Keefe	Nominated	
Annie Awards	February 25, 2023	Outstanding Achievement for Production Design in an Animated Feature Production	Matthias Lechner, Jung Woonyoung	Nominated	
Annie Awards	February 25, 2023	Outstanding Achievement for Voice Acting in a Feature Production	Zaris-Angel Hator (cast)	Nominated	
Visual Effects Society Awards	February 15, 2023	Visual Effects Society Award for Outstanding Created Environment in an Animated Feature	Yohan Bang, Enoch Ihde, Denil George Chundangal, John Wallace_{(The Hunting Ship)}	Nominated	
Visual Effects Society Awards	February 15, 2023	Visual Effects Society Award for Outstanding Effects Simulations in an Animated Feature	Spencer Lueders, Dmitriy Kolesnik, Brian D. Casper, Joe Eckroat	Nominated	
Visual Effects Society Awards	February 15, 2023	Visual Effects Society Award for Outstanding Model in a Photoreal or Animated Project	Maxx Okazaki, Susan Kornfeld, Edward Lee, Doug Smith	Nominated	
Visual Effects Society Awards	February 15, 2023	Visual Effects Society Award for Outstanding Visual Effects in an Animated Feature	Joshua Beveridge, Christian Hejnal, Stirling Duguid, Spencer Lueders	Nominated	

== Sequel ==
In a January 2023 interview with The Hollywood Reporter, Williams announced he had signed a deal with Netflix and would be working on a sequel to The Sea Beast following the film's massive success.
