= 14th Critics' Choice Awards =

2009 US film awards

- Date: January 8, 2009
- Official website: www.criticschoice.com

Highlights
- Best Film: Slumdog Millionaire

The 14th Critics' Choice Awards were presented on January 8, 2009, at the Santa Monica Civic Auditorium, honoring the finest achievements of 2008 filmmaking. The nominees were announced on December 9, 2008.

== Winners and nominees ==
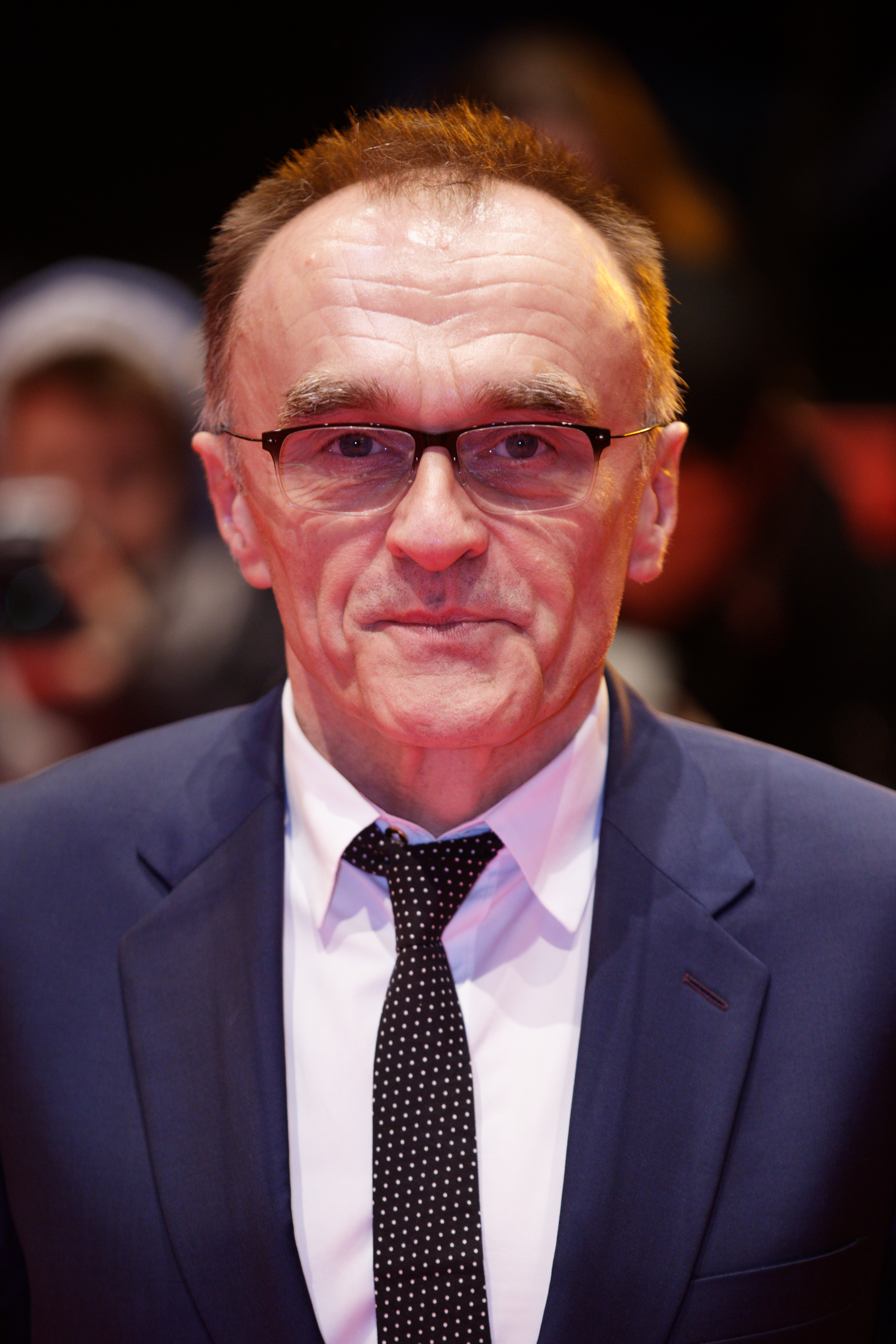
Danny Boyle, Best Director winner

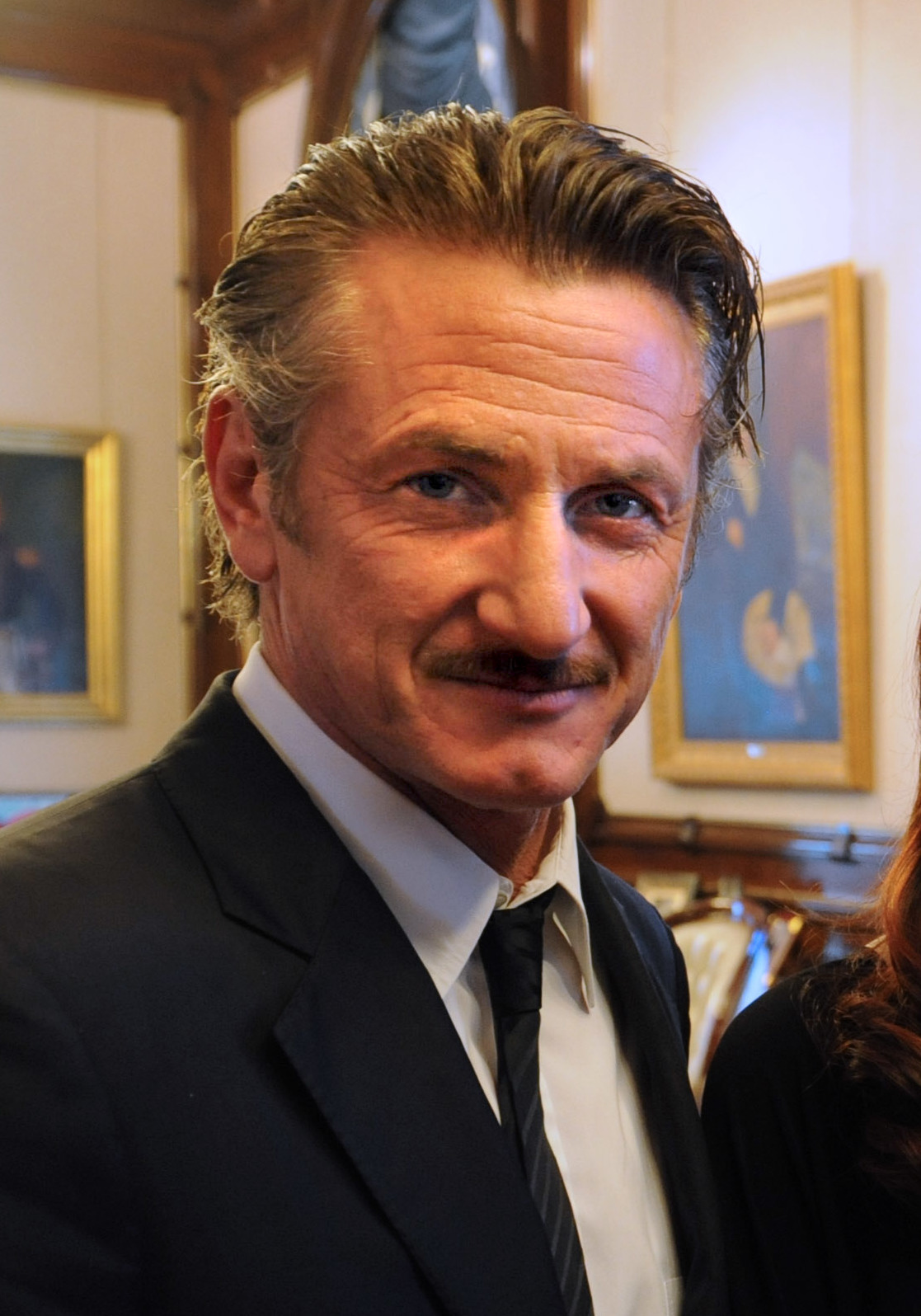
Sean Penn, Best Actor winner

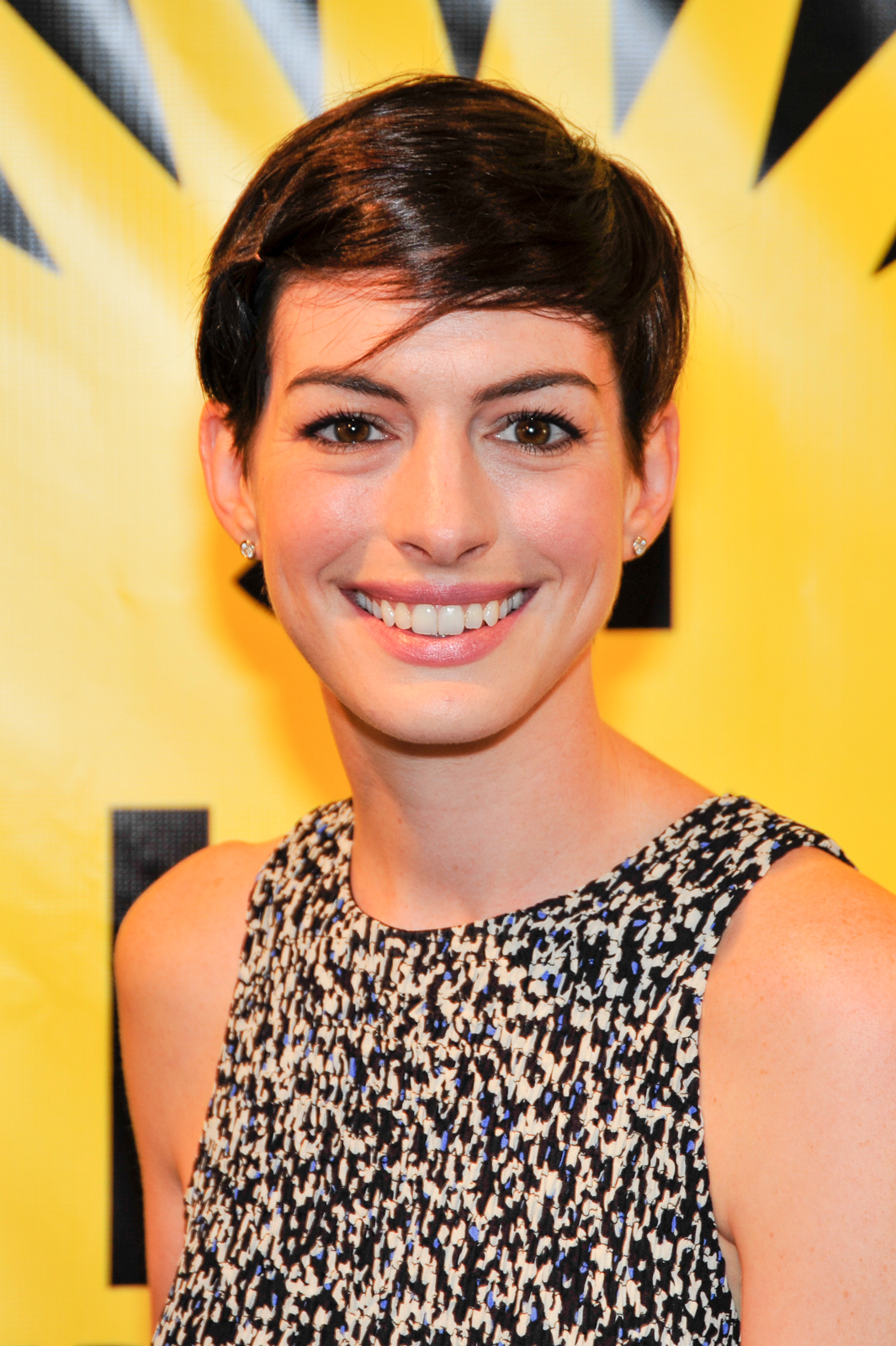
Anne Hathaway, Best Actress co-winner

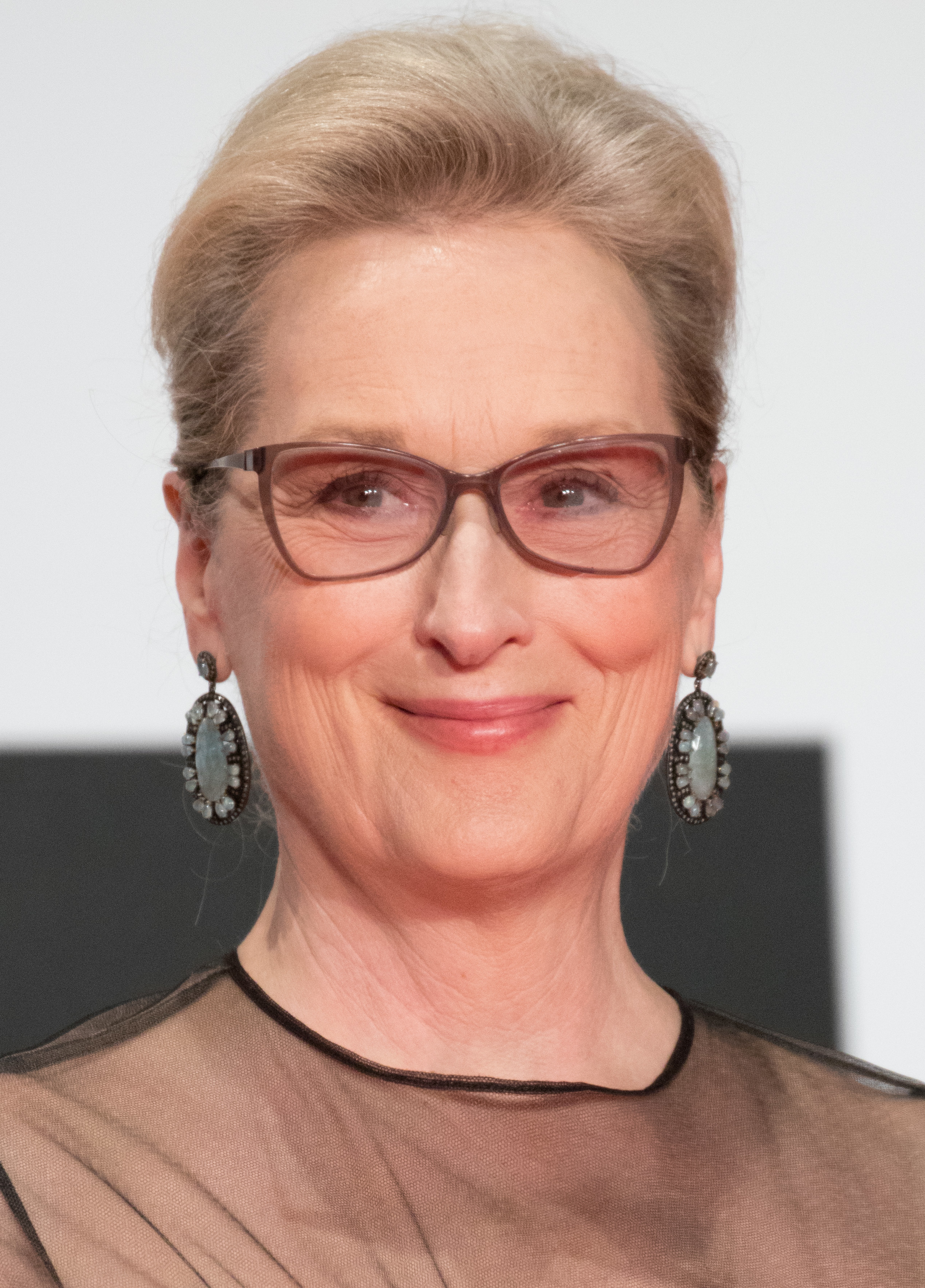
Meryl Streep, Best Actress co-winner

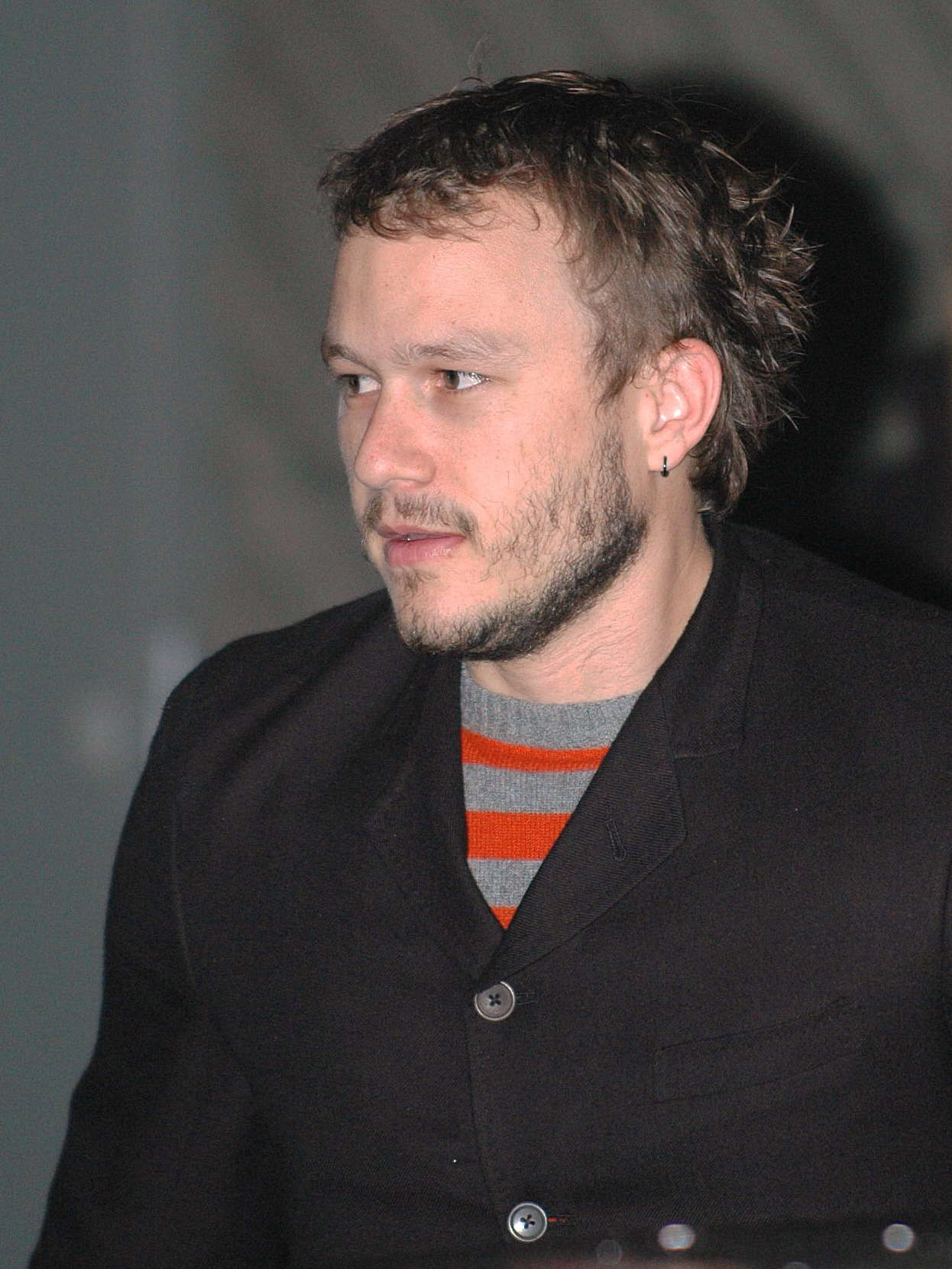
Heath Ledger, Best Supporting Actor winner

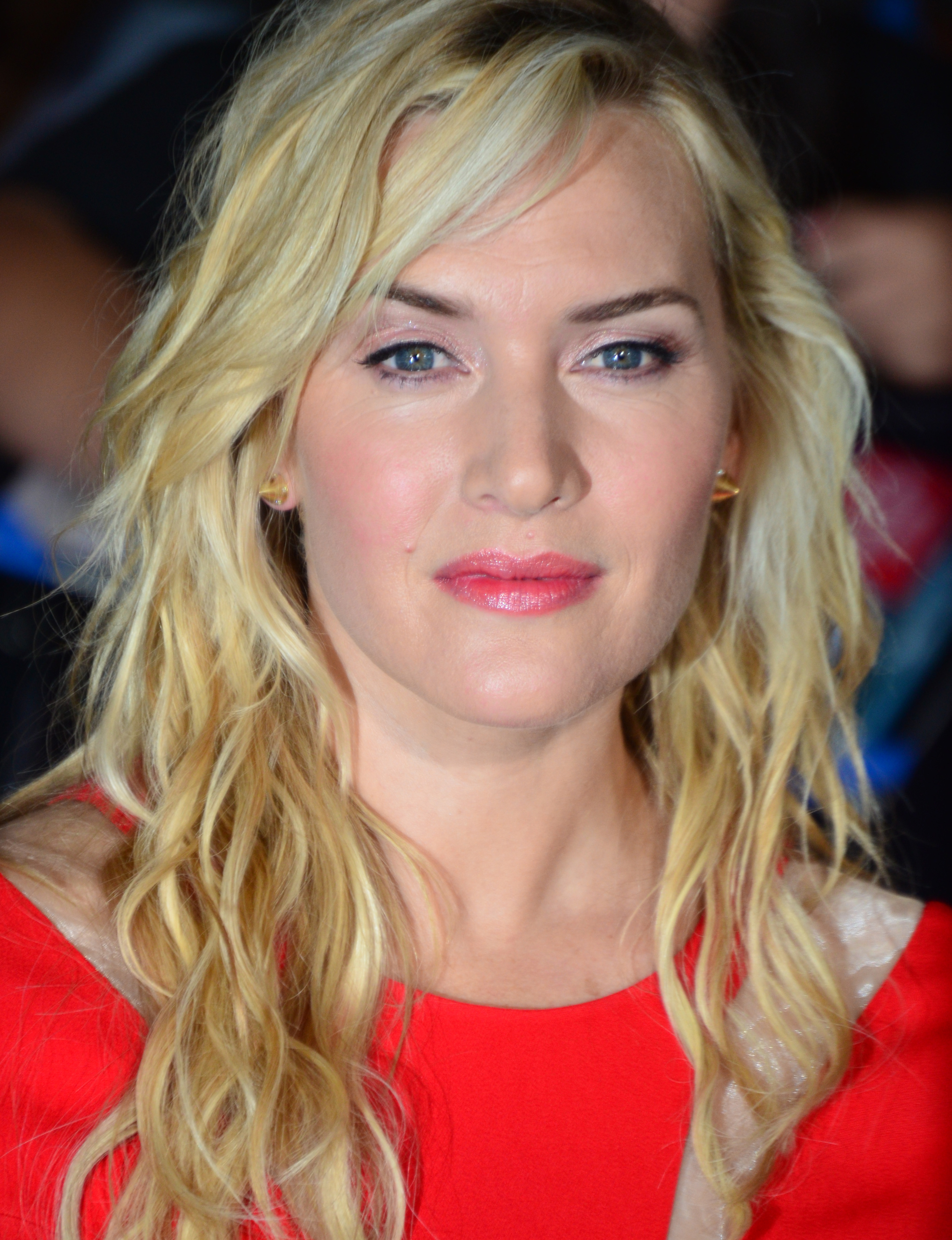
Kate Winslet, Best Supporting Actress winner

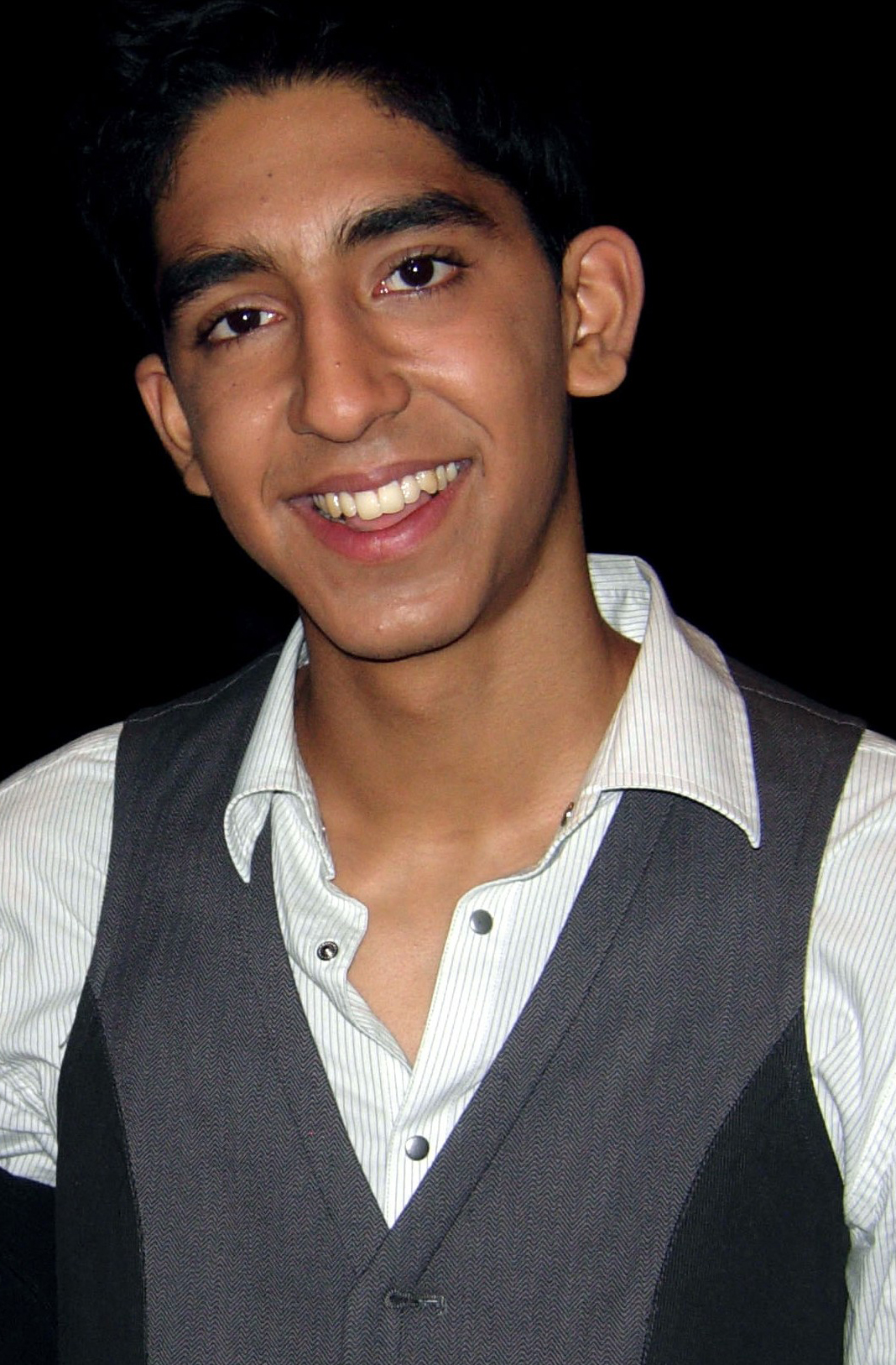
Dev Patel, Best Young Performer winner

Best Picture Slumdog Millionaire: Changeling; The Curious Case of Benjamin Button; The Dark Knight; Doubt; Frost/Nixon; Milk; The Reader; WALL-E; The Wrestler	Best Director Danny Boyle – Slumdog Millionaire: Christopher Nolan – The Dark Knight; David Fincher – The Curious Case of Benjamin Button; Gus Van Sant – Milk; Ron Howard – Frost/Nixon
Best Actor Sean Penn – Milk as Harvey Milk: Brad Pitt – The Curious Case of Benjamin Button as Benjamin Button; Clint Eastwood – Gran Torino as Walt Kowalski; Frank Langella – Frost/Nixon as Richard Nixon; Mickey Rourke – The Wrestler as Robin Ramzinski/Randy Robinson; Richard Jenkins – The Visitor as Walter Vale	Best Actress Anne Hathaway – Rachel Getting Married as Kym Buchman (Tie); Meryl Streep – Doubt as Aloysius Beauvier (Tie): Angelina Jolie – Changeling as Christine Collins; Cate Blanchett – The Curious Case of Benjamin Button as Daisy Fuller; Kate Beckinsale – Nothing but the Truth as Rachel Armstrong; Melissa Leo – Frozen River as Ray Eddy
Best Supporting Actor Heath Ledger – The Dark Knight as Joker: James Franco – Milk as Scott Smith; Josh Brolin – Milk as Dan White; Philip Seymour Hoffman – Doubt as Brendan Flynn; Robert Downey Jr. – Tropic Thunder as Kirk Lazarus	Best Supporting Actress Kate Winslet – The Reader as Hanna Schmitz: Marisa Tomei – The Wrestler as Pam/Cassidy; Penelope Cruz – Vicky Cristina Barcelona as Maria Elena; Taraji P. Henson – The Curious Case of Benjamin Button as Queenie; Vera Farmiga – Nothing but the Truth as Erica Van Doren; Viola Davis – Doubt as Miller
Best Young Performer Dev Patel – Slumdog Millionaire as Jamal Malik: Brandon Walters – Australia as Nullah; Dakota Fanning – The Secret Life of Bees as Lily Owens; David Kross – The Reader as Michael Berg	Best Cast Milk: The Curious Case of Benjamin Button; The Dark Knight; Doubt; Rachel Getting Married
Best Writer Slumdog Millionaire – Simon Beaufoy: The Curious Case of Benjamin Button – Eric Roth; Doubt – John Patrick Shanley; Frost/Nixon – Peter Morgan; Milk – Dustin Lance Black	Best Foreign Language Film Waltz with Bashir • Israel: A Christmas Tale • France; Gomorrah • Italy; I've Loved You So Long • France; Let the Right One In • Sweden; Mongol • Kazakhstan
Best Animated Feature WALL-E: Bolt; Kung Fu Panda; Madagascar: Escape 2 Africa; Waltz with Bashir; Space Chimps	Best Documentary Feature Man on Wire (Tie); Stealing America: Vote by Vote (Tie): I.O.U.S.A.; Roman Polanski: Wanted and Desired; Standard Operating Procedure; Young@Heart
Best Action Movie The Dark Knight: Indiana Jones and the Kingdom of the Crystal Skull; Iron Man; Quantum of Solace; Wanted; The Incredible Hulk	Best Comedy Movie Tropic Thunder: Burn After Reading; Forgetting Sarah Marshall; Role Models; Vicky Cristina Barcelona
Best Composer Slumdog Millionaire – A. R. Rahman: Changeling – Clint Eastwood; The Curious Case of Benjamin Button – Alexandre Desplat; The Dark Knight – Hans Zimmer and James Newton Howard; Milk – Danny Elfman	Best Song "The Wrestler" – The Wrestler: "Another Way to Die" – Quantum of Solace; "Down to Earth" – WALL-E; "I Thought I Lost You" – Bolt; "Jai Ho" – Slumdog Millionaire

=== Best Picture Made for Television ===
John Adams

- Coco Chanel
- Recount

=== Joel Siegel Award ===
Richard Gere

== Statistics ==
Nominations	Film
8	The Curious Case of Benjamin Button
8	Milk
6	The Dark Knight
6	Doubt
6	Slumdog Millionaire
4	Frost/Nixon
4	The Wrestler
3	Changeling
3	The Reader
3	WALL-E
2	Bolt
2	Nothing but the Truth
2	Quantum of Solace
2	Rachel Getting Married
2	Tropic Thunder
2	Vicky Cristina Barcelona
2	Waltz with Bashir

Wins	Film
5	Slumdog Millionaire
2	The Dark Knight
2	Milk
