= I Thought I Lost You =

Promotional single by Miley Cyrus and John Travolta

from the album Bolt
- Released: 2008
- Recorded: 2008
- Studio: Annetenna Studios (Burbank, CA); South Beach Studios (Miami, FL)
- Genre: Pop rock; country
- Length: 3:35
- Label: Walt Disney
- Songwriters: Miley Cyrus; Jeffrey Steele
- Producer: Steele

Licensed audio
- "I Thought I Lost You (Soundtrack)" on YouTube

"I Thought I Lost You" is a song performed by American singers and actors Miley Cyrus and John Travolta. It was released as a promotional single in 2008. The song was written by Cyrus alongside producer Jeffrey Steele. It was included in the 2008 Disney animated film Bolt, in which Cyrus and Travolta provide the voices of main characters Penny and Bolt. "I Thought I Lost You" was made after filmmakers requested Cyrus to write a song for the film. The song reflects the film's story of a dog being separated from his owner and trying to find his way back to her.

"I Thought I Lost You" was nominated for Broadcast Film Critics Association Award for Best Song and Golden Globe Award for Best Original Song, losing both to Bruce Springsteen's "The Wrestler" from The Wrestler (2008). The song's accompanying promotional clip has Cyrus and Travolta performing the song in a recording studio and features clips from Bolt. "I Thought I Lost You" was promoted by live performances by Cyrus.

== Background ==
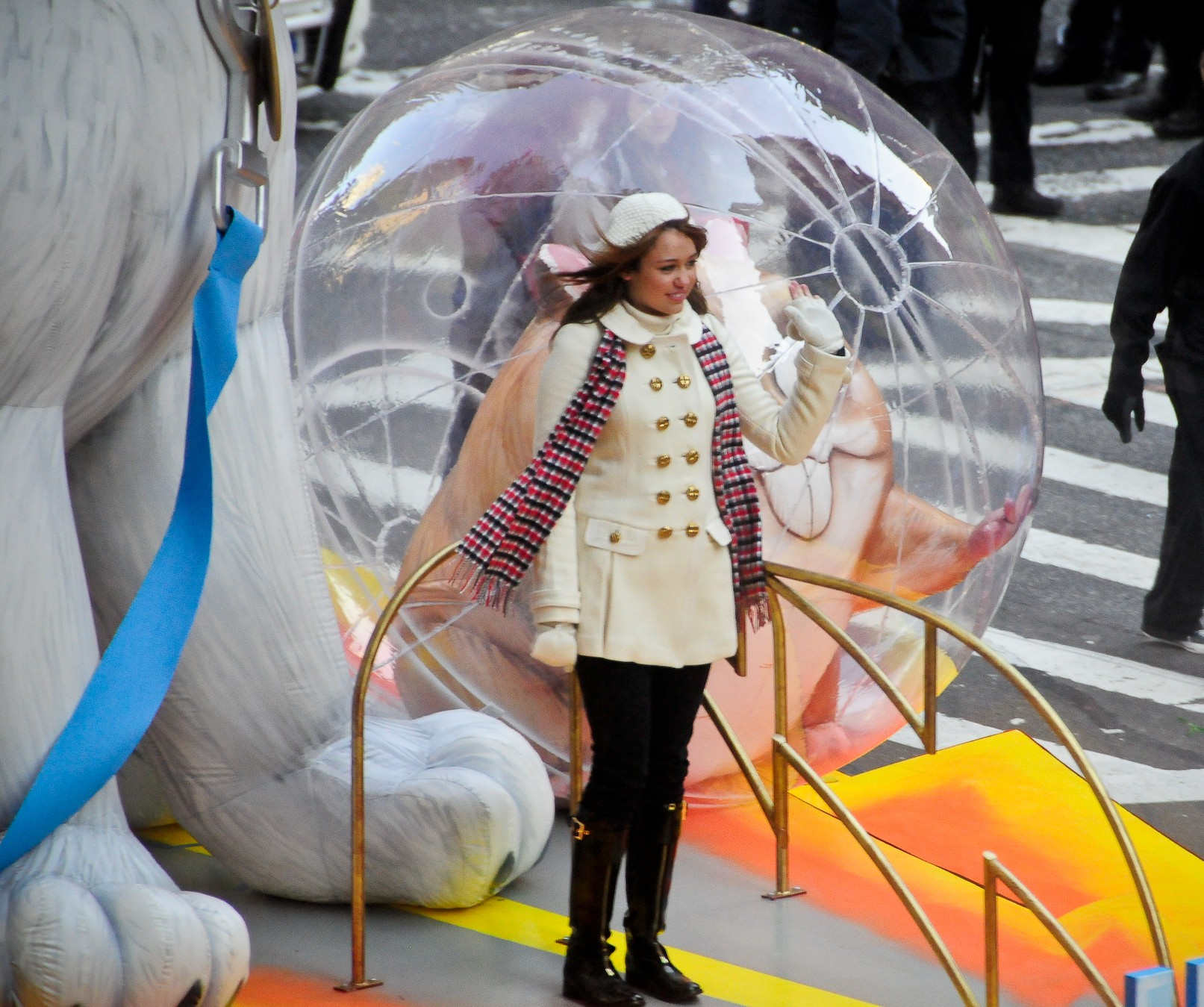
Cyrus performed "I Thought I Lost You" at the 2008 Macy's Thanksgiving Day Parade.

Cyrus became involved with Bolt once she was cast as Penny, Bolt's owner. Filmmakers asked Cyrus to write a song for herself and John Travolta, who stars as Bolt. She co-wrote the song with the aid of Jeffrey Steele, who also produced the track, in a short period of time as they had a due date. The film's settings vary in cities throughout the United States, which Cyrus thought she could capture in the song. "Not just make it something that sounds from Hollywood and really produced, but we could add a little country twang to it," she said. Cyrus said the writing process was easy. Before the song's completion, Travolta agreed to sing it, believing "Well, it will be a cute song, whatever it is." After listening to the song, he was surprised at Cyrus' songwriting abilities. "She's really gifted at writing, and she really wanted to write something good for me as the character Bolt, so she went out of her way with her writing partner to come up with something good, and I really think they pulled it off", Travolta told MTV News.

John Lasseter, executive producer of Bolt, decided to make "I Thought I Lost You" the theme for Bolt, since it lyrically summarized the film's plot. He said, "[The song] sums up the theme of this film. You know, a dog and its owner and they both were separated, but they love each other so much — there's such an emotional payoff when these characters get reunited, and I think that's what this song's about." Lasseter thought that solely the song worked, but it worked better for the film. "I Thought I Lost You" is one of two songs on the Bolt soundtrack and was released to Radio Disney to promote Bolt and its accompanying soundtrack.

== Composition ==
"I Thought I Lost You" (2008)
A 26 second sample of Miley Cyrus and John Travolta's "I Thought I Lost You".

"I Thought I Lost You" is a pop rock and country song and lasts three minutes and thirty-six seconds. Its instrumentation includes electric guitar and piano. The song is set in common time at a moderate rock tempo of 103 beats per minute. The song is sung in the key of E♭ major and Cyrus' vocals span two octaves, from G_{3} to A♭_{5}. "I Thought I Lost You" follows the chord progression of E♭—A♭sus2. The song's lyrics speak of "getting lost and getting found, with an overarching theme of loyalty."

== Critical reception ==
The song received mixed reception from contemporary critics. William Ruhlmann of AllMusic wrote, "The album begins with a pop/rock song, 'I Thought I Lost You,' which oddly sounds like a love duet between John Travolta, a man in his mid-fifties, and the teenage TV and pop star Miley Cyrus, until it is remembered that Travolta voices the movie's title character, a dog." "I Thought I Lost You" was nominated for the Broadcast Film Critics Association Award for Best Song at the 14th Broadcast Film Critics Association Award, but lost to Bruce Springsteen's "The Wrestler" from The Wrestler (2008). The song was nominated for the Golden Globe Award for Best Original Song at the 66th Golden Globe Awards, but also lost to "The Wrestler". An uncredited reviewer from the Los Angeles Times thought the song could have been nominated for and won the Academy Award for Best Original Song at 81st Academy Awards. However, the reviewer stated that the probability of the event was shattered by "a serious obstacle [solely being used in Bolt's ending credits] and lots of Disney competition."

== Live performances ==
Cyrus and Travolta performing in a recording studio in the "I Thought I Lost You" promotional clip.

A promotional clip premiered on November 3, 2008, on Disney Channel. The video commences with a clip from Bolt in which one of the film's characters, Rhino, shouts "Let it begin!" Then several clips from the film play rapidly until Cyrus and Travolta are shown performing in a recording studio. Throughout the rest of the video, scenes alternate between Cyrus and Travolta performing to clips from Bolt. It ends with Rhino performing a brief dance move.

Cyrus first performed "I Thought I Lost You" live on November 12, 2008, at an outdoor concert televised by Good Morning America. She also performed the track at the 2008 Macy's Thanksgiving Day Parade.
