= Bolt (video game) =

2008 video game

- Developers: Avalanche Software; Altron (Nintendo DS)
- Publisher: Disney Interactive Studios
- Engine: Unreal Engine 3
- Platforms: Microsoft Windows; Wii; Xbox 360; PlayStation 2 PlayStation 3 Nintendo DS
- Release: NA: November 18, 2008; AU: December 4, 2008; AU: December 18, 2008 (DS, Wii); EU: February 13, 2009; Windows: NA: December 4, 2008; PAL: January 15, 2009
- Genre: Action game
- Mode: Single-player

Bolt is a 2008 action game published by Disney Interactive Studios. It was developed by Avalanche Software for PlayStation 3, Xbox 360, Wii, PlayStation 2, and Microsoft Windows, and Altron for Nintendo DS. It is based on the 2008 CGI-animated film of the same name. An original Xbox version, that was not released, was reviewed by the German rating system USK, which means it was playable from start to finish.

== Synopsis ==
=== Setting ===
In the game, the player follows and controls the super dog Bolt and Penny on various missions taking place in the fictional TV show universe from the movie. The levels are shared between Bolt and Penny. By using Bolt's superpowers, the player can fight hordes of enemies. New powers, such as Superbark and Laser Eyes, will be unlocked during the game. While Bolt has superpowers, Penny has only her maneuverability by using her Wheelbar and is incentivized to take down enemies in a stealthy way. The game focuses on Bolt's fake TV life, not the actual movie storyline. Penny's father has been abducted by the evil Dr. Calico, and Penny and Bolt must travel through 5 countries to save him.

All of this is actually on TV, and Rhino is watching a DVD pack of all the 25 Bolt episodes, possibly at the rural home at the end of the movie with Bolt's family (Penny, Mittens, Bolt himself, and Penny's mother). On the Nintendo DS version, players can play a mini-game called Rhino's Mission, where they go through mazes and avoid obstacles, like cannons.

Despite the end of the Bolt film showing a new storyline, it can be implied that these episodes featured in the game are mostly the episodes in the first season, despite the movie starting with the pursuit sequence.

=== Plot ===
Penny's father has been abducted by Calico and his organization in an attempt to construct a powerful weapon of untold power. Penny and Bolt travel to Italy in an effort to find out more, but they get nowhere other than learning of Calico's location in Belize.

Calico finally manages to capture Penny once she and Bolt find his temple base in the Yucatán jungle. To prove to Penny's father that she is alive and being held hostage, Calico gives Penny a cell phone with her father on the other line. Calico then attempts to flee the crumbling temple with his new captive but decides to leave her there with Bolt to die, saying, "As long as the professor believes she's alive, he will do what is asked and finish the weapon. Too bad we can't all have nine lives".

However, Penny and Bolt survive and discover Calico's new base in the Russian Arctic with a large rocket in the center. But upon entering, Penny notices micro-focusing mirrors and realizes that it is her father's satellite instead of a warhead. All too late as Calico seals the entrance and, to Bolt's horror, launches it with Penny inside, calling for help. Bolt then jumps onto the rocket and dismantles it in mid-flight, crashing it into the snow.

The two then venture to Calico's harbor in China (discovered by Penny by hacking into a computer system), where they discover a ship full of warheads. Just then, Calico arrives at the harbor, outraged to find Penny still alive, and even more so as he watches his prized freight ship sink to the bottom, thanks to Bolt, who then pursues Calico, escaping in his car to a nearby train station. He arrives at the station and boards his train, closely followed by Penny and her dog. Just as the duo finally corners the doctor, he slips into a hidden room and escapes on his private jet, though not before Penny secures a homing beacon onto the hull, leading them right to Calico's base.

Penny and Bolt trace his jet back to his main base, where Penny's father is being held. Upon arriving, Calico tests his new weapon on Bolt, draining him of his powers and strength and capturing Penny, due to her emotions getting in the way of the mission. Once Penny is inside, he explains his plan to use Penny's father's micro focusing mirror-equipped satellites to bounce a beam around the Earth and neutralize all atomic weaponry except for his own, meaning he can nuke anyone, when he wants, how he wants. As he leaves, he violently kicks Bolt's cage proving Penny of her limited knowledge. During this, Penny maneuvers her way out of her hand bindings.

Once free, she attempts to find her father to save Bolt, but is only captured by Calico once again, just as Bolt regains his powers and Penny sabotages the control panel, raising the bridge so Bolt could reach her. Once he does, Penny escapes from her guard captors yet again and launched a pre-prepared, rocket-powered cart at the main power generator (which Bolt exposed). Then, using what power remains in the generator, Calico duels with Bolt, using powerful lightning bursts. After the lengthy and hard-fought battle, Bolt finally defeats him. Beaten, defeated, and weakened, he attempts to escape on his private helicopter, launching numerous missiles as a decoy, just as Penny finally finds her father (aboard the helicopter). While Bolt tries to apprehend Calico by grabbing his foot, Penny's father pleads to her and Bolt to allow Calico to escape with himself to stop the missiles, reminding her that she had the power to find him again. Regretfully, Penny orders Bolt to stop the missiles as Calico escaped with her father. Bolt successfully destroys the missiles, foiling Calico's plot.

The game closes with an epilogue informing the player of Penny's continuing battle. Then, depending on the version, you either get a "tune in next week" style message or cut to Rhino's dialogue.

== Gameplay ==
Disney has released multiple versions for different game systems, including Nintendo Wii, PC, Xbox 360, and PlayStation 3 and 2. The main console versions play similarly to each other, where for the majority of the game the player will control Bolt, using various attacks and superpowers to beat up Calico's henchmen, while Penny solves simple puzzles and goes through levels with simplistic stealth gameplay. These versions also have hacking mini-games that are constant throughout the game, where the player shoots at various shapes in a twin-stick Shoot 'em up gameplay. The Nintendo DS version is separate, with reduced graphics quality and slightly different gameplay mechanics. Additionally, the DS version is not voiced, but instead uses captions on the screen to tell the user what the characters are saying.

A mobile game was also released. The game was developed by Enorbus and Disney Mobile. The mobile version is a 2D platformer, with 4 levels in three different locations, making for a total of 12 levels. The three locations are (in order): L.A., Bolivia, and Dr. Calico's Secret Island. The player uses Bolt's Super Bark, Super Bite, and Super Speed to battle enemies and level bosses. One difference between the various platforms are the "host" characters, or the lack thereof. For instance, in the Wii edition, Rhino is the "host", appearing at the beginning and end of the game, and making comments when the "pause" button is selected. In the mobile game, Rhino and Mittens are both seen before and after each level as watching the Bolt TV show. And in the DS version, there's no "host" character to be seen (even though Rhino does get his own mini-game), but letters are displayed onscreen, informing the user on the storyline.

== Reception ==
Reception

Aggregate score
Aggregator	Score					
Aggregator	DS	PC	PS2	PS3	Wii	Xbox 360
Metacritic	48/100	50/100	52/100	59/100	50/100	57/100

Review scores
Publication	Score					
Publication	DS	PC	PS2	PS3	Wii	Xbox 360
Famitsu	23/40	N/A	N/A	N/A	N/A	N/A
GameRevolution	C−	N/A	N/A	N/A	N/A	N/A
GameSpot	4.5/10	N/A	N/A	7/10	N/A	7/10
GameZone	4/10	N/A	N/A	7/10	N/A	6.5/10
IGN	4.5/10	N/A	5.1/10	5.1/10	5.1/10	5.1/10
PlayStation Official Magazine – UK	N/A	N/A	N/A	6/10	N/A	N/A
Official Xbox Magazine (UK)	N/A	N/A	N/A	N/A	N/A	3/10
Official Xbox Magazine (US)	N/A	N/A	N/A	N/A	N/A	7/10
PSM3	N/A	N/A	N/A	44%	N/A	N/A
TeamXbox	N/A	N/A	N/A	N/A	N/A	5.3/10
The Daily Telegraph	N/A	N/A	N/A	N/A	N/A	6/10
Variety	N/A	N/A	N/A	N/A	N/A	(unfavorable)

Bolt received "mixed" reviews on all platforms except the DS version, which received "generally unfavorable reviews", according to the review aggregation website Metacritic. Ryan Clements of IGN criticized the bland story of the console versions, which he described as "paper thin". He also criticized said versions' optimization, boring voice acting and repetitive music, as well as their short lasting appeal. In Japan, where the DS version was ported for release on August 13, 2009, Famitsu gave it a score of three sixes and one five for a total of 23 out of 40.
