= Bolt (2008 film) =

2008 American Walt Disney animated film

- Theatrical release poster
- Directed by: Chris Williams; Byron Howard
- Screenplay by: Dan Fogelman; Chris Williams
- Story by: Chris Sanders
- Produced by: Clark Spencer
- Starring: John Travolta; Miley Cyrus
- Edited by: Tim Mertens
- Music by: John Powell
- Production company: Walt Disney Animation Studios
- Distributed by: Walt Disney Studios Motion Pictures (Note: Distributed under the Walt Disney Pictures banner.)
- Release dates: November 17, 2008 (El Capitan Theatre); November 21, 2008 (United States)
- Running time: 96 minutes
- Country: United States
- Language: English
- Budget: $150 million
- Box office: $310 million

Bolt is a 2008 American animated adventure comedy film produced by Walt Disney Animation Studios. It was directed by Chris Williams and Byron Howard, written by Williams and Dan Fogelman, and features the voices of John Travolta and Miley Cyrus. The film's plot centers on a dog named Bolt (Travolta), who has spent his entire life on the set of a television series and firmly believes that he has superpowers.

Bolt premiered at the El Capitan Theatre in Hollywood, Los Angeles, on November 17, 2008, and was released in the United States on November 21, by Walt Disney Studios Motion Pictures. The film received positive reviews from critics and grossed $310 million against a $150 million budget. It is regarded as helping to instigate a rebirth of Walt Disney Animation Studios, setting the studio in a new creative direction that led to other critically acclaimed features such as Tangled (2010) and Frozen (2013).

The film was nominated for several awards, including the Academy Award and the Golden Globe for Best Animated Feature, and Golden Globe Award for Best Original Song.

== Plot ==
A White Shepherd puppy named Bolt is adopted by a 7-year-old girl named Penny. Five years later, Bolt and Penny star in a hit television series named after Bolt, in which the two fight crime and foil the plans of the villain, Dr. Calico, (who Bolt dubs "The Green Eyed Man") who has kidnapped Penny's father, with Bolt using various superpowers in their adventures. To gain a more realistic performance from Bolt, the show's director has arranged the special effects in such a way that Bolt believes everything in the show is real, including his powers. This means Bolt can never leave the set and live as a normal dog, much to Penny's dismay. Although the show is popular, its predictable structure and reliance on clichés has resulted in a ratings decline, and it faces cancellation.

The show's creators attempt to solve the problem via a cliffhanger episode wherein Penny is kidnapped. Believing that she is in actual danger, Bolt escapes from his on-set trailer in Hollywood but knocks himself unconscious and falls into a box of packing peanuts, which is then shipped to New York City. Upon arrival, Bolt is shocked to discover that his "superpowers" are actually useless. While searching for Dr. Calico and Penny, Bolt meets a group of pigeons who lead him to Mittens, a cynical feral cat who he believes is an "agent" of Calico and forces her to guide him back to California. The two travel to Ohio by stowing away in a U-Haul truck. Meanwhile, in Hollywood, a less-experienced White Swiss Shepherd dog is brought in so filming can resume. Penny is distraught over Bolt's disappearance but reluctantly agrees to halt the search so production can continue.

Upon arriving in Ohio, Bolt and Mittens go to an RV park where they are joined by Rhino, a fearless hamster and huge fan of Bolt. Rhino's description of Bolt's adventures causes Mittens to realize Bolt is from a TV show, but she is unable to convince Bolt of the truth. In frustration, Bolt repeatedly attempts to "superbark" at Mittens, but the noise draws the attention of the local animal control service, and Bolt and Mittens are both captured and taken to a shelter.

Bolt, freed from the patrol van by Rhino, finally realizes and accepts that he is just a normal dog. However, he regains his confidence after Rhino (oblivious to the revelation) gives him a motivating speech, and they later rescue Mittens from the shelter. As they travel west, Bolt and Mittens form a close friendship; she teaches him how to be an ordinary dog and enjoy typical dog activities. Mittens makes plans for the three of Bolt's group to stay in Las Vegas, but Bolt is still determined to find Penny. Mittens reveals to Bolt that she was declawed and abandoned by her owners and believes that no human truly "loves" their pet. Bolt vehemently disagrees with her and continues on alone to Los Angeles. After finding out about Bolt's departure, Rhino decides to follow Bolt to Hollywood and convinces Mittens to come with him.

When Bolt reaches California and the studio, he finds Penny embracing the replacement dog during a rehearsal, and, believing that she has replaced him, leaves feeling heartbroken. Mittens, who has caught up to him and witnessed the events, reassures Bolt that Penny does love him. At the same time, the Bolt look-alike panics during the filming of a fight scene and accidentally knocks over lit tiki torches, setting the stage on fire with Penny trapped inside. With the help of Mittens and Rhino, Bolt goes inside the burning studio and the two reunite but are unable to escape and Penny begins to suffocate from the smoke. Bolt stays with Penny and repeatedly superbarks into the building's air vent, alerting the firefighters to their location, and they are rescued.

Penny and her mother quit the show after her agent proposes that they exploit the incident for publicity. The show continues with new actors replacing Bolt and Penny and a new storyline involving alien abduction. Penny adopts Mittens and Rhino, and they move to a rural home to enjoy a quieter life together.

== Voice cast ==
- John Travolta as Bolt, a White Shepherd
- Miley Cyrus as Penny Forrester, the owner of Bolt
  - Chloë Grace Moretz as young Penny Forrester
- Susie Essman as Mittens, a hot-tempered and cynical stray Tuxedo cat
- Mark Walton as Rhino, a hamster who watches the Bolt TV show
- Malcolm McDowell as Dr. Calico, a mad scientist and the main antagonist of the Bolt TV show
- Greg Germann as The Agent, an unnamed Hollywood agent that represents Bolt and Penny
- James Lipton as The Director, the unnamed director of the Bolt TV series
- Kari Wahlgren as Mindy Parker, the broadcaster of the network that airs Bolt
- Grey DeLisle as Mrs. Forrester, Penny's mother
- Sean Donnellan as Penny's TV dad, an unnamed scientist and Penny's fictional father in the Bolt TV series who enhanced Bolt
- Lino DiSalvo as Vinnie, a pigeon in New York City who teaches Bolt how to get his head unstuck from the fence
- Todd Cummings as Joey, a pigeon in New York City
- Tim Mertens as Bobby, a pigeon in New York City
- Nick Swardson as Blake, a pigeon in Hollywood
- J. P. Manoux as Tom, a pigeon in Hollywood
- Dan Fogelman as Billy, a pigeon in Hollywood
- Diedrich Bader as Veteran Cat, a cat actor who portrays one of Dr. Calico's pet cats
- Kelly Hoover as Ester, an animal control officer
- Brian Stepanek as Martin, an animal control officer
- Jeff Bennett as Lloyd, an animal control officer who catches Bolt and Mittens
- Daran Norris as Louie, a pigeon in New York City who brings a crumb to Mittens
- John DiMaggio as Saul, a pigeon in New York City who brings food to Mittens
- Randy Savage as Thug, an underling of Dr. Calico on the Bolt TV series
- Ronn Moss as Dr. Forrester, a doctor who tended to the fictional Penny's injuries
- Jenny Lewis as the assistant director of the Bolt TV series

== Production ==
=== Development ===
In November 2002, Chris Sanders and Dean DeBlois, the directors of Lilo & Stitch (2002), had signed a multi-picture deal with Walt Disney Pictures. It was also reported Sanders was working on an untitled computer-animated film. Nearly a year later, in November 2003, the project had been titled American Dog. The plot centered on Henry, a famous canine star, who one day finds himself stranded in the Nevada desert with a testy, one-eyed cat and an oversized, radioactive rabbit who are themselves searching for new homes, all the while believing he is still on television. In August 2005, the project's conceptual artwork and synopsis were showcased publicly at the annual SIGGRAPH conference. By November 2005, American Dog had been slated for a summer 2008 release.

Following the corporate acquisition of Pixar Animation Studios, John Lasseter and Ed Catmull were respectively appointed as Chief Creative Officer and President of Walt Disney Animation Studios and Pixar. In the fall of 2006, Lasseter, along with other directors from Pixar and Disney, attended two screenings of the film and gave Sanders suggestive notes on how to improve the story. Catmull stated "somewhere along the way, the plot had also come to include a radioactive, cookie-selling Girl Scout zombie serial killer. I'm all for quirky ideas, but this one had metastasized."

In December 2006, Sanders was removed from the project. Within months, in 2007, he joined DreamWorks Animation. According to Lasseter, Sanders was replaced because he had resisted the changes that he and the other directors had suggested. Lasseter was quoted as saying: "Chris Sanders is extremely talented, but he couldn't take it to the place it had to be." Earlier, in December 2006, Disney had laid off about 160 employees within its animation division. In recent years, Sanders has stated he has no ill will over being removed from the film, and hoped he could revisit some of his ideas in the future. He approved of the final film and the changes made, stating: "I think it would have been frustrating if the movie were essentially the same but with only slight changes. And I suppose my scenes and storylines are still sitting there on the shelf. I could actually pull them out and do them again. But it would be completely different."

In February 2007, Lasseter confirmed Chris Williams and Byron Howard were the film's new directors. As directors, Williams focused on the story reels and layout while Howard tackled character design and animation. The radioactive rabbit and eyepatch-wearing cat characters were removed from the story while the dog Henry (now renamed Bolt) was redesigned into a White Shepherd with a lightning bolt-shaped patch that runs down the left side of his body. Furthermore, Lasseter ordered the American Southwest setting to be removed given his then-recent film Cars (2006) had a similar terrain. Following the story overhaul, the animation team was told to complete the animation in 18 months instead of the usual four years that is normally required to produce a computer-animated feature. On June 8, 2007, Disney announced that the film, retitled as Bolt, was scheduled to be released on November 21, 2008, in Disney Digital 3-D.

=== Animation ===
The look of the film was inspired by the paintings of Edward Hopper and the cinematography of Vilmos Zsigmond. New technology in non-photorealistic rendering (NPR) was used to give it a special visual appearance, a technique later used in Tangled (2010). To give the film's 3D backgrounds a hand-painted look, the company artists used new patented technology designed specifically for the film.

Bolt's characteristics are based on an amalgam of breeds, although the designers started with the American White Shepherd. Joe Moshier, lead character designer, said, "they American White Shepherds have really long ears, a trait that I tried to caricature in order to allow the animators to emphasize Bolt's expressiveness."

The design of Rhino in his plastic ball was based on executive producer John Lasseter's pet chinchilla, which was brought to an animators' retreat during the film's production.

== Music ==
Bolt (Original Motion Picture Soundtrack)

Soundtrack album by John Powell
- Released: November 18, 2008
- Recorded: 2008
- Length: 37:05
- Label: Walt Disney

The score to Bolt was composed by John Powell. The soundtrack featured the film's score and two original songs – "I Thought I Lost You" by Bolt's stars Miley Cyrus and John Travolta (nominated for a Golden Globe Award for Best Original Song on 2009) as well as "Barking at the Moon" by Rilo Kiley singer Jenny Lewis. The soundtrack was released on November 18, 2008.

Motörhead's song "Dog-Face Boy" (from their Sacrifice album) is in a scene in which a mailroom worker is listening to it on headphones while inadvertently wrapping Bolt up in a box that gets shipped to New York City.

The Japanese dub has a different ending theme called "Onaji Sora wo Miageteru" ("I Look Up at the Same Sky") by Natsu Kai.

=== Track listing ===
All music is composed by John Powell, except where noted.

Bolt (Original Motion Picture Soundtrack) track listing
No.	Title	Writer(s)	Artist(s)	Length
1.	"I Thought I Lost You"	Miley Cyrus; Jeffrey Steele	Cyrus; John Travolta	3:35
2.	"Barking at the Moon"	Jenny Lewis	Lewis	3:17
3.	"Meet Bolt"			1:49
4.	"Bolt Transforms"			1:00
5.	"Scooter Chase"			2:29
6.	"New York"			1:43
7.	"Meet Mittens"	Powell; James McKee Smith		1:25
8.	"The RV Park"			2:14
9.	"A Fast Train"			2:38
10.	"Where Were You On St. Rhino's Day?"			1:58
11.	"Sing-Along Rhino"			0:41
12.	"Saving Mittens"			1:02
13.	"House On Wheels"			3:07
14.	"Las Vegas"			2:01
15.	"A Friend In Need"			1:13
16.	"Rescuing Penny"			3:09
17.	"A Real Life Superbark"			0:46
18.	"Unbelievable TV"			1:20
19.	"Home At Last / Barking At the Moon (Reprise)"	Powell; Lewis	Powell; Lewis	1:29
Total length:				37:05

== Release ==
Bolt had its world premiere on November 17, 2008, in Hollywood, Los Angeles, at the El Capitan Theatre. It was commercially released in theaters in the United States on November 21, 2008. By its fourth week in theaters, the film was accompanied by Pixar's Cars Toons short Tokyo Mater.

=== Home media ===
Bolt was released on Blu-ray in the United States on March 22, 2009. The Blu-ray combo set included a standard DVD and digital copy versions of the film. Single-disc DVD and Special Edition DVD with Digital Copy versions followed in Region 1 on March 24. This marked the first time a major home-video release debuted on Blu-ray Disc before DVD. Bolt was released on both Blu-ray and DVD in the United Kingdom on June 15, 2009.

A short film called Super Rhino is included in the DVD and Blu-ray versions of the film. By December 2009, the DVD has sold over 4.5 million copies, generating $81.01 million in consumer sales.

The 3D Blu-ray version of the film was released in November 2010, in France and UK. A month later, it was released worldwide exclusively to select Sony TVs. In the United States, it was released on November 8, 2011.

== Reception ==
=== Box office ===
On its opening weekend, the film opened in third place, earning $26.2 million behind Twilight and Quantum of Solace. On its second weekend, it rose to second place, earning nearly $26.6 million behind Four Christmases. Overall, Bolt grossed $114.1 million in the United States and Canada and $195.9 million in international territories, totaling $310 million worldwide.

=== Critical reaction ===
Upon release, Bolt received generally positive reviews. On the review aggregator website Rotten Tomatoes, 90% of 191 critics' reviews are positive, with an average rating of 7.2/10. The website's consensus reads: "Bolt is a pleasant animated comedy that overcomes the story's familiarity with strong visuals and likable characters." Metacritic, which uses a weighted average, assigned the film a score of 67 out of 100, based on 29 critics, indicating "generally favorable" reviews. Audiences polled by CinemaScore gave the film an average grade of "A−" on an A+ to F scale.

Kenneth Turan of the Los Angeles Times wrote that Bolt was "a sweet Disney family film, but Lasseter's oversight has made it smarter than it otherwise would have been. It's not in Pixar's league, but it's laced with idiosyncratic characters with pleasantly wacky attitudes. That may sound like the obvious thing to do but that doesn't mean anyone else has done it." Michael Rechtshaffen of The Hollywood Reporter felt the film was a "notable step up for Walt Disney Animation Studios", although he felt the script needed "more of a comedic punch, with fuller character quirks and complexities to go along with the enhanced visual dimension." Nevertheless, Rechtshaffen complimented the vocal performances from Travolta, Cyrus, and Malcolm McDowell. Todd McCarthy, reviewing for Variety, noted the film was an "OK Disney animated entry enhanced by nifty 3-D projection" as it "bears some telltale signs of Pixar's trademark smarts, but still looks like a mutt compared to the younger company's customary purebreds."

A. O. Scott of The New York Times complimented the film as "a real movie[,] not a great one, perhaps, but a more organic and thought-out piece of work than the usual animated hodgepodge that lures antsy children and their dutiful parents into the multiplexes. It has its sentimental strains, but it doesn't push them too hard, or resort to the crude, pandering humor of, say, the Shrek franchise." Perry Seibert of TV Guide gave the film 3 stars out of 4 and wrote the film "amuses both those who make up the film's target audience and the parents along for the ride. This winning mix of exciting action, heart-tugging sentiment, and gentle character comedy makes Bolt yet another solid addition to Disney's history of family-friendly fare." Tasha Robinson of The A.V. Club gave the film a B+, stating that "Bolt is the studio's first film since Lilo & Stitch that feels like it's trying to recapture the old Disney instead of aggressively shedding it in favor of something slick and new. And yet it comes with a healthy cutting-edge Pixar flavor as well."

Michael Phillips of the Chicago Tribune awarded the film 1 1/2 stars out of four, writing he personally "felt abandoned just watching it. It's a seriously withholding action comedy, stingy on the wit, charm, jokes, narrative satisfactions and animals with personalities sharp enough for the big screen, either in 2-D or 3-D. I saw it in 3-D, which helped, especially with an early, massively destructive chase through the streets and freeways of Los Angeles. Plus, the herky-jerky movements in the head and neck region of three credulous pigeons -- those were funny." Joe Morgenstern of The Wall Street Journal wrote: "I did not find Bolt lovable. Likable, yes, and occasionally endearing -- yet the best parts involve a hamster in a plastic ball. The movie dog's confusions are entertaining, though they're familiar to anyone who has seen Buzz Lightyear in Pixar's peerless Toy Story films. But the spunk of the hamster, a corpulent rodent named Rhino, is stirring, and there's a timeless purity to the spectacle of him scurrying around in his private little sphere."

=== Accolades ===
Bolt was nominated for the following awards:

Year	Organization	Award Nominated For	Result	Ref.
2008	81st Academy Awards	Academy Award for Best Animated Feature	lost to WALL-E	
2008	36th Annie Awards	Annie Award for Best Animated Feature	lost to Kung Fu Panda	
2008	36th Annie Awards	Annie Award for Outstanding Achievement for Animated Effects in an Animated Production	lost to Kung Fu Panda	
2008	36th Annie Awards	Annie Award for Outstanding Achievement for Voice Acting in a Feature Production	lost to Kung Fu Panda	
2008	14th Critics' Choice Awards	Broadcast Film Critics Association Award for Best Animated Feature	lost to WALL-E	
2008	Chicago Film Critics Association Awards 2008	Chicago Film Critics Association Award for Best Animated Film	lost to WALL-E	
2008	66th Golden Globe Awards	Golden Globe Award for Best Animated Feature Film	lost to WALL-E	
2008	66th Golden Globe Awards	Golden Globe Award for Best Original Song	lost to The Wrestler	
2008	Online Film Critics Society Awards 2008	Online Film Critics Society Award for Best Animated Film	lost to WALL-E	
2008	20th Producers Guild of America Awards	Producers Guild of America Award for Best Animated Motion Picture	lost to WALL-E	
2008	13th Satellite Awards	Satellite Award for Best Animated or Mixed Media Feature	lost to WALL-E	
2009	2009 Kids' Choice Awards	Kids' Choice Awards for Favorite Animated Movie	lost to Madagascar: Escape 2 Africa	
2009	7th Visual Effects Society Awards	Visual Effects Society Award for Outstanding Animation in an Animated Feature Motion Picture	lost to WALL-E	
2009	7th Visual Effects Society Awards	Visual Effects Society Award for Outstanding Animated Character in an Animated Feature (two nominations for "Bolt" and "Rhino")	lost to WALL-E	
2009	7th Visual Effects Society Awards	Visual Effects Society Award for Outstanding Effects Animation in an Animated Feature	lost to WALL-E	

== Video games ==
Disney Interactive Studios produced a video game based on the film, released in November 2008 for Nintendo DS, Wii, PlayStation 2, PlayStation 3, Xbox 360 and PC. The game focuses on Bolt's fake TV life, not the actual storyline. A separate game was released for mobile phones, and a third game, RhinoBall, was released as an application on Apple's App Store.
