= White Shepherd =

Dog breed

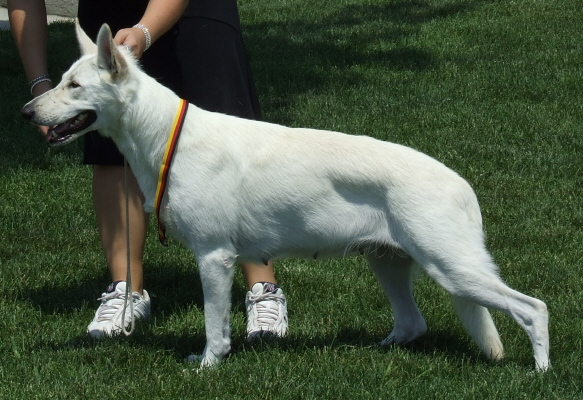
- Other names: White German Shepherd; American-Canadian White Shepherd Dog
- Origin: United States
- Foundation stock: German Shepherd
Traits
| Height | Males | 25 in (64 cm) ideal |
| | Females | 23 in (58 cm) ideal |
| Weight | Males | 75–85 lb (34–39 kg) |
| | Females | 60–70 lb (27–32 kg) |
- Coat: Double coat that is straight and dense
- Color: White, off white
Kennel club standards
- United Kennel Club: standard

The White Shepherd, also called the American-Canadian White Shepherd Dog, is a variety of the German Shepherd bred in the United States. Although white-coated German Shepherds have been known in Europe as early as 1882, in 1933 the breed standard was amended in their native Germany, banning white-coated dogs from registration. In the United States and Canada the coloration had gained a following and in 1969 a breed club was formed specifically for white-coloured German Shepherds, calling their variety the White Shepherd. The variety is recognized as a separate breed by the United Kennel Club.

According to the breed standard of the United Kennel Club, the ideal height of a White Shepherd dog is 25 inches (64 cm) and the ideal weight is between 75 and 85 pounds (34 and 39 kg), while bitches ideally stand 23 inches (58 cm) and weigh between 60 and 70 pounds (27 and 32 kg). The breed standard states they have a straight, dense, weather-resistant double coat that ideally is pure white, although light cream or light tan is acceptable.

== History ==
The gene for a white coat has existed in German Shepherds since the breed's inception. In 1917, the first White German Shepherds were registered with the American Kennel Club. They were still allowed to be shown in American competitions until 1968. The Canadian Kennel Club allowed White Shepherds to compete in dog shows until 1980, following pressure from the German Shepherd Club of Canada.

Geraldine Rockefeller Dodge pictured with several White Shepherds, as well as two standard German Shepherds

In the breed's native Germany, a backlash against the white coat began in the 1960s. After falling out of favor for some years, White Shepherds began to become popular in 1970s Switzerland, and this popularity slowly reached the rest of Europe. In 2019, a minor controversy erupted in the United Kingdom, when some fraudulent breeders sold White Shepherd puppies, passing them off as more valuable White Swiss Shepherd puppies. The Royal Kennel Club issued a warning about the practice.

== Recognition ==
The White Shepherd is not considered a valid breed by most kennel clubs, and is not allowed in most major dog shows. The Fédération Cynologique Internationale does not recognize white German Shepherds. The American Kennel Club, Canadian Kennel Club, and Royal Kennel Club breed standards all disqualify German shepherds in the showring if they are white, with the latter describing white as a "highly undesirable" trait. However, the AKC and CKC allow White Shepherds to compete in tracking and herding competitions, and the AKC does allow such dogs to be registered as purebreds.

The United Kennel Club recognizes the White Shepherd as its own breed distinct from the German Shepherd, and has its own breed standard for it. The White Shepherd is also recognized as its own breed in Switzerland, Denmark, and the Czech Republic. Clubs dedicated to the breed include the White and Long Coat Shepherd Society (UK based), White German Shepherd Club of America, and the White German Shepherd Club International.

== Description ==
A White Shepherd and standard German Shepherd

According to the breed standard of the United Kennel Club, the ideal height of a White Shepherd dog is 25 inches (64 cm) and the ideal weight is between 75 and 85 pounds (34 and 39 kg), while bitches ideally stand 23 inches (58 cm) and weigh between 60 and 70 pounds (27 and 32 kg). The breed standard states they have a straight, dense, weather-resistant double coat that ideally is pure white, although light cream or light tan is acceptable.

The White Shepherd is not albino; the white coat is instead cause by a recessive gene. White Shepherds result when two German Shepherd parents carry that gene. Unlike many other white dogs, there is no evidence that they are more prone to deafness. White Shepherds can be used for many of the same purposes as German Shepherds, like police work, guiding the blind, or as therapy dogs.
