= 23rd Saturn Awards =

US film and television award ceremony

- Date: July 23, 1997
- Site: California, U.S.

Highlights
- Most awards: Independence Day (3); Scream (3); Star Trek: First Contact (3)
- Most nominations: Independence Day (11)

The 23rd Saturn Awards, honoring the best in science fiction, fantasy and horror film and television in 1996, were held on July 23, 1997.

Below is a complete list of nominees and winners. Winners are highlighted in bold.

== Winners and nominees ==
=== Film ===
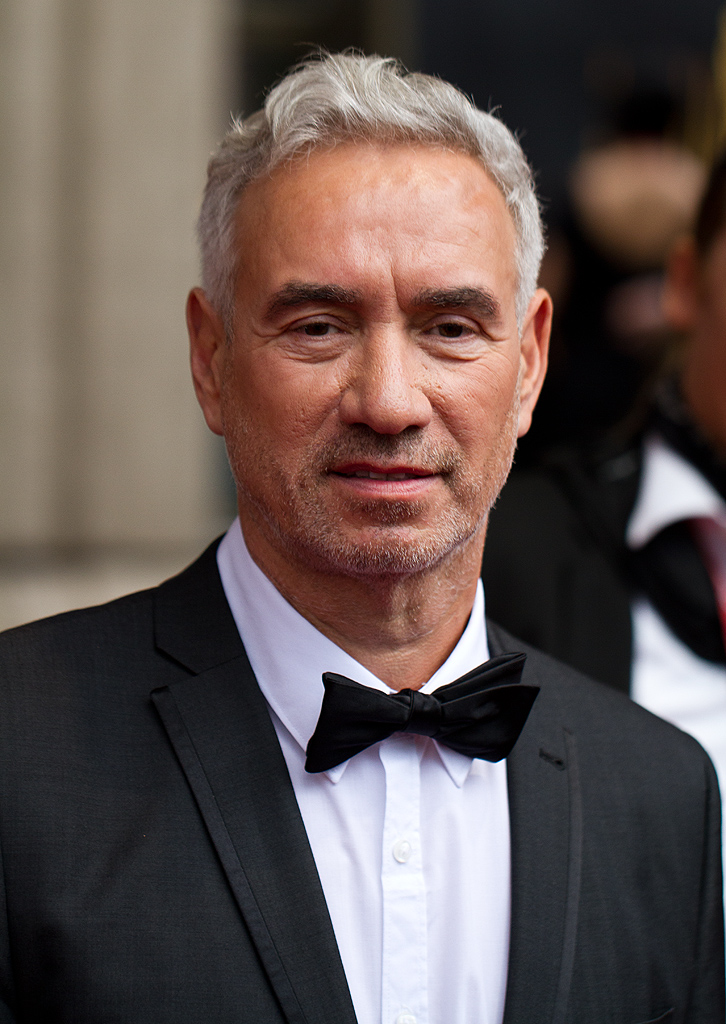
Roland Emmerich, Best Director winner

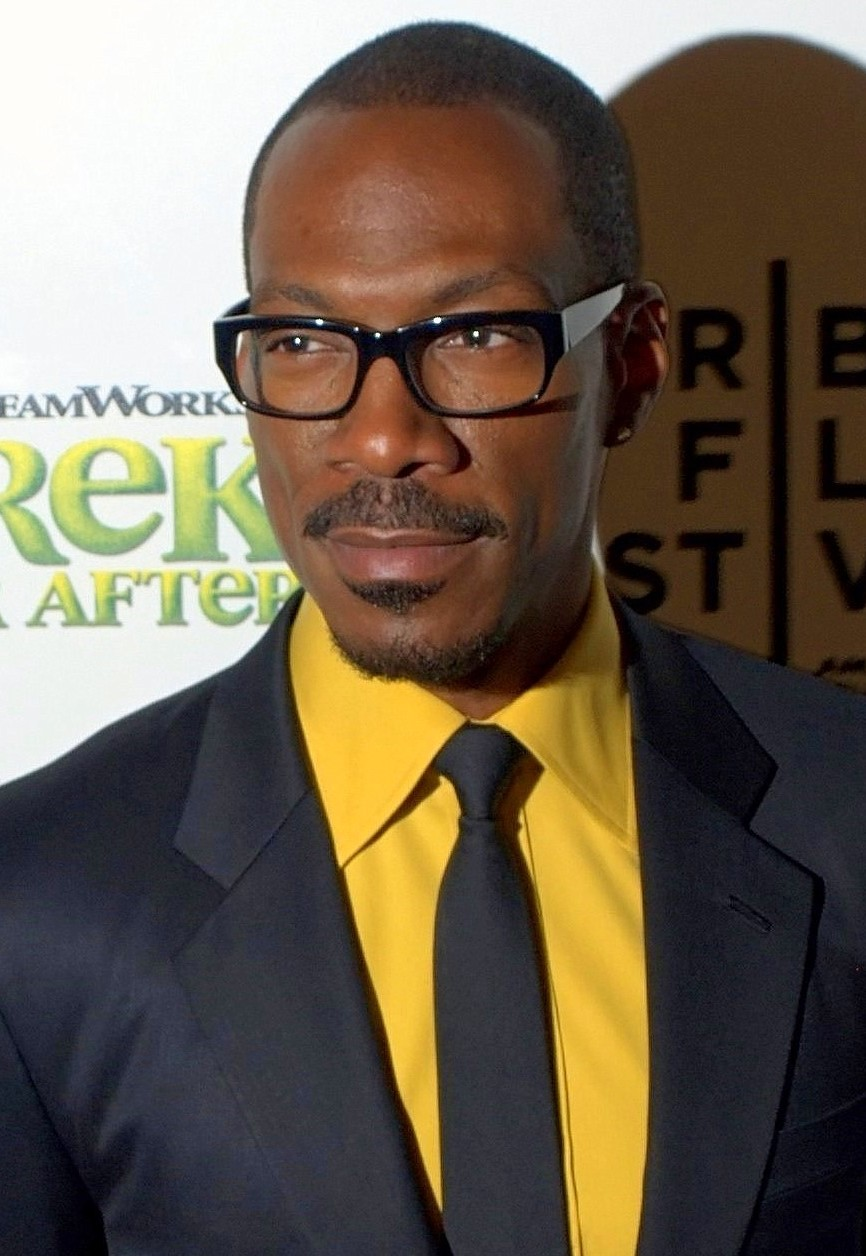
Eddie Murphy, Best Actor winner

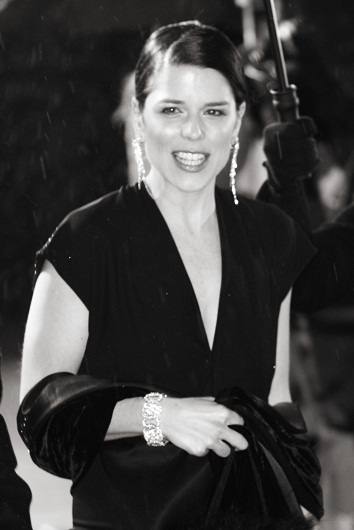
Neve Campbell, Best Actress winner

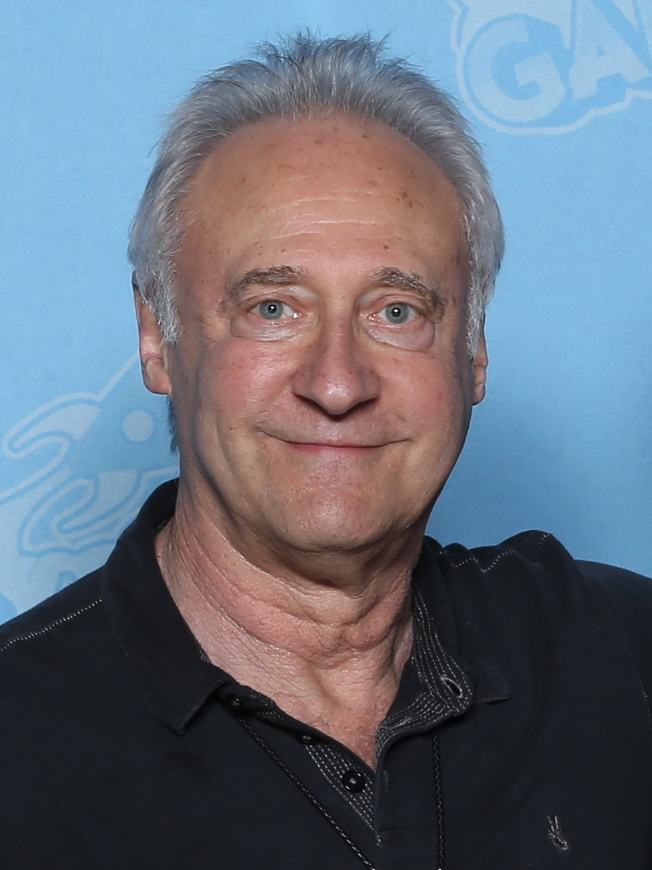
Brent Spiner, Best Supporting Actor winner

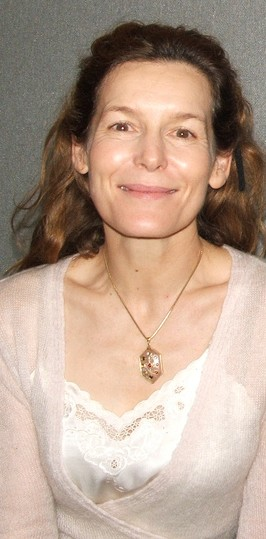
Alice Krige, Best Supporting Actress winner

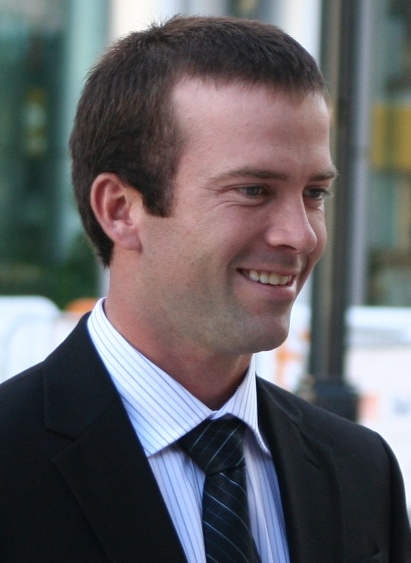
Lucas Black, Best Performance by a Younger Actor winner

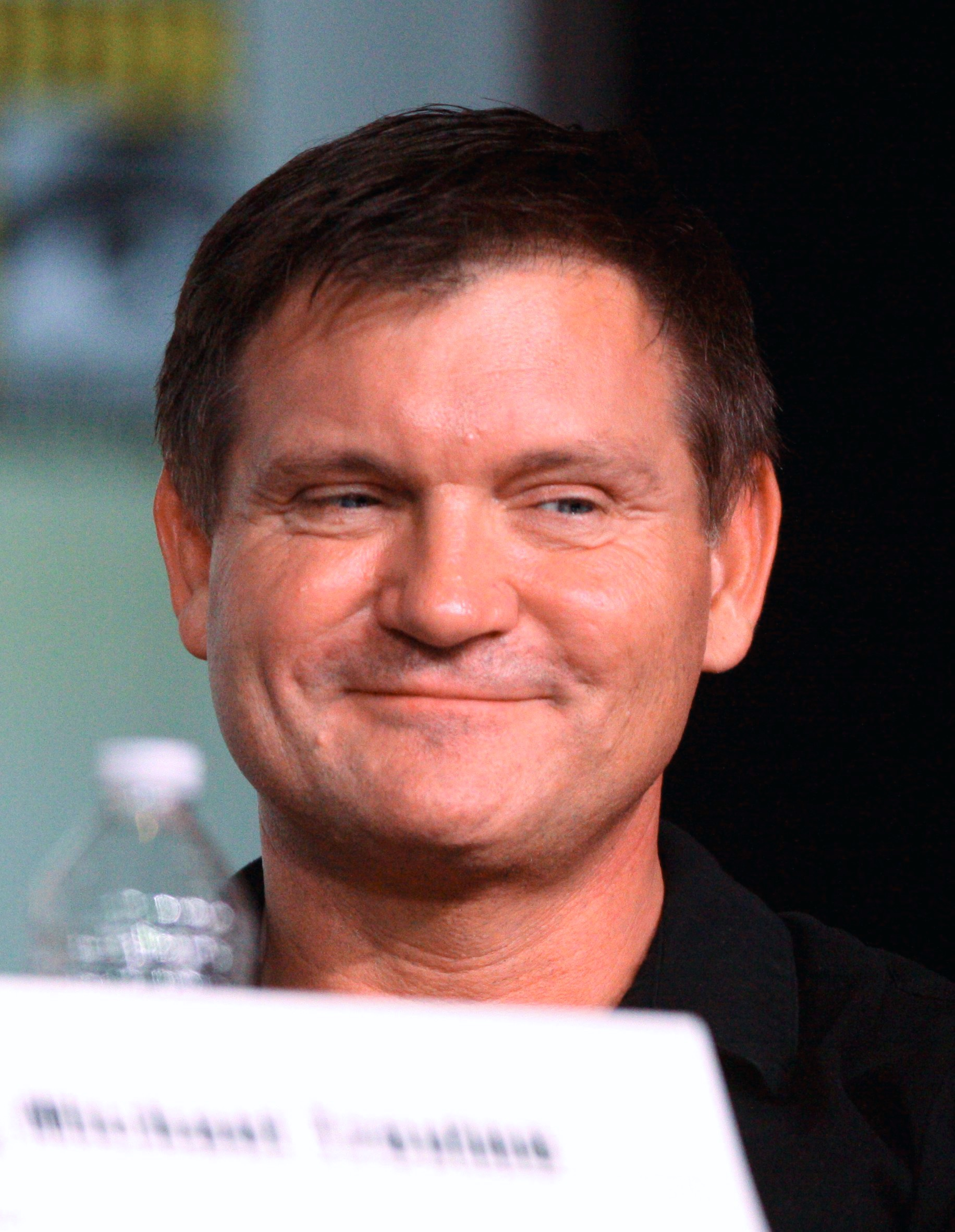
Kevin Williamson, Best Writing winner

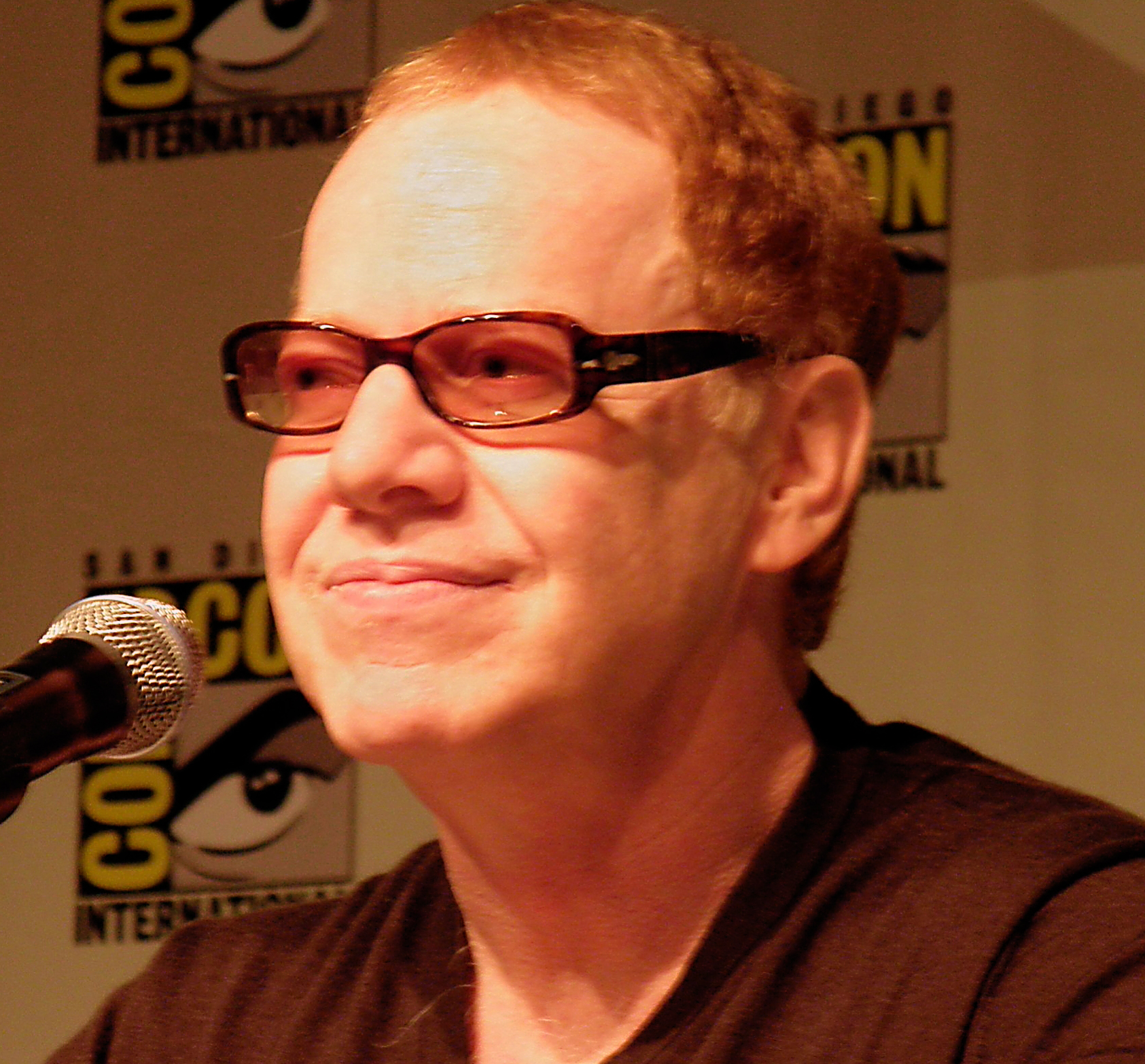
Danny Elfman, Best Music winner

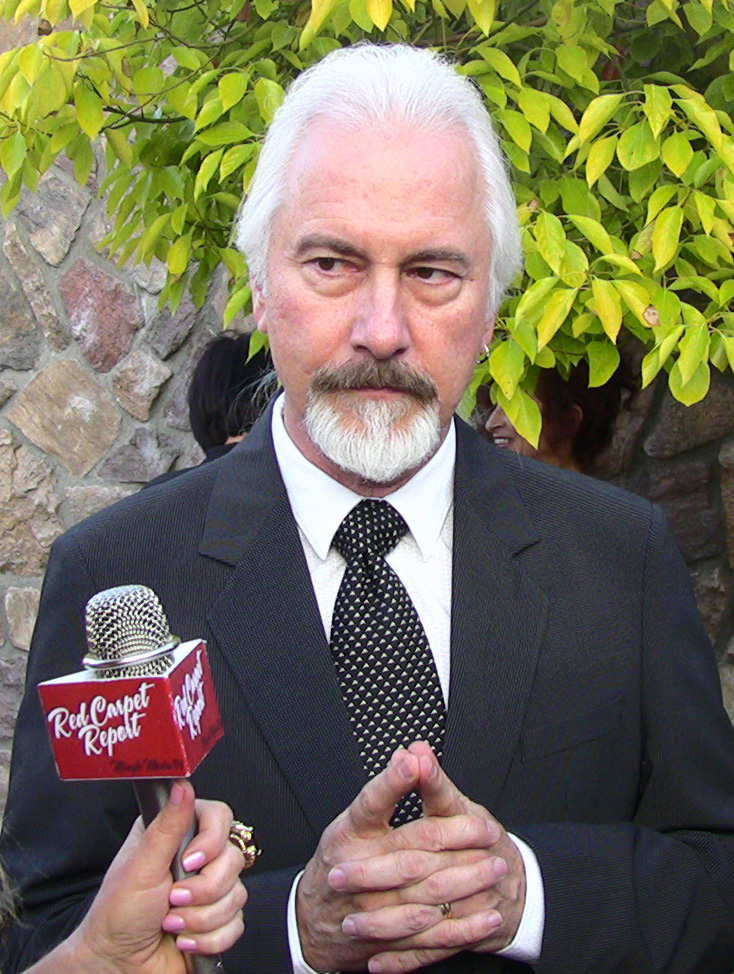
Rick Baker, Best Make-up co-winner

Best Science Fiction Film	Best Fantasy Film
**Independence Day**; Escape from L.A.; The Island of Dr. Moreau; Mars Attacks!; Mystery Science Theater 3000: The Movie; Star Trek: First Contact	**Dragonheart**; The Adventures of Pinocchio; The Hunchback of Notre Dame; James and the Giant Peach; Matilda; The Nutty Professor; Phenomenon
Best Horror Film	Best Action/Adventure/Thriller Film
**Scream**; Cemetery Man; The Craft; Curdled; The Frighteners; The Relic	**Fargo**; Bound; Mission: Impossible; Ransom; The Rock; Twister
Best Actor	Best Actress
**Eddie Murphy – The Nutty Professor as Sherman Klump / Buddy Love / Lance Perkins / Papa Klump / Mama Klump / Grandma Klump / Ernie Klump**; Michael J. Fox – The Frighteners as Frank Bannister; Jeff Goldblum – Independence Day as David Levinson; Bill Paxton – Twister as Bill Harding; Will Smith – Independence Day as Capt. Steven Hiller; Patrick Stewart – Star Trek: First Contact as Jean-Luc Picard	**Neve Campbell – Scream as Sidney Prescott**; Geena Davis – The Long Kiss Goodnight as Samantha Caine (Charly); Gina Gershon – Bound as Corky; Helen Hunt – Twister as Dr. Joanne "Jo" Harding; Frances McDormand – Fargo as Marge Gunderson; Penelope Ann Miller – The Relic as Dr. Margo Green
Best Supporting Actor	Best Supporting Actress
**Brent Spiner – Star Trek: First Contact as Data**; Jeffrey Combs – The Frighteners as Milton Dammers; Edward Norton – Primal Fear as Aaron Stampler / Roy; Joe Pantoliano – Bound as Caesar; Brent Spiner – Independence Day as Dr. Brakish Okun; Skeet Ulrich – Scream as Billy Loomis	**Alice Krige – Star Trek: First Contact as Borg Queen**; Fairuza Balk – The Craft as Nancy Downs; Drew Barrymore – Scream as Casey Becker; Glenn Close – Mars Attacks! as First Lady Marsha Dale; Pam Ferris – Matilda as Agatha Trunchbull; Vivica A. Fox – Independence Day as Jasmine Dubrow; Jennifer Tilly – Bound as Violet
Best Performance by a Younger Actor	Best Director
**Lucas Black – Sling Blade as Frank Wheatly**; Kevin Bishop – Muppet Treasure Island as Jim Hawkins; James Duval – Independence Day as Miguel; Lukas Haas – Mars Attacks! as Richie Norris; Jonathan Taylor Thomas – The Adventures of Pinocchio as Pinocchio; Mara Wilson – Matilda as Matilda Wormwood	**Roland Emmerich – Independence Day**; Tim Burton – Mars Attacks!; Joel Coen – Fargo; Wes Craven – Scream; Jonathan Frakes – Star Trek: First Contact; Peter Jackson – The Frighteners
Best Writing	Best Costumes
**Kevin Williamson – Scream**; Brannon Braga and Ronald D. Moore – Star Trek: First Contact; Dean Devlin and Roland Emmerich – Independence Day; Jonathan Gems – Mars Attacks!; The Wachowskis – Bound; Fran Walsh and Peter Jackson – The Frighteners	**Star Trek: First Contact – Deborah Everton**; Dragonheart – Thomas Casterline and Anna B. Sheppard; Escape from L.A. – Robin Michel Bush; Independence Day – Joseph A. Porro; Mars Attacks! – Colleen Atwood; Romeo + Juliet – Kym Barrett
Best Make-up	Best Music
**The Nutty Professor – Rick Baker and David LeRoy Anderson**; The Frighteners – Rick Baker and Richard Taylor; The Island of Dr. Moreau – Stan Winston and Shane Mahan; Mary Reilly – Jenny Shircore and Peter Owen; Star Trek: First Contact – Michael Westmore, Scott Wheeler, and Jake Garber; Thinner – Greg Cannom	**Danny Elfman – Mars Attacks!**; David Arnold – Independence Day; Randy Edelman – Dragonheart; Danny Elfman – The Frighteners; Jerry Goldsmith – Star Trek: First Contact; Nick Glennie-Smith, Hans Zimmer, and Harry Gregson-Williams – The Rock
Best Special Effects	Best Home Video Release
**Independence Day – Volker Engel, Clay Pinney, Douglas Smith, and Joe Viskocil**; Dragonheart – Scott Squires, Phil Tippett, James Straus, and Kit West; The Frighteners – Wes Takahashi, Charlie McClellan, and Richard Taylor; Mars Attacks! – Jim Mitchell, Michael L. Fink, David Andrews, and Michael Lantieri (Industrial Light & Magic (ILM), Warner Digital Studios); Star Trek: First Contact – John Knoll (Industrial Light & Magic (ILM)); Twister – Stefen Fangmeier, John Frazier, Habib Zargarpour, and Henry LaBounta	**The Arrival**; La machine; Necronomicon: Book of Dead; Pinocchio's Revenge; Tremors 2: Aftershocks; Within the Rock

=== Television ===
==== Programs ====
Best Genre Network TV Series	Best Genre Syndicated TV Series
**The X-Files (Fox)**; Dark Skies (NBC); Early Edition (CBS); Millennium (Fox); The Simpsons (Fox); Sliders (Fox)	**The Outer Limits (Showtime)**; Babylon 5 (Syndicated); Highlander: The Series (Syndicated); The New Adventures of Robin Hood (TNT); Poltergeist: The Legacy (Showtime); Star Trek: Deep Space Nine (Syndicated)
Best Single Genre Television Presentation
**Doctor Who: The Movie (Fox)**; Alien Nation: The Enemy Within (Fox); The Beast (NBC); The Canterville Ghost (ABC); Gulliver's Travels (NBC); The Lottery (NBC)

==== Acting ====
Best Genre TV Actor	Best Genre TV Actress
**Kyle Chandler – Early Edition (CBS) as Gary Hobson**; Avery Brooks – Star Trek: Deep Space Nine (Syndicated) as Benjamin Sisko; Eric Close – Dark Skies (NBC) as John Loengard; David Duchovny – The X-Files (Fox) as Fox Mulder; Lance Henriksen – Millennium (Fox) as Frank Black; Paul McGann – Doctor Who: The Movie (Fox) as The Eighth Doctor	**Gillian Anderson – The X-Files (Fox) as Dana Scully**; Claudia Christian – Babylon 5 (Syndicated) as Susan Ivanova; Melissa Joan Hart – Sabrina the Teenage Witch (ABC) as Sabrina Spellman; Lucy Lawless – Xena: Warrior Princess (Syndicated) as Xena; Helen Shaver – Poltergeist: The Legacy (Showtime) as Rachel Corrigan; Megan Ward – Dark Skies (NBC) as Kimberly Sayers

=== Special awards ===
George Pal Memorial Award

- Kathleen Kennedy

Life Career Award

- Dino De Laurentiis
- John Frankenheimer
- Sylvester Stallone

President's Award

- Billy Bob Thornton

Service Award

- Edward Russell

Special Award

- Star Wars (for its 20th anniversary)
