= Coronado (2003 film) =

- Directed by: Claudio Fäh
- Written by: Volker Engel; Marc Weigert; Claudio Fäh
- Produced by: Volker Engel; Marc Weigert
- Starring: Kristin Dattilo; Clayton Rohner; Michael Lowry; John Rhys-Davies
- Cinematography: Anna Foerster; Jaime Reynoso; Steven Douglas Smith
- Edited by: Peter S. Elliot
- Music by: Ralf Wienrich
- Production companies: ARMS GmbH; Coronado Motion Picture LLC; Uncharted Territory
- Release date: August 16, 2003
- Running time: 88 minutes
- Countries: Germany; United States
- Languages: English; Spanish

Coronado is a 2003 German-American adventure film directed by Claudio Fäh in his directorial debut. It stars Kristin Dattilo, Clayton Rohner, Michael Lowry and John Rhys-Davies.

== Plot ==
Leaving Beverly Hills, Claire Winslow goes to Switzerland to deliver some forgotten papers to her business man fiancé (planning to surprise him). Once there, she is told he has gone to politically unstable El Coronado in Central America. She goes to El Coronado and discovers he may have been abducted by rebels. To find him, she gets involved with men supplying arms to the rebels and heads into the jungle.

== Cast ==
- Kristin Dattilo as Claire Winslow
- Clayton Rohner as Arnet McClure
- Michael Lowry as Will Gallagher
- John Rhys-Davies as President Hugo Luis Ramos

== Release ==
Coronado premiered on August 16, 2003 at the Hamburg Fantasy Filmfest. It was released on DVD on December 28, 2004.
