= Underdogs United =

Argentine animated television series

- Genre: Children; Adventures; Sports
- Based on: Metegol
- Country of origin: Argentina
- Original languages: Spanish; English; French
- No. of seasons: 1
- No. of episodes: 51

Production
- Executive producer: Juan José Campanella
- Running time: 11 minutes
- Production company: Mundoloco CGI

Original release
- Network: Discovery Kids (Latin America)
- Release: 7 March 2022 – present
- Network: HBO Max
- Release: February 16, 2024

Underdogs United, also known as Metegol: Underdogs United, is an Argentine animated series aimed at children. It is based on the film Metegol, produced by Cyber Group Studios and Mundoloco CGI, by Oscar winner Juan José Campanella. The series premiered on 7 March 2022 on Discovery Kids (Latin America). The series would later receive US release on HBO Max (temporarily Max at the time) on February 16, 2024.

The series is named after the heavily edited Americanized dub of the film produced by The Weinstein Company, Underdogs, despite the English version of this show being based on the original Spanish version of the film.

== Plot ==
Capi, Emma, Beto, Kiko and Gigi form a different football team: they are football players who, for humans, are in a common arcade. But when the lights go out and everyone in attendance leaves, the quintet breaks free from the metal foosball posts and goes through a magical portal that gives access to Sportsville, a world where different sports are everywhere.

== Cast ==
| Character | Original Actor | Dub Actor |
|---|---|---|
| Capi | Hernán Palma | Ryan Nicolls |
| Emma | Agustina Cirulnik | Monique Gabriel |
| Gigi | Mara Campanelli | Grace Choi |
| Kiko | Demián Velazco Rochwerger | Jeremy Levy |
| Beto | Mathias Rapisarda | Jason Yudoff |
| Worst | Pablo Gandolfo | Marc Thompson |

=== Additional Voices ===
- Grace Choi
- Monique Gabriel
- Jeremy Levy
- Ryan Nicolls
- Marc Thompson - Sergeant Referee, Chester, Mike Morales, Greta the Groundskeeper, Punchie Joe
- Jason Yudoff

== Production ==
The series was initially announced in 2015 under the title Underdogs, as a collaboration between Discovery Kids Latin America and Mundoloco CGI (the producers behind Metegol). It was planned to air on the channel alongside an animated adaptation of Floricienta and an original series titled Mini Beat Power Rockers (later tentatively renamed Baby Rockers). However, the series would not premiere until 2022, this time under a new title and with a different visual style.

Several differences existed between the series' original 2015 announcement and the final production. The most notable change was that the project originally retained the film's 3D animation style rather than the Flash animation used in the completed series. Other, less significant changes included Capi, Beto, and Loco (later renamed Kiko) retaining their original character designs; Emma having a lighter skin tone; Gigi having blue eyes instead of hazel eyes and a more detailed goalkeeper uniform; and Guru, the father figure and recurring character, being part of the main cast.

A brief clip from a music video released in 2020 suggests that the animation was more fluid and refined than in the final series. Additionally, the logo displayed in the upper-left corner incorporates elements from the American logo of the original film.

Juan José Campanella and Gastón Gorali, the director and screenwriter of Metegol, respectively, served as executive producers of the series.

== Episodes ==
| No. overall | No. in season | Title | Directed by | Written by | Original release date | Prod. code |
|---|---|---|---|---|---|---|
| 1 | 1 | "The Nasty Neighbor" | Unknown | Unknown | June 7, 2025 | |
| 2 | 2 | "The Pep Talk" | Unknown | Unknown | June 7, 2025 | |
| 31 | 31 | "Virtual Champion" | Unknown | Unknown | September 27, 2025 | |
| 32 | 32 | "The Chess Duel" | Unknown | Unknown | September 27, 2025 | |
