= Peter S. Elliot =

American film editor

- Born: October 20, 1962 (age 64); New York City, U.S.
- Other name: Peter Elliot
- Occupations: Film editor; visual effects editor
- Years active: 1991–present
- Notable work: 2012; Hop; Think Like a Man

Peter S. Elliot (born October 20, 1962) is an American film and visual effects editor. He is known for his editorial work on Garfield: A Tail of Two Kitties (2006), Fantastic Four: Rise of the Silver Surfer (2007), 2012 (2009), Hop (2011), Think Like a Man (2012), and Iron Man 3 (2013).

== Career ==
In 2009, Elliot served as an editor on 2012, a epic disaster film directed by Roland Emmerich and was nominated for Best Film Editing at the Satellite Awards.

== Filmography ==
=== Feature films ===
==== Editor ====
Year	Title	Director	Company	Notes
1994	Hellbound	Aaron Norris	Cannon Films	Editor (with Michael J. Duthie)
2003	Coronado	Claudio Fäh	Uncharted Territory	
2006	Garfield: A Tail of Two Kitties	Tim Hill	20th Century Fox	
2007	Fantastic Four: Rise of the Silver Surfer	Tim Story	20th Century Fox; Marvel Entertainment	with William Hoy
2009	2012	Roland Emmerich	Columbia Pictures	with David Brenner
2010	The Experiment	Paul T. Scheuring	Stage 6 Films	
2011	Hop	Tim Hill	Illumination Entertainment	with Gregory Perler
2012	Think Like a Man	Tim Story	Screen Gems	
2013	Iron Man 3	Shane Black	Marvel Studios	with Jeffrey Ford
2013	Battle of the Year	Benson Lee	Screen Gems	
2013	Marvel One-Shot: Agent Carter	Louis D'Esposito	Marvel Studios	Short film
2014	Think Like a Man Too	Tim Story	Screen Gems	
2016	Ride Along 2	Tim Story	Universal Pictures	
2017	Baywatch	Seth Gordon	Paramount Pictures	
2019	Shaft	Tim Story	Warner Bros. Pictures; New Line Cinema	
2020	The War with Grandpa	Tim Hill	101 Studios	with Craig Herring
2021	Tom & Jerry	Tim Story	Warner Animation Group	
2022	Thor: Love and Thunder	Taika Waititi	Marvel Studios	with Matthew Schmidt, Tim Roche, and Jennifer Vecchiarello
2023	The Blackening	Tim Story	Lionsgate Films	
2025	Back in Action	Seth Gordon	Netflix	
2026	72 Hours	Tim Story	Netflix	

==== Editorial department ====
Year	Title	Director	Company	Notes
1991	Delta Force 3: The Killing Game	Sam Firstenberg	Cannon Video	Associate editor; edited by Michael J. Duthie
1991	Eye of the Storm	Yuri Zeltser	Columbia TriStar	Associate editor; edited by Michael J. Duthie
1992	Universal Soldier	Roland Emmerich	TriStar Pictures	Additional editor; edited by Michael J. Duthie
1994	Stargate	Roland Emmerich	Metro-Goldwyn-Mayer	Additional editor; edited by Michael J. Duthie and Derek Brechin
1995	Judge Dredd	Danny Cannon	Hollywood Pictures	Associate editor; edited by Alex Mackie, Harry Keramidas, and Jeremy Gibbs; Credited as Peter Elliot
1999	Stigmata	Rupert Wainwright	Metro-Goldwyn-Mayer	First assistant editor; edited by Michael R. Miller; Credited as Peter Elliot
2004	The Day After Tomorrow	Roland Emmerich	20th Century Fox	Additional editor; edited by David Brenner
2007	Alvin and the Chipmunks	Tim Hill	Fox 2000 Pictures; Regency Enterprises	
2011	Captain America: The First Avenger	Joe Johnston	Marvel Studios	Additional editor; edited by Jeffrey Ford and Robert Dalva; Credited as Peter Elliot
2019	Avengers: Endgame	Anthony Russo; Joe Russo	Marvel Studios	Additional editor; edited by Jeffrey Ford and Matthew Schmidt
2019	It Chapter Two	Andy Muschietti	Warner Bros. Pictures; New Line Cinema; Double Dream; Vertigo Entertainment; Rideback	Additional editor; edited by Jason Ballantine; Credited as Peter Elliott

==== Visual effects department ====
Year	Title	Director	Company	Notes
1996	Independence Day	Roland Emmerich	20th Century Fox; Centropolis Entertainment	Visual effects editor
1997	Volcano	Mick Jackson	Fox 2000 Pictures	Visual effects editor
1998	Godzilla	Roland Emmerich	TriStar Pictures	Visual effects editor
1999	Stigmata	Rupert Wainwright	Metro-Goldwyn-Mayer	Visual effects editor Credited as Peter Elliot
2000	Hollow Man	Paul Verhoeven	Columbia Pictures	Senior visual effects editor (Sony Pictures Imageworks)
2001	Dr. Dolittle 2	Steve Carr	20th Century Fox	Visual effects editor
2002	Blade II	Guillermo del Toro	New Line Cinema; Marvel Enterprises	Visual effects editor
2003	Daredevil	Mark Steven Johnson	20th Century Fox; Marvel Enterprises	Visual effects editor
2004	The Day After Tomorrow	Roland Emmerich	20th Century Fox; Centropolis Entertainment; The Mark Gordon Company; Lions Gate Films	Visual effects editor
2005	Fantastic Four	Tim Story	20th Century Fox; Marvel Entertainment	Visual effects editor
