= Marc Weigert =

German film producer

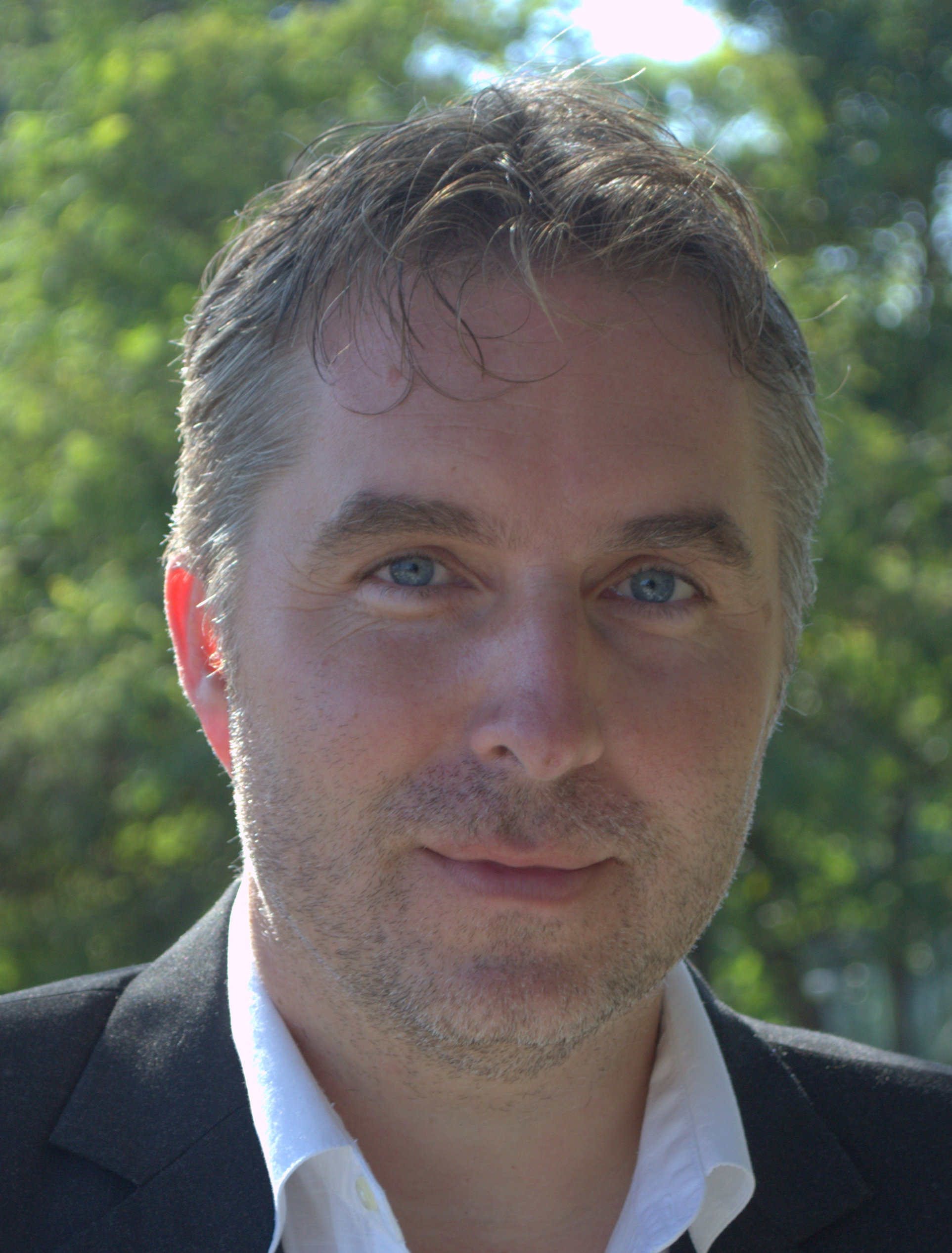
- Born: June 3, 1970 (age 56); Bad Harzburg, Germany
- Occupations: Producer, Visual effects supervisor and 2nd Unit Director

Marc Weigert (born June 3, 1970) is an Emmy-award-winning film producer, film/TV visual effects supervisor and 2nd unit director.

== Early life ==
Weigert was born in Bad Harzburg, Germany. He studied directing and producing from 1991 to 1994 at the Film Academy Baden-Württemberg, where he met Volker Engel who became Weigert's business partner in the production company Uncharted Territory, LLC. Weigert moved to Los Angeles in 1994.

== Career ==
In 1995, Weigert worked as VFX project manager for the film "Independence Day", for which he created "Digital Assistant for Visual Effects", a project management software to manage, schedule and track the filming of VFX elements. The same year he founded he the VFX company Dreamscape Imagery Inc. with his wife Stacey.

In 1999, he founded the production company Uncharted Territory with Volker Engel. The first production, and Weigert's first film as a producer, Coronado, was shot in 2001 in Mexico. In 2003, Weigert co-produced the 2-part mini-series Dark Kingdom: The Dragon King and served as visual effects director together with Volker Engel. In 2005, Weigert wrote the screenplay Southern Skies and produced the 3-part miniseries The Triangle together with Engel and Kelly Van Horn, for executive producers Bryan Singer and Dean Devlin.

In 2006, Weigert won the Emmy Award for The Triangle. He also served as visual effects supervisor commercials for Canon EOS, Kellogg's and Tropicana, and as vfx producer for Cafe FX, working - amongst other projects - on the Hogwarts castle ride film Harry Potter and the forbidden journey for the new Harry Potter Island of Adventure at Universal Studios Florida. With the company Uncharted Territory, he worked on the VFX for the film "The Day After Tomorrow", and the academy award-winning "Hugo".

In 2008, he co-supervised and co-produced Roland Emmerich's "2012" for Sony Pictures. He received the Satellite Award for Best Visual Effects in 2009. In 2010, Weigert was executive producer and VFX supervisor for the film "Anonymous", again for director Roland Emmerich. In 2012/13, Weigert was VFX supervisor, co-producer, and 2nd unit director for Emmerich's "White House Down".

In July 2014, Weigert was named President of Method Studios worldwide. Method Studios is headquartered in Los Angeles, California, and has 9 facilities, including New York, London, Vancouver, Chicago, Detroit, Atlanta, Sydney and Melbourne. He left Method in June 2015.

Immediately afterwards, Weigert joined the production of "Independence Day: Resurgence" as VFX Producer, 20 years after the first Independence Day movie. In the same year, he was voted into the prestigious American Society of Cinematographers (ASC) as associate member. In 2016-2018, he served as co-producer and VFX producer on "The Nutcracker and the four realms" for the Walt Disney Company.
