= Trini Alvarado =

American film and television actress

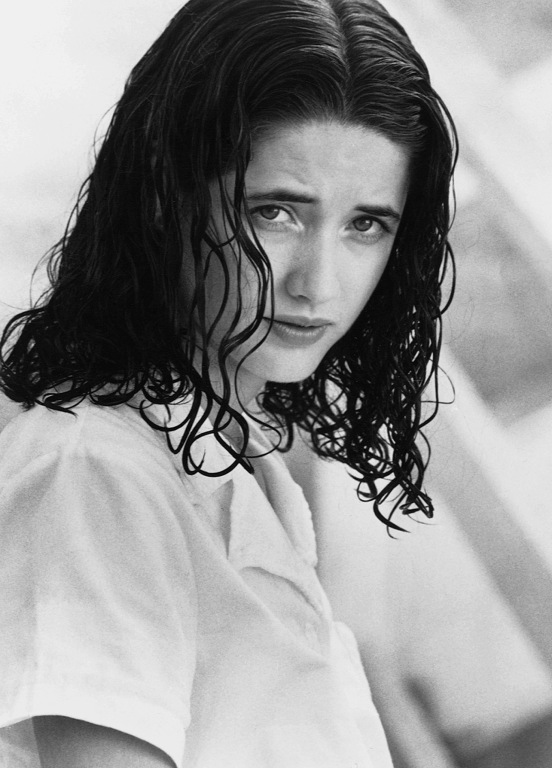
- Alvarado in 1987
- Born: Trinidad Alvarado; January 10, 1967 (age 59); New York City, New York, U.S.
- Education: Fordham University
- Occupation: Actress
- Years active: 1977–present
- Spouse: Robert McNeill

Trinidad "Trini" Alvarado (born January 10, 1967) is an American actress best known for her performances as Margaret "Meg" March in the 1994 film adaptation of Louisa May Alcott's novel Little Women and Lucy Lynskey in the comedy horror film The Frighteners. As a child actress, she had notable singing roles in two musicals, including one that that was staged on Broadway.

== Personal life ==
Alvarado was born in New York City, the daughter of Sylvia, a Puerto Rican flamenco dancer, and Domingo Alvarado, a Spanish-born flamenco singer. As a child, she lived on upper Riverside Drive in Harlem. She attended the Professional Children's School and studied at Fordham University. Alvarado said in an 1990 interview that: "I lead kind of a quiet life. I just grew up that way." Alvarado more or less stays out of the limelight and is a self-described homebody, revealing during the promotion for The Frighteners in 1996: "It's just difficult to go away. I was very nervous about having to go to New Zealand for nearly seven months [to make The Frighteners]. I was very tragically saying goodbye to everybody."

== Career ==
Alvarado made her show business debut at the age of seven when she joined her family's dance troupe, and that led to roles on stage, including the role of Melinda in Elizabeth Swados's Broadway musical Runaways in 1978. Alvarado was featured, along with Karen Evans, on the song "Lullaby From Baby to Baby", denoted by Swados as the "theme song" of the musical. In 1977–78, she appeared in two Unicorn Tales television specials. The next year, she starred in Rich Kids alongside John Lithgow and Jeremy Levy, and she lent her vocals to the ending song "Happy Ida and Broken-Hearted John". The same year, she appeared in the ABC Afterschool Special "A Movie Star's Daughter" as Dena McKain, her first of two appearances in the series (her second was the 1981 special Starstruck).

In 1980, Alvarado appeared in Times Square with Tim Curry and Robin Johnson, in which she and Johnson sang together "Your Daughter Is One."

There followed roles in a string of TV shows and movies before she appeared in Gillian Armstrong's 1984 drama Mrs. Soffel. In 1985, Alvarado played the role of Anne Frank in the off-Broadway musical Yours, Anne. The following year, she starred as the title character in Maggie Magalita, another off-Broadway production.

Her next roles—the young Lisa Titus in the ill-fated 1987 film The Chair, the tough, smart-aleck May "Mooch" Stark in the frank, girl-dominant teen movie Satisfaction—led up to playing the daughter of Stella Claire (portrayed by Bette Midler), in the 1990 film Stella. Midler and Alvarado bonded on set and performed an impromptu duet of the chorus of the Beatles' "If I Fell" during Alvarado's screen test, which led to Alvarado's being cast.

After Stella, Alvarado played the role of Elinor Hartley in American Friends, which Michael Palin both wrote and starred. Alvarado later worked alongside John Goodman on the 1992 biopic The Babe, playing the role of Helen Woodford Ruth.

Alvarado worked with director Gillian Armstrong on the 1994 film adaptation of Little Women. When asked about the role, she said "I am Hispanic and Meg ... is not a Hispanic, but even so they gave me the part. But I understand the situation. I understand it because sometimes I see a film about Hispanics, where none of actors is Hispanic, and I feel bad about that. I'd feel particularly bad if they hadn't allowed me to audition, when they said that they'd already seen all the Hispanics in Hollywood, which isn't true." She and her cast mates endured lessons in Victorian life, including proper etiquette, and restricting dresses. About the women's limiting garb, Alvarado said, "It's so obvious why women were thought of as the weaker sex. I don't know if it was a subconscious desire of designers to hold women back, but you can't even take a full breath [in these dresses]."

Alvarado's next film was 1995's The Perez Family, co-starring Alfred Molina, Anjelica Huston and Marisa Tomei. The next year saw the release of The Frighteners, Peter Jackson's horror/comedy film about a con artist who sees ghosts, and The Christmas Tree, the directorial debut of actress Sally Field. Alvarado is better known for the first, but The Frighteners wasn't hugely successful during its initial release. In the making-of documentary included with the revamped DVD, Alvarado admitted to enduring bruises because of the active, violent scenes in the movie and to being "cursed"; an ice cream truck from a local New Zealand vendor would go by playing "Greensleeves" every time Jackson did a close-up on her and make her break character.

She appeared in the last minutes of Paulie (1998). Other major roles include a supporting part in the critically acclaimed film Little Children in 2006.

She played various roles on TV, appearing alongside Eric Stoltz in 2000's The Last Dance. She played the role of Samantha Loeb in the sci-fi drama Fringe, appearing in two episodes in 2008 and 2009. Alvarado had a role in the films All Good Things, which starred former co-star Kirsten Dunst, and The Good Guy, screened at the Tribeca Film Festival on 26 April 2009.

Alvarado has provided the voice-over for the audio books Trickster's Choice, Trickster's Queen and the series Alanna: Song of the Lioness Quartet, written by Tamora Pierce. Alvarado voiced Debbie Macomber's Changing Habits.

In May 2014, she appeared in the episode "Forget Me" of the series Black Box.

== Filmography ==
Year	Title	Role	Notes
1977	The Magic Pony Ride	Jump Rope Girl (uncredited)	Short film
1978	Big Apple Birthday	Goldilocks	Short film
1979	Rich Kids	Franny Philips	
1979	ABC Afterschool Special	Dena McKain	Episode: "A Movie Star's Daughter"
1980	Times Square	Pamela Pearl	
1981	ABC Afterschool Special	Alicia Marin	Episode: "Starstruck"
1982	American Playhouse	Gail Brock	Episode: "Private Contentment"
1982	Dreams Don't Die	Teresa	TV movie
1983	Jacobo Timerman: Prisoner Without a Name, Cell Without a Number	Lisa Castello	TV movie
1984	Mrs. Soffel	Irene Soffel	
1986	Kate & Allie	Mindy	Episode: "Winning"
1986	Kay O'Brien	Sarah Avery	Episode: "Big Vacation"
1987	Sweet Lorraine	Molly Garber	
1987	Spenser: For Hire	Laurie Kincaid	Episode: "Sleepless Dream"
1988	Satisfaction	Mooch	
1988	Nitti: The Enforcer	Anna	TV movie
1988	The Chair	Lisa Titus	
1990	American Playhouse	Younger Elinor	Episode: "Sensibility and Sense"
1990	Stella	Jenny Claire	
1991	American Friends	Miss Elinor Hartley	
1991	American Blue Note	Lorraine	
1992	The Human Factor		Episode: "Pilot"
1992	The Babe	Helen Woodford Ruth	
1994	Little Women	Meg March	
1995	The Perez Family	Teresa Perez	
1996	The Frighteners	Dr. Lucy Lynskey	
1996	The Christmas Tree	Beth	TV movie
1998	Paulie	Adult Marie Alweather	
2000	The Last Dance	Denise Cope	TV movie
2001	Bitter Winter		TV movie
2004	Law & Order: Special Victims Unit	Maggie Shaye	Episode: "Ritual"
2004	The Jury	Sandra Saramago	Episode: "Three Boys and a Gun"
2006	Little Children	Theresa	
2008	Welcome to the Western Indian Ocean	Director	TV movie
2008-2009	Fringe	Samantha Loeb	Episodes: "In Which We Meet Mr. Jones" / "Bound"
2009	The Good Guy	Sylvia	
2010	All Good Things	Sarah Davis	
2014	Black Box	Beatrice King	Episode: "Forget Me"
2018	Tanya Cookies Magic Storybook	Todd Haydns	Episodes: "Toopy's Story", "Tiger Binoo", "Magic Mirror", "Power Pyjamas"
2022	The Staircase	Patty Peterson	

== See also ==
- List of Puerto Ricans
