= Metegol =

Underdogs
- Argentine theatrical release poster
- Directed by: Juan José Campanella
- Screenplay by: Juan José Campanella; Gastón Gorali; Eduardo Sacheri
- Story by: Eduardo Sacheri; Gastón Gorali; Axel Kuschevatzky; Juan José Campanella
- Based on: "Memoirs of a Right Winger" by Roberto Fontanarrosa
- Produced by: Juan José Campanella; Mercedes Gamero; Gastón Gorali; Mikel Lejarza; Jorge Estrada Mora; Manuel Polanco
- Starring: John Leguizamo; Eugenio Derbez; Ariana Grande; Matthew Morrison; Taran Killam; Nicholas Hoult; Bobby Moynihan; Mel Brooks
- Cinematography: Félix Monti
- Edited by: Juan José Campanella
- Music by: Emilio Kauderer
- Production companies: 100 Bares Producciones; Antena 3 Films; Catmandu Branded Entertainment; JEMPSA; Mundoloco CGI Animation Studios; Prana Studios; Telefe; Canal+
- Distributed by: Universal Pictures International
- Release dates: July 18, 2013 (Argentina); December 20, 2013 (Spain)
- Running time: 106 minutes
- Countries: Argentina; Spain; India
- Language: Spanish
- Budget: $21 million
- Box office: $32.7 million

Metegol (Spanish for table football; also known in English as Underdogs in the United States, The Unbeatables in the United Kingdom and sometimes as Foosball) is a 2013 animated sports comedy film co-written, produced, directed and edited by Juan J. Campanella. The film is loosely based on the short story "Memorias de un wing derecho" ("Memoirs of a Right Winger") by Argentine writer Roberto Fontanarrosa. Gaston Gorali, co-writer and producer of the film, and Eduardo Sacheri (who had previously worked with Campanella for the classic film The Secret in Their Eyes) developed the screenplay with Campanella.

The film is an Argentine-Spanish production, and was released by Universal Pictures International Entertainment in Argentina on 18 July 2013, setting an all-time record for an Argentine film opening at the box-office. Costing $21 million, the film is the most expensive Argentine film of all time, and the most expensive Latin American animated feature ever.

In the United Kingdom, Vertigo Films acquired the distribution rights and 369 Productions produced the first English-language version of the film. It was released in August 2014 under the title The Unbeatables.

The Weinstein Company acquired the rights to distribute the film in North America. After various delays, including an August 2015 theatrical release that was scrapped last minute, the North American English-language version was released on DVD in July 2016. The film was available on Netflix in the United States in June 2016. The film received mixed reviews from critics.

In the American version, the film features the voices of Ariana Grande, Nicholas Hoult, Matthew Morrison, Eugenio Derbez, Taran Killam, Shawn Mendes, Katie Holmes, Brooklyn Beckham, Bobby Moynihan, Bella Thorne, John Leguizamo, and Mel Brooks. Whereas, the UK version features the voices of Rupert Grint, Ralf Little, Anthony Head, Rob Brydon, Peter Serafinowicz and Darren Boyd.

A television show based on the film called Underdogs United was released on March 7, 2022, for the Latin version of Discovery Kids.

== Plot ==
A father who is putting his son to sleep narrates a story, beginning by telling him to use his imagination while listening.

Many years ago, Amadeo, a timid boy and the best table football player around, was working in a bar in a small and quiet town. He loved Laura, a girl he met in the bar, but she did not know. While showing Laura the table football table, a bully named Grosso arrives and challenges Amadeo to a game in front of Laura. Although Amadeo refuses to play at first, he is victorious, and everyone at the bar applauds. Outside of the bar, Grosso encounters a manager who offers to take him on.

Seven years later, Amadeo's simple routine falls apart when Grosso becomes the best football player in the world, and returns to the small town to avenge the only defeat in his life. Now that he is famous, Grosso announces that he has purchased the whole village (as the town's mayor escapes in a helicopter), and builds a gigantic football stadium, although he is more interested in owning the table football table where he lost to Amadeo and destroying the bar where he was defeated. He also wants to win the affection of Laura.

With football, the bar and even his soul destroyed, Amadeo discovers something magical: in the face of adversity, the town's table football players talk and plan. Together they embark on a journey full of adventures to save Laura. Along the way, they become a real team, and while Grosso turns the town into a giant stadium and forms a soccer team, Amadeo recruits members of his table football team along with those of his own, and also forms a soccer team to challenge Grosso for their town.

At the game, Grosso's team takes the early lead, but the table football players help Amadeo's team to tie the game. However, with seconds to go, Grosso deliberately injures Amadeo, who is unable to stop him from scoring the winning goal. As Grosso gloats and celebrates his victory, the crowd instead praises Amadeo's good sportsmanship, and Grosso is rejected by his fans for his selfishness and his manager abandons him while his teammates also congratulate Amadeo, who reunites with Laura in the end. Amadeo, Laura, and their friends build a new town in honor of them.

The father, (revealed to be Amadeo), finishes his story and leaves his son's bedroom, but he remains awake and hears voices well into the night. Going outside to the shed to investigate, he finds Amadeo and the table football players conversing at the table football table. Heartened by this, he joins them.

== Cast ==
Character	Original Spanish dub	UK dub	US dub
Amadeo (Jake Hoffer in the US)	David Masajnik (adult); Natalia Rosminati (young)	Rupert Grint (adult); Darren Boyd (older); Oscar Leonard (young)	Matthew Morrison (adult); Kevin Dillon (Older); Shawn Mendes (young)
Capi (Captain Skip in the UK and US)	Pablo Rago	Ralf Little	Taran Killam
Loco (Ziggy in the US)	Horacio Fontova	Peter Serafinowicz	John Leguizamo
Beto (Rico in the UK and US)	Fabián Gianola	Rob Brydon	Eugenio Derbez
Capitán Liso (Gregor in the UK and Captain Rip in the US)	Miguel Ángel Rodríguez	Alex Norton	Bobby Moynihan
Laura (Lara in the UK)	Lucía Maciel	Eve Ponsonby (adult); Fern Deacon (young)	Ariana Grande (adult); Katie Holmes (older); Bella Thorne (young)
Ezekial "El Grosso" Remancho (Flash in the UK and Ace Remacho in the US)	Diego Ramos (adult); Mariana Otero (young)	Anthony Head (adult); Jack Maison-Hayman (young)	Nicholas Hoult (adult); Brooklyn Beckham (young)
Carmiño (Chester in the UK and Rufus in the US)	Lucila Gómez	David Schneider	Taran Killam
Manager (Agent in the UK and US)	Coco Sily	Stanley Townsend	Mel Brooks
Matías (Matty in the UK and US)	Natalia Rosminati	Zac Lester	Nolan Lyons
Malparitti I (Beville Beville in the UK and Nino Mustachio in the US)	Ezequiel Cipols	Andrew Knott	Bobby Moynihan
Malparitti II (Beville in the UK and Gino Mustachio in the US)	Gabriel Almirón	Andrew Knott	Bobby Moynihan
Coreano (Psy Kick in the UK and Dr. Gregory Chan in the US)	Roberto Kim	Adam Longworth	Bobby Moynihan
El Pulpo (Mac in the UK and Bruno in the US)	Sebastián Mogordoy	Nigel Hastings	Dan McCabe
Lechuga (Jono in the UK and Angry Mike in the US)	Juan José Campanella	?	?
Milton (Stevie in the UK and Rasta-Chris in the US)	Alejandro Piar	Matt Wilkinson	?
Igor (Sawnoffski in the UK)	Igor Samoilov	Lewis MacLeod	?
Cordobés (Adriano in the UK and Jerry Curls in the US)	Federico Cecere	Geronimo Rauch	Dann Fink
Priest (Father Dick Dawkins in the UK and Father Fitzpatrick in the US)	Ernesto Claudio	Jon Glover	Tony Daniels
El Raton (Fast Fingers Flynn in the UK and Freddy Fingers in the US)	?	Simon Purdey	Dann Fink
Ermitaño (The Hermit in the UK and Stinky in the US)	Marcos Mundstock	Adam Longworth	Chazz Palminteri
Subcomisario Bautista Pizano (Officer Robin Banks in the UK and Officer Russell "The Muscle" McVine in the US)	?	Simon Greenall	?
Armando (Spencer in the UK and Cliff Jackson in the US)	Juan José Campanella	Simon Greenall	Bruce Winant
Eusebio (Paul Moxy in the UK and Gordon Reilly in the US)	Juan José Campanella	Lewis MacLeod	?
Aristides (Ray in the UK and CJ in the US)	Jorge Troiani	Alistair McGowan	Jay Pharoah
Tenuta (Bob in the UK and Ted in the US)	Jorge Troiani	Jonathan Pearce	Dan Patrick

=== Additional voices ===
UK Dub

- Nick Angell as Flash's Gang
- Damian Bakris as Flash's Gang
- Malcolm Boyden as Stadium Announcer
- Jon Glover as The Mayor, Thug
- Adam Longworth as The Guv'ner, The Trainer
- Lewis MacLeod as Gill Etter
- Lorraine Pilkington as Flash's Gang
- Simon Purdey as Claret Player
- David Schneider as Fairground Attendant
- Jamie Staveley as Flash's Gang
- Dominic Thomas as Flash's Gang

US Dub

- Greg Abbott
- Matthew Ballard
- Blanca Camacho
- Tony Daniels as The Carnie
- Dan Edelstein
- Steve French
- Anna Garduno
- Elan Garfias
- Jason Griffith as Jerry In The Blimp, Ace's Friend #1
- Nicholas Guest
- Timothy Gulan
- Ashley Lambert
- Selenis Leyva
- Bill Lobley
- Dan McCabe as Ace's Friend #2
- Scott Menville
- Di Quon
- Armando Riesco
- Sandy Rustin
- Piers Stubbs
- Jen Tullock
- Alexis Del Vecchio
- John Walton West
- Bruce Winant as The Mayor
- Sally Winter

== Production ==
The film was announced on 27 November 2009. The voices of the main characters of the cast are Pablo Rago, Miguel Ángel Rodríguez, Fabian Gianola, Horacio Fontova and David Masajnik.

Sergio Pablos, executive producer and creator of the original idea and story for Despicable Me, acted as animation director for 20 minutes of the film, and advised Campanella on direction. The rest of the film was animated under the directions of Federico Radero and Mario Serie.

Puerto Rican band Calle 13 composed and performed the original song of the movie.

Mundoloco CGI in Buenos Aires, Argentina was hired to provide the film's animation, while Prana Studios was hired to provide the film's Lighting, Compositing, Visual Effects, and Rendering while operating in Mumbai, India.

== Release ==
The first English-language version of the film was produced in the United Kingdom by 369 Productions with Vertigo Films handling the distribution rights and was released under the name The Unbeatables on 15 August 2014. The UK dub features stars such as Rupert Grint, Rob Brydon, Anthony Head, Ralf Little, Alistair McGowan, Peter Serafinowicz, and Eve Ponsonby.

In March 2014, The Weinstein Company acquired distribution rights for the film in the United States, Canada, Australia, New Zealand and France, with plans to release their own heavily edited English-language version of the film under the title Underdogs. The US dub features Ariana Grande, Nicholas Hoult, Matthew Morrison, Katie Holmes, John Leguizamo, Eugenio Derbez, Taran Killam, Bobby Moynihan, Chazz Palminteri, and Mel Brooks. The film was originally going to be released on August 27, 2014 but was pushed back several times. One week before a planned August 14, 2015 release, the film was pulled from the schedule, and the theatrical release was scrapped. It was instead released direct-to-video on 19 July 2016.

== Reception ==
=== Critical reception ===
Based on 15 reviews on Rotten Tomatoes, the American version of the film received a positive rating of 67%, with an average rating of 5.64/10. On Metacritic, the film has a rating of 38 out of 100, based on 5 critics, indicating "generally unfavorable reviews".

Conversely, reception to the original Spanish version was far more positive, with review aggregator Todas las Críticas marking an average score of 71 out of 100.

=== Box office ===
The film opened #1 at the Argentine box-office, earning 16,622,178 pesos on its opening weekend, outperforming other animated blockbusters such as Despicable Me 2 and Monsters University.

== See also ==
- Underdogs United
- List of association football films
