= The Triangle (miniseries) =

2005 science fiction television miniseries by Craig R. Baxley

- Promotional poster for The Triangle.
- Screenplay by: Rockne S. O'Bannon
- Story by: Rockne S. O'Bannon; Bryan Singer; Dean Devlin
- Directed by: Craig R. Baxley
- Starring: Eric Stoltz; Catherine Bell; Lou Diamond Phillips; Bruce Davison; Michael Rodgers; Lisa Brenner; John Sloan; Barrie Ingham; Charles Martin Smith; Sam Neill
- Composer: Joseph LoDuca
- Countries of origin: United States; United Kingdom; Germany
- Original language: English
- No. of episodes: 3

Production
- Executive producers: Rockne S. O'Bannon; Bryan Singer; Dean Devlin
- Producers: Volker Engel; Marc Weigert; Kelly Van Horn
- Cinematography: David Connell
- Editor: Sonny Baskin
- Running time: 254 minutes
- Production companies: Electric Entertainment; Bad Hat Harry Productions; BBC; Uncharted Territory

Original release
- Network: Sci-Fi Channel
- Release: December 5 – December 7, 2005

The Triangle is a three-part US-British science fiction television miniseries concerning the Bermuda Triangle, which first aired on Sci-Fi Channel in the US December 5–7, 2005. It was written by Dean Devlin, Bryan Singer and Rockne S. O'Bannon, directed by Craig R. Baxley, and produced by special effects experts Volker Engel and Marc Weigert, together with Kelly Van Horn, for Devlin's and Singer's production companies Electric Entertainment and Bad Hat Harry Productions, the BBC, and Engel's and Weigert's production company Uncharted Territory.

== Plot ==
A shipping company employs a team of four people (a journalist, a psychic, a meteorologist, and an oceanographer) to discover the secret of the Bermuda Triangle. With the help of a Greenpeace survivor and a tycoon they ultimately find out the truth about a high-tech underwater facility operated by the United States Navy and its relation to the Philadelphia Experiment, determining that the Triangle is a wormhole. They close the Triangle, destroying it forever, but their efforts at closing the wormhole also disrupt time and cause the Triangle never to have existed in the first place, with everyone who was taken being returned and living out their lives as though nothing had ever happened. In the new Triangle-less timeline the only ones who know the Bermuda Triangle ever existed are the team members who destroyed it.

== Cast ==
Sam Neill as Eric Benirall
Shipping tycoon Eric Benirall has lost numerous ships in the Bermuda Triangle. Benirall is the architect of an historic expedition. He brings together a team of disparate experts by making them an offer they can't refuse – US$5 million each to solve the mystery of the Triangle – but his intentions might not be all that they appear. At first it seems that his goal is purely monetary gain, but Stan (the psychic) eventually figures out the truth after seeing a man that looks just like Eric but with darker hair and a mustache in his reflection in a window with him. He has a twin brother named Winston who was taken by the Triangle during one of their ships voyages. Eric is desperate to get his brother back. In the first timeline he leads them to the Secretary of the Navy who is apparently a friend of his and the Secretary reveals what is believed to be the truth to them. In the second timeline when Howard traveled back in time several hours with the knowledge of the truth, he kicks them out when Winston is mentioned. Ultimately, he comes to his senses and leads a methane tanker out into the middle of the Triangle to stop the Navy. His efforts buy the others the time they need and the Triangle is destroyed. In the new timeline, he, along with the others, remembers what happened as he sends everyone the $5 million he promised. In the new timeline, he never lost his brother and they run their shipping empire together.
Eric Stoltz as Howard Gregory Thomas
Howard Thomas is a reporter for a supermarket tabloid and an "expert" on the Bermuda Triangle. He is a hardcore cynic and a walking encyclopedia of fringe knowledge. Howard is recruited by Benirall to be the team's "ultimate arbiter", applying his experience with debunking the "paranormal" as a Litmus Test for the rest of the team's theories. With a young daughter and an ex-wife (Shannon Esra) to whom he can barely afford to pay alimony, his personal life might be in even worse shape than his career. He is somewhat the true hero of the story because when he notices all is lost, he purposely follows Stan into the triangle and ends up in the past to change things. His efforts allow them to get where they need to be faster and the Triangle is destroyed. In the new timeline, he is still with his wife but they're having marital problems and are probably headed for a divorce. This time he decides to work it out with her and presumably succeeds.
Bruce Davison as Stan Lathem
Stan Lathem is a man with genuine psychic abilities, but he has been reduced to hawking self-promotional tapes at New Age fairs to make a living. Low-key but deeply emotional, Stan is attuned to an entire invisible world filled with clues to the Triangle's origins. His intuition complements the rest of the team's literal and scientific approaches to discovery. In the first timeline he survives a Triangle effect in which a bridge that he, Howard, and a scientist are crossing is erased from existence; but in the second timeline, when he (by mistake) and Howard (on purpose) are transported back to that point, he dies as Howard tries to save the scientist first and doesn't get to him in time. He is revived in the new timeline when the Triangle is destroyed.
Michael E. Rodgers as Bruce Geller
Australian native Bruce Geller is a thrill-seeking (and often reckless) professor of meteorology who often reveals his questionable moral fiber. Initially, he joins Benirall's team purely for the money, and he starts by looking for the fastest and easiest way to collect the $5 million payoff. He has a childlike enthusiasm for discovery, however, and his passion for the task at hand soon reveals itself. He is the one that ultimately discovers the truth about the Triangle and, after it is destroyed, ends up in a timeline where he has an injured leg, but is happily married with two small children. The injury to his leg was the result of a bad stunt, even though the same stunt had worked in the previous timeline.
Catherine Bell as Emily Myredith Patterson
Deep ocean resource engineer Emily Patterson has recently been fired from an off-shore drilling company for not backing off from safety concerns that would have shut down their operations. She is a brilliant woman with strong convictions but, despite her multiple degrees and expert knowledge of oceanography (among other subjects), it is financial need that drives her to accept Benirall's far-fetched proposal. She keeps encountering her birth mother while jumping between timelines. In one jump when they sit down to dinner together, Emily asks her mother why she would give her up for adoption when she was one week old. Her mother confessed she had almost given her up because she was alone and worried she couldn't provide for a baby but, ultimately, she couldn't bring herself to do it. Emily learns her mother's name through the vision and calls her once everything is over, but her mother does not know her. It is also shown in the new timeline where she has a boyfriend as well.
Lou Diamond Phillips as Meeno Paloma
Meeno Paloma is a sailor, the sole survivor of a Triangle event that killed the crews of a Japanese whaling ship and a Greenpeace raft. He returns from his ordeal to a loving family, but one that is not quite as he remembers it. Confronted with a son he doesn't know and smaller details that aren't as they should be, Meeno is increasingly tormented by the possibility that either his memory has been damaged... or that he has somehow rejoined a world in which he doesn't belong. He seems to keep switching between two timelines: one where he has one son and one where he has two. Ultimately, he goes to Howard for help and joins the group's efforts to stop the U.S. Navy from accidentally creating the Triangle. He suggests they do things the “Greenpeace way"; he wants to drive his cigarette boat out to where the Navy is attempting to close the Triangle without realizing they are actually creating it. The first attempt fails and the Triangle is created but the second time around, Howard gathers him and everyone sooner and they make it to the Naval Base although Meeno's boat is destroyed by the Navy and they are captured. The attempt works and in the new timeline created from the Triangle's destruction. When he awakens from the new timeline, he is overjoyed to see that the new timeline kept his younger son.

== Reception ==
=== Accolades ===
The Triangle won the Primetime Emmy Award for Outstanding Special Visual Effects and the Saturn Award for Best Television Presentation.
