= Chandralekha Singh =

Indian-American physicist

Dr. Chandralekha Singh
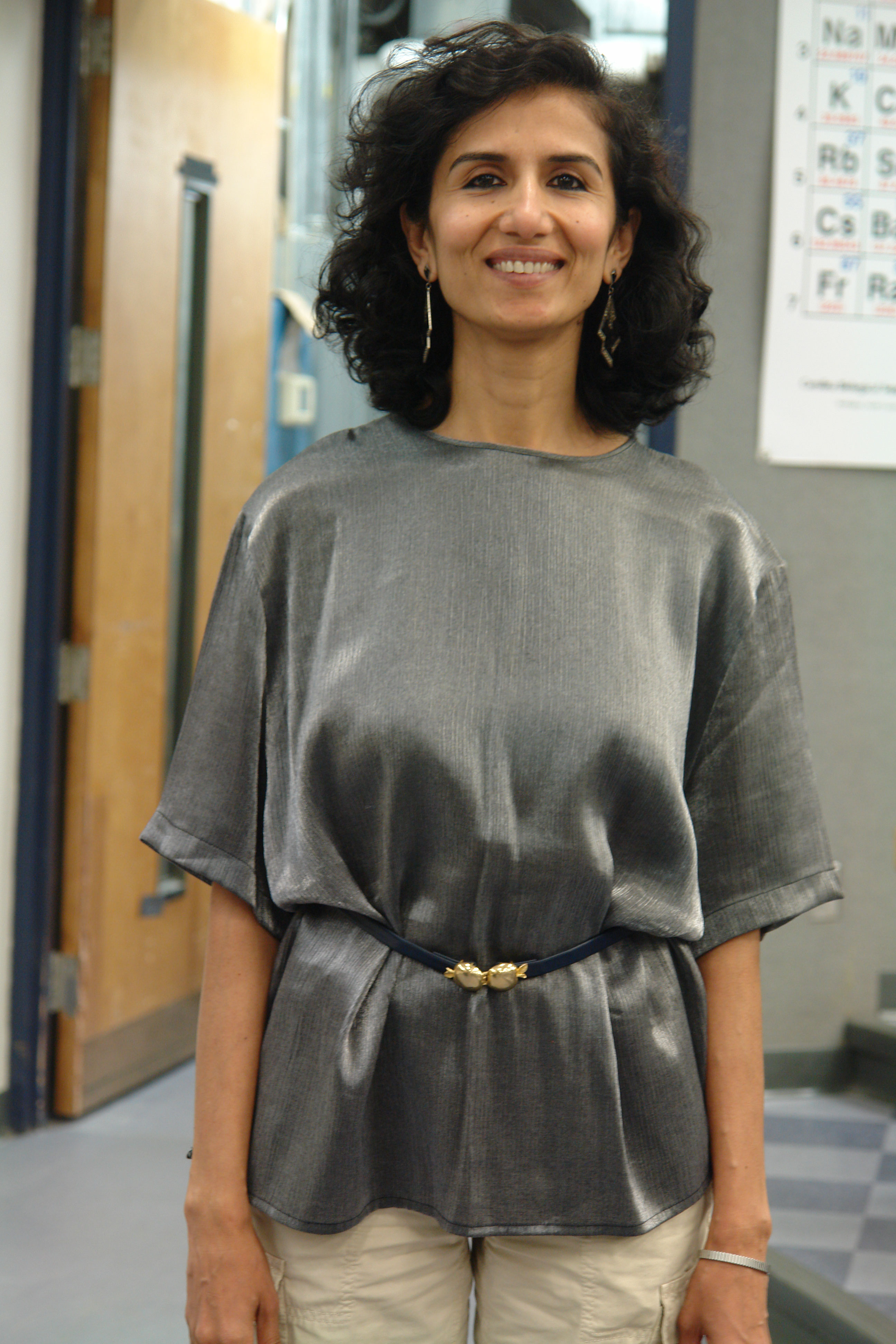
- Singh at the University of Pittsburgh (2007)
- Education: University of California Santa Barbara (MA, Ph.D); Indian Institute of Technology (IIT), Kharagpur, India (BS, MS)
- Spouse: Jeremy Levy (m. 1990)
- Children: 2
- Website: Chandralekha Singh on Google Sites Chandralekha Singh's Google Scholar profile

Chandralekha Singh is an Indian-American physicist who is a professor in the Department of Physics and Astronomy at the University of Pittsburgh and the Founding Director of the Discipline-Based Science Education Research Center.

== Education, research, and other professional activities ==
Singh obtained her BS and MS degrees (5 year integrated MSc.) in physics from the Indian Institute of Technology (IIT), Kharagpur, India, in 1986 and 1988, respectively. She was at the top of her physics class at both the bachelor and masters level (five year integrated course) at IIT Kharagpur. She obtained her M.A. and Ph.D. in Physics from the University of California Santa Barbara in 1993 conducting research in condensed matter theory. After her Ph.D., she was a postdoctoral Fellow at the University of Illinois Urbana-Champaign before moving to the University of Pittsburgh in 1995.

=== Areas of research ===
After moving to the University of Pittsburgh, Singh gradually transitioned to physics education research and has been conducting cutting-edge research to improve the learning of physics at all levels. She has pioneered research to improve learning of advanced physics and has conducted seminal research on improving student understanding of quantum mechanics. She has also been a leading researcher focusing on research on assessment of learning in the context of physics and in improving student learning in physics courses at all levels. She has played a key role in research on the role of intuition and expertise in physics problem solving, which can be translated to improving students’ problem solving, reasoning and meta-cognitive skills. Her research includes both theoretical and empirical research to make students good problem solvers and independent learners. Singh’s research elucidates cognitive issues in learning physics, identifies sources of student difficulties in learning physics at both the introductory and advanced levels, and can be translated into the design and assessment of research-validated novel pedagogies that may significantly reduce these difficulties.

=== Other areas of research ===
In the past, Singh has conducted the following types of research in theoretical physics:

- The effect of quenched disorder on the nonlinear optical properties of conducting polymers.
- The electronic and conformational properties of conducting polymers in solution including the electronic energy gap, the density of states, the localization properties of the electronic states, the persistence and conjugation lengths, the optical absorption, and the distribution of bond angles and lengths using analytical methods and Monte Carlo simulations.
- The role of fluctuations in self organizing critical systems using a singular diffusion approach.
- The equilibrium thermodynamic properties of Diblock copolymers using the Landau-Ginzburg theory.
- The range of validity of the asymptotic forms of correlation functions and susceptibilities in one dimensional Hubbard model and the cross-over as a function of temperature, between the half-filled and non-half-filled behavior at low doping, using quantum Monte Carlo simulations.
- Ion transport and selectivity of ions in the transmembrane ion channels using Molecular Dynamics simulations.
- The phase behavior and thermodynamic properties of the polymer mixtures including the self-consistent determination of the chain conformation.
- Pattern formation in thin polymeric films, adsorption of polymers at patterned surfaces, and formation of ion-channels in lipid membranes using self-consistent field theory.

Singh’s Master’s project at IIT Kharagpur, India, involved preparing co-precipitated samples of superconducting YBCO and characterizing them using resistance measurements and scanning electron microscope measurements.

=== Other professional activities ===
Upon request from another alumnus from IIT, Singh recorded 130 half-hour lectures for the Topper Learning Channel. The physics lectures for 11th grade and 12th grade physics in India that she recorded focus on the Indian Central Board of Secondary Education (CBSE) curriculum, which is equivalent to college introductory calculus-based physics curriculum in the US. These lectures provide an extremely low cost alternative to expensive tutoring that many Indian parents cannot afford.

These video lectures incorporate research in physics education and help students with the difficulties they commonly have in learning various topics in physics and they also include research-based learning tools to engage students in the learning process. The videos start with a teaser which includes a real world application of physics. The teasers in the video lectures involve a concrete application of physics relevant for the topic of the lecture (e.g., in one teaser, Singh would be biking fast and the bike would be stable but when she would slow down, the bike would wobble and she would ask students why the bike was less stable when she slowed down and then invite them to join her in the interactive video lecture which would help them learn about it). The rest of the video lecture takes advantage of physics demonstrations and visualization tools to help students learn. All videos end with the line “And remember, it’s your universe…know the rules!”

Singh held the chair-line of the American Physical Society Forum on Education from 2009-2013 and was the Chair of the Editorial board of Physical Review Special Topics Physics Education Research (PR-STPER) from 2010-2013. She chaired the second conference on graduate education in physics in 2013 and was the co-organizer of the first conference on graduate education in physics in 2008. She has co-organized two physics education research conferences in 2006 and 2007 and was the co-chair of the 2010 Gordon Conference on Physics Research and Education. She co-chaired the first conference which brought together physicists, chemists and engineers from various engineering departments to discuss the future of materials science and engineering education in 2008. She served as president of the American Association of Physics Teachers in 2021. Singh is passionate about increasing the participation of women and other underrepresented groups in physics at all levels and has conducted several workshops on related issues.

== Personal life ==
Chandralekha Singh is married to Jeremy Levy who is also a physicist and a Distinguished Professor in the Department of Physics and Astronomy at the University of Pittsburgh. They were classmates in the Ph.D. program at the University of California Santa Barbara. They have two sons, Akash Levy and Ishan Levy.

== Selected awards ==
- J D Jackson Excellence in Graduate Physics Education Awardee, American Association of Physics Teachers (AAPT), 2024.
- Fellow, AAPT, 2014.
- Distinguished Service Citation, AAPT, 2012.
- Fellow, American Physical Society, 2011.
- Chancellor's Distinguished Teaching Award, University of Pittsburgh, PA, 2002.
- School of Arts and Sciences Bellet Teaching Excellence Award, University of Pittsburgh, PA, 2000.
- The Ferrando Fithian Award in Physics, University of California Santa Barbara, CA, 1990.
- Medal, Indian Institute of Technology, Kharagpur, India, 1988 for obtaining first place in physics.
- The National Talent Search Scholarship, NCERT, India, June 1983-June 1988 (the scholarship spanned the entire college education in India).
