= 2012 (film) =

2009 film by Roland Emmerich

- Theatrical release poster
- Directed by: Roland Emmerich
- Written by: Roland Emmerich; Harald Kloser
- Produced by: Harald Kloser; Mark Gordon; Larry Franco
- Starring: John Cusack; Chiwetel Ejiofor; Amanda Peet; Oliver Platt; Thandiwe Newton (Note: Credited as "Thandie Newton"); Danny Glover; Woody Harrelson
- Cinematography: Dean Semler
- Edited by: David Brenner; Peter S. Elliot
- Music by: Harald Kloser; Thomas Wander
- Production companies: Columbia Pictures; Centropolis Entertainment
- Distributed by: Sony Pictures Releasing
- Release date: November 13, 2009
- Running time: 158 minutes
- Country: United States
- Language: English
- Budget: $200 million
- Box office: $791.2 million

2012 is a 2009 American disaster film directed by Roland Emmerich, written by Emmerich and Harald Kloser, and starring John Cusack, Chiwetel Ejiofor, Amanda Peet, Oliver Platt, Thandiwe Newton, Danny Glover, and Woody Harrelson. Based on the 2012 phenomenon, its plot follows numerous characters, including novelist Jackson Curtis (Cusack) and geologist Adrian Helmsley (Ejiofor), as they struggle to survive an eschatological sequence of events including earthquakes, volcanic eruptions, and megatsunamis.

Filming began in Vancouver in August 2008 and wrapped two months later. An extensive marketing campaign was launched for the film, which included the creation of a website from its main characters' point of view, and a viral marketing website on which filmgoers could register for a lottery number to save them from the ensuing disaster.

2012 was released in the United States by Sony Pictures Releasing on November 13, 2009. Despite mixed reviews, the film was a commercial success, grossing $791.2 million worldwide against a production budget of $200 million, becoming the fifth highest-grossing film of 2009. The film was nominated for Best Action, Adventure, or Thriller Film and Best Special Effects at the 36th Saturn Awards, and for Best Visual Effects at the 15th Critics' Choice Awards.

== Plot ==
In 2009, American geologist Adrian Helmsley visits astrophysicist Satnam Tsurutani in Jharkhand, India, and learns that a previously undiscovered type of neutrino from a solar flare is heating the Earth's core. Returning to Washington, D.C., Adrian alerts White House Chief of Staff Carl Anheuser and President Thomas Wilson. A year later, over forty-six nations led by the G8 and China begin building nine arks in Tibet, while storing cultural artifacts aboard them. Nima, a Buddhist monk, is evacuated with his grandparents, while his brother Tenzin joins the ark project. Additional funding is secretly raised by selling tickets to the rich for €1 billion per person.

In 2012, struggling science-fiction writer Jackson Curtis is a chauffeur in Los Angeles for Russian billionaire Yuri Karpov. Jackson's former wife, Kate and their children, Noah and Lilly, live with Kate's boyfriend, plastic surgeon Gordon Silberman. Jackson takes Noah and Lilly camping at Yellowstone National Park. When they find Yellowstone Lake dried up and fenced off by the United States Army, they are caught and brought to Adrian. They later meet conspiracy theorist and radio personality Charlie Frost, who tells Jackson of Charles Hapgood's earth crust displacement theory and how the Mesoamerican Long Count calendar predicts the end of the world in 2012, and that the world's governments silence anyone attempting to warn the public.

Despite his initial skepticism, Jackson begins to take Charlie's warning seriously after witnessing several signs that seem to confirm it. These include a conversation with Yuri's sons, Alec and Oleg, who warn of impending disaster after Jackson drops them off at Santa Monica Airport. He rents a Cessna 340A and sets out to rescue his family. As the Pacific Coast suffers a catastrophic 10.9-magnitude earthquake along the San Andreas Fault, Jackson and his family reach the airport and escape aboard the Cessna before the coast sinks into the Pacific Ocean. The group flies to Yellowstone, and Jackson retrieves Charlie's map of the Arks' location, just as the Yellowstone Caldera begins to erupt. Charlie stays behind to finish his broadcast and is killed by debris. Realizing they need a larger plane to fly to the Himalayas, the group lands at McCarran International Airport in Las Vegas to locate one.

Adrian, Carl, and First Daughter Laura fly to the arks while President Wilson remains in the White House to address the nation. Jackson finds the Karpovs, Yuri's girlfriend Tamara, and their pilot, Sasha. Sasha and Gordon fly the families out in Yuri's Antonov An-500, as the volcanic ash from Yellowstone envelops Las Vegas. The planet's crust shifts, resulting in billions of deaths in disasters worldwide, including President Wilson. With the presidential line of succession broken, Carl appoints himself acting commander-in-chief.

Upon reaching the Himalayas, the Antonov runs out of fuel. As the plane touches down on a glacier, the party uses a Bentley Flying Spur stored in the hold to escape, while Sasha stays in the cockpit and is killed when the jet goes over a cliff. The survivors are spotted by People's Armed Police helicopters bringing animals to the Arks, which take only the three ticket-bearing Karpovs, and Yuri reveals his knowledge of Tamara and Sasha's affair, leaving Jackson's family and her behind. The group encounters Nima, who, with his own family, takes them to the arks, where they stow away on Ark 4 with Tenzin's help.

With a megatsunami approaching, Carl orders the loading gates closed, though many people have not yet boarded. Adrian persuades the captain and the other surviving world leaders to allow more passengers aboard the arks, while Yuri falls to his death as he pushes his sons onto Ark 4. As the gate closes, Tenzin is injured and Gordon is fatally crushed. Tenzin's impact driver lodges in the gate mechanism, preventing it from closing completely and disabling the ship's engines. As the tsunami strikes, the ark starts flooding as it is set adrift, heading for Mount Everest. Adrian rushes to clear the gears, but watertight doors close, trapping the stowaways and drowning Tamara. Noah and Jackson dislodge the tool, and the crew regains control of the ark.

Twenty-seven days later, the waters start receding. The arks approach the Cape of Good Hope, where the Drakensberg Mountains are now the highest mountain range on Earth. Adrian and Laura begin a relationship, while Jackson and Kate reconcile.

== Cast ==
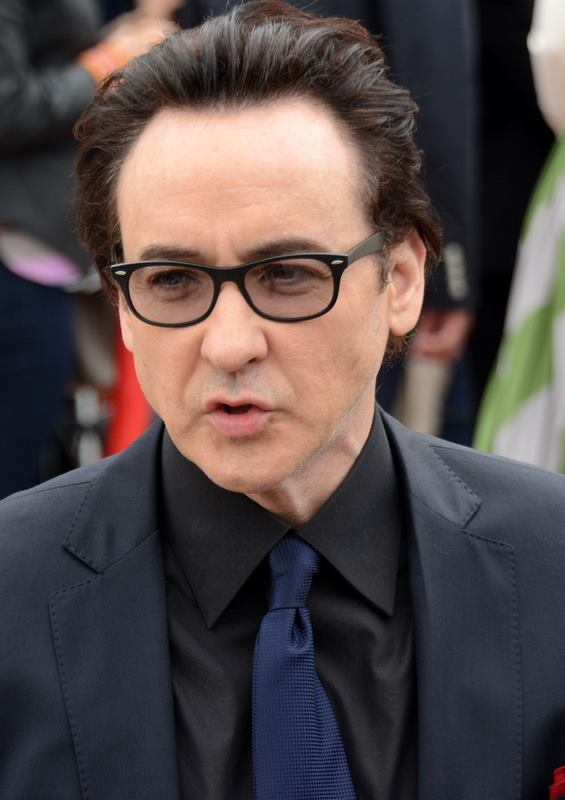
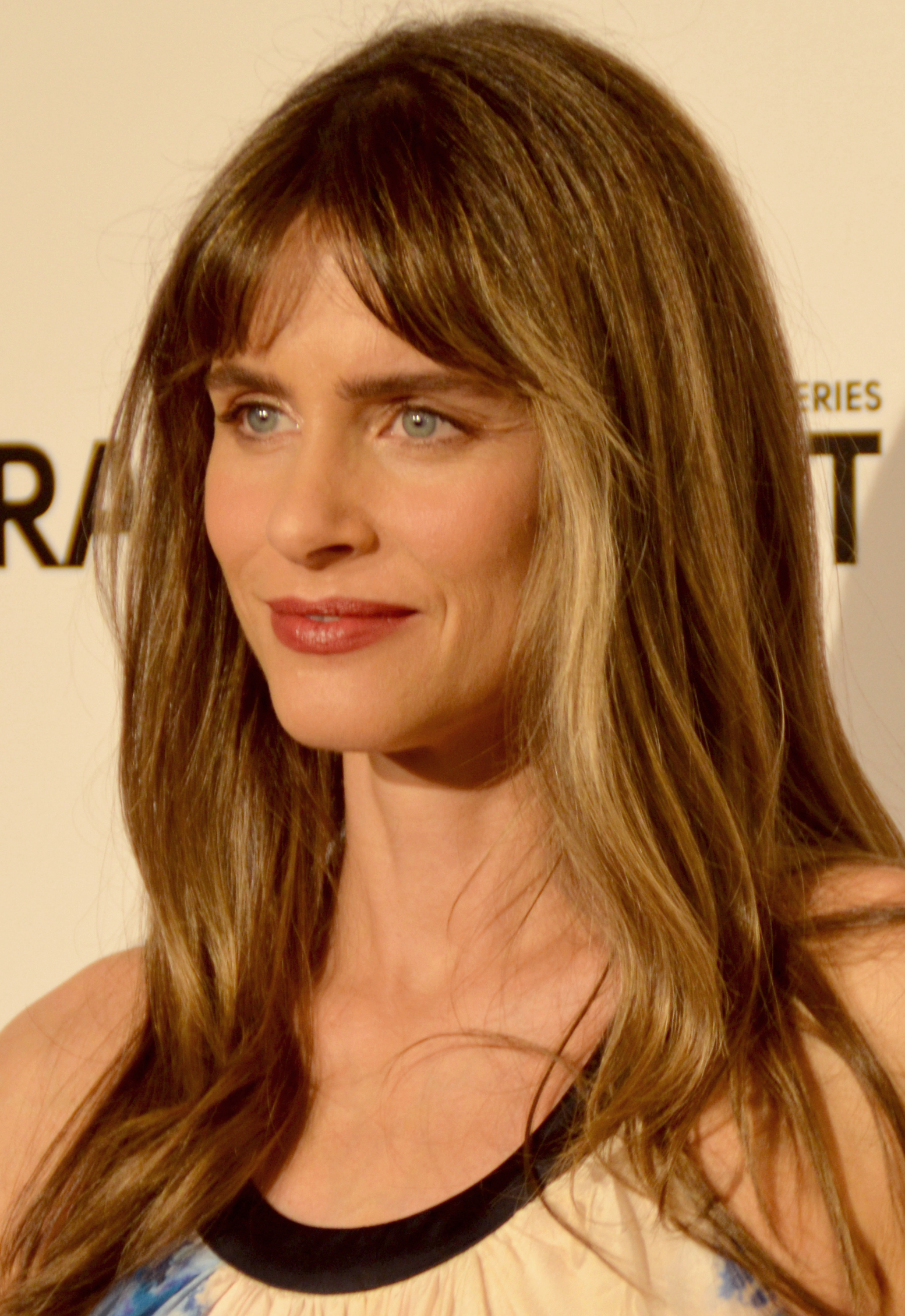
John Cusack (left) and Amanda Peet (right), who play lead roles in the film
- John Cusack as Jackson Curtis, a struggling writer and a father of two children.
- Chiwetel Ejiofor as geologist Adrian Helmsley, chief science advisor to the U.S. President.
- Amanda Peet as Kate Curtis, a medical student and Jackson's former wife.
- Oliver Platt as Carl Anheuser, the White House Chief of Staff.
- Thandiwe Newton (credited as Thandie Newton) as Laura Wilson, an art expert and First Daughter and Adrian's love interest.
- Tom McCarthy as Gordon Silberman, a plastic surgeon/pilot and Kate's boyfriend.
- George Segal as Tony Delgatto, a jazz singer.
- Danny Glover as Thomas Wilson, the President of the United States and Laura's father.
- Woody Harrelson as Charlie Frost, a fringe science conspiracy theorist and radio talk-show host.
- Liam James as Noah Curtis, Jackson and Kate's son.
- Morgan Lily as Lilly Curtis, Jackson and Kate's daughter.
- Blu Mankuma as Harry Helmsley, Adrian's father and Tony Delgatto's vocal partner.
- Zlatko Burić as Yuri Karpov, a Russian billionaire and former boxer.
- Beatrice Rosen as Tamara Jikan, Yuri's girlfriend.
- John Billingsley as Frederick West, a colleague of Adrian.
- Chin Han as Tenzin, an ark worker who attempts to save his family.
- Osric Chau as Nima, a Buddhist monk and Tenzin's younger brother.
- Alexandre Haussmann and Philippe Haussmann as Alec and Oleg Karpov, Yuri's twin sons.
- Jimi Mistry as Satnam Tsurutani, an Indian astrophysicist who discovers the neutrinos which are warming Earth's crust.
- Johann Urb as Sasha, Yuri's pilot.
- Ryan McDonald as Scotty, Adrian and Frederick's assistant.
- Stephen McHattie as Captain Michaels, the captain of Ark 4.
- Lisa Lu as Grandmother Sonam, Tenzin & Nima's grandmother.
- Henry O as Lama Rinpoche, a Buddhist monk.
- Patrick Bauchau as Roland Picard, the director of the Louvre who is killed with a car bomb by the U.S. government.
- Chang Tseng as Grandfather Sonam, Tenzin & Nima's grandfather.
- Karin Konoval as Sally, President Wilson's secretary.
- Agam Darshi as Aparna Tsurutani, Satnam's wife.
- Michael Buffer as himself, announcing for a boxing match in Las Vegas.
- Dean Marshall as the Ark 4 communications officer.
- Zinaid Memišević as Sergey Makarenko, the President of Russia.
- Merrilyn Gann as the Chancellor of Germany.
- Lyndall Grant as Arnold Schwarzenegger, the Governor of California.
- Vincent Cheng as a Chinese colonel.
- Leonard Tenisci as the Prime Minister of Italy.
- Parm Soor as the Saudi Arabian Prince who helps to pay for the construction of the Arks.
- Elizabeth Richard as Queen Elizabeth II.
- Frank C. Turner as Preacher.

== Production ==
=== Development ===
Graham Hancock's Fingerprints of the Gods was listed in 2012's credits as the film's inspiration, and Emmerich said in a Time Out interview: "I always wanted to do a biblical flood movie, but I never felt I had the hook. I first read about the Earth's crust displacement theory in Graham Hancock's Fingerprints of the Gods." He and composer-producer Harald Kloser worked closely together, co-writing the spec script which was marketed to studios in February 2008. A number of studios heard budget projection and story plans from Emmerich and his representatives, a process the director had previously undertaken for Independence Day (1996) and The Day After Tomorrow (2004).

Later that month, Sony Pictures Entertainment obtained the rights to the spec script, set to be distributed under their Columbia Pictures label. According to Emmerich, 2012 was produced for about $200 million.

=== Filming ===
Filming, originally scheduled to begin in Los Angeles in July 2008, commenced in Kamloops, Savona, Cache Creek, and Ashcroft, British Columbia, in early August 2008 and wrapped in mid-October. With the possibility of a Screen Actors Guild strike looming in the wake of the 2007–08 Writers Guild of America strike, the film's producers drew up a contingency plan in case of a walkout by actors. Uncharted Territory, Digital Domain, Double Negative, Scanline, and Sony Pictures Imageworks were hired to create the film's visual effects.

The film depicts the destruction of several cultural and historical landmarks around the world like Christ the Redeemer and the Vatican. Emmerich said that the Kaaba was considered for selection, but Kloser was concerned about a possible fatwa against him.

== Soundtrack ==
The film's score was composed by Kloser and Thomas Wander. Adam Lambert contributed a song to the film, "Time for Miracles", which was written by Alain Johannes and Natasha Shneider. The 24-song soundtrack includes "Fades Like a Photograph" by Filter and "It Ain't the End of the World" by George Segal and Blu Mankuma. "Master of Shadows" by Two Steps from Hell was used for the film's trailers.

== Release ==
=== Marketing ===
2012 was marketed through the fictional Institute for Human Continuity, at a viral marketing website that was created by the movie studio. The website featured main-character Jackson Curtis's book Farewell Atlantis, streaming media, blog updates, and radio broadcasts from zealot Charlie Frost on his website, This Is the End. On November 12, 2008, the studio released the first trailer for 2012, which ended with a suggestion to viewers to "find out the truth" by entering "2012" on a search engine. The Guardian called the film's marketing "deeply flawed", associating it with "websites that make even more spurious claims about 2012".

At the website, filmgoers could register for a lottery number to be part of a small population that would be rescued from the global destruction. David Morrison of NASA, who had received over 1,000 inquiries from people who thought the website was genuine, condemned it. "I've even had cases of teenagers writing to me saying they are contemplating suicide because they don't want to see the world end", Morrison said. "I think when you lie on the internet and scare children to make a buck, that is ethically wrong." Another marketing website promoted Farewell Atlantis.

Comcast organized a "roadblock campaign" to promote the film in which a two-minute scene was broadcast on 450 American commercial television networks, local English-language and Spanish-language stations, and 89 cable outlets during a ten-minute window between 10:50 and 11:00 pm Eastern and Pacific Time on October 1, 2009. The scene featured the destruction of Los Angeles and ended with a cliffhanger, with the entire 5:38 clip available on Comcast's Fancast website. According to Variety, "The stunt will put the footage in front of 90% of all households watching ad-supported TV, or nearly 110 million viewers. When combined with online and mobile streams, that could increase to more than 140 million".

=== Theatrical ===
2012 was released to cinemas on November 13, 2009, in Indonesia, Mexico, Sweden, Canada, Denmark, China, India, Italy, the Philippines, Turkey, the United States, and Japan. According to Sony Pictures, the film could have been completed for a summer release, but a delay allowed more time for production.

=== Home media ===
The DVD and Blu-ray versions were released on March 2, 2010. The two-disc Blu-ray edition includes over 90 minutes of features, including Adam Lambert's music video for "Time for Miracles" and a digital copy for PSP, PC, Mac, and iPod. A 3D version was released in Cinemex theaters in Mexico in February 2010. It was later released on Ultra HD Blu-ray on January 19, 2021.

=== Alternate ending ===
An alternate ending appears in the film's DVD release. After Ark 4's Captain Michaels announces that they are heading for the Cape of Good Hope, Adrian learns by phone that his father, Harry, and Harry's friend Tony Delgatto, survived a megatsunami that capsized their cruise ship Genesis. Adrian and Laura strike up a friendship with the Curtis family, Kate thanks Laura for taking care of Lilly, Laura tells Jackson that she enjoyed his book Farewell Atlantis, and Jackson and Adrian have a conversation reflecting on the events of the worldwide crisis. Carl apologizes to Adrian and Laura for his negligent actions. Jackson returns Noah's cell phone, which he recovered during the Ark 4 flood. Finally, the ark finds the shipwrecked Genesis and its survivors on a beach.

== Reception ==
=== Box office ===
2012 grossed $166.1 million in North America and $625.1 million in other territories for a worldwide total of $791.2 million against a production budget of $200 million, making it the first film to gross over $700 million worldwide without making $200 million domestically. Worldwide, it was the fifth-highest-grossing 2009 film and the fifth-highest-grossing film distributed by Sony-Columbia, (behind Sam Raimi's Spider-Man trilogy and Skyfall). 2012 is the second-highest-grossing film directed by Roland Emmerich, behind Independence Day (1996). It earned $230.5 million on its worldwide opening weekend, the fourth-largest opening of 2009 and for Sony-Columbia.

2012 ranked number one on its opening weekend, grossing $65,237,614 on its first weekend (the fourth-largest opening for a disaster film). Outside North America it is the 28th-highest-grossing film, the fourth-highest-grossing 2009 film, and the second-highest-grossing film distributed by Sony-Columbia, after Skyfall. 2012 earned $165.2 million on its opening weekend, the 20th-largest overseas opening. In total earnings, the film's three highest-grossing territories after North America were China ($68.7 million), France and the Maghreb ($44.0 million), and Japan ($42.6 million).

In 2020, the film received renewed interest during the COVID-19 pandemic, becoming the second-most popular film and seventh-most popular overall title on Netflix in March 2020.

=== Critical response ===
On Rotten Tomatoes, the film has an approval percentage of 40% based on 242 reviews, with the critics consensus reading: "Roland Emmerich's 2012 provides plenty of visual thrills, but lacks a strong enough script to support its massive scope and inflated length." On Metacritic, the film has a score of 49 out of 100 based on 34 critic reviews, meaning "Mixed or Average". Audiences polled by CinemaScore gave the film an average grade of "B+" on an A+ to F scale.

Roger Ebert praised 2012, giving it 3 1/2 stars out of 4 and saying that it "delivers what it promises and since no sentient being will buy a ticket expecting anything else, it will be, for its audiences, one of the most satisfactory films of the year". Ebert and Claudia Puig of USA Today called the film the "mother of all disaster movies". Dan Kois of The Washington Post gave the film 4 out of 4 stars, deeming it "the crowning achievement in Emmerich's long, profitable career as a destroyer of worlds." Jim Schembri of The Age gave the film 4 out of 5 stars, describing it as "a great, big, fat, stupid, greasy cheeseburger of a movie designed to show, in vivid detail, what the end of human civilisation will look like according to his vast army of brilliant visual effects artists."

Peter Travers of Rolling Stone compared the film to Transformers: Revenge of the Fallen, writing: "Beware 2012, which works the dubious miracle of almost matching Transformers 2 for sheer, cynical, mind-numbing, time-wasting, money-draining, soul-sucking stupidity." Rick Groen of The Globe and Mail gave the film 1 out of 4 stars, writing: "As always in Emmerich's rollicking Armageddons, the cannon speaks with an expensive bang, while the fodder gets afforded nary a whimper." Christopher Orr of The New Republic wrote that the film's "ludicrous thrills begin burning themselves out by the movie's midpoint", and added: "As the movie approaches its two-and-a-half hour mark, you, too, may feel that The End can't come soon enough." Tim Robey of The Daily Telegraph gave the film 2 out of 5 stars, saying that it was "dim, dim, dim, and so absurdly overscaled that we're not supposed to mind." Linda Barnard of the Toronto Star gave the film 1 out of 4 stars, writing: "the clunky script and kitchen-sink approach to Emmerich's global apocalypse tale... makes the movie fail on a bunch of fronts."

=== Accolades ===
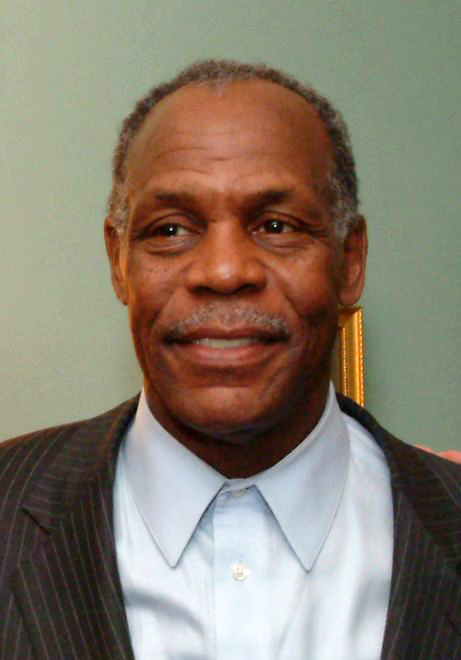
Danny Glover was nominated for an NAACP Image Award for his role as President Thomas Wilson.

Award	Category	Nominee(s)	Result
Broadcast Film Critics Association Awards	Best Visual Effects	Volker Engel, Marc Weigert, Mike Vézina	Nominated
NAACP Image Award	Outstanding Supporting Actor in a Motion Picture	Chiwetel Ejiofor	Nominated
NAACP Image Award	Outstanding Supporting Actor in a Motion Picture	Danny Glover	Nominated
Motion Picture Sound Editors	Best Sound Editing – Music in a Feature Film	Fernand Bos, Ronald J. Webb	Nominated
Motion Picture Sound Editors	Best Sound Editing – Sound Effects and Foley in a Feature Film	Fernand Bos, Ronald J. Webb	Nominated
Satellite Awards	Best Sound (Editing and Mixing)	Paul N.J. Ottosson, Michael McGee, Rick Kline, Jeffrey J. Haboush, Michael Keller	Won
Satellite Awards	Best Visual Effects	Volker Engel, Marc Weigert, Mike Vézina	Won
Satellite Awards	Best Art Direction and Production Design	Barry Chusid, Elizabeth Wilcox	Nominated
Satellite Awards	Best Film Editing	David Brenner, Peter S. Elliot	Nominated
Saturn Awards	Best Action, Adventure, or Thriller Film	2012	Nominated
Saturn Awards	Best Special Effects	Volker Engel, Marc Weigert, Mike Vézina	Nominated
Visual Effects Society Awards	Outstanding Visual Effects in a Visual Effects-Driven Feature Motion Picture	Volker Engel, Marc Weigert, Josh Jaggars	Nominated
Visual Effects Society Awards	Best Single Visual Effect of the Year	Volker Engel, Marc Weigert, Josh R. Jaggars, Mohen Leo for "Escape from L.A."	Nominated
Visual Effects Society Awards	Outstanding Created Environment in a Feature Motion Picture	Haarm-Pieter Duiker, Marten Larsson, Ryo Sakaguchi, Hanzhi Tang for "Los Angeles Destruction"	Nominated

== Canceled television spin-off ==
In 2010 Entertainment Weekly reported a planned spin-off television series, 2013, which would have been a sequel to the film. 2012 executive producer Mark Gordon told the magazine, "ABC will have an opening in their disaster-related programming after Lost ends, so people would be interested in this topic on a weekly basis. There's hope for the world despite the magnitude of the 2012 disaster as seen in the film. After the movie, there are some people who survive, and the question is how will these survivors build a new world and what will it look like. That might make an interesting TV series." However, plans were canceled for budget reasons.

== See also ==
- Apocalyptic fiction
