= The Frighteners =

1996 film by Peter Jackson

- Theatrical release poster
- Directed by: Peter Jackson
- Written by: Fran Walsh; Peter Jackson
- Produced by: Peter Jackson; Jamie Selkirk
- Starring: Michael J. Fox; Trini Alvarado; Peter Dobson; John Astin; Dee Wallace Stone; Jeffrey Combs; Jake Busey
- Cinematography: John Blick; Alun Bollinger
- Edited by: Jamie Selkirk
- Music by: Danny Elfman
- Production company: WingNut Films
- Distributed by: Universal Pictures
- Release date: July 19, 1996
- Running time: 110 minutes
- Countries: United States; New Zealand
- Language: English
- Budget: $26 million
- Box office: $29.3 million

The Frighteners is a 1996 supernatural comedy horror film directed by Peter Jackson and co-written with Fran Walsh. The film stars Michael J. Fox, Trini Alvarado, Peter Dobson, John Astin, Dee Wallace Stone, Jeffrey Combs, R. Lee Ermey and Jake Busey. The Frighteners tells the story of Frank Bannister (Fox), an architect who develops psychic abilities allowing him to see, hear, and communicate with ghosts after his wife's murder. He initially uses his new abilities to befriend ghosts, whom he sends to haunt people so that he can charge them handsome fees for "exorcising" the ghosts. However, the spirit of a mass murderer appears posing as the Grim Reaper, able to attack the living and the dead, prompting Frank to investigate the supernatural presence.

Jackson and Walsh conceived the idea for The Frighteners during the script-writing phase of Heavenly Creatures. Executive producer Robert Zemeckis hired the duo to write the script, with the original intention of Zemeckis directing The Frighteners as a spin-off film of the television series Tales from the Crypt. With Jackson and Walsh's first draft submitted in January 1994, Zemeckis believed the film would be better off directed by Jackson, produced by Zemeckis and funded/distributed by Universal Studios. The visual effects were created by Jackson's Weta Digital, which had only been in existence for three years. This, plus the fact that The Frighteners required more digital effects shots than almost any movie made until that time, resulted in the eighteen-month period for effects work by Weta Digital being largely stressed.

Despite a rushed post-production schedule, Universal was so impressed with Jackson's rough cut on The Frighteners, the studio moved the theatrical release date up by three months. The film was not a box office success, barely making back its budget, but received generally positive reviews from critics. The film gained a cult following and is considered an overlooked work in Jackson's catalog.

== Plot ==
In 1964, in the town of Fairwater, Johnny Bartlett is executed for murdering 12 people at Fairwater sanatorium, driven by his desire to become the most prolific serial killer. His teenage lover, Patricia Ann Bradley, is sentenced to prison despite a lack of evidence that she helped Bartlett. Decades later, she is released into her mother's custody.

In 1990, architect Frank Bannister is living a selfish, strained marriage with his wife, Debra. During a heated argument, he drunkenly crashes his car, and police later find Debra dead nearby, with the number "13" carved into her forehead. Though Frank has no memory of the incident, the trauma leaves him able to see the spirit world. In the present, he lives in the decrepit shell of the house he was building for Debra. Consumed by guilt, he has become a cynical con man, using his abilities to "exorcise" hauntings staged by ghostly partners—streetwise Cyrus, nerdy Stuart, and The Judge, an Old West gunslinger.

During a job at the home of physician Lucy Lynskey and her arrogant husband Ray, Frank notices the number "37" glowing on Ray's forehead. Ray dies shortly after of a heart attack. Helping Lucy communicate with Ray's ghost, Frank witnesses a Grim Reaper–like entity crush the heart of another man marked "38". Panicked, Frank flees and follows a heavenly light to the museum, where he finds the number 39 victim. Soon after, a newspaper editor, Magda Rees-Jones—who had previously accused Frank of Debra's murder—becomes victim number 40. The Reaper destroys The Judge in the process.

The mounting deaths implicate Frank, and he surrenders to the police. He is interrogated by Milton Dammers, a disturbed FBI agent traumatized by years of physical and sexual torture while working undercover in Satanic cults. Dammers is convinced Frank killed Debra and is psychically causing the unexplained heart attacks. Lucy visits Frank in jail, and they form a bond over shared loss. When the Reaper marks Lucy as victim 41, Cyrus and Stuart sacrifice themselves to save her and Frank. Unable to protect Lucy as a human, Frank has her induce a near-death state, slowing his heart with drugs and sealing him in a freezer. Dammers intervenes, capturing Lucy and leaving Frank to die, but Frank's spirit escapes and damages the pursuing Reaper's form, revealing it to be Bartlett himself.

After Frank revives, Lucy warns Patricia, her patient, about Bartlett, only to learn Patricia has remained devoted to him. Using his ashes she summoned his spirit from Hell to continue their killing spree, and murders her own mother to protect him. Frank and Lucy trap Bartlett in his urn and flee to the derelict sanatorium, planning to use its chapel to banish him to Hell. Pursued through the ruins by Patricia and Dammers, Frank experiences visions of the 1964 massacre, showing that Patricia actively participated in the killings. Frank also recalls that Bartlett's ghost murdered Debra, while Patricia carved the number into her forehead. Dammers unwittingly frees Bartlett from the urn and is promptly killed by Patricia.

Patricia strangles Frank to death, but Frank's spirit forcibly pulls Patricia's from her body and drags it toward Heaven, forcing Bartlett to follow. Bartlett frees her, but the pair are seized by a demonic force and dragged into Hell. In Heaven, Frank is reunited with Cyrus, Stuart, and Debra, who restore him to life on Earth; Debra tells him to be happy.

Some time later, Frank demolishes the unfinished house and begins a relationship with Lucy, who has now also gained the ability to see ghosts.

== Cast ==
- Michael J. Fox as Frank Bannister, a former architect turned ghost hunter after the trauma of his wife dying. Although Jackson and Walsh envisioned The Frighteners as a low-budget film with unknown actors, Zemeckis suggested casting his Back to the Future star Fox in the lead role. Fox became enthusiastic about working with Jackson when he saw Heavenly Creatures at the Toronto International Film Festival.
- Trini Alvarado as Lucy Lynskey, a physician that Frank meets. The character is named after Heavenly Creatures star Melanie Lynskey (who also cameos in The Frighteners).
- Peter Dobson as Ray Lynskey, Lucy's health-obsessed and comically hot-headed husband who dislikes Frank's tactics
- John Astin as The Judge, a decaying gunslinger ghost from the Old West with a penchant for mummies and firing guns at random.
- Jeffrey Combs as Milton Dammers, an eccentric FBI agent who has a vendetta against Bannister. A former undercover agent known for his work with cultists, which caused him to sustain multiple massive mutilations and drove him to the brink of insanity, he has a problem with women screaming at him. Jackson opted to cast Combs as Dammers because he was a fan of the actor's work in Re-Animator.
- Dee Wallace Stone as Patricia Bradley, inspired by Caril Ann Fugate. Bartlett's mentally ill lover (escaping execution at the time of the original murders as she was underage) who is under strict observation by her mother.
- Jake Busey as Johnny Bartlett, a mass murderer inspired by Charles Starkweather sharing the last name of his second and third victims, girlfriend and accomplice Caril Ann Fugate's mother and step-father Velda and Marion Bartlett. He continues his work in the afterlife, focusing on increasing his body count as a form of competition with other famous murderers. He returns from Hell, able to attack the living and the dead posing as the Grim Reaper.
- Chi McBride as Cyrus. One of Frank's deceased associates for his ghost-hunting business.
- Jim Fyfe as Stuart, a nerd who is one of Frank's deceased associates for his ghost-hunting business.
- Troy Evans as Sheriff Perry, a local law enforcement officer and ally to Frank.
- Julianna McCarthy as Old Lady Bradley, Patricia's mother and former director of the psychiatric hospital, who is constantly monitoring her daughter.
- R. Lee Ermey as Hiles, the ghost of a master sergeant. Ermey's performance in this film is heavily reminiscent of his performance as Gunnery Sergeant Hartman in the 1987 film Full Metal Jacket, sharing many mannerisms with the aforementioned character.
- Elizabeth Hawthorne as Magda Rees-Jones, the snooty British editor of the local newspaper.

In addition, brief cameos include Melanie Lynskey as a deputy seen standing next to Lucy Lynskey and Angela Bloomfield as Frank's deceased wife, Debra, while the film's director, Peter Jackson, has an uncredited cameo as a man with piercings.

== Production ==
=== Development ===
Peter Jackson and co-writer Fran Walsh conceived the idea for The Frighteners in 1992, during the script-writing phase of Heavenly Creatures. Together, they wrote a three-page film treatment and sent it to their talent agent in Hollywood. Robert Zemeckis viewed their treatment with the intention of directing The Frighteners as a spin-off film of the television series, Tales from the Crypt (which he helped produce). Zemeckis hired Jackson and Walsh to turn their treatment into a full-length screenplay in January 1993. The husband and wife duo completed their first draft for The Frighteners in early January 1994. Zemeckis was so impressed with their script, he decided The Frighteners would work better directed by Jackson, executive produced by Zemeckis and funded/distributed by Universal Pictures. Universal green-lighted the film to commence pre-production on a $26 million budget in April 1994. The studio also granted Jackson and Zemeckis total artistic control and the right of final cut privilege.

=== Filming ===
Jackson decided to film The Frighteners entirely in New Zealand. Zemeckis and Universal agreed on the condition that Jackson made New Zealand look similar to the Midwestern United States. Principal photography began on May 14, 1995, and lasted until November 16, which is one of the longest shooting schedules ever approved by Universal Pictures. Six weeks into the shoot, cinematographer Alun Bollinger had a serious car accident. His replacement, John Blick, later alternated duties with Bollinger for much of the rest of the shoot. Location shooting primarily included Wellington and three weeks spent in Lyttelton. Interior scenes were compiled at Camperdown Studios in Miramar.

=== Visual effects ===
Weta Digital created the visual effects and animation, which included CGI, as well as scale models (which were necessary to make Lyttelton look American), prosthetic makeup and practical effects with help from Weta Workshop. Visual effects supervisor Richard Taylor explained that effects work on The Frighteners was complex due to Weta's inexperience with computer technology in the mid-1990s. Prior to this film, Weta worked largely with physical effects. With so many ghosts among its main cast, The Frighteners required more digital effects shots than almost any movie made up till that time. For a special effects company that had been in existence less than three years, the eighteen-month period for completing The Frighteners was largely stressful. Some shots were handled by a small New Zealand company called Pixel Perfect, many of whose employees would eventually join Weta Digital. Rick Baker was hired to design the prosthetic makeup for The Judge, portrayed by John Astin (the detachable jawbone was later added digitally). However, Baker was not able to apply Astin's five hours of makeup due to his commitment on The Nutty Professor. Makeup artist Brian Penikas (Pirates of the Caribbean trilogy, Indiana Jones and the Kingdom of the Crystal Skull) fulfilled Baker's duties.

The extended shooting schedule owed much to the fact that scenes where ghosts and human characters interacted had to be filmed twice; once with human characters acting on set, and then with the ghost characters acting against a blue screen. The two elements would later be digitally composited into one shot with the use of split screen photography. Such sequences required precise timing from the cast as they traded dialogue with characters who were merely blank air. The hardest challenge for the digital animators at Weta was creating the Grim Reaper, which went through many transformations before finding physical form. "We set out with the intention of doing the Reaper as a rod puppet, maybe shooting it in a water tank," Jackson commented. "We even thought of filming someone, dressed in costume, at different camera speeds." Test footage was shot with puppets and a man in a Reaper suit, but in the end, it was decided that using computer animation would be the easiest task. Another character called "the Gatekeeper", a winged cherub who helps guard the cemetery, was deleted from the final cut.

With digital effects work running behind schedule, Zemeckis convinced Wes Takahashi, an animation supervisor from visual effects company Industrial Light & Magic (ILM) to help work on The Frighteners. "The shots Zemeckis showed me were pretty remarkable," Takahashi reflected, "but there were still about 400 shots to do, and everyone was kind of worried." Takahashi was quickly drafted as a visual effects supervisor, and began looking at the schedule, trying to work out whether The Frighteners could be finished in time. "There was no way we'd make the deadline. I figured out a concerted plan involving Jackson and Zemeckis to convince Universal it was worthy of asking for more money." The executives at Universal proposed splitting some of the shots to visual effects companies in the United States, but Jackson, for whom the film was a chance to show New Zealand filmmaking could stand alongside Hollywood, convinced Universal otherwise. Instead, The Frighteners received an accelerated release date, four months earlier than planned, and an additional $6 million in financing, with fifteen digital animators and computer workstations (some were borrowed from Universal and other effects companies in the US).

== Soundtrack ==
The film score was written and composed by Danny Elfman. It was released in 1996 on cassette and compact disc by MCA Records and Universal Records. The closing credits play a cover of Blue Öyster Cult's "(Don't Fear) The Reaper" performed by New Zealand alternative rock band The Mutton Birds. The Mutton Birds version of the song had been previously released as a B-side to their single "She's Been Talking" released in 1996. The credits also feature "Superstar", written by Bonnie Bramlett and Leon Russell, and performed by Sonic Youth.

== Release ==
=== Theatrical ===
The intended release date was October 1996, but after Universal studio executives viewed a rough cut of The Frighteners, they were impressed enough to move the release date to their "summer blockbuster slot" on July 19, 1996. In addition, Universal offered Jackson the opportunity to make King Kong, which was not released until 2005. Jackson often disputed the Motion Picture Association of America (MPAA)'s decision on the film's rating. Aware that he was meant to be delivering Universal a PG-13 rated film, Jackson tried his best to omit graphic violence as much as possible, but the MPAA still believed The Frighteners deserved an R rating.

=== Home media ===
The Frighteners was released on Laserdisc in 1996 in a standard release with Dolby surround on both Digital and Analog channels.

In 1998 Universal Home Video as part of the Signature Series collection released a special edition. This includes the first release of the 14-minute longer "director's cut", as well as other extras such as commentary by Jackson. deleted scenes, and the 4-hour documentary The Making of The Frighteners.

The Frighteners was first released on DVD in August 1998, but included no special features.

To coincide with the release of Jackson's King Kong, Universal Studios Home Entertainment issued a double-sided director's cut DVD of the film in November 2005, which featured a version of The Frighteners that is 14 minutes longer. The other side includes a documentary prepared by Jackson and WingNut Films originally for the Laserdisc release. The theatrical and director's cuts were also made available on HD-DVD in 2007, and Blu-ray in 2011.

== Reception ==
=== Box office ===
The Frighteners was released in the United States in 1,675 theaters, and opened at #5, earning $5,565,495 during its opening weekend, averaging $3,335 per theater. The film eventually grossed a worldwide total of $29,359,216. The Frighteners ended up being a box office disappointment, mostly due to competition from Independence Day; in interviews conducted years after The Frighteners' release, Jackson commented he was disappointed by Universal's ubiquitous marketing campaign, including a poster which "didn't tell you anything about the picture", which he believed was the primary reason the film was not a financial success. Additionally, the film opened on the same day the Atlanta Summer Olympics began; when Jackson realized this and told the studio, they answered "'We don't think so; our research indicates that's not the case...' And I just thought how the hell do they know? There had only ever been three Olympic Games held in the United States in one hundred years!" Jackson acknowledged The Frighteners' tone made it hard to pigeon-hole and sell, and his experience on the film made him understand the importance of marketing.

=== Critical reception ===
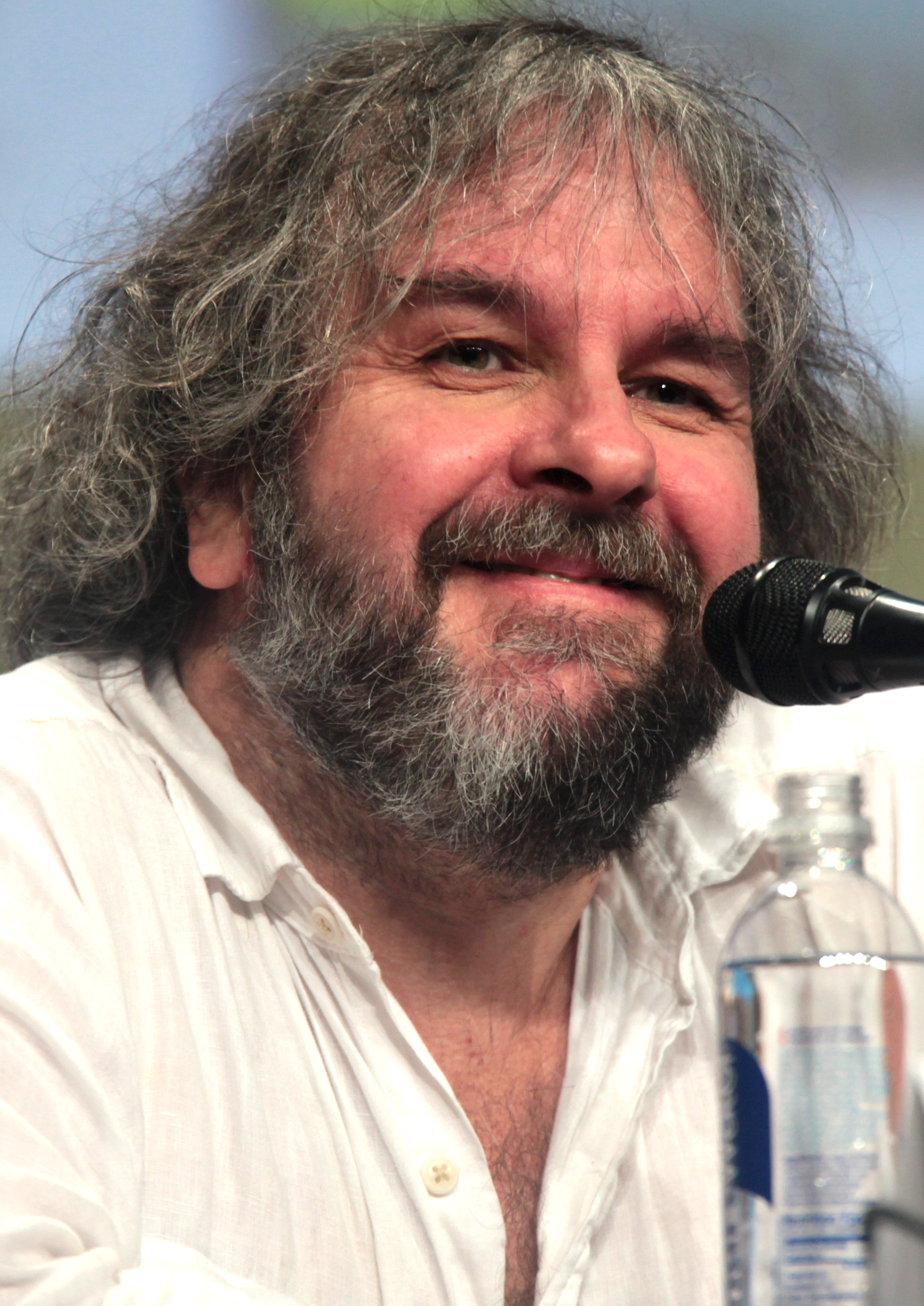
Peter Jackson received two Saturn Award nominations.

As of October 26, 2026, 67% of the 45 reviewers selected by review aggregator Rotten Tomatoes gave The Frighteners a positive review, and the average score is 6.2/10. The website's critical consensus states, "Boasting top-notch special effects and exuberant direction from Peter Jackson, The Frighteners is visually striking but tonally uneven." Audiences polled by CinemaScore gave the film an average grade of "B−" on an A+ to F scale.

Kenneth Turan of the Los Angeles Times stated "Director Peter Jackson, at home with all kinds of excess in New Zealand, keeps everything spinning nicely, not even losing a step when the mood turns increasingly disturbing." Janet Maslin from The New York Times enjoyed The Frighteners, but "walked out the theater with mixed emotions," she commented that "Peter Jackson deserves more enthusiasm for expert, imaginative effects than for his live actors anyhow. These lively touches would leave The Frighteners looking more like a more frantic Beetlejuice if Jackson's film weren't so wearyingly overcrowded. The Frighteners is not immune to overkill, even though most of its characters are already dead." Jeff Vice of the Deseret News praised the acting in the film, with the performances of Fox and Alvarado in particular, but said that there were also "bits that push the taste barrier too far and which grind things to a screeching halt", and that if "Jackson had used the restraint he showed in Heavenly Creatures, the movie could have "been the best of its kind". Critic Christopher Null praised the film, as he described it as a mixture between Ghostbusters and Twin Peaks. Michael Drucker of IGN said that although the film would not make Jackson's top five of movies, it "is a harmless and fun dark comedy that you'll enjoy casually watching from time to time". The Frighteners received mixed reviews by critics from Jackson's native country, New Zealand.

Conversely, Todd McCarthy of Variety thought that the film should have remained an episode of Tales from the Crypt. Critic James Berardinelli believed that although The Frighteners wasn't "a bad film", it was "a disappointment, following Jackson's powerful, true-life matricide tale, Heavenly Creatures", and because of that "The Frighteners fell short of expectations by being just one of many in the long line of 1996 summer movies." Chicago Sun-Times' Roger Ebert gave the film one star out of four, and felt that Jackson was more interested in prosthetic makeup designs, computer animation, and special effects than writing a cohesive storyline. Ebert and critic Gene Siskel gave it a "two thumbs down" rating on their TV show At the Movies with Gene Siskel and Roger Ebert. Chicago Reader critic Jonathan Rosenbaum, described the film's special effects as "ugly, aggressive" and "proliferating", saying that "trying to keep interested in [the special effects] was like trying to remain interested in a loudmouth shouting in [his] ear". Edward Guthmann of the San Francisco Chronicle stated that "instead of moving the horror genre in new directions, The Frighteners simply falls apart from its barrage of visual effects and the overmixed onslaught of Danny Elfman's music score". The Austin Chronicle's Joey O'Brien, said that although the screenplay was "practically loaded with wild ideas, knowingly campy dialogue and offbeat characterizations", it "switched gears" too fast and too frequently that "the audience is left struggling to catch up as [The Frighteners] twists and turns its way unmercifully towards a literally out-of-this-world finale".

=== Accolades ===
At the 23rd Saturn Awards, the Academy of Science Fiction, Fantasy and Horror Films honored Jackson with nominations for Best Director and Best Writing, the latter he shared with wife Fran Walsh. The Frighteners also was nominated for Best Horror Film, and for its Special Effects, Make-up (Rick Baker) and Music (Danny Elfman). Michael J. Fox and Jeffrey Combs were also nominated for their work.

== See also ==
- List of ghost films
- "The Purple Testament", an episode of The Twilight Zone with a similar plotline

== Bibliography ==
- Michael Jahn (July 1996). The Frighteners: A Novel. Novelization of the film. Berkley Books. ISBN 9781572971875.
