= Rich Kids (film) =

1979 American film by Robert M. Young

- Theatrical release poster
- Directed by: Robert M. Young
- Written by: Judith Ross
- Produced by: Robert Altman; George W. George; Michael Hausman
- Starring: Trini Alvarado; Jeremy Levy; Kathryn Walker; John Lithgow; Terry Kiser; David Selby; Roberta Maxwell; Paul Dooley; Irene Worth
- Cinematography: Ralf D. Bode
- Edited by: Edward Beyer
- Music by: Craig Doerge
- Production company: Lion's Gate Films
- Distributed by: United Artists
- Release date: August 17, 1979
- Running time: 101 minutes
- Country: United States
- Language: English
- Budget: $2.5 million
- Box office: $1,856,122

Rich Kids is a 1979 American comedy-drama film directed by Robert M. Young and starring Trini Alvarado and Jeremy Levy. It was nominated for two Young Artist Awards at the 1st Youth in Film Awards, held in 1979.

== Premise ==
Two 12-year-olds, the products of Upper West Side broken homes, struggle to make sense of their parents' lives and their own adolescent feelings.

== Cast ==
- Trini Alvarado as Franny Phillips
- Jeremy Levy as Jamie Harris
- Kathryn Walker as Madeline Phillips
- John Lithgow as Paul Phillips
- Terry Kiser as Ralph Harris
- David Selby as Steve Sloan
- Paul Dooley as Simon Peterfreund
- Roberta Maxwell as Barbara Peterfreund
- Beatrice Winde as Corine

This was the first film for both Alvarado and Levy, who were top-billed: a rare distinction for actors making their film debut. (Alvarado went onto a long career in films and television, but "Rich Kids" was Levy's first and only film: afterwards, he dropped out of acting and later became a physics professor at the University of Pittsburgh.)

== Reception ==
Vincent Canby of The New York Times called the film a "beautifully acted, sometimes very funny new comedy" that "observes its characters with sensitivity as well as humor." A review in Variety called the film "mildly funny, mildly heart-tugging and extremely well acted," though "the serious underpinnings are frequently undermined and diluted by sitcom contrivances." Gene Siskel of the Chicago Tribune gave the film 2.5 stars out of 4 and called it "a weak imitation of Paul Mazursky's 'An Unmarried Woman,'" adding, "It's clear the film would like to develop our sympathy for the girl's mother, who is trying to get herself together in order to face life alone. But every time the film begins to develop her character, it cuts away to the cutesy, idyllic story of the two kids, and we're back to a 'precious youngsters' film." Charles Champlin of the Los Angeles Times called the film "exactly what it set out to be, a nice little picture, refreshing and unimposing as a new wine and with a very pleasant aftertaste." Judith Martin of The Washington Post wrote, "Some of it is funny and some touching, and the low-key, realistic writing (by Judith Ross) and acting (by Trini Alvarado and Jeremy Levy as the children, and Kathryn Walker, John Lithgow, Terry Kiser, Roberta Maxwell and Paul Dooley as the adults) make many episodes seem valid. But when the children talk them over, with their superior moral sense and vaster understanding, heartwarming is not really the term for them. 'Insufferable' would be more like it." Jack Kroll of Newsweek called the film "a stylish, affectionate look at the great American institution of divorce among the affluent ... Twelve-year-old Trini Alvarado and 14-year-old Jeremy Levy are very appealing and directed well by Young: their half-forlorn, half-cynical sagacity is funny and touching, and their friendship, with its tentative sexuality, is the realest relationship in the movie." Tom Milne of The Monthly Film Bulletin wrote, "Rich Kids must have seemed like a good idea at the time, contrasting the innocent candour of childhood mendacity with the altogether more harmful adult variety. In the event, however, the script is much too cute for its own good."
