= Nitti: The Enforcer =

- Genre: Crime; Drama
- Written by: Lee David Zlotoff
- Directed by: Michael Switzer
- Starring: Anthony LaPaglia; Vincent Guastaferro; Trini Alvarado; Michael Moriarty
- Music by: Yanni
- Country of origin: United States
- Original language: English

Production
- Executive producers: Leonard Hill; Robert O'Connor
- Producers: Joel Fields; Lee David Zlotoff
- Cinematography: Paul Onorato
- Editor: Daniel T. Cahn
- Running time: 96 minutes
- Production companies: Giro International; Leonard Hill Films

Original release
- Network: ABC
- Release: April 17, 1988

Nitti: The Enforcer is a made for television movie that is a biography of Al Capone's enforcer Frank Nitti. Music for the film was written by Yanni.

== Cast ==
- Anthony LaPaglia as Frank Nitti
- Vincent Guastaferro as Al Capone
- Trini Alvarado as Anna
- Michael Moriarty as Hugh Kelly
- Bruce Kirby as Anton Cermak
- Mike Starr as Harry Lang

== Sources ==
Nitti: The Enforcer at IMDB
