= Joe Viskocil =

American special effects artist

- Born: December 21, 1952
- Died: August 11, 2014 (aged 61); Los Angeles, California
- Occupation: Visual effects artist
- Years active: 1974–2014

Joseph Viskocil (December 21, 1952 – August 11, 2014) was an American special effects artist who had over 80 film credits from 1974 to 2014. He created special effects for some of the most famous movie franchises and was awarded an Academy Award for his work on Independence Day (1996).

== Career ==
In 1977, Viskocil assisted John Dykstra and George Lucas in creating the pyrotechnics for Star Wars, including the explosion of the Death Star at the film's climax. In 1980, he returned to create pyrotechnics for The Empire Strikes Back. For the next three decades, he worked on films from the most famous franchises, including Ghostbusters, Batman and Star Trek.

After serving as pyrotechnics supervisor for the 1996 film Independence Day, Viskocil was awarded the Academy Award for Best Visual Effects alongside Volker Engel, Douglas Smith and Clay Pinney at the 69th Academy Awards. Viskocil and miniature supervisor Mike Joyce were responsible for the creation of a 15-foot-wide, 5-foot-high (4.57 metres by 1.52 metres) miniature of the White House, built for destruction during the film.

=== Style ===
In the 1990s, Viskocil opposed using computer-generated imagery in the creation of some special effects:

When it comes to pyro techniques, what was done 50 years ago is still good today. There are a billion chemicals out there now that one can add, subtract or manipulate to create a desired effect.

Following the September 11 attacks, Viskocil expressed guilt over making the explosions in Independence Day appear lifelike, saying "I started thinking maybe I did my job too well, and it might have been the nucleus of an idea for someone to say: ‘Hey, let’s crash a plane into the White House.’"

== Personal life ==
Viskocil died on August 11, 2014, in Los Angeles from complications of liver and heart failure.

== Filmography ==
Year	Title	Role	Notes	Ref.
1977	Star Wars			
1980	The Empire Strikes Back			
1984	Ghostbusters			
1984	The Terminator			
1985	The Return of the Living Dead			
1987	Masters of the Universe			
1988	Killer Klowns From Outer Space			
1989	The Abyss			
1991	Barton Fink			
1991	Terminator 2: Judgment Day			
1992	Batman Returns			
1994	True Lies			
1995	Apollo 13			
1995	Johnny Mnemonic			
1996	Independence Day	Pyrotechnics supervisor		
1997	Alien Resurrection			
1997	Volcano			
2000	Battlefield Earth			
2002	Panic Room			
2002	Star Trek: Nemesis			
2004	Team America: World Police	Pyrotechnics supervisor		
2011	Source Code			
2022	The Prey: Legend of the Karnoctus		Posthumous release	

== Awards ==
Year	Category	Nominated work	Result	Ref.
1996	Academy Award for Best Visual Effects	Independence Day	Won	
2017	Visual Effects Society Hall of Fame	—N/a	Won	
