= Douglas Smith (special effects artist) =

Visual effects artist

- Born: Douglas Hans Smith
- Other name: Douglas H. Smith
- Occupation: Visual effects artist
- Years active: 1977-present

Douglas Smith is a special effects artist who is best known as one of the people who won at the 69th Academy Awards for Best Visual Effects on the film Independence Day. He won with Volker Engel, Clay Pinney and Joe Viskocil.

== Selected filmography ==
- Winter's Tale (2014)
- Percy Jackson: Sea of Monsters (2013)
- Alvin and the Chipmunks: Chipwrecked (2011)
- Aliens in the Attic (2009)
- Alvin and the Chipmunks: The Squeakquel (2009)
- Evan Almighty (2007)
- Garfield: A Tail of Two Kitties (2006)
- The Flintstones in Viva Rock Vegas (2000)
- Flubber (1997)
- Independence Day (1996)
- True Lies (1994)
- Spaceballs (1987)
- Star Trek: The Motion Picture (1979)
- Star Wars (1977)
