= Jeremy Levy =

American physicist (born 1965)

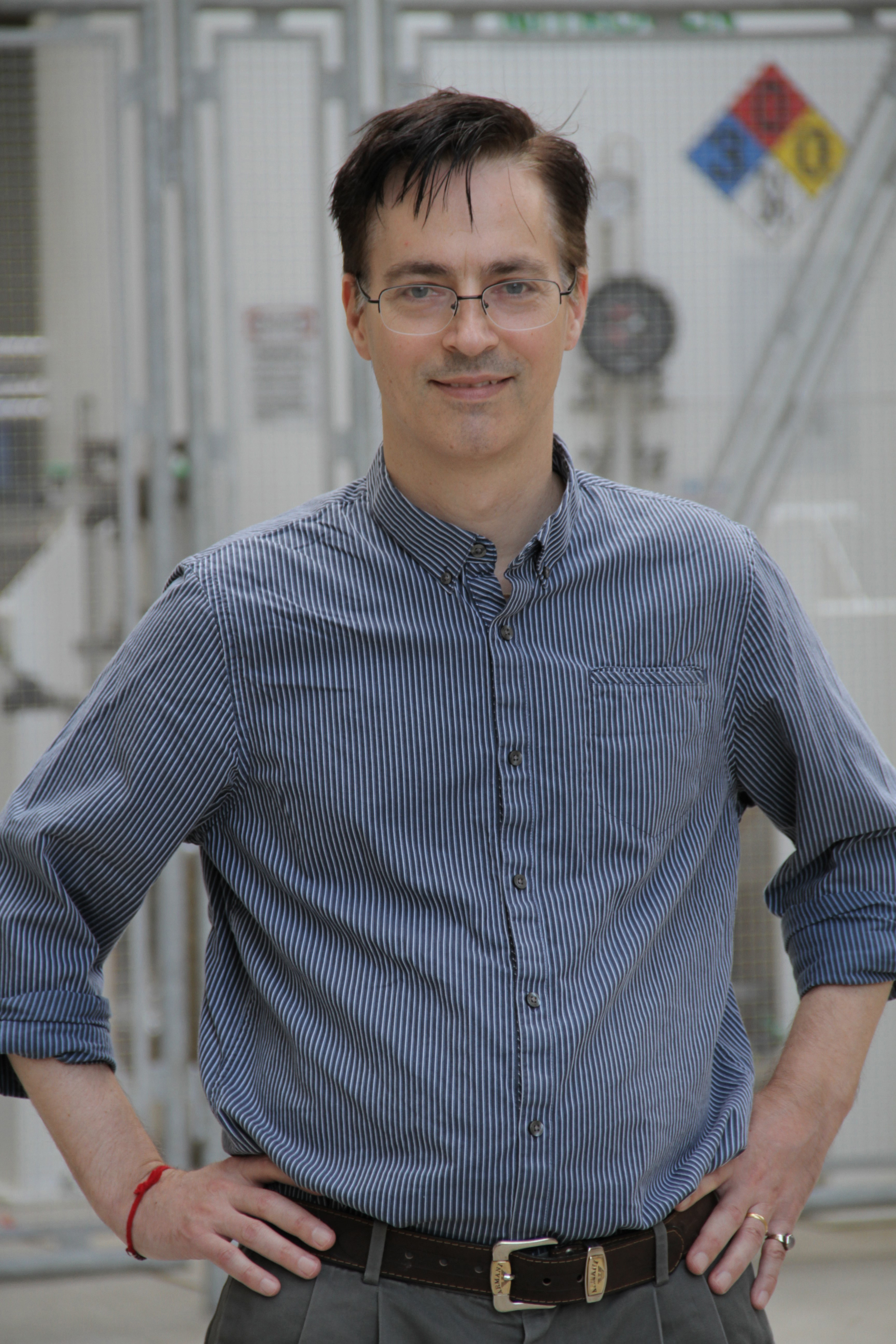
- Levy at the University of Pittsburgh (2015)
- Born: May 18, 1965 (age 61); New York City, New York, U.S.
- Education: University of California Santa Barbara (Ph.D); Harvard University (BA)
- Spouse: Chandralekha Singh (m. 1990)
- Children: 2
- Scientific career
- Fields: Condensed Matter Physics
- Workplaces: University of Pittsburgh; University of California Santa Barbara; Harvard University
- Doctoral advisor: Mark Sherwin
- Website: Jeremy Levy's Lab; Jeremy Levy's Google Scholar Page

Jeremy Levy (born May 18, 1965) is an American physicist who is a Distinguished Professor of Physics at the University of Pittsburgh.

== Education and career ==
Levy received his B.A. degree from Harvard University (1988), and his Ph.D. in physics from University of California, Santa Barbara (1993) under the supervision of Mark Sherwin. After his Ph.D., he was a postdoctoral researcher at the University of California, Santa Barbara with David Awschalom. He started his independent academic career as an assistant professor in physics in 1996 and currently distinguished professor of physics in the department of physics and astronomy at the University of Pittsburgh. He also holds an Adjunct Faculty position in both physics and electrical and computer engineering departments at Carnegie Mellon University.

=== Early acting career ===
Levy also worked as a film and television actor from age 11 to 12. He acted in NBC's Holocaust, and played the role of Aaron Feldman. He also had a lead role in the feature film Rich Kids, playing the role of Jamie Harris. His Erdős number is 6 and his Bacon number is 2, making his Erdős-Bacon number equal to 8.

=== Other professional activities ===
Apart from his research, Levy served for a decade as founding director of the Pittsburgh Quantum Institute (PQI) from 2012-2022, whose mission is “to help unify and promote quantum science and engineering in Pittsburgh.” PQI has over 100 Faculty members in multiple departments at the University of Pittsburgh, Carnegie Mellon University, and Duquesne University.

== Areas of research ==
Levy's research interests center around the emerging field of oxide nanoelectronics, experimental and theoretical realizations for quantum computation, semiconductor and oxide spintronics, quantum transport and nanoscale optics, and dynamical phenomena in oxide materials and films. Levy’s early Ph.D. research focused on the nonlinear dynamical properties of sliding charge-density waves. His postdoctoral research investigated the properties of dilute magnetic semiconductor heterostructures, where he developed a low-temperature near-field scanning optical microscope and used it to investigate Mn-doped ZnSe/(Zn,Cd)Se heterostructure and superlattices as well as self-assembled quantum dots.

After moving to the University of Pittsburgh, Levy began a research program centered around high-resolution imaging of the spatial and temporal dynamics of ferroelectric thin films. In 1999, Levy worked toward an experimental realization of a quantum computer based on ferroelectrically coupled Ge/Si quantum dots. Levy was funded through the DARPA QuIST program that supported the Center for Oxide-Semiconductor Materials for Quantum Computation, which Levy directed for 10 years. During that time, Levy initiated a theoretical research effort aimed at developing various families of logical qubits based on spin pairs, spin clusters, cluster-state qubits, and dimerized spin chains.

In 2006, Levy visited the group of Jochen Mannhart who had discovered a sharp insulator-to-metal transition in oxide heterostructure composed of a thin layer of LaAlO_{3} grown on TiO_{2}-terminated SrTiO_{3}. The 3-unit-cell LaAlO_{3}/SrTiO_{3} was metastable and could be switched with a voltage applied to the back of the SrTiO_{3}substrate. Levy and his student Cheng Cen showed that a biased conductive atomic force microscope tip could locally switch the interface of the 3-unit-cell LaAlO_{3}/SrTiO_{3} heterostructure system, thus launching a new field that Levy refers to as “Correlated Nanoelectronics ”.

=== Other areas of research ===
Levy has conducted research in a variety of areas:

- Apertureless near-field scanning optical microscopy, applied principally to polar nanodomains in ferroelectric thin films.
- Development of g-tensor modulation resonance as a method for all-electrical control of spin in semiconductor heterostructure.
- Development of conductive-AFM lithography for extreme nanoscale control of the metal-insulator transition in LaAlO_{3}/SrTiO_{3}heterostructure.
- Discovery of room-temperature electronically controlled ferromagnetism in LaAlO_{3}/SrTiO_{3} heterostructure.
- Development of sketched LaAlO_{3}/SrTiO_{3} single-electron transistors, electron waveguides, and other mesoscopic physics devices
- Discovery of electron pairing without superconductivity in sketched LaAlO_{3}/SrTiO_{3} devices.
- Development of 100 THz-bandwidth generation and detection of THz emission in nanoscale LaAlO_{3}/SrTiO_{3} junctions

== Personal life ==
Levy was born in New York City. In 1990, he married Chandralekha Singh who is also a physicist and currently a distinguished professor in the department of physics and astronomy at the University of Pittsburgh. They were classmates in the Ph.D. program at the University of California, Santa Barbara. They have two sons Akash Levy and Ishan Levy.

== Awards and honors ==
- NSF CAREER Award, 1997
- Chancellor's Distinguished Research Award (Junior Category), University of Pittsburgh, 2004
- Chancellor's Distinguished Teaching Award, University of Pittsburgh, 2007
- Nano 50 Innovator Award, 2008
- Fellow, American Physical Society (DCMP), 2009
- Chancellor's Distinguished Research Award (Senior Category), University of Pittsburgh, 2011
- Fellow, Vannevar Bush Faculty, class of 2015
- Fellow, American Association for the Advancement of Science, 2018
