= Uncharted Territory, LLC =

American film production company

Uncharted Territory, LLC is an American visual effects company based in Los Angeles, California. The company was founded in 1999 by visual effects supervisor and producer Volker Engel and VFX supervisor and producer Marc Weigert and often work on films by their collaborators Dean Devlin and Roland Emmerich after the dissolution of Centropolis Entertainment's in-house visual effects studio.

The company briefly had a subsidiary in Munich: Uncharted Territory GmbH.

== Productions ==
- Coronado (2003)
- Dark Kingdom: The Dragon King (2004)
- The Triangle (2005)

== Visual effects productions ==
- Coronado (2003)
- Dark Kingdom: The Dragon King (2004)
- The Day After Tomorrow (2004)
- The Triangle (2005)
- 2012 (2009)
- Anonymous (2011)
- White House Down (2013)
- Independence Day: Resurgence (2016)
