= Clay Pinney =

American special effects artist

- Born: Clayton Willis Pinney; May 30, 1946
- Died: November 1, 2022 (aged 76)
- Other name: Clayton Pinney
- Occupation: Visual effects artist
- Years active: 1983-2015

Clayton Willis Pinney (May 30, 1946 – November 1, 2022) was an American special effects artist who has won an Academy Award for visual effects as well as an Academy Award for Technical Achievement. His name was mentioned at the 95th Academy Awards in the In Memorian section.

== Oscar history ==
Both are in the category of Best Visual Effects.

- 64th Academy Awards-Nominated for Backdraft. Nomination shared with Scott Farrar, Allen Hall and Mikael Salomon. Lost to Terminator 2: Judgment Day.
- 69th Academy Awards-Independence Day. Shared with Volker Engel, Douglas Smith and Joe Viskocil. Won.

In addition, he received the Academy Award for Technical Achievement during the 86th Academy Awards.

== Selected filmography ==
- RoboCop (2014)
- Man of Steel (2013)
- Pacific Rim (2013)
- Star Trek (2009)
- Rush Hour 3 (2007)
- The Matrix Reloaded (2003)
- Peter Pan (2003)
- Godzilla (1998)
- Volcano (1997)
- Independence Day (1996)
- Backdraft (1991)
- Who Framed Roger Rabbit (1988)
- Star Trek IV: The Voyage Home (1986)
- The Man with Two Brains (1983)
