= Volker Engel =

German special effects artist

- Born: February 17, 1965 (age 61); Bremerhaven, West Germany
- Occupation: Visual effects artist
- Years active: 1990-present

Volker Engel (born February 17, 1965) is a German special effects artist who known for his collaboration with director Roland Emmerich for his films, including Independence Day (1996), which won the Best Visual Effects at the 69th Academy Awards alongside Douglas Smith, Clay Pinney and Joe Viskocil. In 1999, he founded the visual effects company Uncharted Territory, LLC with Marc Weigert.

== Selected filmography ==
- White House Down (2013)
- Hugo (2011)
- 2012 (2009)
- The Triangle (2005)
- Dark Kingdom: The Dragon King (2004)
- Godzilla (1998)
- Independence Day (1996)

== See also ==
- List of German-speaking Academy Award winners and nominees
