= Tiszaalpár =

- Large village
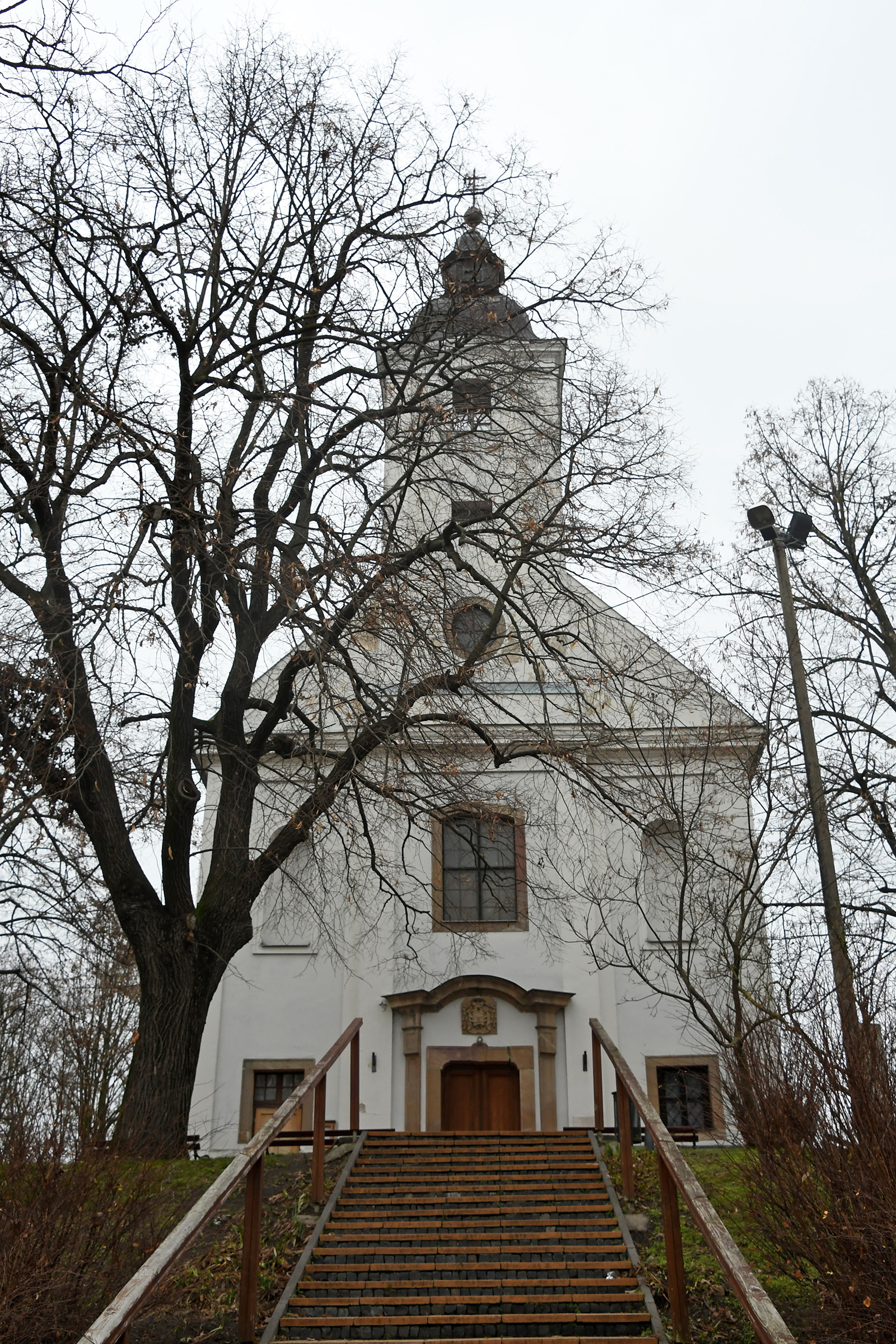
- The Roman Catholic Church of Our Lady of Good Counsel in Tiszaalpár

- Coat of arms
- Interactive map of Tiszaalpár
- Coordinates: 46°48′47″N 19°59′38″E
- Country: Hungary
- Region: Southern Great Plain
- County: Bács-Kiskun
- District: Tiszakécske

Government
  - Mayor: Béla Ágoston (KDNP–National Forum–Tiszaalpár Farmers' Association)

Area
  - Total: 91.13 km^{2} (35.19 sq mi)
  - Density: 53.99/km^{2} (139.8/sq mi)
- Time zone: UTC+1 (CET)
  - Summer (DST): UTC+2 (CEST)
- Postal code: 6066
- Area code: 76
- Website: www.tiszaalpar.hu

Tiszaalpár is a large village (nagyközség) in the Tiszakécske District of Bács-Kiskun county, Hungary.

== Geography ==
The village lies in the eastern part of the county, on the right bank of the Tisza river. Its neighbors are Lakitelek to the north, Tiszaug to the northeast, Tiszasas to the east, Csongrád to the southeast, Kiskunfélegyháza to the southwest, and Nyárlőrinc to the northwest.

=== Transportation ===
By road, Tiszaalpár is accessible from the directions of Kecskemét, Csongrád, and Kiskunfélegyháza. From Kecskemét, one can take Main road 44 to Lakitelek-Kapásfalu (km 24), turn southeast toward Tőserdő on Road 4505, and then connect to Road 4625, which passes through the village. Road 4625 also serves as the main access route from Kiskunfélegyháza. From Csongrád, the village is reached by taking Road 4502 (branching off from Route 451) and then turning northeast onto Road 4501.

By train, the village is accessible via MÁV's Line 145 (Kiskunfélegyháza–Kunszentmárton line). There are four stops within the municipality:

- Tiszaalpár felső (Tiszaalpár Upper) serving the settlement of Árpádtelep along Road 4625.
- Tiszaalpár railway station near the center, served by Road 45303.
- Tiszaalpár alsó (Tiszaalpár Lower) near Árpádszállás at the junction of roads 4625 and 4502 (served by Road 45304).
- Borsihalom halt, located directly on the southwestern boundary.

== History ==
Tiszaalpár is an ancient settlement, with its territory inhabited since prehistoric times.

The settlement was first mentioned in a charter in 1075 under the name Olper, when King Géza I donated it to the Bishop of Vác. The area was already inhabited during the Hungarian conquest of the Carpathian Basin, as recorded by Anonymus, the nameless notary of King Béla III.

According to Anonymus's Gesta Hungarorum, the leader of the Hungarians, Árpád, sent envoys to the Bulgarian Duke Salan with the following request:

"For the sake of friendship with Salan, I ask for a small portion of my own right for my cattle, namely the land stretching to the Sajó River. Furthermore, I ask your leader to kindly send me two jugs filled with the water of the Danube, and a bundle of grass from the sand of Alpár, so that I may experience whether the grass of Alpár's sand is sweeter than the grass of the Scythian regions, and whether the water of the Danube is better than the water of the Don."

In exchange, Árpád sent gifts to Salan, including twelve white horses, twelve camels, twelve Cuman boys, and twelve skilled Russian girls for the duchess, along with precious furs and golden robes. Duke Salan jokingly sent the requested water and grass, but soon Árpád used the symbolic value of these gifts to demand much larger territories, arguing that Salan had surrendered his land by giving its grass and water. Duke Salan refused the demand, leading to an inevitable clash.

As Anonymus describes the Battle of Alpár:

"Duke Salan, along with auxiliary troops of Greeks and Bulgarians, set out from Titel and rode furiously against Árpád... In the morning, before dawn, both sides prepared for battle. Árpád, whose helper was the God of the universe, drew his weapons, set his battle lines, prayed to God with tears, and fired up his warriors... Hearing this, his warriors were greatly encouraged. Lél, son of Tas, blew his horn, and Bulcsú, son of Bogát, raised his banner, and they charged into battle..."

According to the chronicle, Duke Salan fled to Belgrade (Bolgárfejérvár) as his forces were defeated. The retreating Greek and Bulgarian troops, panicked by the Hungarians, tried to swim across the Tisza, but almost all drowned in the river. The place where they perished has since been called the "Grave of the Greeks" (görögök réve).

Since the publication of Anonymus's work in 1746, the local earthwork has been popularly known as "Zalán's Castle." This legend was widely popularized in Hungarian literature, most notably by Mihály Vörösmarty's 1825 epic poem, Zalán futása (The Flight of Zalán).

During the Ottoman occupation, the village was destroyed multiple times. In the 1559 Ottoman tax registers, it was listed with only 11 taxable houses. The area of Alsóalpár belonged to the Bishop of Vác, by 1715, it was still only a pasture belonging to Kecskemét, and it was resettled in 1727.

In December 1940, Prime Minister Pál Teleki and MÁV President István Horthy handed over houses built for flood victims in Alpár as part of the National Fund for People and Family Protection.

In 1973, the villages of Alpár and Tiszaújfalu were merged, creating modern-day Tiszaalpár.

== Politics ==
=== Mayors ===
- 1990–1994: Lajos Novák (Independent)
- 1994–1998: András Barton (Independent)
- 1998–2002: András Barton (MDF–FKgP–Fidesz–KDNP–VP)
- 2002–2006: Ferenc Bodor (Independent)
- 2006–2009: Ferenc Bodor (Independent)
- 2009–2010: Dr. István Vancsura (Independent)
- 2010–2014: Dr. István Vancsura (Independent)
- 2014–2019: Dr. István Vancsura (Independent)
- 2019–2024: Dr. István Vancsura (Independent)
- 2024– : Béla Ágoston (KDNP–National Forum Association–Tiszaalpár Farmers' Circle)

An interim mayoral election was held on December 13, 2009, due to the death of the previous mayor.

== Demographics ==
During the 2011 census, 91% of the population identified as Hungarian, 5.8% as Romani, 0.9% as German, and 0.2% as Romanian (8.9% did not declare their ethnicity). In terms of religious affiliation, 67.7% were Roman Catholic, 3.9% Calvinist, 0.3% Lutheran, and 0.3% Greek Catholic (18.7% did not declare).

By the 2022 census, 91.5% identified as Hungarian, 1.7% as Romani, 0.6% as German, 0.6% as Romanian, 0.1% as Ukrainian, and 1.4% as other non-Hungarian nationalities (8.4% did not declare). The religious distribution was 45.2% Roman Catholic, 3.9% Calvinist, 0.5% Greek Catholic, 0.3% Lutheran, 0.1% Orthodox, 2.1% other Christian, and 10.5% non-religious (36% did not answer).

== Local Heritage and Values ==
The local values and cultural heritage of the settlement are registered under the Hungarian National Values Act:

=== Agriculture and Food Industry ===
- Hungarian Grey Cattle herd
- Local honey production
- Artisanal cheese production
- Ground paprika spice production

=== Health and Lifestyle ===
- Geoway Edzés Egészség (Fitness & Health)

=== Built Environment ===
- Roman Catholic Church of Our Lady of Good Counsel (historic monument)
- Várkert (Castle Garden) and Szent István Street (protected historic settlement structure)
- Saint Stephen Roman Catholic Church
- Convent Church (Zárdatemplom)
- Statue of Grand Prince Árpád
- Patrona Hungariae Statue - World War I Memorial
- World War II Memorials
- Statue of John of Nepomuk
- Skanzen (Árpád-era Open-air museum)
- Statue of Mihály Bársony
- Statue of Unity (Egység szobor)

=== Industrial and Technical Solutions ===
- MATIC Kft. – Precision sheet metal fabrication, production of electrical terminal blocks, and assembly of fine mechanical and electromechanical components.
- Naturalpár Kft. – Production and distribution of ground paprika powder.
- Czinege Manufacture – Basket weaving and willow wickerwork crafting.
- Pentatrans Bt. – Road freight transport services.
- B&S Elastic Kft. – Production of technical and food-grade rubber products.

=== Cultural Heritage ===
- Castle Hill (Várdomb) and its historical surroundings.
- The literary work of folk writer Lajos Kádár.
- The musical and instrument-making legacy of Mihály Bársony (Master of Folk Arts, hurdy-gurdy player, clarinetist, and citternist).
- Traditional basket weaving crafts.

=== Natural Environment ===
- Alpár Meadow (Alpári rét) – Home to valuable protected flora such as the Water Violet (Hottonia palustris) and the Hungarian Daisy (Leucanthemella serotina).
- Rich bird fauna of the meadows – Supporting nesting colonies of the Sand Martin (Riparia riparia – protected) and the European Bee-eater (Merops apiaster – highly protected).
- Oxbow Lakes of the Tisza (Holt-Tisza) – Featuring European White Water Lily (Nymphaea alba), Yellow Water-lily (Nuphar lutea), and rootless duckweed.
- Nagy-tó (Great Lake) – A significant local habitat and stopover site for migratory bird species.
- Magas-part (High Bank) – The scenic loess bluff landscape.

=== Tourism, Gastronomy and Hospitality ===
- Skanzen (Árpád-era Open-air Museum)
- Csalogány Wedding and Event Venue – KalandFarm (Kátai Str. 37.)
- Birdwatching and recreational fishing competitions
- Fricska Pub - Rita Pub (Rákóczi Ferenc Str. 2.)
- Bableves Beerhouse (Hunyadi János Str. 47.)
- Vasas Beerhouse
- Tiszatáj Restaurant (Alkotmány Str. 8.)
- Pizza Plus Tiszaalpár (Ady Endre Str. 73.)
- Parti Resort (Ady Endre Str. 18.)
- Falevél Apartment (Alkotmány Str. 1.)
- Rigófütty Guesthouse (Szent István Str. 9.)
- Gesztenyés Apartment House (Dózsa György Str. 78.)

=== Public Communities and Craftsmen ===
- Civil Guard (Polgárőrség)
- Alpár Tisza Fishing Association (Alpári Tisza Horgász Egyesület)
- Association for the Physically Disabled (Mozgáskorlátozottak Egyesülete)
- Tiszaalpár Farmers' Association (Tiszaalpári Gazdakör)
- Tiszaalpár Equestrian Club (Tiszaalpári Lovas Egyesület)
- Tiszavirág Romani Heritage Preservation Association (Tiszavirág Cigány Hagyományőrző Egyesület)
- Local Seniors' Clubs: Grand Prince Árpád, Pensioners' Friendly Circle, Lajos Kádár Seniors' Club.
- János Kanalas – Master Folk Artist basket weaver
- Jánosné Kálmán – Wicker-wrapped glass craftsman
- Mária Almási Zaletnyikné – Richelieu embroidery maker
- Dezső Repáruk – Hurdy-gurdy instrument maker
- Renáta Illés – Gobelin embroidery artist
- Pál Palatinus – Woodcarver

=== Regular Events and Traditions ===
- Tiszaalpár Festival Days (Tiszaalpári napok)
- National Hurdy-Gurdy Meeting - BársonyFest (BársonyFeszt)
- Ancient Hungarian Assembly & Heritage Day (Ősi Magyar Szer Találkozó)
- Tiszaalpár Art Camp (TAT)
- Alpárfeszt (music festival, relocated to Lakitelek-Tőserdő in 2021)
- Tiszaalpár Tractor Day (Tiszaalpári Traktorosnap – annual since 2022)

=== Local Businesses ===
- Pici ABC (Mátyás király Str. 5.)
- Coop Store No. 51 (Szent Imre Sq. 1/A)
- Fonyó Grocery Store (Dózsa György Str. 61.)
- Sándorné Juhász Grocery (Bercsényi Str. 8/A)
- Cserkó Grocery (Kossuth Lajos Str. 75.)
- Farkas Grocery (Alkotmány Str. 11.)
- Farkas Greengrocer (Alkotmány Str. 12/A)
- Krisztina Hódi Fruit and Vegetable Store (Alkotmány Str. 38.)
- Baranyi Bakery and Confectionery (Alkotmány Str. 12.)
- Friss Bakery
- Bársony Florist (Szent Imre Sq. 5.)
- Virágkuckó Florist (Alkotmány Str. 36.)
- Farkas Stationery Store (Alkotmány Str. 12/A)
- Paint and Household Store (Alkotmány Str. 3.)
- Mini Discount (Alkotmány Str. 17.)
- Tulipán Clothing Store (Alkotmány Str. 22.)
- József Papp Butcher Shop (Dózsa György Str. 49.)
- Tiszaalpár Meat Shop (Szent Imre Sq. 1.)
- István Bartók Hardware and Household Store (Hunyadi János Str. 52.)
- National Tobacco Shop and Lottery (Alkotmány Str. 5.)
- National Tobacco Shop (Ady Endre Str. 4.)
- Laura Boutique
- Timi Fashion (Szent Imre Sq. 1.)
- Brekeke Fishing and Pet Food Store (Hunyadi János Str. 42.)
- Recreational Fishing Store (Bercsényi Str. 1.)

== Notable people ==
- Lajos Kádár (1896–1982), a Hungarian folk writer discovered by Zsigmond Móricz, was born here on 19 May 1896. Today, a street, a local community house, and a pensioners' club bear his name as a tribute.
- Mihály Bársony (1915–1989), a renowned hurdy-gurdy player, clarinetist, citternist, and musical instrument maker, who was awarded the prestigious "Master of Folk Art" title, was born in the village on 2 September 1915. A monument has been erected in his honor in Tiszaalpár.
- Zoltán Kásás (born 1946), an Olympic Games silver medalist, World and European Champion water polo player, and the father of the three-time Olympic Champion water polo player Tamás Kásás, was born here on 15 September 1946.

== Sights and Attractions ==
- Skanzen: A reconstruction of an Árpád-era (10th–11th century) Hungarian village.
- Templom-domb (Church Hill): Features the 18th-century Baroque Roman Catholic church, built between 1752 and 1755.
- Várdomb (Castle Hill): Contains the remains of an early medieval earthwork. Archaeological excavations revealed a Bronze Age rampart system spanning 22 hectares. The Árpád-era fort dates back to the 12th century, and its significance likely declined after the First Mongol invasion of Hungary. Artifacts found on the site range from the 12th to the 15th centuries.
- Alpár Meadow & Oxbow Lakes: Spanning several kilometers alongside the village, this wetland is part of the Kiskunság National Park, housing one of Europe's most diverse bird nesting sites.
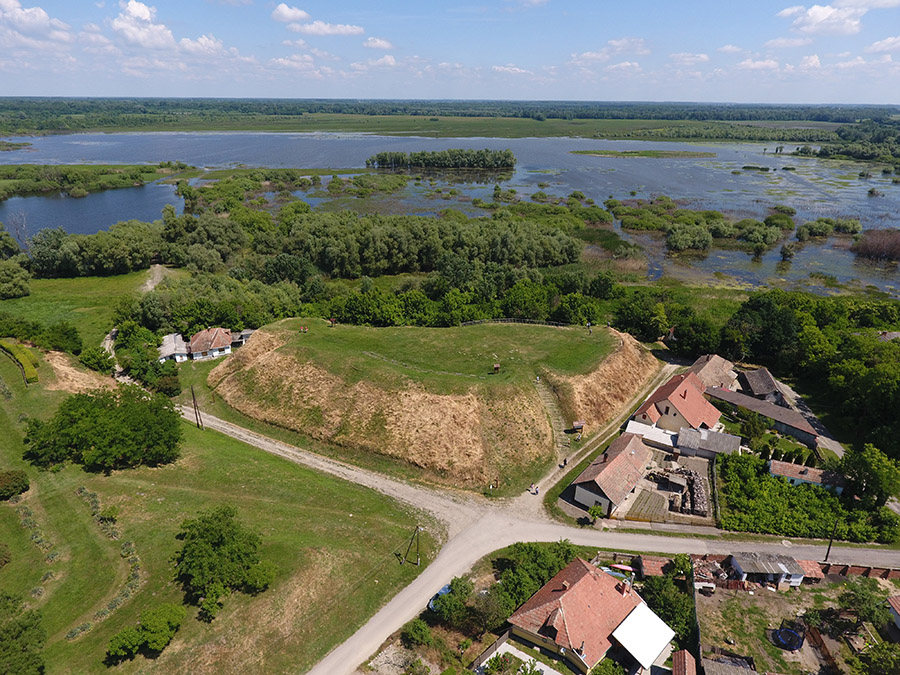
Aerial view of Church Hill and Castle Hill

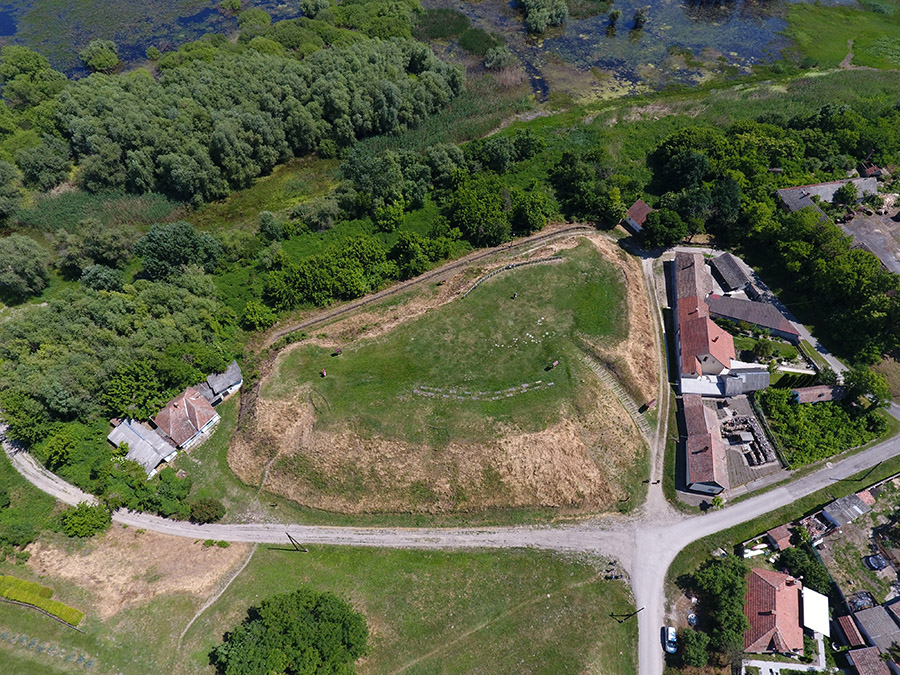
Aerial shot of the church and earthwork

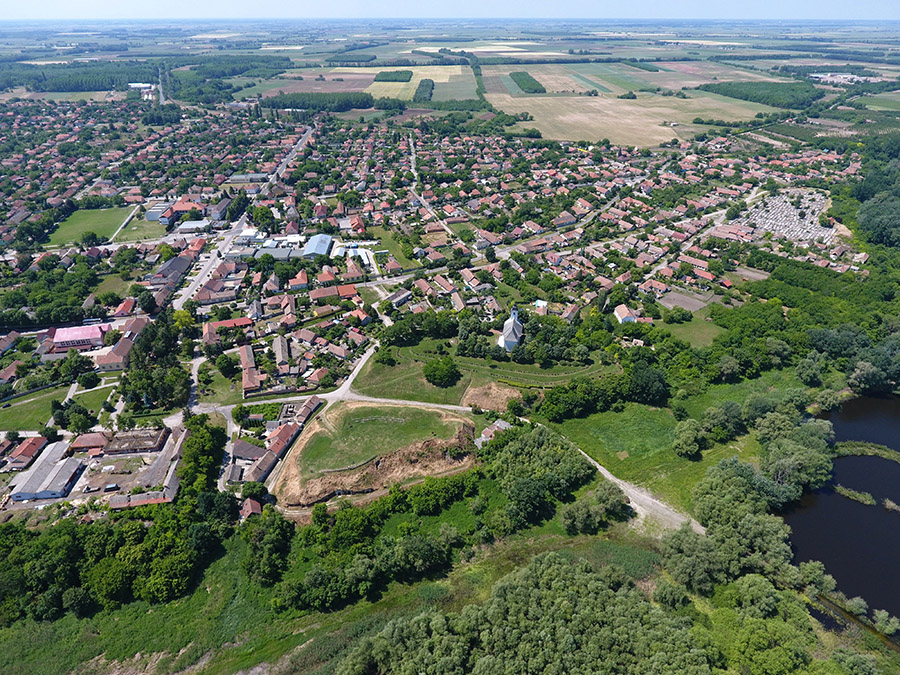
Castle Hill and surroundings from above

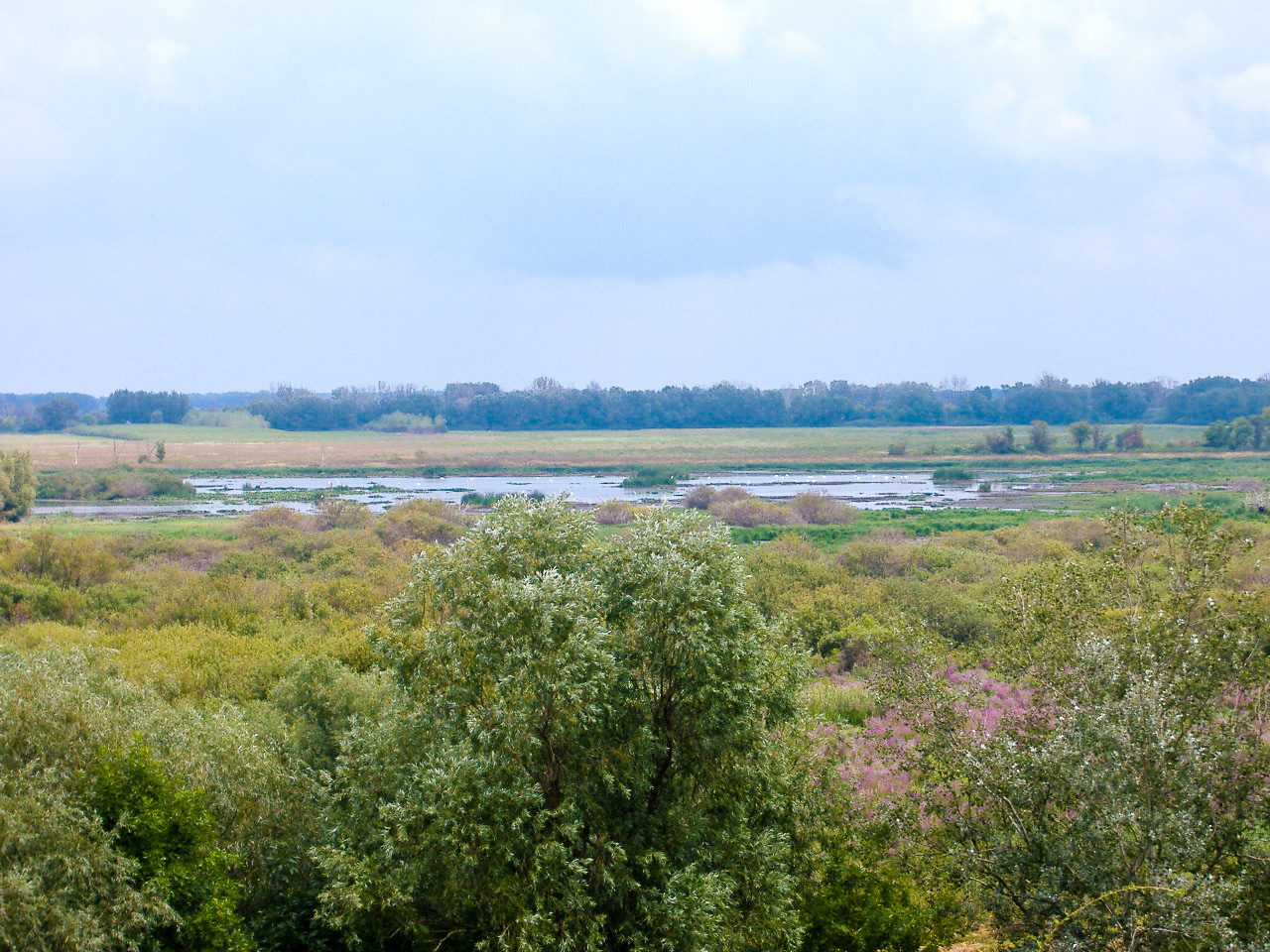
The Alpár Meadow, part of Kiskunság National Park

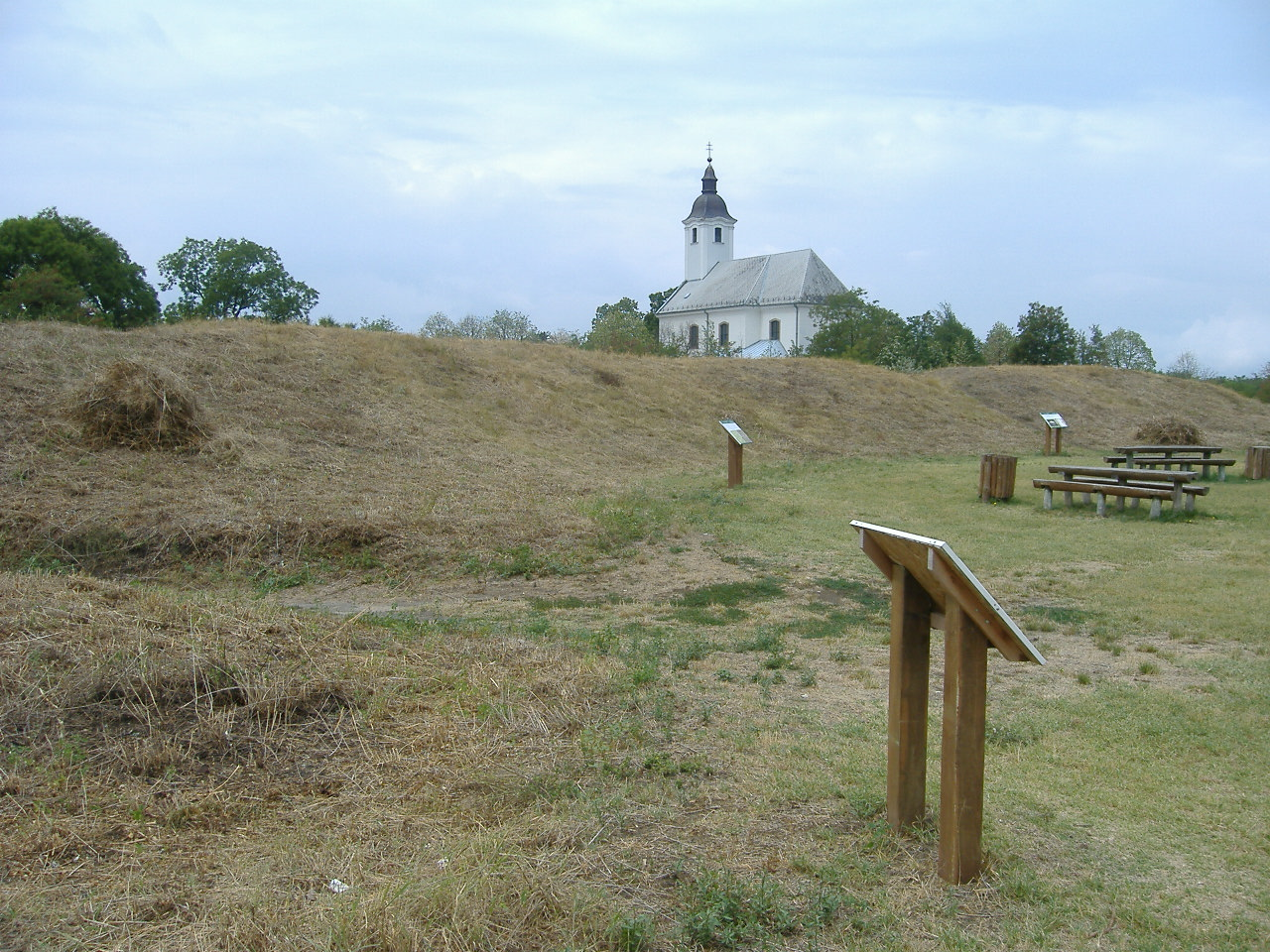
Remains of the medieval earthwork

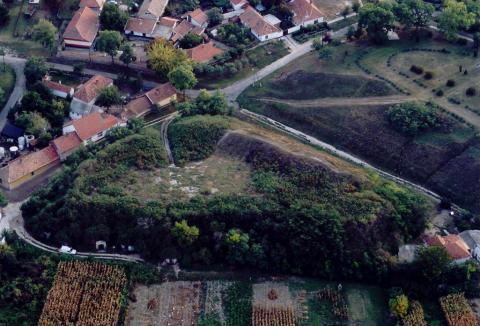
Aerial photo of the earthwork

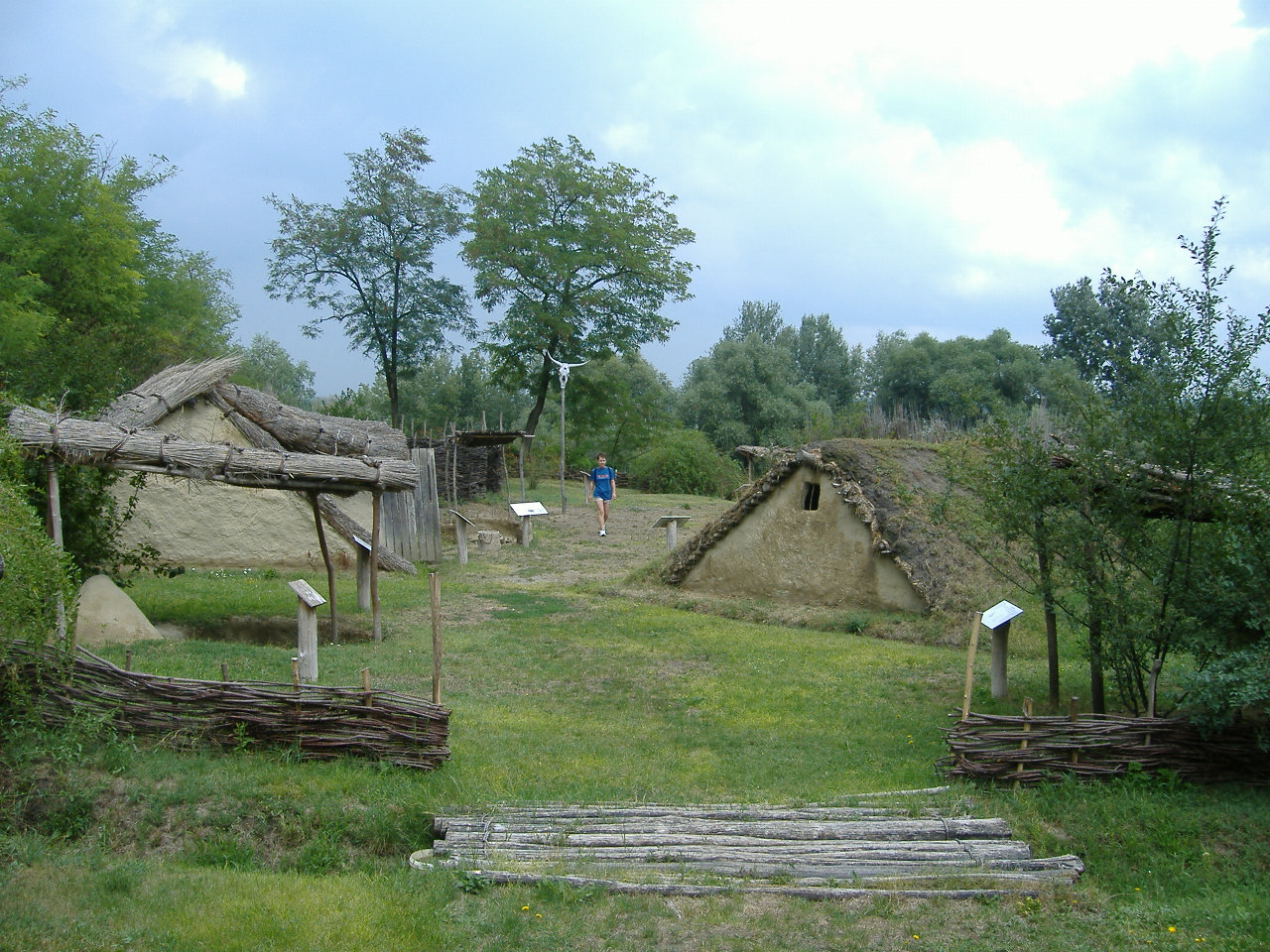
The reconstructed Árpád-era village (Skanzen)

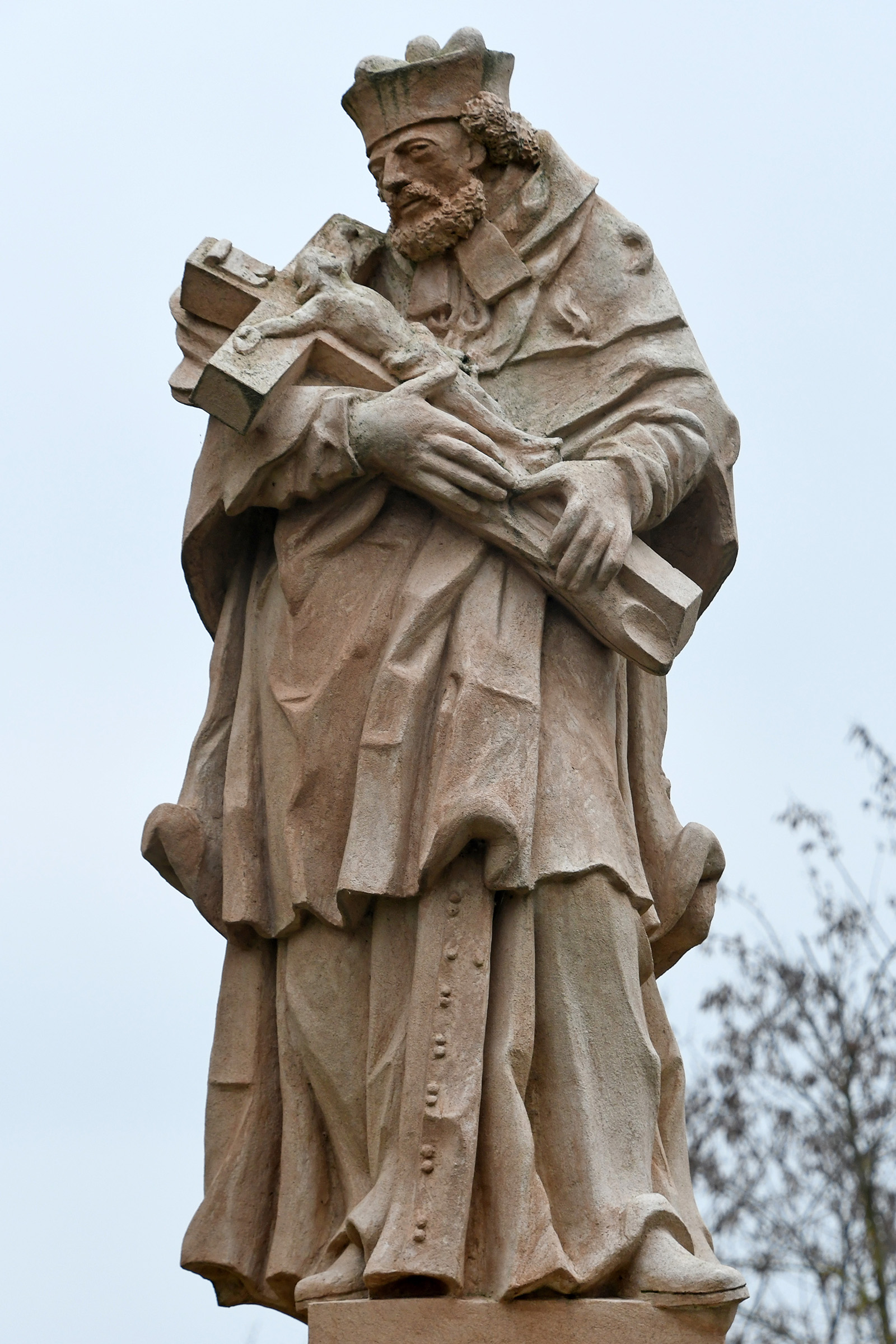
Statue of John of Nepomuk

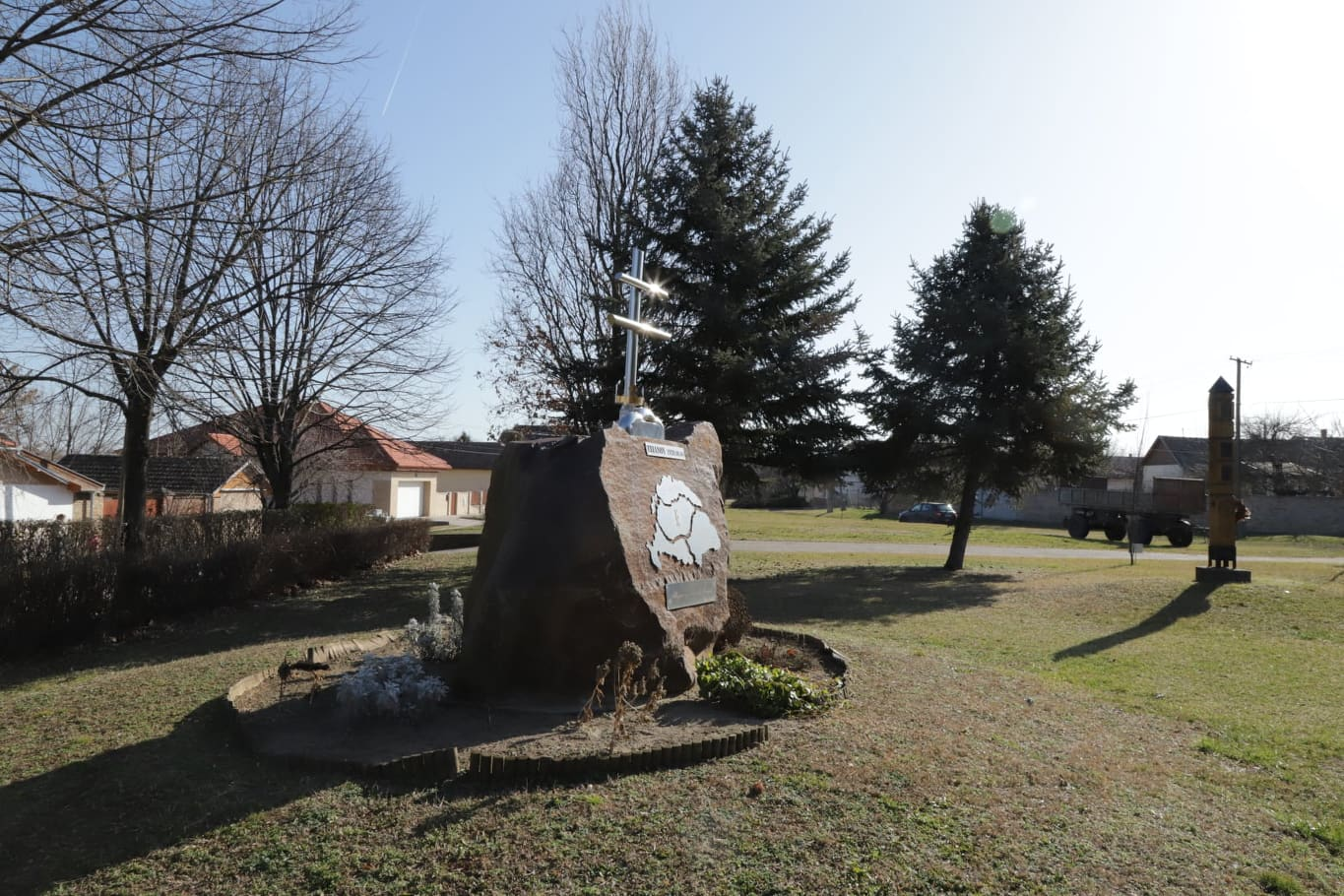
Trianon Monument in Tiszaalpár

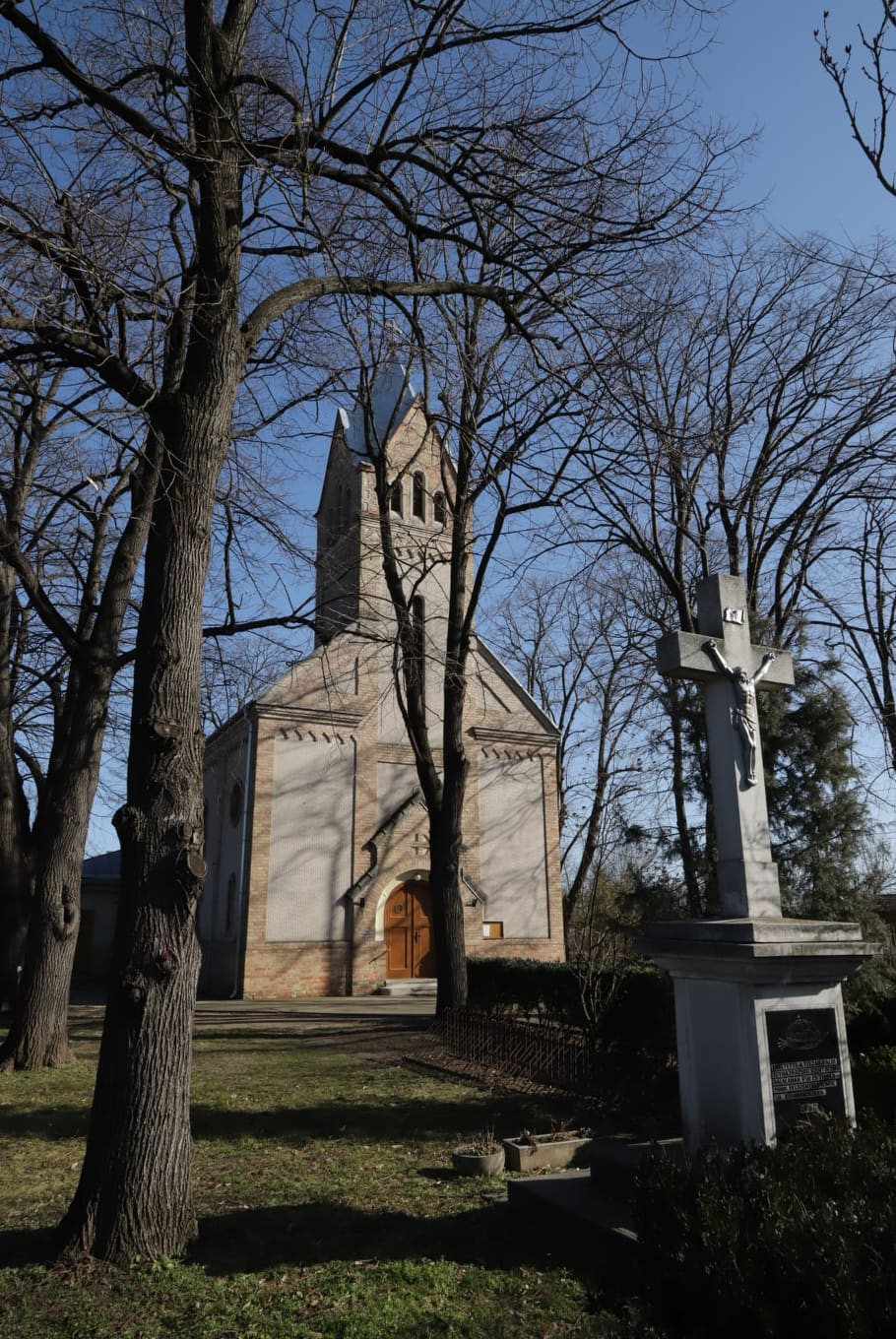
Saint Stephen Roman Catholic Church

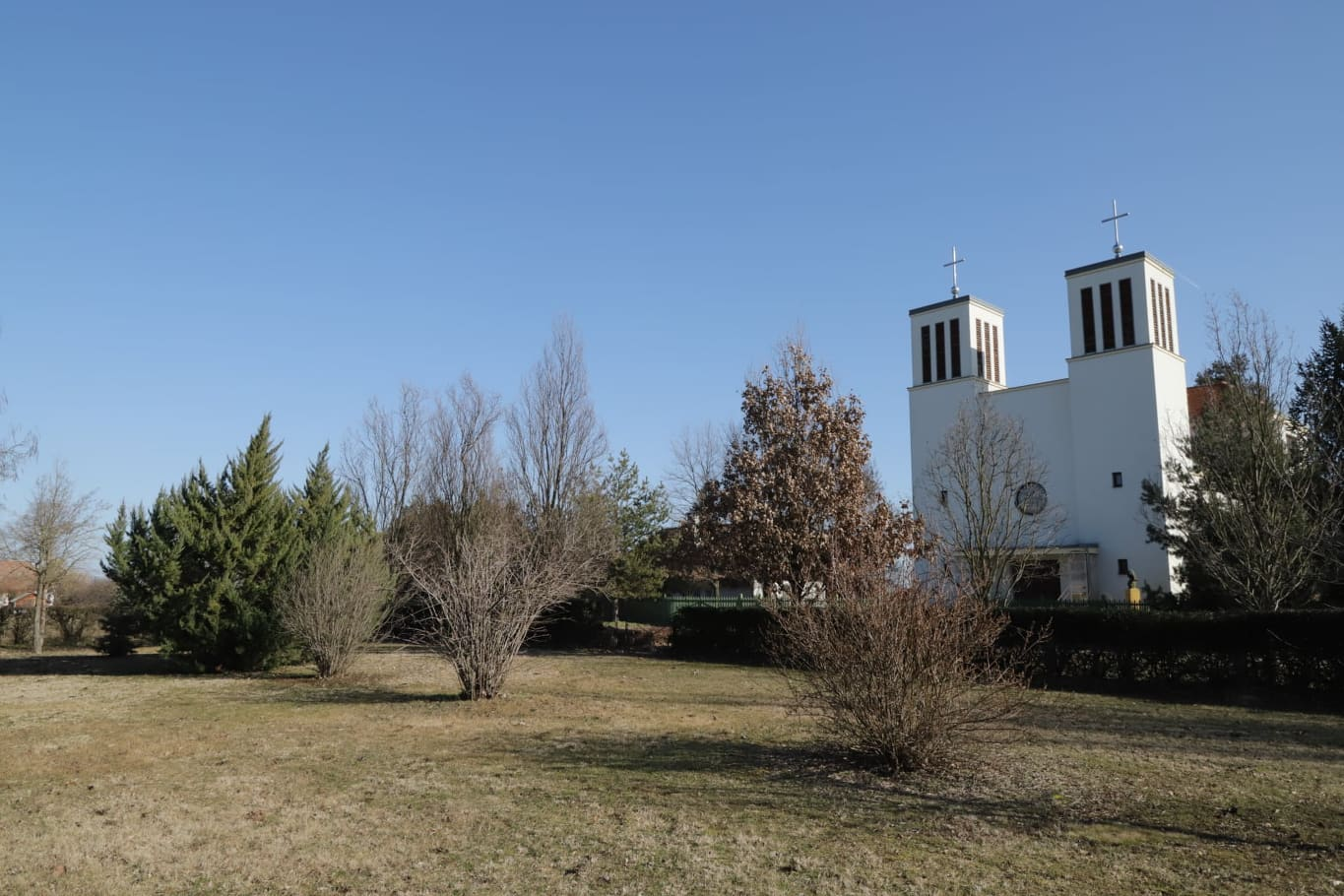
The convent church of the Sisters of Saint Benedict

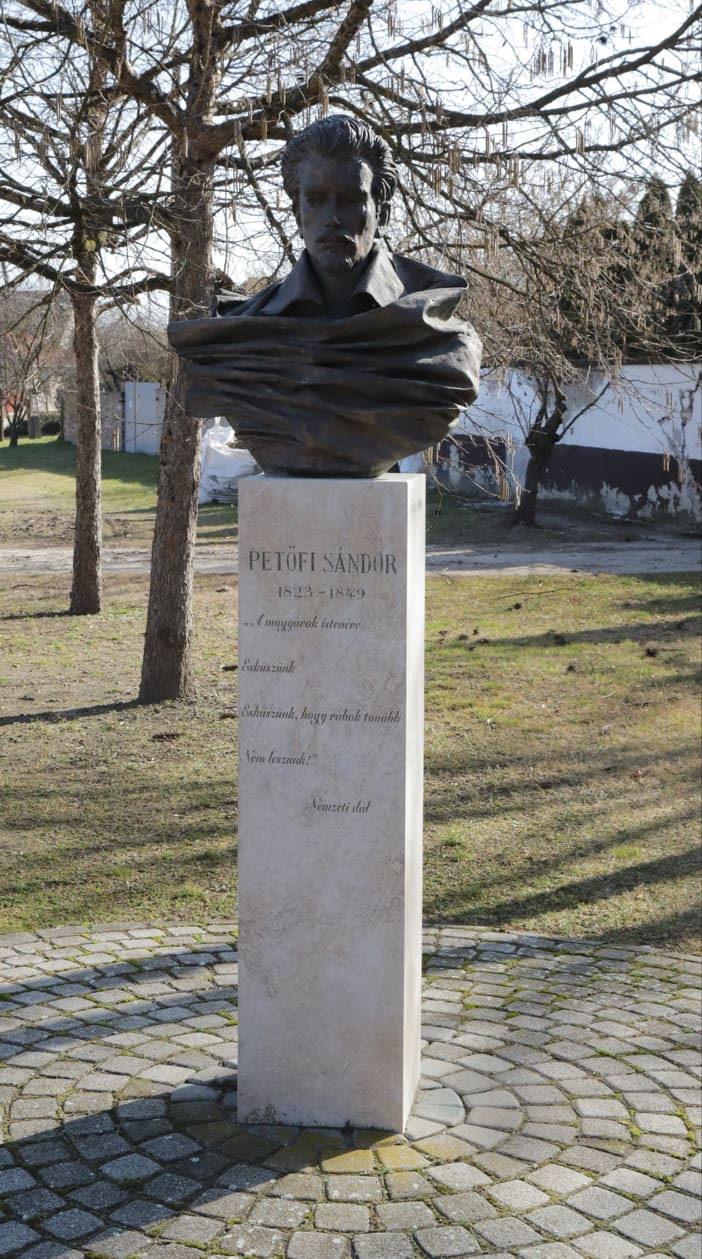
Statue of Sándor Petőfi

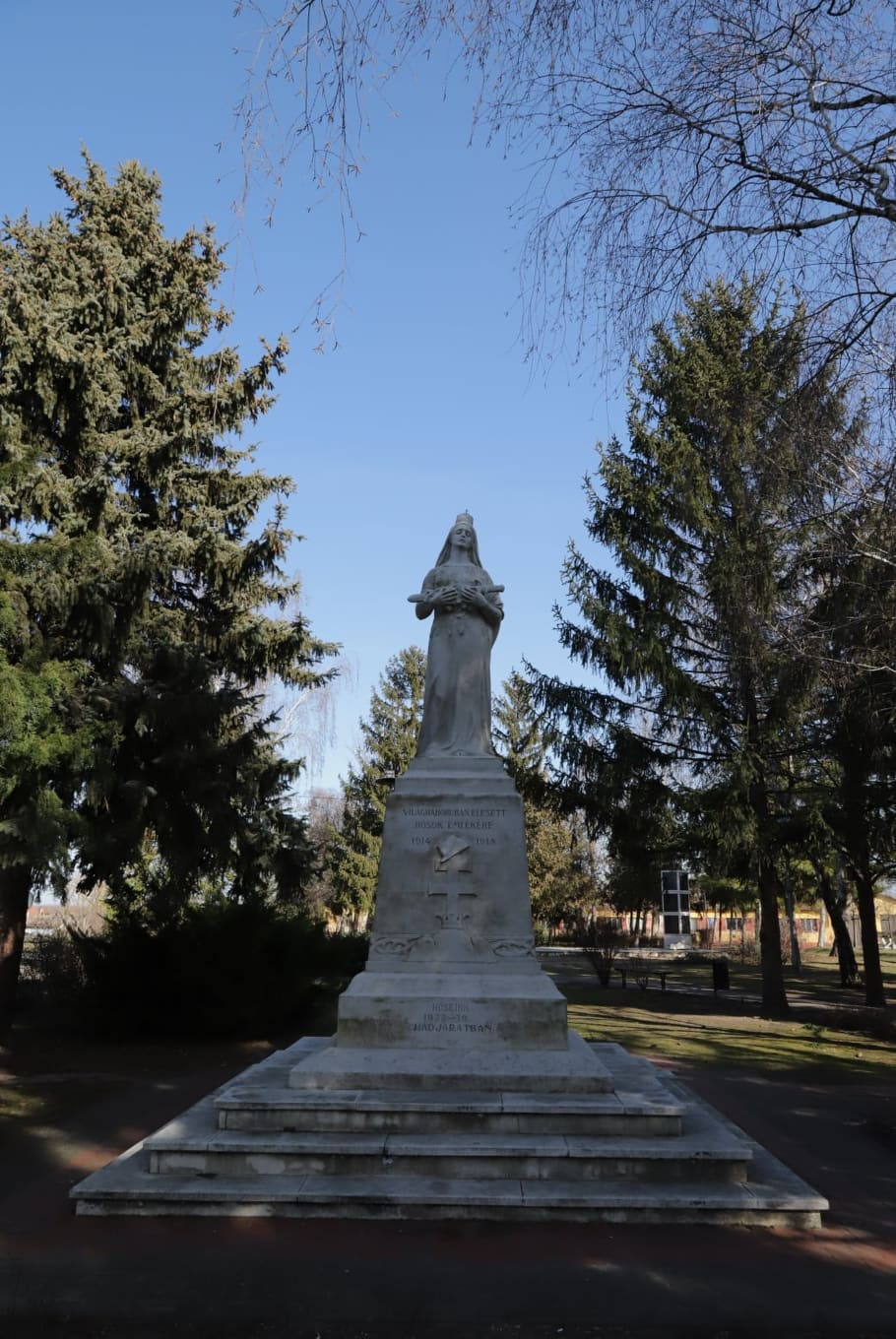
World War I Memorial

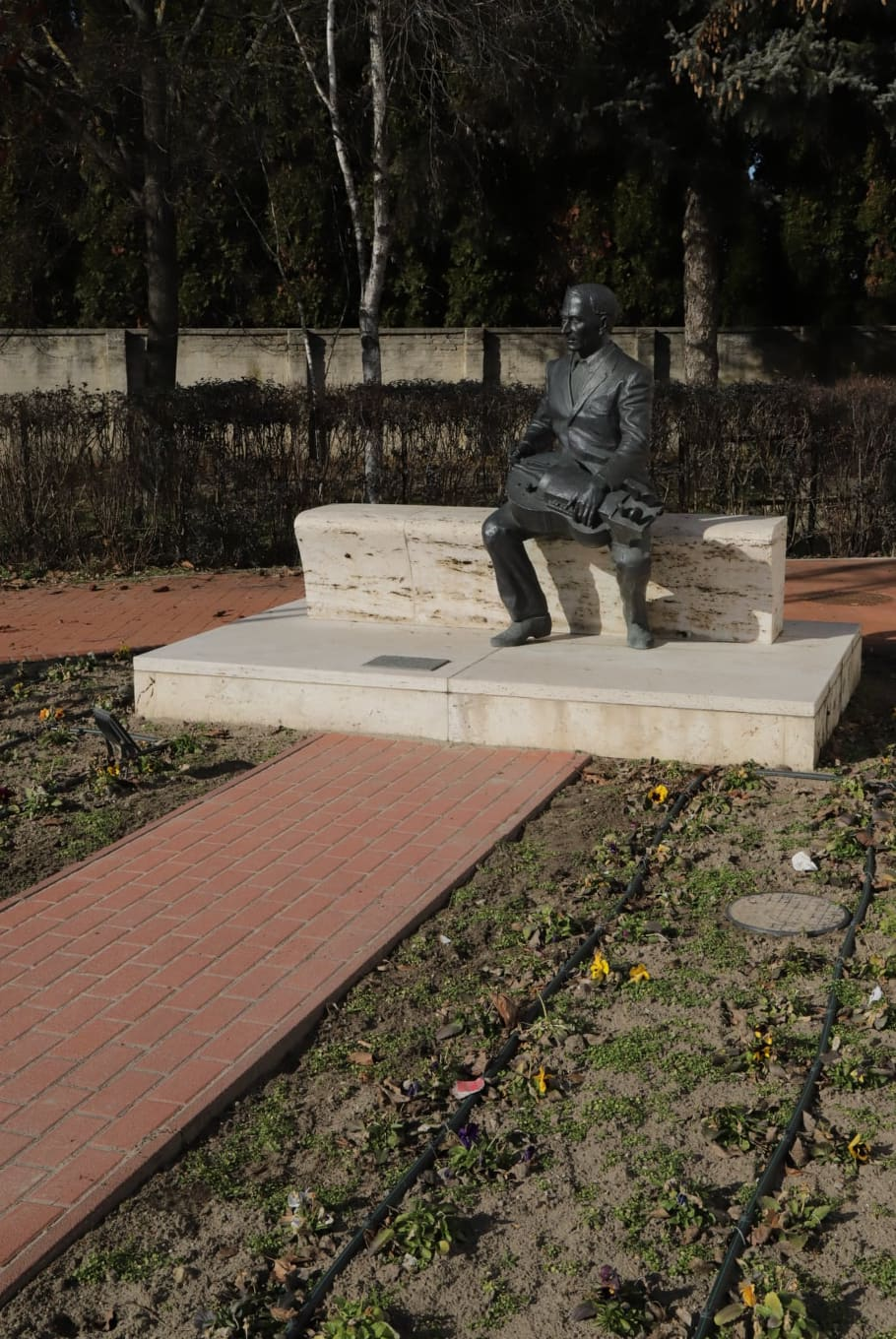
Statue of local folk artist Mihály Bársony

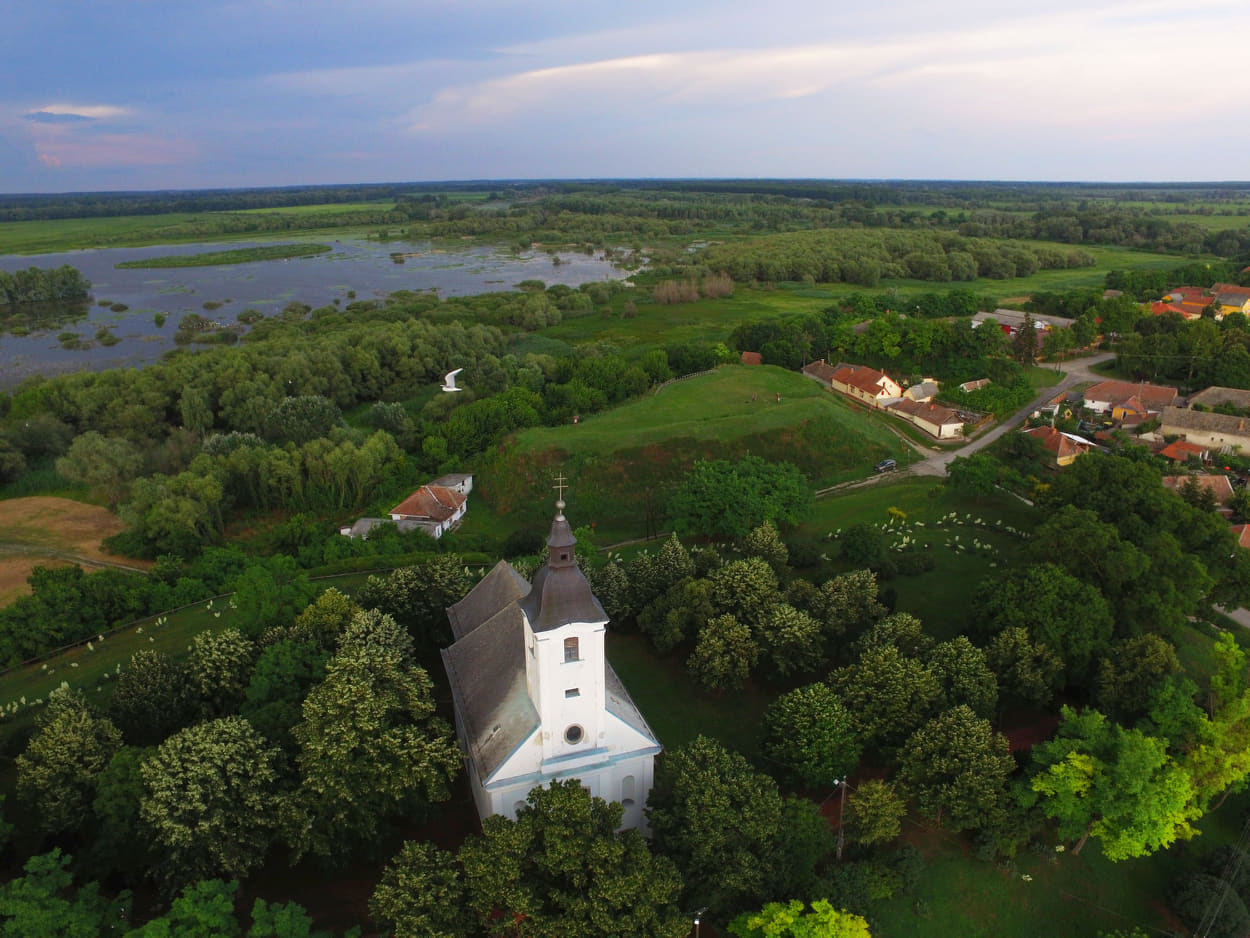
Church of Our Lady of Good Counsel

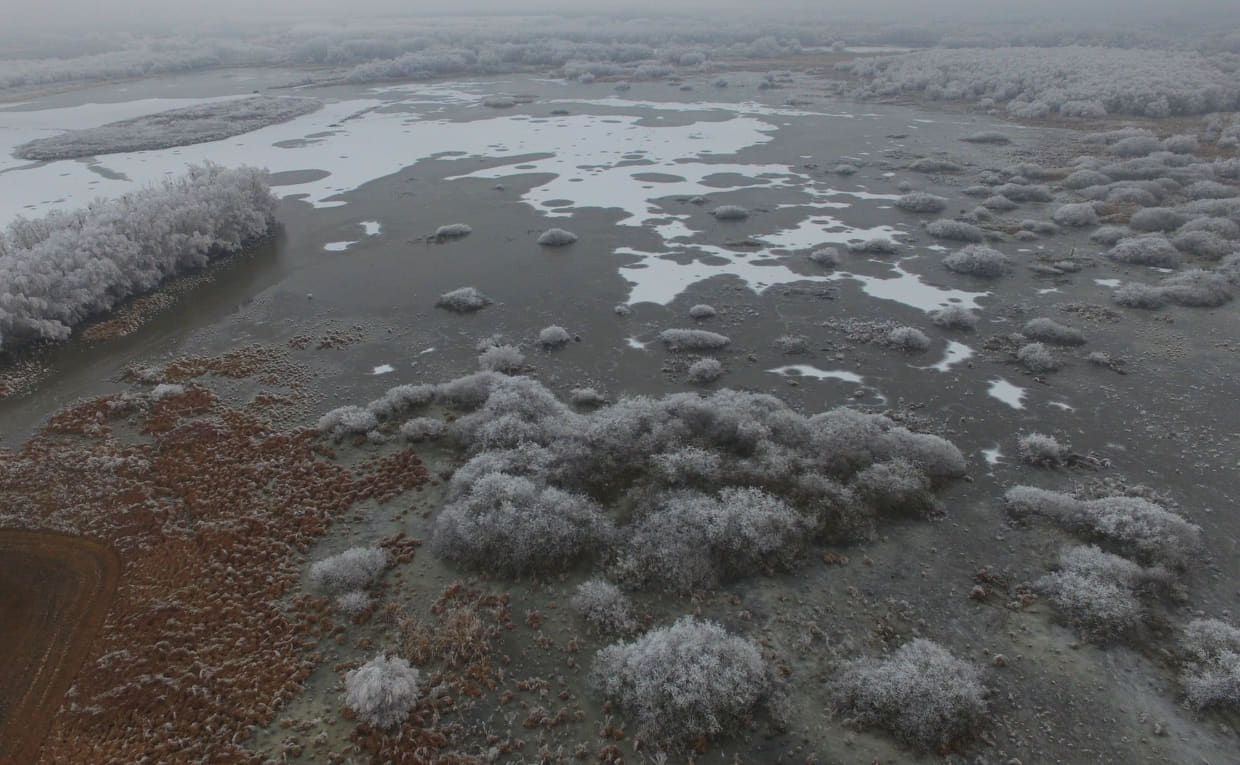
Lake "Nagy-tó" in winter

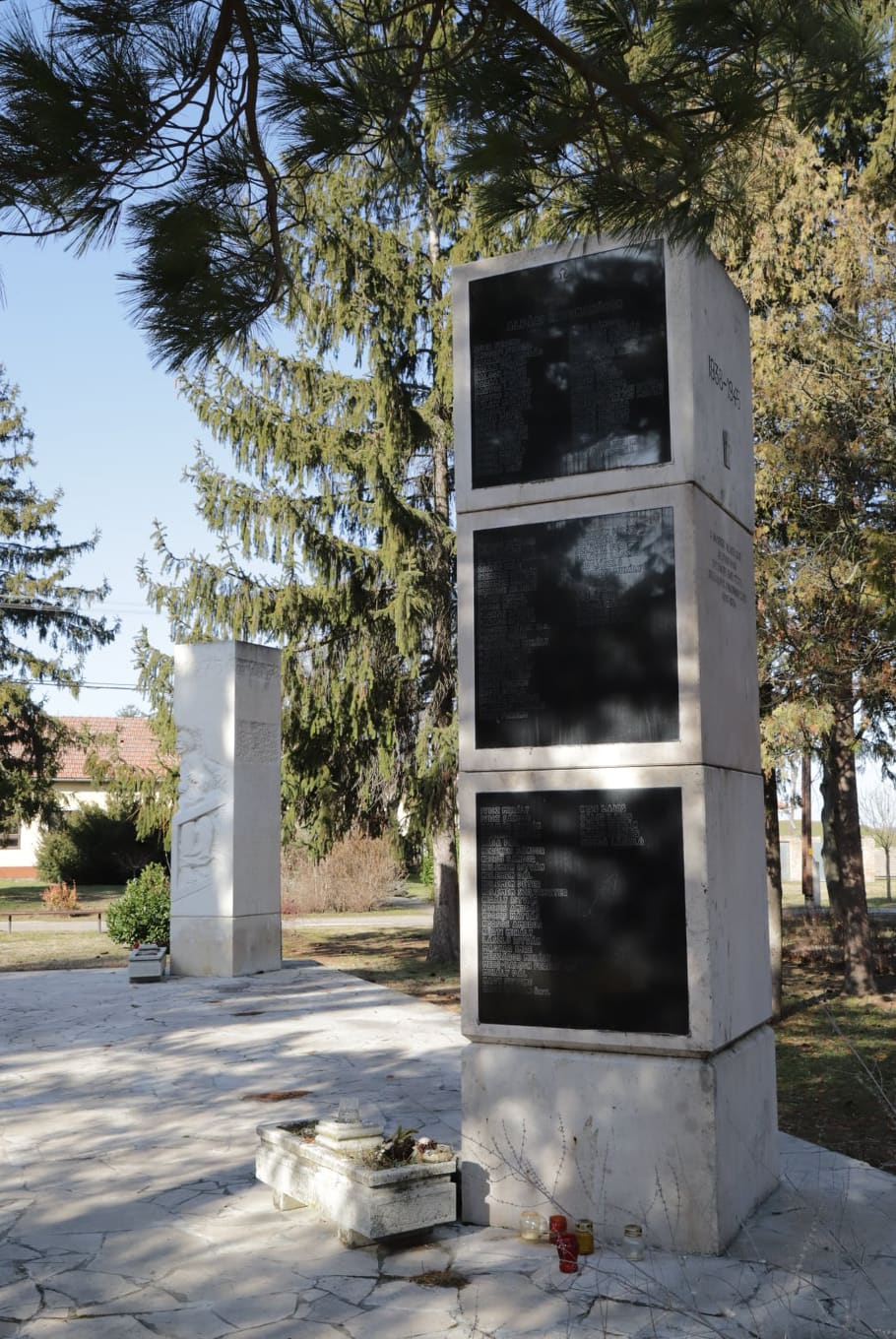
900-year anniversary and World War II Memorial

== Sport ==
Football is the most popular sport in Tiszaalpár; the local team, Tiszaalpár Sports Club (ASE), competes in the regional division (Vármegyei III). In addition to football, Tiszaalpár Sports Club also has a handball and boxing department.

== Sources ==
- Samu Borovszky: Pest-Pilis-Solt vármegye
- Kristóf Keglevich (2012): A garamszentbenedeki apátság története az Árpád- és az Anjou-korban (1075-1403). Szeged, p. 177.
