= Anonymus =

Anonymus is the Latin spelling of anonymous, traditionally used by scholars in the humanities for any ancient writer whose name is not known, or to a manuscript of their work. Such writers have left valuable historical or literary records through the ages.

Anonymus may also refer to:

== Authors ==
- Two separate writers both known as Anonymus Valesianus or Anonymus Valesii, authors of two texts, late fifth century and ca. 527 of a vita of Constantine and a fragmentary chronicle, the Excerpta Valesiana
- The Anonymus of Ravenna (Anonymus Ravennatis), author of the Ravenna Cosmography, a Late Antique geographical work
- The Anonymus (notary of King Béla III of Hungary) of the Gesta Hungarorum, the author of a medieval work on the history of Hungary
- Gallus Anonymus, early 12th century, the author of the first history of Poland
- The Anonymus of Turin (often referred to by the Italian Anonimo di Torino), writer of a catalogue of churches of Rome
- The Anonymus Banduri, the author of the Πάτρια Κωνσταντινοπόλεως, a 10th‑century topography of Constantinople
- The Anonymus de Rebus Bellicis, author of a Late Antique work on warfare
- The Anonymus Ανταττικιστης (the Anti-Atticist Anonymus), an opponent of Phrynichus Arabius, valuable for the study of ancient Greek vocabulary
- The Anonymus Seguerianus, of the 3rd century, whose work is useful for the study of 1st century rhetoric
- The Anonymus Gestorum Francorum, author of the Gesta Francorum, an account of the First Crusade
- The Anonymus of York (or The Norman Anonymous), author of an 11th‑century religious/political tract on the right of kings
- The Anonymus of Dubrovnik, author of 15th‑century Annals of that city
- Anonymus I and Anonymus II, the authors of commentaries on the Phaenomena of Aratus

== Manuscript copyists ==
- Sometimes Anonymus refers not to an author, but to a manuscript copyist. Few manuscripts were signed, so the list might be extended almost indefinitely, but some manuscripts can be said to have transferred some of their importance to the copyist; in the manuscript tradition of Phaedrus, for example, it is common to refer to the Anonymus Nilanti, a 13th-century copyist named after the scholar who edited him in 1709.
- An Anonymus de antiquitate Urbis, stated by Christian Hülsen to be a copyist of the Roma Instaurata of Flavio Biondo

== Other ==
- Anonymus (band), a Quebec Thrash metal band
- Anonymus, the earliest ancestor of fictional character Ijon Tichy
- Anonymus and Anonymus II, instrumentals by Focus from, respectively, In and Out of Focus and Focus 3

== See also ==
- Anon (disambiguation)
- Anonymous (disambiguation)
