= Anom (disambiguation) =

Anom or ANOM may refer to:

- ANOM , a transnational law enforcement sting operation revealed in 2021
- Archives nationales d'outre-mer, a branch of the Archives Nationales of France
- Maung Anom F.C., Indonesian football club
- Agung Anom (c. 1690–1722), monarch of the Balinese Kingdom of Mengwi

== See also ==
- Amon (disambiguation)
- Anon (disambiguation)
- The Anome, 1973 science fiction novel by American writer Jack Vance
