= Tiszakécske District =

Tiszakécske District Tiszakécskei járás
- Districts of Hungary
- Coat of arms

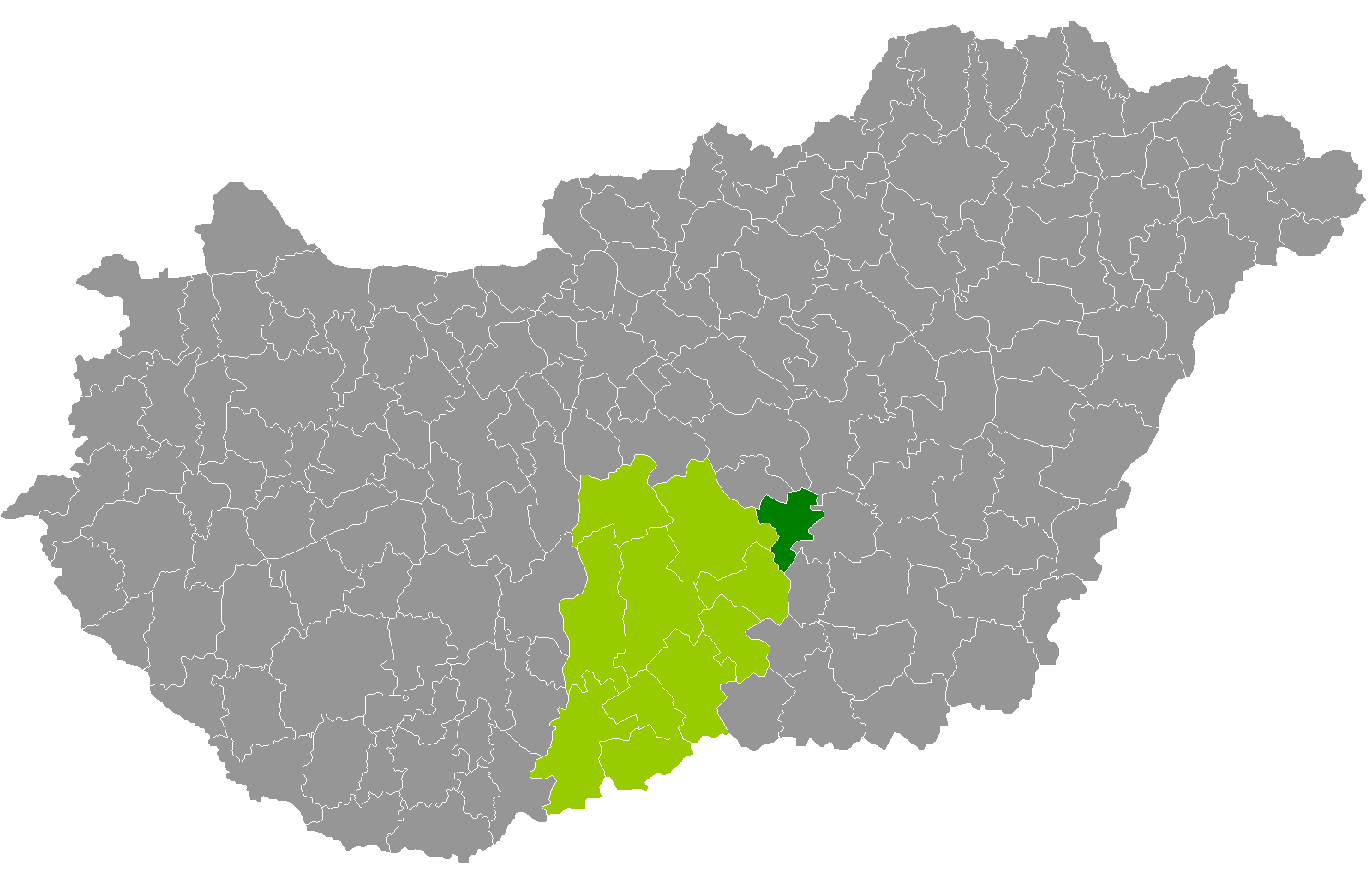
- Tiszakécske District within Hungary and Bács-Kiskun County.
- Coordinates: 46.94°N 20.10°E
- Country: Hungary
- County: Bács-Kiskun
- District seat: Tiszakécske

Area
  - Total: 405.99 km^{2} (156.75 sq mi)
  - Rank: 11th in Bács-Kiskun

Population (2011 census)
  - Total: 23,582
  - Rank: 8th in Bács-Kiskun
  - Density: 58/km^{2} (150/sq mi)

Tiszakécske (Hungarian: Tiszakécskei járás) is a district in north-eastern part of Bács-Kiskun County. Tiszakécske is also the name of the town where the district seat is found. The district is located in the Southern Great Plain Statistical Region.

== Geography ==
Tiszakécske District borders with Nagykőrös District, Cegléd District (Pest County) and Szolnok District (Jász-Nagykun-Szolnok County) to the north, Kunszentmárton District (Jász-Nagykun-Szolnok County) to the east, Csongrád District (Csongrád County) to the southeast, Kiskunfélegyháza District to the southwest, Kecskemét District to the west. The number of the inhabited places in Tiszakécske District is 5.

== Municipalities ==
The district has 1 town, 2 large villages and 2 villages. (ordered by population, as of 1 January 2012)

- Lakitelek (4,452)
- Szentkirály (1,940)
- Tiszaalpár (4,907)
- **Tiszakécske** (11,237) – district seat
- Tiszaug (899)

The bolded municipality is city, italics municipalities are large villages.

== Demographics ==
Religion in Tiszakécske District (2011 census)
1. Catholic Church (51.7%)
2. Greek Catholicism (0.20%)
3. Calvinism (10.1%)
4. Lutheranism (0.20%)
5. Other religions (1.10%)
6. Non-religious (13.3%)
7. Atheists (0.70%)
8. Undeclared (22.7%)

In 2011, it had a population of 23,582 and the population density was 58/km^{2}.

Year	County population	Change
2011	23,582	n/a

=== Ethnicity ===
Besides the Hungarian majority, the main minorities are the Roma (approx. 450), German (200) and Romanian (100).

Total population (2011 census): 23,582
Ethnic groups (2011 census): Identified themselves: 21,882 persons:

- Hungarians: 20,957 (95.77%)
- Gypsies: 429 (1.96%)
- Others and indefinable: 496 (2.27%)

Approx. 1,500 persons in Tiszakécske District did not declare their ethnic group at the 2011 census.

=== Religion ===
Religious adherence in the county according to 2011 census:

- Catholic – 12,252 (Roman Catholic – 12,200; Greek Catholic – 50);
- Reformed – 2,387;
- Evangelical – 52;
- other religions – 258;
- Non-religious – 3,146;
- Atheism – 173;
- Undeclared – 5,314.

== Gallery ==
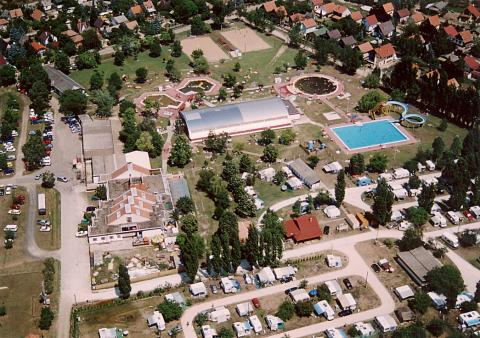
Tiszakécske, the district seat

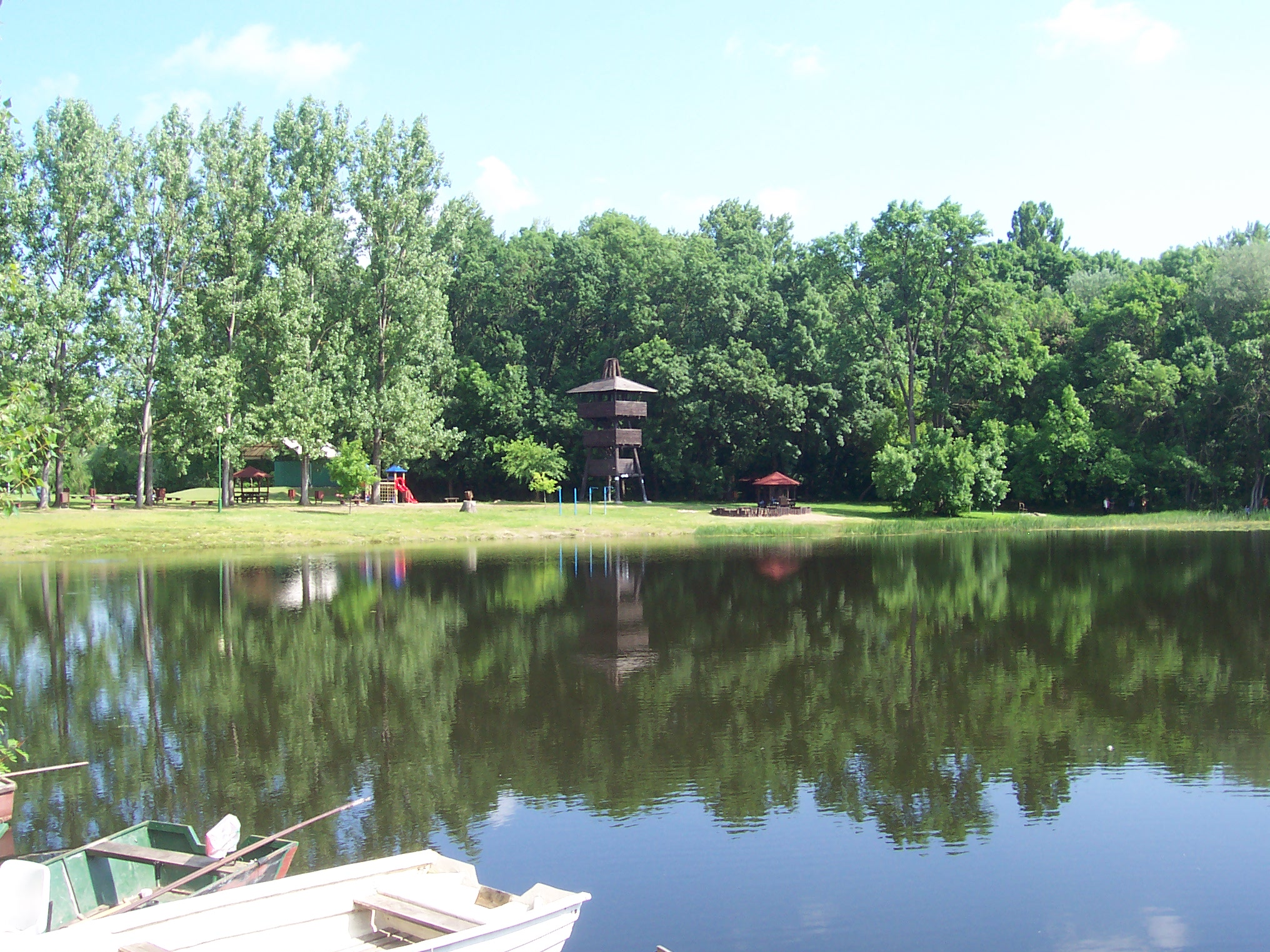
Tőserdő near Lakitelek

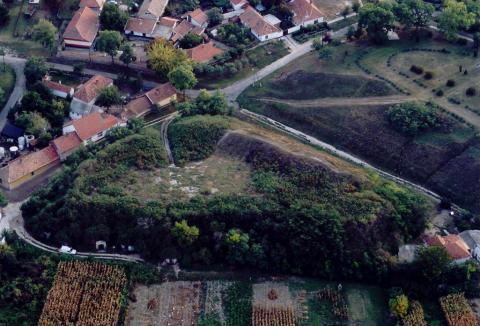
Earthfort of Tiszaalpár

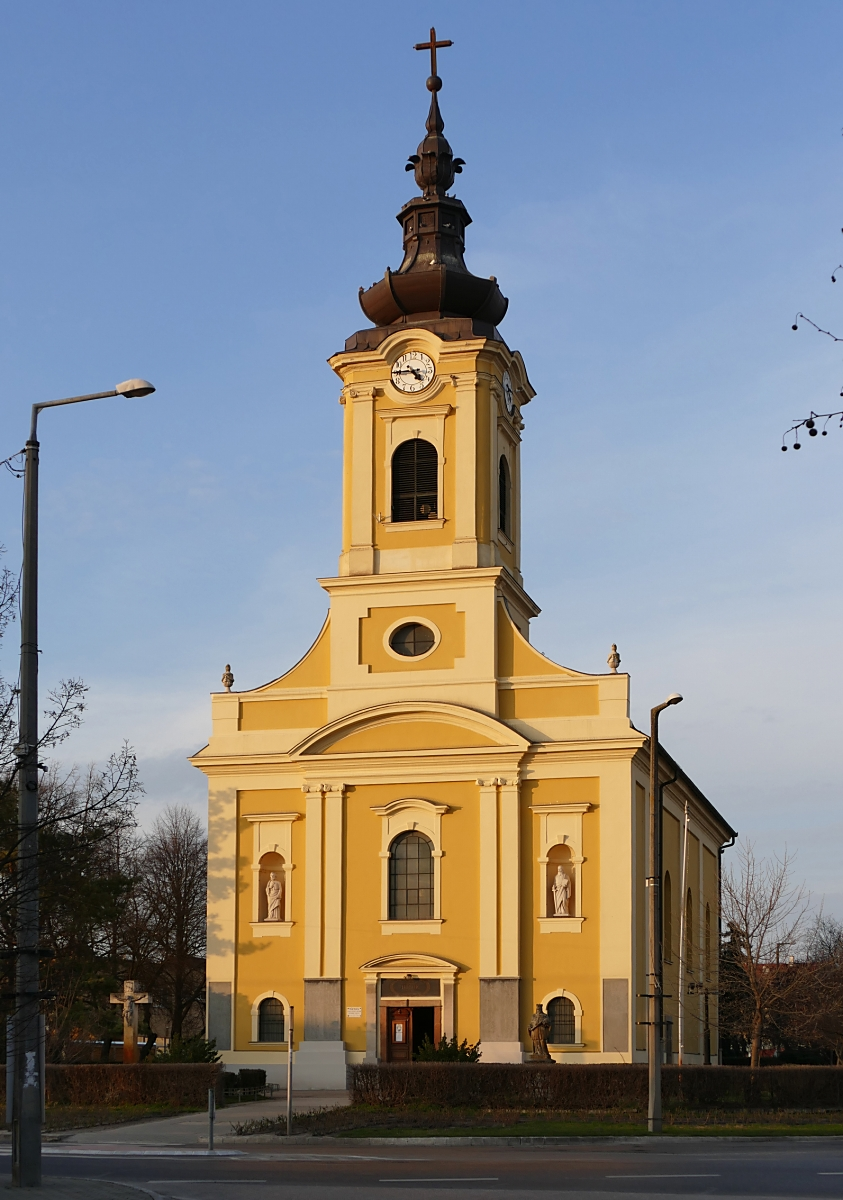
Holy Trinity Church in Tiszakécske

== See also ==
- List of cities and towns of Hungary
