= ANO =

Ano or ANO may refer to:

- Anō, Mie, Japan, a town
- Anō Station, various railway stations in Japan
- ANO 2011, a Czech political party
- Abu Nidal Organization (or Fatah – Revolutionary Council), a Palestinian nationalist militant group
- Akhurian River or Ano Jur, in the South Caucasus
- Alliance of the New Citizen, a Slovak political party
- Anoctamins or ANOs, a calcium-activated chloride channel family
- Arkansas Nuclear One, a nuclear power plant near Russellville, Arkansas
- "Un Año", a 2019 song of Sebastian Yatra and Reik

== People ==
- A. N. Other, a placeholder name, or a pseudonym used by a person wishing to be anonymous
- Ano, wife of Jeroboam, according to the Septuagint
- Ano (singer) (active since 2013), Japanese singer
- Ano Pala, Papua New Guinean politician
- Eduardo Año (born 1961), head of the Philippine Army, politician
- Mahiro Ano (born 2003), Japanese footballer
- María Añó (born 2002), Spanish rhythmic gymnast
- Núria Añó (born 1973), Catalan writer

== See also ==
- Anno (disambiguation)
- Nano (disambiguation)
