= Anno =

Anno may refer to:

== People ==
- Anno of Saint Gall (died 954), Anti-Abbot of St. Gall
- Anno II (Archbishop of Cologne) (c. 1010–1075), Archbishop of Cologne from 1056 to 1075
- Anno (surname)
- Anno Birkin (1980–2001), English musician
- Hideaki Anno (1960-), Anime director

== Arts and media ==
- Anno (video game series)
- Anno Dracula series, fantasy novels by Kim Newman
- Anno's Journey, a series of children's books by Mitsumasa Anno

== Other ==
- Anno, Ivory Coast, a settlement in Lagunes District
- Anno (Austrian Newspapers Online), a digitisation initiative of the Austrian National Library
- Anno, a form of the Latin noun annum
  - Anno Hegirae, in the Islamic calendar, ("in the year of the Hijra"), abbreviated as AH or H
  - Anno Domini ("in the year of (Our) Lord"), abbreviated as AD, an epoch based on the traditionally-reckoned year of the conception or birth of Jesus of Nazareth
  - Anno Mundi ("in the year of the world"), abbreviated AM, a Calendar era counting from the creation of the world
- Quadragesimo anno, an encyclical by Pope Pius XI, issued 15 May 1931

== See also ==
- Ano (disambiguation)
- Annon
- Paul Di'Anno (born 1958, as Paul Andrews), vocalist in the band Iron Maiden
