= Anonymous =

Anonymous most often refers to:

- Anonymity, the state of an individual's identity, or personally identifiable information, being publicly unknown
  - Anonymous work, a work of art or literature that has an unnamed or unknown creator or author
- Anonymity (social choice), a property of a voting rule, saying that it does not discriminate apriori between voters
- Anonymous (hacker group), the collective name of loosely affiliated individuals who participate in hacktivism

Anonymous may also refer to:

== Film and television ==
- "Anonymous" (Australian Playhouse), an Australian television play
- Anonymous (film), a 2011 period drama film directed by Roland Emmerich
- Anonymous (TV series), a 2006 Irish television show
- "Anonymous" (CSI), a 2000 episode of CSI: Crime Scene Investigation
- "Anonymous" (FBI: Most Wanted), a 2000 episode of FBI: Most Wanted
- "Anonymous" (NCIS: Los Angeles), a 2010 episode of NCIS: Los Angeles
- Hacker (film), a 2016 crime thriller, directed by Akan Satayev, released in theaters as Anonymous

== Music ==
- Anonymous (band), an Andorran band

=== Albums ===
- Anonymous (Blackbear album) (2019)
- Anonymous (Stray from the Path album) (2013)
- Anonymous (Tomahawk album) (2007)
- Anonymous, a 2009 album by Tyske Ludder
- Anonymous (soundtrack), the soundtrack of the 2011 film

=== Songs ===
- "Anonymous" (song), by Bobby Valentino (2007)
- "Anonymous", a song by Sleater-Kinney from the 1996 album Call the Doctor
- "Anonymous", a song by Spacehog from the 1998 album The Chinese Album
- "Anonymous", a song by Three Days Grace from Transit of Venus (2012)
- "A.N.O.N.Y.M.O.U.S.", a song by Reks from The Greatest X (2016)

== People ==
- Rodney Anonymous (born 1963), Philadelphia musician and humorist
- Joe Klein or Anonymous (born 1946), author of Primary Colors: A Novel of Politics
- Jayson Sherlock or Anonymous (born 1969), Christian metal musician from Australia
- Miles Taylor (security expert), former Donald Trump administration staffer, who wrote an op-ed and a book under the pen name "Anonymous"

== Other uses ==
- Anonymous (statue), a statue in City Park, Budapest, Hungary
- Anon(ymous), a 2006 play by Naomi Iizuka

== See also ==
- Anon (disambiguation), for the abbreviation
- Anonymus (disambiguation)
- Anonymous IV, a 13th-century English student of medieval music theory
- Anonymous 4, a female a cappella quartet
- Anonymouse (collective), an anonymous Swedish artists collective
- Nomen nescio, used to signify an anonymous or non-specific person
