= Zoltán Kásás =

Hungarian water polo player

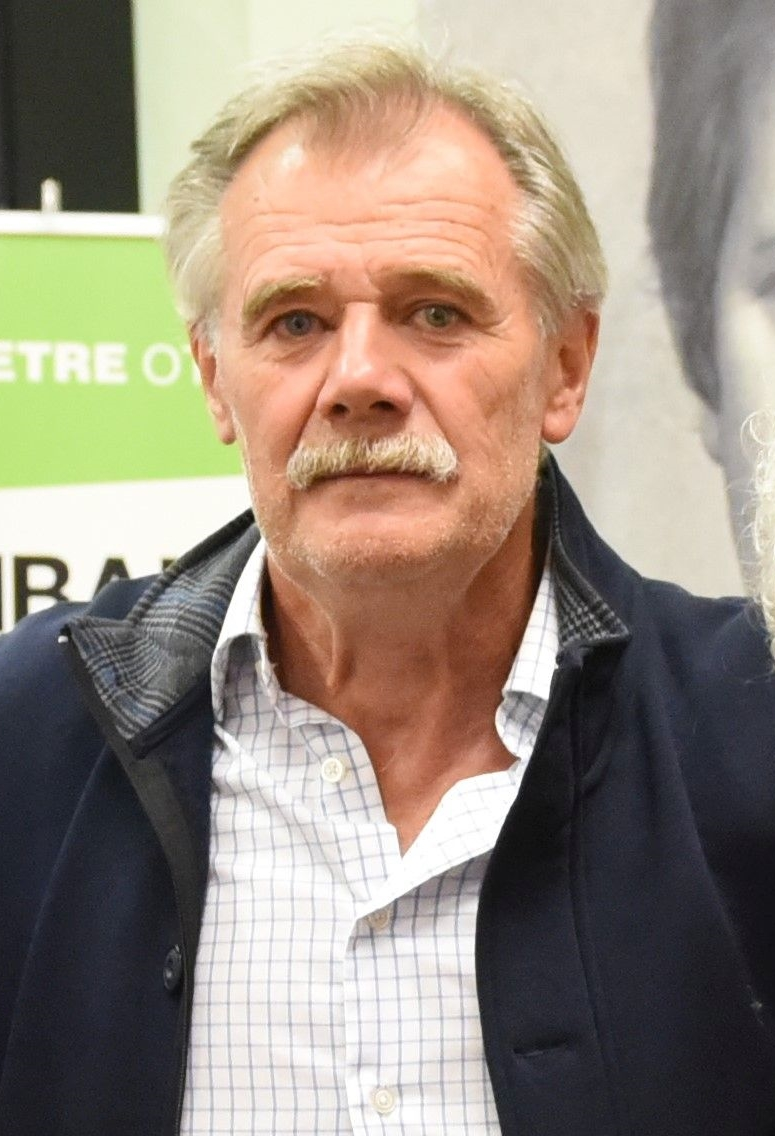

Personal information
- Born: 15 September 1946 (age 79) Alpár, Hungary
- Height: 190 cm (6 ft 3 in)

Sport
- Sport: Water polo
Medal record
Representing Hungary
Olympic Games
Silver medal – second place	1972 Munich	Team
World Championships
Gold medal – first place	1973 Belgrade	Team
European Championships
Gold medal – first place	1974 Vienna	Team
Silver medal – second place	1970 Barcelona	Team

Zoltán Kásás (born 15 September 1946 in Alpár) is a Hungarian former water polo player who competed in the 1972 Summer Olympics.

== See also ==
- List of Olympic medalists in water polo (men)
- List of world champions in men's water polo
- List of World Aquatics Championships medalists in water polo
