= Ernő Kovács =

Hungarian politician

Member of the National Assembly
- In office 14 May 2010 – 5 May 2014

Personal details
- Born: 2 February 1959 (age 67) Kecskemét, Hungary
- Party: Fidesz
- Profession: mechanical technician

Ernő Kovács (born 2 February 1959) is a Hungarian mechanical technician and politician, member of the National Assembly (MP) from Fidesz Bács-Kiskun County Regional List between 2010 and 2014. Kovács was a member of the Committee on Employment and Labour since 14 May 2010.

He served as Mayor of Tiszakécske from 1998 to 2014. Kovács was appointed Director of the Bács-Kiskun County Government Office in July 2014, replacing János Kerényi.
