= Anno (surname) =

Anno (written: 庵野, 安野 or 阿武) or Annō (written: 案納) is a Japanese surname. Notable people with the surname include:

- Anton Anno (1838–1893), German theatre actor, theatre director, and playwright
- Hideaki Anno (庵野 秀明; born 1960), Japanese animation and video director
- Masami Anno (案納 正美), Japanese animation producer and director
- Mitsumasa Anno (安野 光雅; 1926–2020), Japanese writer and artist
- Moyoco Anno (安野 モヨコ; born 1971), Japanese manga artist and wife of Hideaki Anno.
- Noriko Anno (阿武 教子; born 1976), Japanese judoka
- Takahiro Anno (安野 貴博; born 1990), Japanese politician and founder of Team Mirai
