= Mihály Bársony =

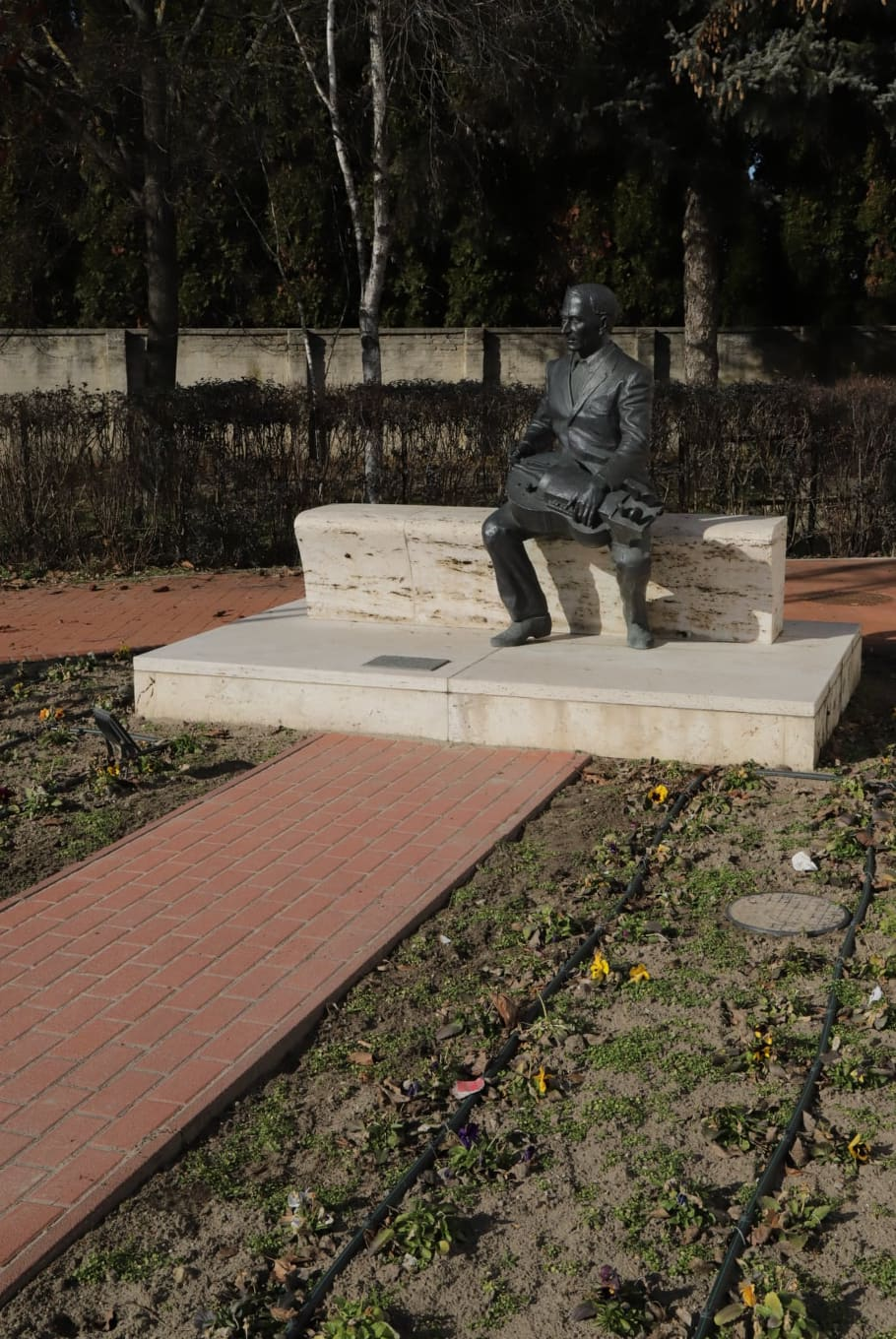
- Statue of Mihály Bársony in Tiszaalpár

Background information
- Born: September 2, 1915; Tiszaújfalu, Austria-Hungary
- Died: January 4, 1989 (aged 73) Tiszaalpár, Hungarian People's Republic
- Genre: Hungarian folk music
- Occupations: Luthier, folk musician
- Instruments: Hurdy-gurdy, clarinet, zither
- Years active: 1934–1989

Mihály Bársony (2 September 1915 – 4 January 1989) was a Hungarian folk musician and luthier from the Southern Great Plain region, renowned as a hurdy-gurdy, clarinet, and zither player. He was awarded the honorary title of Master of Folk Art in 1968 and is considered one of the most influential figures in preserving and reviving the hurdy-gurdy tradition in Hungary. French ethnomusicologist Claude Flagel praised him as a "peasant genius."

== Early life ==
Bársony was born on a farmstead in Tiszaújfalu (now part of Tiszaalpár), as the seventh children in a middle-peasant family. He spent his youth in the local area, working in agriculture while displaying exceptional skill in woodworking and mechanical crafts; he built doors, windows, ovens, horse-drawn sleighs, and barrels, and repaired clocks.

In 1934, at the age of 19, Bársony bought his first heavily damaged hurdy-gurdy in a bag for 5 pengő. He repaired the instrument himself and used it to learn to play. By 1935, he had constructed his first original hurdy-gurdy, carrying on the regional instrument-making tradition of nearby Szentes. Although basic in design, its sound quality surpassed that of the instrument he had purchased.

== Career and music revival ==
From the 1930s onward, Bársony toured the surrounding countryside with his older brother József, performing as a hurdy-gurdy and clarinet duo at local weddings, name-day celebrations, corn-husking gatherings, and farmstead festivities. He also began making zithers and hurdy-gurdies for local musicians.

Operating from his rural farmstead without electricity, Bársony worked with precision using hand tools, templates, and jigs that he created himself. Over his lifetime, he constructed 213 hurdy-gurdies and several hundred zithers, documenting each customer and sale. His instruments featured a characteristic double melodic string layout, painted decorations, and precise curved body shapes, establishing what scholars now categorize as the "Bársony-type" hurdy-gurdy.

Although the use of the hurdy-gurdy among the Great Plain peasantry declined sharply in the 1950s, Bársony maintained interest in the instrument. By the late 1960s and early 1970s, ethnomusicologists, researchers, and young musicians from the Hungarian táncház revival movement rediscovered Bársony. Leading folk ensembles of the era - including Ferenc Sebő, Muzsikás - visited his farmstead to order instruments and learn his playing technique.

== Legacy ==
Bársony was awarded the title of Master of Folk Art (Népművészet Mestere) in 1968. In 1996, he was posthumously named an honorary citizen of Tiszaalpár.

Following his death in 1989, his tools, patterns, and unfinished instruments were passed to his student, luthier Béla Szerényi. Bársony's preserved homestead and workshop represent the only fully intact traditional peasant instrument-making workshop in Hungary.

His memory is preserved through a local folk ensemble named in his honor and the annual Bársonyfest (Bársony Mihály Tekerőlantos Találkozó/Bársonyfeszt), held around Saint Michael's Day in Tiszaalpár.

== Honors and awards ==
- Master of Folk Art (1968)
- Honorary Citizen of Tiszaalpár (posthumous, 1996)

== Sound recordings ==
- Bársony Mihály Archív Felvételei Archive Recordings of Mihály Bársony. Edited by Béla Szerényi. Téka Foundation, 2001. TVM 115.

== Sources ==
- Havasréti, Pál; Szerényi, Béla. Magyar Tekerőiskola, Vols. I–IV.
- Szerényi, Béla. "Két tanulmány" (PDF).
