= Tiszakécske =

- Town
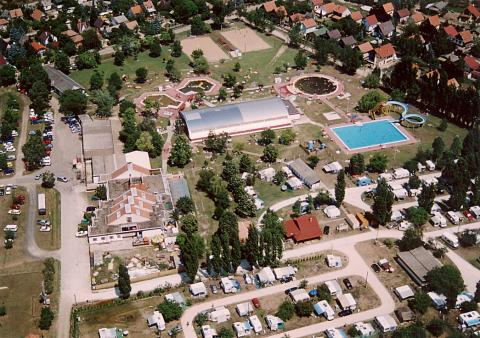
- Aerial view

- Flag Coat of arms

- Location of Tiszakécske
- Coordinates: 46.93119°N 20.09511°E
- Country: Hungary
- County: Bács-Kiskun
- District: Tiszakécske

Government
  - Mayor: János Tóth (Fidesz)

Area
  - Total: 133.27 km^{2} (51.46 sq mi)

Population (2009)
  - Total: 11,504
  - Density: 86.321/km^{2} (223.57/sq mi)
- Time zone: UTC+1 (CET)
  - Summer (DST): UTC+2 (CEST)
- Postal code: 6060
- Area code: (+36) 76
- Website: www.tiszakecske.hu

Tiszakécske (Hungarian pronunciation: [ˈtisɒkeːt͡ʃkɛ]) is a town in Bács-Kiskun county, Hungary and the administrative centre of the Tiszakécske District. It is also famous of its spa and recreational parks.

== Notable people ==
- Zoltán Varga (born 1977), footballer
- József Bujáki (born 1975), footballer
- Zoltán Bánföldi (born 1971), footballer
- János Zováth (born 1977), footballer
- Ernő Kovács (born 1959), mechanical technician, politician, Mayor of Tiszakécske 1998–2014
- Ferenc Seres (born 1945), wrestler

== Sports ==
The town has its own football club, the Tiszakécske FC.

== Twin towns – sister cities ==
Tiszakécske is twinned with:

- Lübbecke, Germany
- Lunca de Sus, Romania
