= Annon =

Annon is an English surname. Notable people with this name include:

- Darren Annon (born 1972), English professional footballer
- William Annon (1912–1983), Northern Irish unionist politician
- Annon (abbot) - 10th Century French Benedictine abbot

== See also ==
- Anno (disambiguation)
- Anon (disambiguation)
