= Anton Anno =

German writer

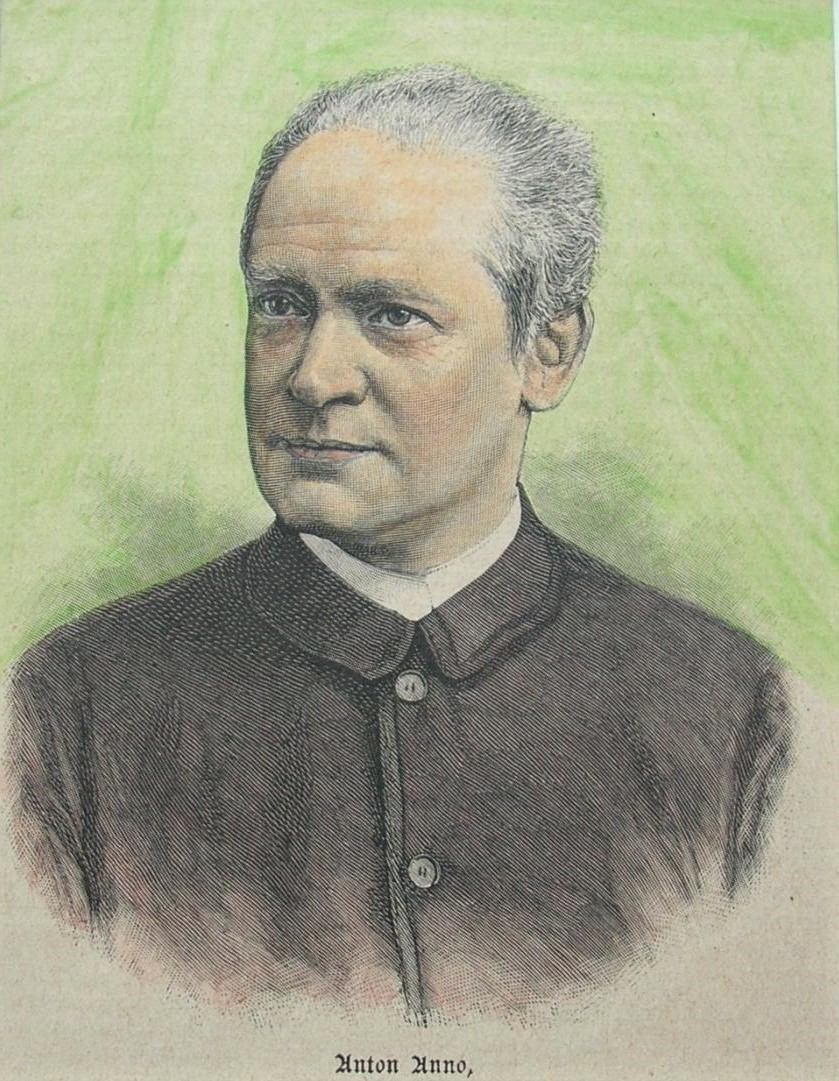
Anton Anno (1886)

Anton Anno (19 March 1838 in Aachen - 1 December 1893 in Berlin) was a German theatre actor, theatre director, and playwright.

== Life ==
Anton Anno was the son of a theatre attendant. He first completed an apprenticeship as a sheet metal worker. In 1856 he started his late father's job at the Aachen City Theatre. In 1860 he was stage manager at the Cologne City Theatre, where he took on small roles. In 1859 he had his first engagement as a young comedian at the Stadttheater Elberfeld.

== Works ==
- Ballet Shoes, farce
- Family Horns, Schwank
- The two Reichenmüllers, Volksstück

== Literature ==
- Ludwig Eisenberg: Large biographical lexicon of the German stage in the 19th century. List, Leipzig 1903, p. 28.
