= Anō Station =

Anō Station is the name of three train stations in Japan:

- Anō Station (Fukuoka) (穴生駅)
- Anō Station (Shiga) (穴太駅)
- Anoh Station (Mie) (穴太駅)
