= Anonymouse (collective) =

Swedish artists collective

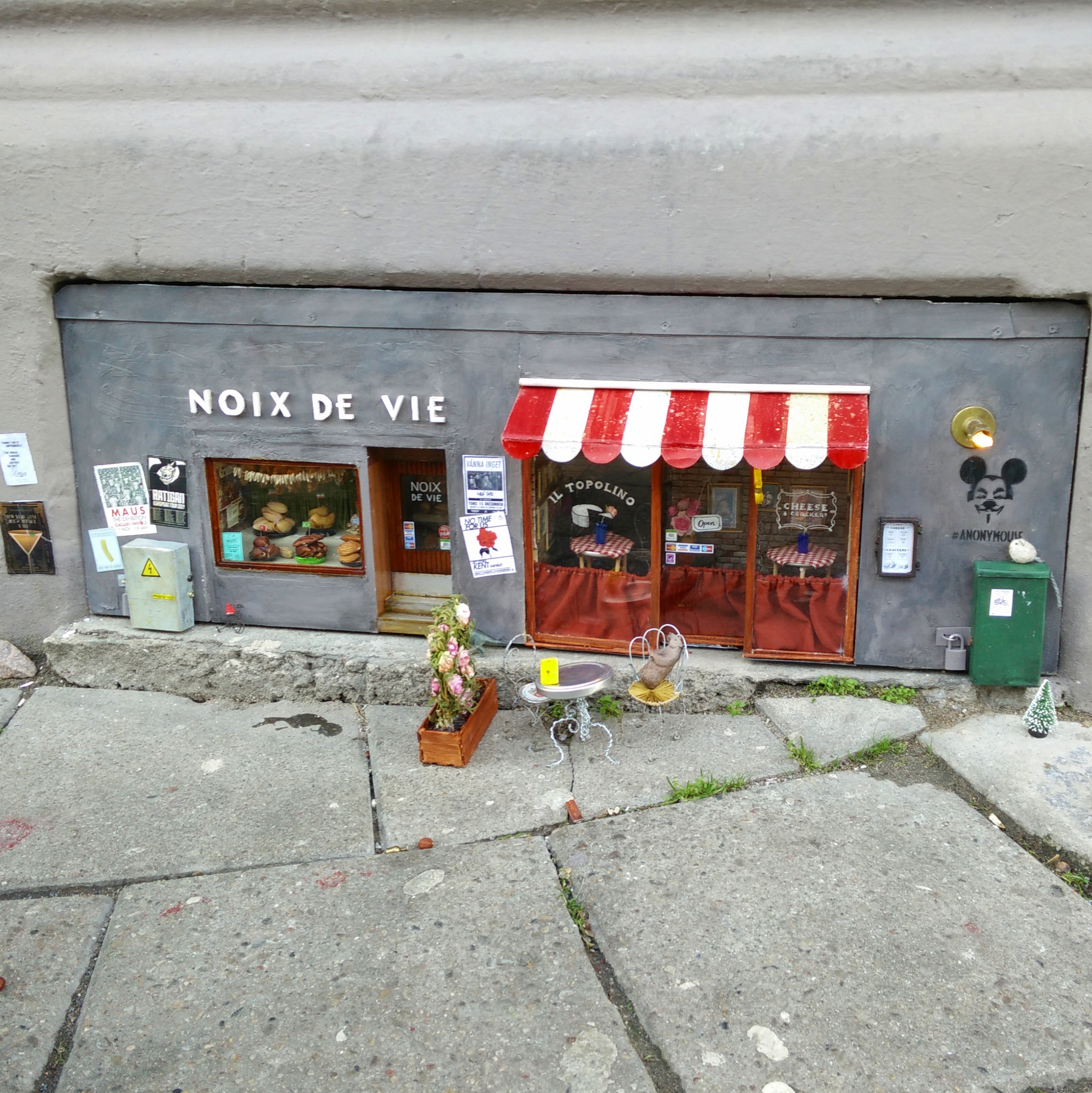
The mouse restaurant Il Topolino, December 2016

Anonymouse (also written as AnonyMouse) were a Swedish art duo who created street installations of mouse-themed miniatures in public places between 2016 and 2025. Their first work was the restaurant Il Topolino that appeared on Bergsgatan in Malmö. It was vandalized a few weeks later. Their identities were unknown until February 2025, when they revealed themselves as Elin Westerholm and Lupus Nensén, and also announced the end of the Anonymouse project.

In April 2017, they created an amusement park at Södra Förstadsgatan. In September 2017, two shops and a gas station opened in Borås. The duo also built exhibits in Bayonne and on the Isle of Man in 2018 and later the same year a miniature barber shop and a shelter for mice in Malmö. In May 2019 a detective agency in Malmö and a website opened, where the public was invited to solve a fictitious case. The duo have also set up works in Canada and the United States.

== Gallery ==
Works by Anonymouse
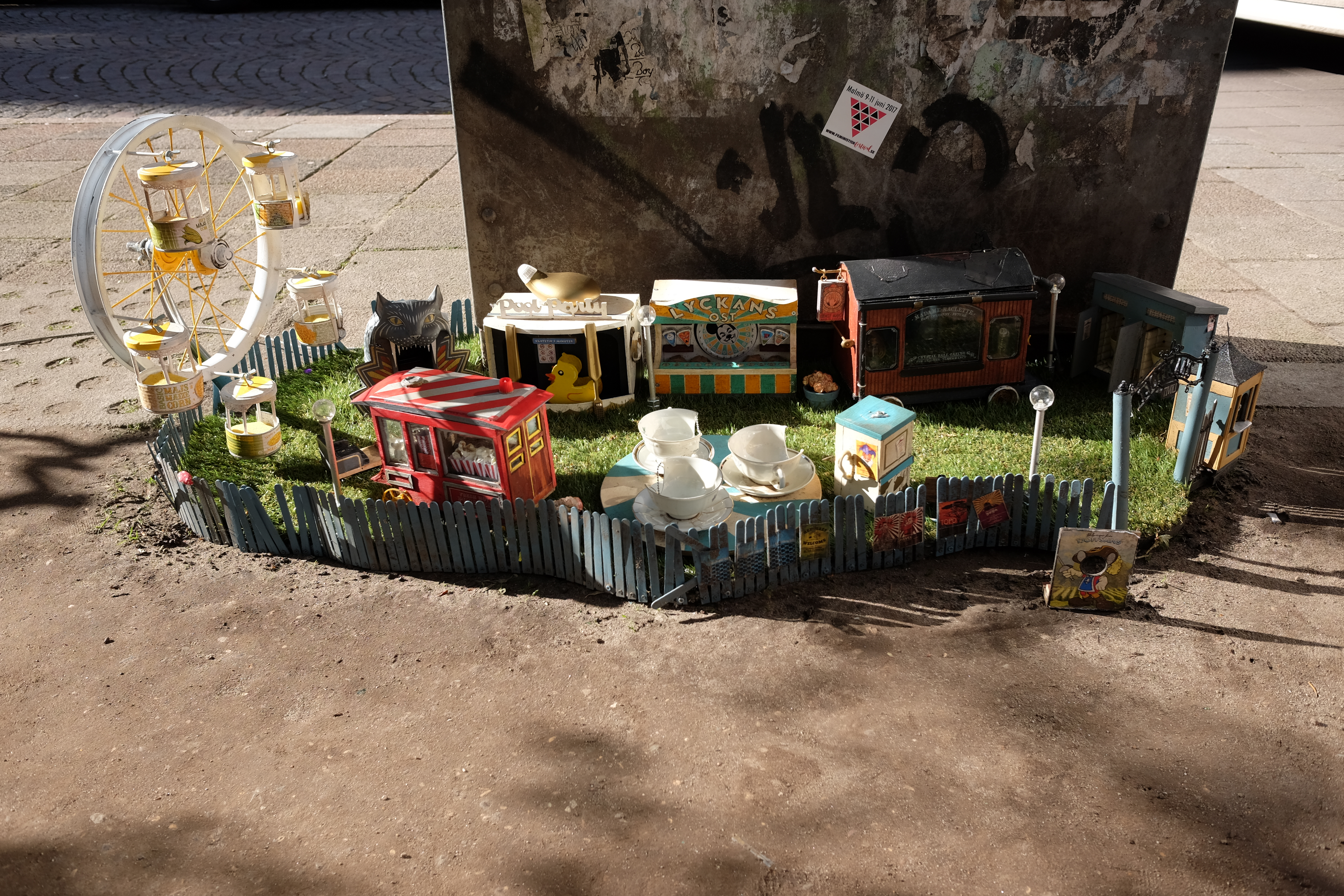
Amusement park in Malmö, April 2017

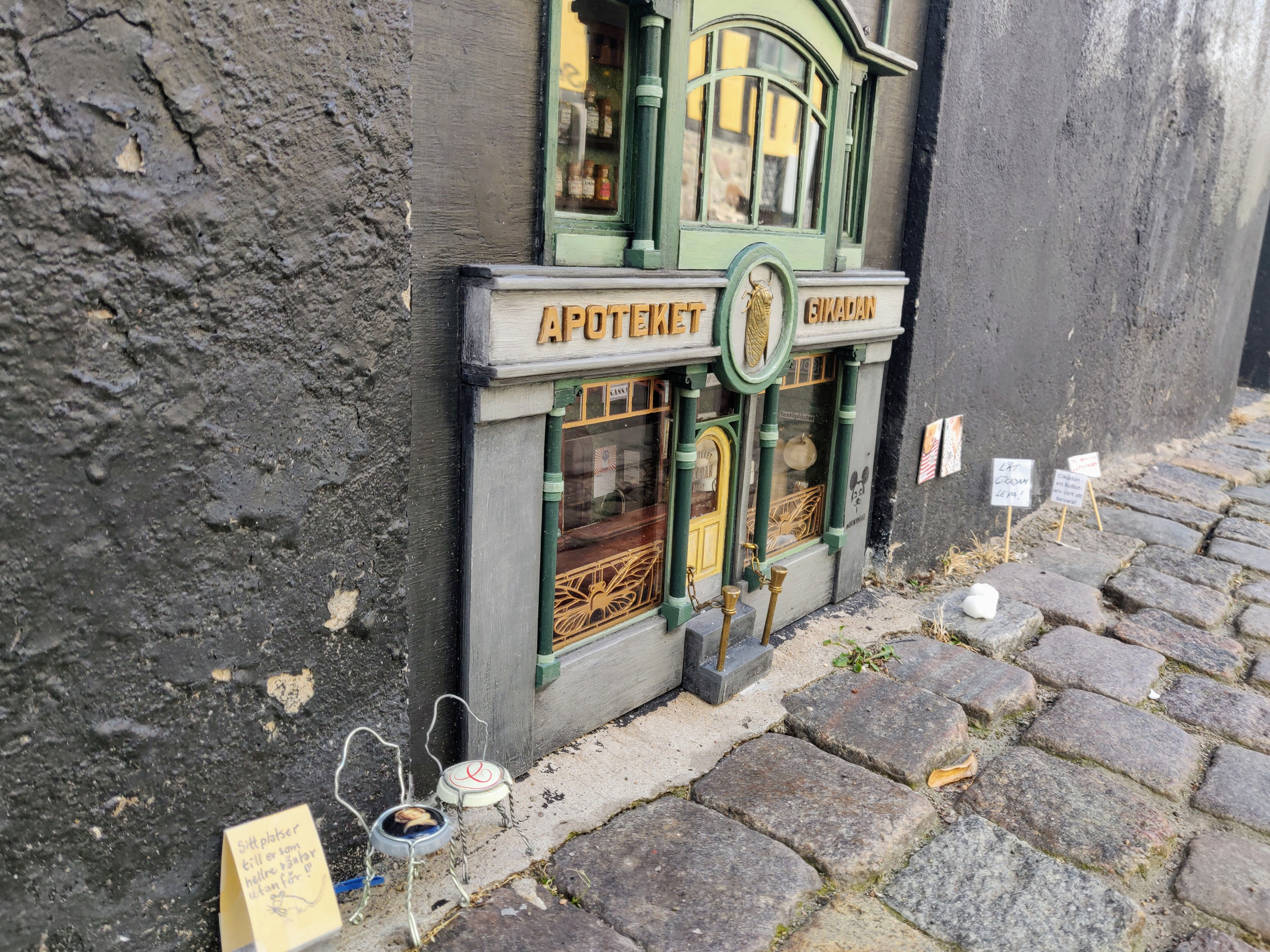
Pharmacy in Lund, July 2020

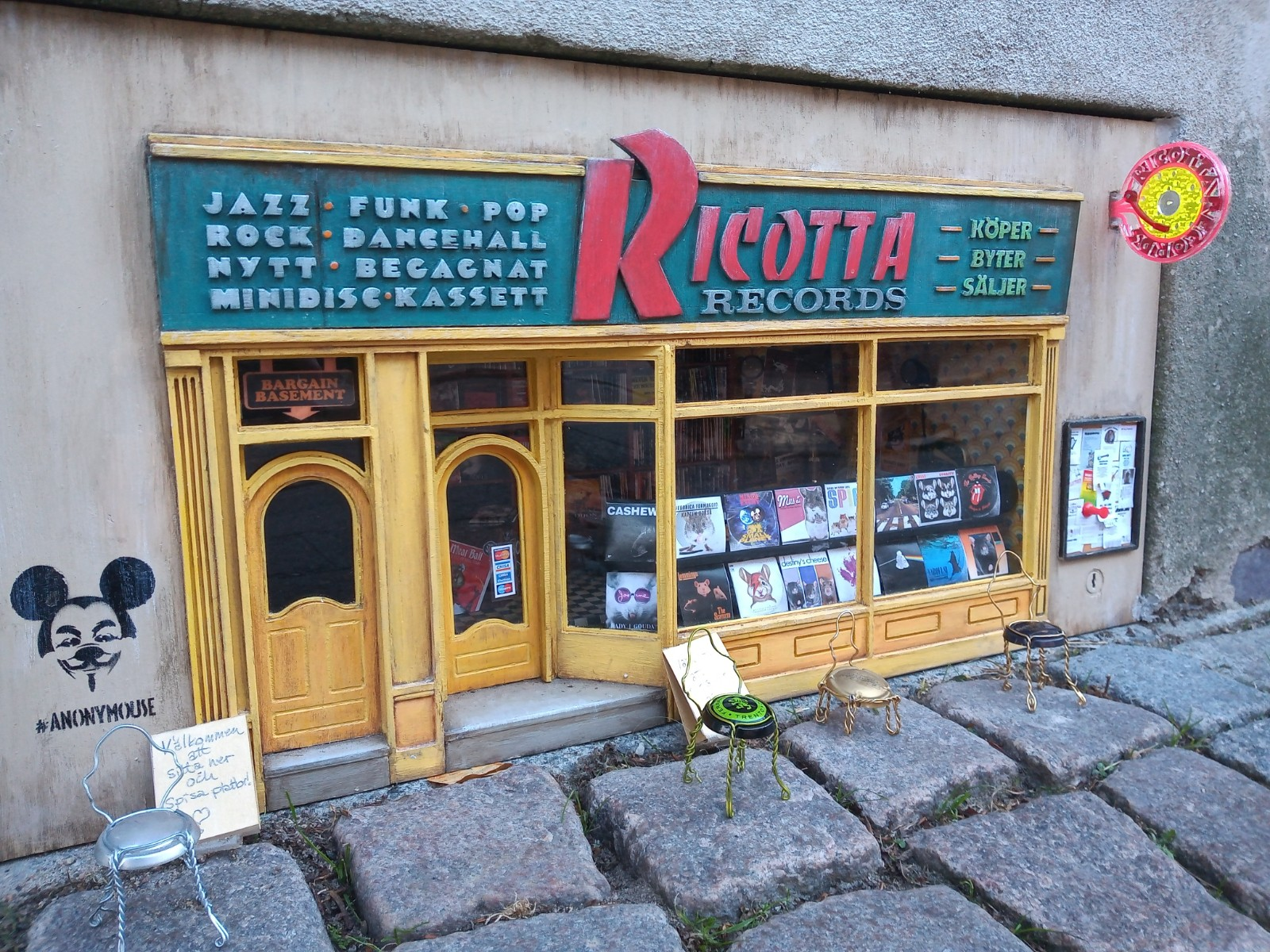
Record store in Lund, August 2020

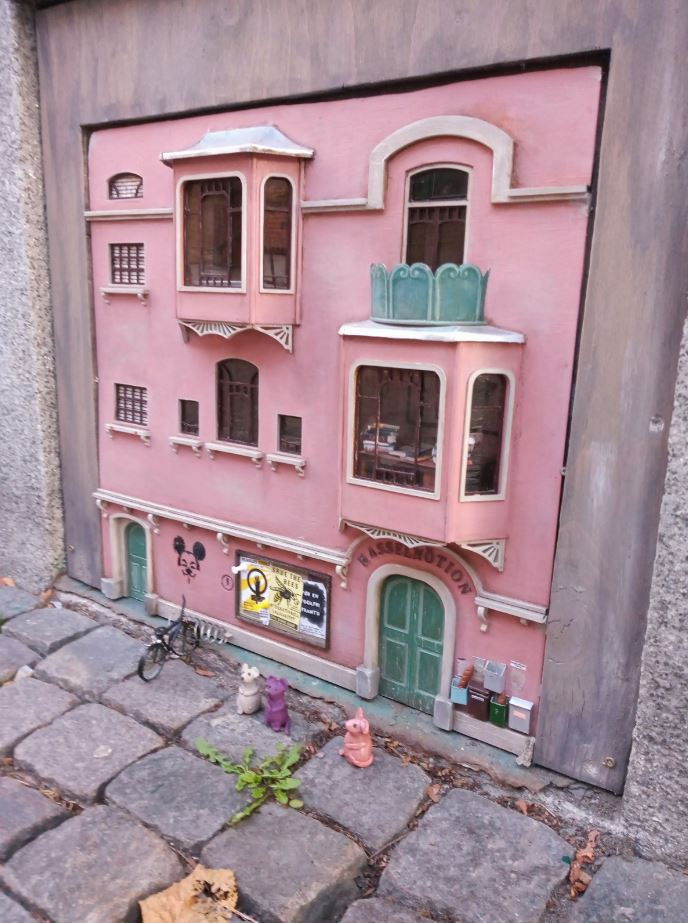
Apartment building in Lund, September 2020
