= Lakitelek =

Large village in Hungary

- Large village
- Flag Coat of arms

- Location within Bács-Kiskun County Location within Hungary Location within Europe
- Coordinates: 46°53′N 19°59′E
- Country: Hungary
- County: Bács-Kiskun
- District: Tiszakécske

Area
  - Total: 54.66 km^{2} (21.10 sq mi)

Population (2015)
  - Total: 4,411
  - Density: 80.7/km^{2} (209/sq mi)
- Time zone: UTC+1 (CET)
  - Summer (DST): UTC+2 (CEST)
- Postal code: 6065
- Area code: (+36) 76

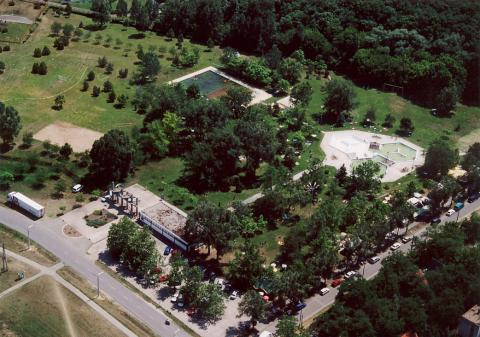
Lakitelek tőserdő légifotó

Lakitelek is a large village in Bács-Kiskun county, in the Southern Great Plain region of southern Hungary.

== Geography ==
It covers an area of 54.66 km^{2} (21 sq mi) and had a population of 4411 people in 2015. It is 120 km (75 mi) from Budapest, 27 km (17 mi) from Kecskemét, and only 3 km (1.9 mi) from the river of Tisza. It is easily accessible from several directions- either on the main road M44 or by rail on the MÁV No. 146 Kecskemét – Kunszentmárton and No. 145 Szolnok – Kiskunfélegyháza railway side lines. The two railway lines intersect in Lakitelek.

== History ==
The current area was established in 1949-50 by merging the steppes that belonged to Kecskemét. The outlying settlements included Felsőalpár, Kisalpár, Oncsa, Árpádszállás, Szikra, and Kapásfalu. The town has a rich historical background, as its geographical location attracted settlers long before recorded history. The earliest archaeological discoveries date back to the Copper Age, from the Bodrogkeresztúr culture, with evidence suggesting that people have inhabited this region since the 3rd millennium BC.
