= Anonymus Seguerianus =

Anonymus Seguerianus or Anonymous Seguerianus is the name given to an unknown author that has left us an ancient Greek rhetorical treatise titled the Art of Political Speech (Ancient Greek: Τέχνη τοῦ πολιτικοῦ λóγου, romanized: Téchnē toũ politikoũ lógou) that was probably written in the first half of the third century CE.

The work survives in a single twelfth century manuscript that was discovered in 1838 in the Royal Library in Paris by the French scholar Nicolas Séguier, marquis de St. Brisson, from whom the work's author takes its name. Two years later Séguier published the first edition of the work. In 1891 Johann Graeven edited a new edition in which he advanced the theory that the work could be attributed to the third-century rhetorician Cornutus and that the extant treatise should be considered an epitome of the original work.

While the theory of Cornutus' authorship has not proved popular the idea that the work should be considered an abridgment of a longer work is still debated. According to George A. Kennedy the author should be considered a student who simply put together a compilation compilation rhetorical invention that probably put together the work using previous sources (mostly Alexander Numenius together with Neocles and Aelius Harpocration) simply for his own use. To make their point more persuasive they also notice that the anonymous never advances any opinion of his own, as would be expected from a teacher; an interpretation that was strongly opposed by Michel Patillon, who instead sees him as an original author who is presenting his own interpretation of common doctrine.

Previously Julius Brzoska writing in the Realencyclopädie der classischen Altertumswissenschaft argued that "only by accepting that this work is an epitome can one understand and explain the multiple abbreviations, additions, deletions, repetitions, displacements, misunderstandings." On a similar vein, more recently Malcolm Heath rebutted Kennedy answering that it "remains virtually certain that the text which Séguier discovered is a shortened version", observing that an anonymous Greek commentary to Hermogenes' De inventione preserves the same sources of the Seguerianus and presents them in the same way but also quotes content absent from the extant book, thus indicating that the commentator used a more extensive text.
