= Tiszaug =

Coordinates: 46°51′N 20°04′E

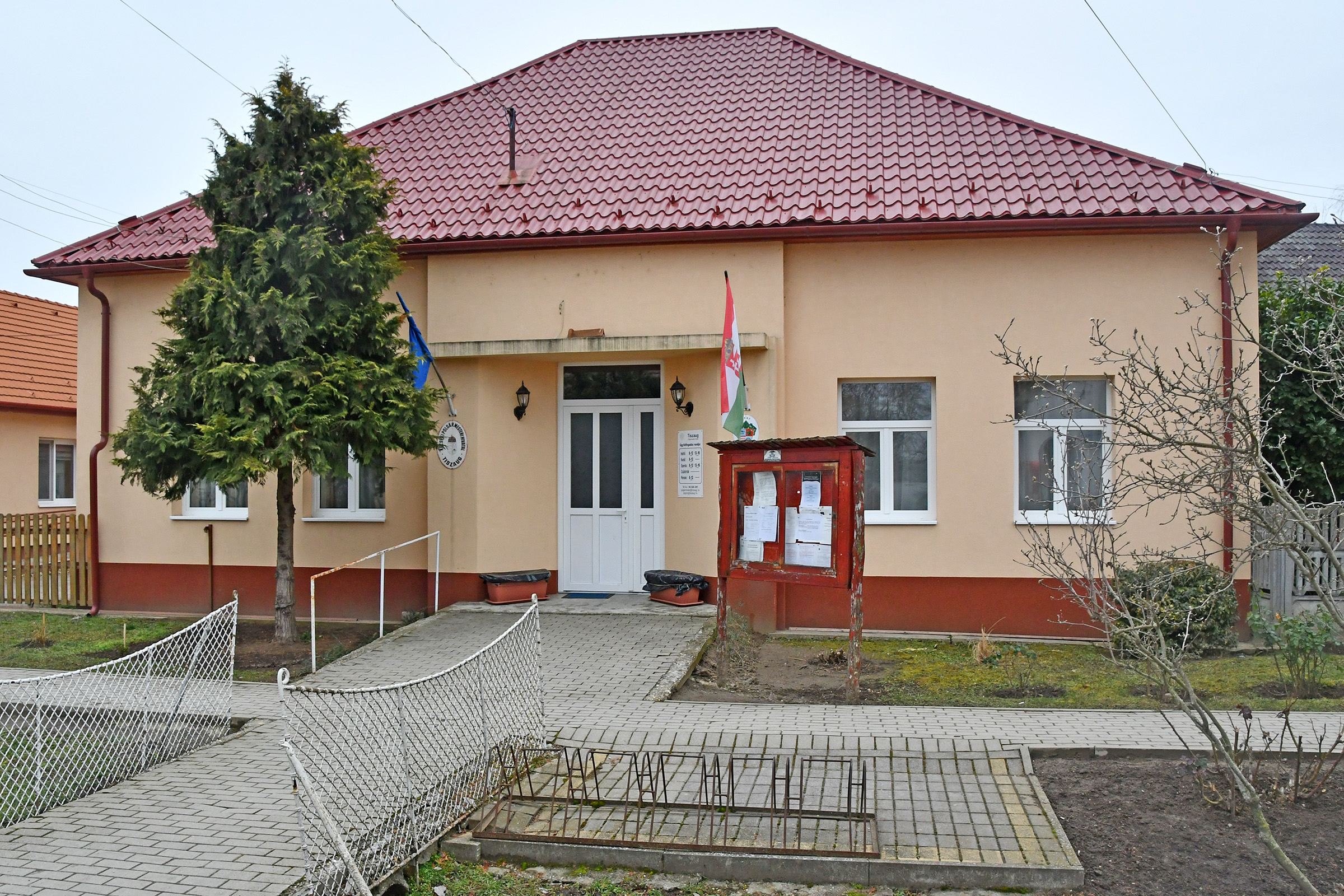
- Village hall
- Interactive map of Tiszaug
- Country: Hungary
- County: Bács-Kiskun

Area
  - Total: 25.04 km^{2} (9.67 sq mi)

Population (2015)
  - Total: 889
  - Density: 35.5/km^{2} (92/sq mi)
- Time zone: UTC+1 (CET)
  - Summer (DST): UTC+2 (CEST)
- Postal code: 6064
- Area code: 56

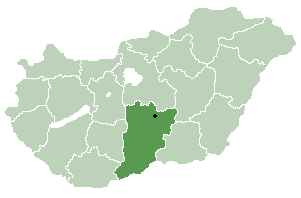
Location of Bács-Kiskun county in Hungary

Tiszaug is a village in Bács-Kiskun county, in the Southern Great Plain region of southern Hungary.

== Geography ==
It covers an area of 25.04 km^{2} (10 sq mi) and has a population of 889 people (2015).

== Villages near by Tiszaug ==
- Cserkeszőlő
- Tiszakécske
- Lakitelek

== Towns near by Tiszaug ==
- Kecskemét
- Szolnok
