= Anon =

Anon may refer to:

== Arts and media ==
- Anon (album), a 2018 album by Hands Like Houses
- Anon (band)
- Anon (film), a 2018 British science fiction thriller film

== People with the given name ==
- Anon Amornlerdsak (born 1997), a Thai footballer
- Anon Boonsukco (born 1978), a professional footballer from Thailand
- Anon Nampa, Thai human rights activist
- Anon Nanok (born 1983), a football Defender from Thailand
- Anon San-Mhard (born 1991), a Thai footballer
- Anon Sangsanoi (born 1984), a Thai footballer
- Anon Chihaya (千早 愛音), a character in the musical media franchise BanG Dream! and spin-off anime series

== Places ==
- Anón, a barrio of Ponce, Puerto Rico
- Añón de Moncayo, a municipality in the province of Zaragoza, Aragon, Spain
- Anones, a barrio of Naranjito, Puerto Rico
- Río Anón, a river in Ponce, Puerto Rico

== Other uses ==
- An anonymous person
  - An online post made by such a person (see anonymous post)
- Anonymous (hacker group), an internet movement and group
- Bol-anon, the Boholano people of the island province of Bohol, Philippines
- Anon (Tron), the main protagonist of the 2010 video game Tron: Evolution

== See also ==
- Annon, a surname
- Annona, a genus of flowering plants in the pawpaw/sugar apple family, "Annonaceae"
- Anonymous (disambiguation)
