= Independence Day (franchise) =

American media franchise

- Created by: Roland Emmerich; Dean Devlin
- Original work: Independence Day (1996)
- Owner: 20th Century Studios

Print publications
- Book(s): List of books (1996–2016)

Films and television
- Film(s): Independence Day (1996); Independence Day: Resurgence (2016)

Games
- Video game(s): Independence Day (1997); ID4 Online (2000)

Audio
- Radio program(s): Independence Day UK (1996)
- Soundtrack(s): Independence Day (1996); Independence Day: Resurgence (2016)

Independence Day (also known as ID and ID4) is a franchise of American science fiction action films that started with Independence Day in 1996, which was followed by the sequel, Independence Day: Resurgence in 2016. The franchise revolves around extraterrestrials invading Earth and seeking to eradicate mankind while the remaining human resistance uses everything at their disposal to defeat the invaders and take back the planet. Now considered to be a significant turning point in the history of the Hollywood blockbuster, the original film was released worldwide on July 3, 1996, but began showing on July 2 (the same day the film's story begins) on limited release as a result of a high level of anticipation among moviegoers. The film grossed over $817.4 million worldwide, becoming the highest-grossing film of 1996 and, briefly, the second-highest-grossing film worldwide of all time behind 1993's Jurassic Park. Currently, it ranks 69th on the list of highest-grossing films, and was at the forefront of the large-scale disaster film and sci-fi resurgence of the mid-late 1990s. The film won the Academy Award for Best Visual Effects and was nominated for the Academy Award for Best Sound Mixing.

== Films ==
=== Independence Day (1996) ===
The film focuses on disparate groups of people who converge in the Nevada desert in the aftermath of a worldwide attack by an extraterrestrial race of unknown origin. With the other people of the world, they launch a last-ditch counterattack on July 4—Independence Day in the United States.

=== Independence Day: Resurgence (2016) ===
The film takes place twenty years after the events of the first film, during which the United Nations has collaborated to form Earth Space Defense (ESD), an international military defense and research organization. Through reverse engineering, the world has harnessed the power of alien technology and laid the groundwork to resist a second invasion.

=== Future ===
In May 2015, Deadline reported that Independence Day 3 and Independence Day 4 were being planned. In June 2016, during an interview with Empire magazine, Emmerich stated that a third film could be made, depending on the success of the second one. He also said that audiences would not have to wait as long as they did for the second in the series. According to Emmerich, the third film will depict an intergalactic journey, possibly set a year or two later since he wants to maintain the same group of people, especially the young characters. In October 2016, Emmerich spoke with Comingsoon.net and mentioned that potential sequels could be produced as TV-films, though they were still uncertain about how they would move forward with the sequels.

In March 2018, LRM Online reported that, after having met producer Dean Devlin at WonderCon and asking about the status of Independence Day 3, Devlin told them "I don’t know. I don’t know. Currently, I personally have no plans on doing another one." Following this, Ryan Scott at MovieWeb translated the poor reception of the second film and Devlin's comments as meaning Independence Day 3 will likely not happen, also noting that 20th Century Fox merging with The Walt Disney Company (meaning Disney will be in control of Fox's franchises) would make it even less likely that a third film would be pursued.

== Cast and characters ==
Character	Films	
Character	Independence Day	Independence Day: Resurgence
Character	1996	2016
Captain Steven Hiller	Will Smith	Will Smith (photograph)
President Thomas J. Whitmore	Bill Pullman	Bill Pullman
David Levinson	Jeff Goldblum	Jeff Goldblum
Marine Captain Jimmy Wilder	Harry Connick Jr.	
First Lady Marilyn Whitmore	Mary McDonnell	
Julius Levinson	Judd Hirsch	Judd Hirsch
Constance Spano	Margaret Colin	
Russell Casse	Randy Quaid	
General William Grey	Robert Loggia	Robert Loggia
Albert Nimzicki	James Rebhorn	
Marty Gilbert	Harvey Fierstein	
Major Mitchell	Adam Baldwin	
Dr. Brackish Okun	Brent Spiner	Brent Spiner
Miguel Casse	James Duval	
Jasmine Dubrow-Hiller	Vivica A. Fox	Vivica A. Fox
Alicia Casse	Lisa Jakub	
Dylan Dubrow-Hiller	Ross Bagley	Jessie T. Usher
Patricia Whitmore	Mae Whitman	Maika Monroe
Lt. Col. Watson	Bill Smitrovich	
Tiffany	Kiersten Warren	
Troy Casse	Giuseppe Andrews	
Milton Isaacs	John Storey	John Storey
Jake Morrison		Liam Hemsworth
Charlie Miller		Travis Tope
President/General Joshua T. Adams		William Fichtner
Dr. Catherine Marceaux		Charlotte Gainsbourg
President Elizabeth Lanford		Sela Ward
Rain Lao		Angelababy
Samantha Blackwell		Joey King
Floyd Rosenberg		Nicolas Wright
Dikembe Umbutu		DeObia Wright
Jiang Lao		Chin Han
Reese Tanner		Patrick St. Esprit
Agent Matthew Travis		Gbenga Akinnagbe
Bobby Blackwell		Garrett Wareing
Felix Blackwell		Hays Wellford
Daisy Blackwell		Mckenna Grace
Captain McQuade		Robert Neary

== Crew ==
Role	Film	
Role	Independence Day	Independence Day: Resurgence
Role	1996	2016
Director	Roland Emmerich	Roland Emmerich
Writer(s)	Dean Devlin; Roland Emmerich	Screenplay by Nicolas Wright; James A. Woods; Dean Devlin; Roland Emmerich; James Vanderbilt Story by Dean Devlin; Roland Emmerich; Nicolas Wright; James A. Woods
Producer(s)	Dean Devlin	Dean Devlin; Harald Kloser; Roland Emmerich
Composer	David Arnold	Thomas Wander; Harald Kloser
Cinematographer	Karl Walter Lindenlaub	Markus Förderer
Editor	David Brenner	Adam Wolfe
Production companies	Centropolis Entertainment	Centropolis Entertainment; Electric Entertainment
Distributor	20th Century Fox	

== Reception ==
=== Box office performance ===
Film	Release date	Box Office Gross			Budget	References
Film	Release date	Domestic	Foreign	Worldwide	Budget	References
Independence Day	July 3, 1996	$306,169,268	$511,231,623	$817,400,891	$75 million	
Independence Day: Resurgence	June 24, 2016	$103,144,286	$286,537,649	$389,681,935	$165 million	
Total		$409,313,554	$797,769,272	$1,207,082,826	$240 million	

=== Critical response ===
Film	Rotten Tomatoes	Metacritic	CinemaScore
Independence Day	67% (79 reviews)	59 (19 critics)	A
Independence Day: Resurgence	29% (232 reviews)	32 (40 critics)	B

== Publications ==
The franchise has been the inspiration for a series of novels and comic books.

=== Novels ===
The first three novels were originally published in the 1990s based on the 1996 release of the first film, and were republished in March 2016 as a single-volume edition (The Complete Independence Day Omnibus).

==== Independence Day (1996) ====
The first book in the series is the novelization of the first film. Author Stephen Molstad wrote the novel to help promote the film shortly before its release. The novel goes into further detail on the characters, situations, and overall concepts not explored in the film. The novel presents the film's finale as originally scripted, with the character played by Randy Quaid stealing a missile and roping it to his cropduster biplane.

==== Independence Day: Silent Zone (1998) ====
Following the film's success, a prequel novel entitled Independence Day: Silent Zone was written by Molstad in February 1998. The novel is set in the late 1960s and early 1970s, and details the early career of Dr. Brackish Okun.

==== Independence Day: War in the Desert (1999) ====
Molstad wrote a third novel, Independence Day: War in the Desert in July 1999. Set in Saudi Arabia on July 3, it centers around Captain Cummins and Colonel Thompson (ranks corrected to Squadron Leader and Group Captain respectively in the Omnibus reissue), the two Royal Air Force officers seen receiving the Morse code message in the film.

==== Independence Day: Crucible (2016) ====
Independence Day: Crucible is the fourth book in the series, published in May 2016 bridging the events of Independence Day and its sequel.

The novel focuses on the back story to Resurgence over a period of 20 years after the "War of 1996" and introduces new characters such as orphan Jake Morrison and tribe leader Dikembe Umbutu, whose ground battle in Africa reveals that aliens managed to land the only surviving city destroyer somewhere in the Congo during the initial attack. It also explains the after-effects of humans whose minds were hijacked by the aliens during the invasion, including Umbutu and President Whitmore. It also follows David Levinson's ascent to the head of the Earth Space Defense (ESD), Steve Hiller's son Dylan and his friendship with Jake and Patricia Whitmore, and Steve's untimely death caused by an accident while testing aircraft with alien technology designed by the ESD.

==== Independence Day: Resurgence (2016) ====
Independence Day: Resurgence is the novelization of the film of the same name written by Alex Irvine, and the fifth book in the series. It was published on June 21, 2016, three days before the release of the second film on June 24, 2016.

The novelization includes many scenes from the original screenplay that were removed from the final theatrical release, including an alternate opening scene which features the wormhole causing the destruction of a moon base on Rhea, and some other scenes presented in a different order.

=== Comics ===
==== Independence Day (Marvel Comics) (1996) ====
A comic book series by Marvel Comics (issue #0, issue #0 variant, issue #1, issue #2, and issue #1 trade paperback) was also produced and based on the first two novelizations.

==== Independence Day: Dark Fathom (2016) ====
A comic book series by Titan Comics titled Independence Day: Dark Fathom was produced to promote and lead up to the events of the second film. It was sold with the option to print custom comic stores on the cover being blown up by the alien spaceships.

=== Other ===
==== Independence Day: The Official Collector's Magazine (1996) ====
Independence Day: The Official Collector's Magazine is a 68-page magazine by MVP Licensing, Inc. The magazine contains exclusive interviews, production information, and behind-the-scenes features, complete with color photos. The magazine is divided into 5 main sections, focusing on different aspects of the film production.

==== The Art and Making of Independence Day: Resurgence (2016) ====
The Art and Making of Independence Day: Resurgence is an art book based on the making of the titular film.

== Plays ==
=== Independence Day UK (1996) ===
On August 4, 1996, BBC Radio 1 broadcast the one-hour play Independence Day UK, written, produced, and directed by Dirk Maggs, a spin-off depicting the alien invasion from a British perspective. None of the original cast was present. Dean Devlin gave Maggs permission to produce an original version, on the condition that he did not reveal certain details of the movie's plot, and that the British were not depicted as saving the day. Independence Day UK was set up to be similar to the 1938 radio broadcast of The War of the Worlds—the first 20 minutes were presented as if live.

== Video games ==
Various video games based upon the franchise have been produced all the way back from 1996 and up until 2016.

=== ID4 Interactive Kit - Jet Strike - Hollywood Online (1996) ===
Produced / Distributed by Hollywood Online and 20th Century Fox, an 8-bit game called 'Jet Strike' was included along with other promotional features like film notes, glossary, production and a film clip. There were both PC and Mac versions. The Jet Strike 8-bit game involved flying a single fighter jet against incoming alien attackers in a side scrolling format. It ended with an attack against a city destroyer where the player has a single chance to fire a missile at the opportune time to win. At the time of publishing it is still accessible through the Internet Archive's Software Collection via DOSBox / Windows 3.x emulation.

=== ID4.COM Shockwave Mini Games (1996) ===
On the original www.id4.com 1996 website, 20th Century Fox produced and Media Revolution (defunct) developed, 4 mini games playable in either the web browser with Shockwave Plugin or as downloadable executables. Progress in these games were linked to an unlockable online comic with the final game being also linked to a contest. The games were, 1. Flight Sim: piloting an F/A-18 in a simulated canyon trench dodging obstacles, 2. Canyon Run: flying an F/A-18 through a canyon while being chased by an Alien Attacker, 3. Virus Upload: hack through the alien firewalls to implant a computer virus & 4. Game 4 Contest: Fly an F/A-18 after the shields have been brought down against unlimited Alien Attackers. The player tries to break the record of number of kills before dying to win a contest.

=== Independence Day - Trendmasters Computer Mission Disks (1996) ===
In 1996, Trendmasters included 11 floppy disk 16-bit Macromedia games for PC with their action figures. There was a mail in offer for Mac versions but these versions never seemed to have a floppy release. Softcopy PC and Mac versions were available on Trendmasters site as free downloads until their license expired. The games were Mission Disk 1: Command the Alien Invasion, Mission Disk 2: Mutate DNA, Mission Disk 3: Construct Weapons, Mission Disk 4: Classified (Commandeer Earth Satellites), Mission Disk 5: Jumpstart an Attacker, Mission Disk 6: Infect the Mothership, Mission Disk 7: Bomb the City Destroyers, Mission Disk 8: Classified Attacker Information, Mission Disk 9: Top Secret, Mission Disk 10: Blast a Major City, and Mission Disk 11: Launch an Attacker.

=== Independence Day (Pinball) (1996) ===
In June 1996, Sega Pinball, Inc. released a pinball game based upon the 1996 film of the same name.

=== Independence Day Tiger Games (LCD) (1996) ===
In 1996, Tiger Electronics, Inc. released 2 handheld LCD games based upon the film of the same name.

The standard edition involved flying an F/A-18 against incoming Alien Attackers. At the end of each of the five levels, the player could take out the Mothership, and could play as Cpt. Steven Hiller on foot shooting at Aliens.

The Laser version involved using a small handheld laser gun to shoot at incoming Alien Attackers and Motherships. The receptors for the laser involved 4 points dedicated to a quadrant of the screen. It had 10 levels with each increasing in difficulty with more enemies approaching faster at multiple quadrants.

=== Inside Independence Day (1996) ===
In 1996 a "behind-the-scenes" multimedia CD-ROM titled Inside Independence Day was released for Microsoft Windows and Macintosh; it includes storyboards for the film, sketches, movie clips, and a preview of the Independence Day video game.

=== Independence Day (ID4: The Game) (1997) ===
Independence Day is a combat flight simulator video game based on the 1996 film of the same name. The game was developed by Radical Entertainment and published by Fox Interactive for Microsoft Windows, PlayStation, Sega Saturn, and mobile. Originally meant to release in 1996 but was delayed until 1997. Involved arcade like controls, fighting under a City Destroyer at various besieged cities around the globe, bonus levels at remote locations and the final mission inside the Mothership. Many military jets were unlockable with the final mission allowing the player fly the captured Alien Attacker from Area 51 and using it to fire a nuke at the Alien primary power source.

=== Independence Day Online (ID4 Online) (2000) ===
ID4 Online (2000), known more formally as Independence Day Online, was an arena-based action game developed by Mythic Entertainment, and published by Centropolis Entertainment. The game was billed as a direct sequel based on the movie Independence Day. This game was no longer available on early 2006, along with all other games offered on the Mythic-Realms gaming center excluding Dragon's Gate. On June 20, 2006, Mythic Entertainment was purchased by Electronic Arts. The game was space based first person shooter using human alien hybrid technologies fighting above various planets in the solar system. The player could fight as either humans or Aliens.

=== ID4 Get Off My Planet DVD ROM Game (2000) ===
For the 2000 DVD Five Star Collection Special Edition release of the movie, a DVD ROM game named 'Get Off My Planet' was included. It involved decoding Morse code against a deadline timer in order to defeat the Aliens.

=== Independence Day 3D Java (2005) ===
Independence Day 3D was a wireless Java based mobile version of the brand released in 2005. It involves flying an F/A-18 Hornet over various cities where a miniature Alien City Destroyer destroys the skyscrapers one at a time. To win, the player must take out the miniature City Destroyer before all buildings are destroyed.

=== ID4Game.com (2016) ===
To promote the Blu-Ray 20th Anniversary & Ultimate Edition release, a web browser game was released by 20th Century Fox Home. It involved 8 bit graphics and was a side scroller where the player piloted a fighter jet against Alien Attackers. After which the player entered the interior of a Mothership (exterior had a City Destroyer appearance while interior resembled the Mothership) to drop a nuclear bomb on a precise target. The site was taken down once Disney acquired the Fox Home websites and domains.

=== Independence Day My Street (2016) ===
Promoting the release of the second film, 20th Century Fox produced a website where one could use satellite imagery of their neighborhood and see what it would look like after an alien attack.

=== Independence Day: Join the ESD (2016) ===
Promoting the release of the second film, 20th Century Fox produced a website where the player could enlist the fictional Earth Space Defense (ESD) and receiving new ranks by completing different challenges and games. These games were developed by MRM//McCann. This was tied to a recruitment planned with participation of the US Army. Each game while based on the fight against aliens tied back to real world professions within the US Army like Microbiologist and Cryptologic Network Warfare Specialist. The games were, 1. Aerial Recon: Pilot a drone simulation to disable the Alien shields, 2. Bio Extract: Isolate Alien microbes to ward off their telepathic mind control, 3. Crack the Alien coded message and 4. Spacecraft Overhaul: Perform mechanic repair to a Space Moon Tug.

=== Independence Day: Resurgence - Battle Heroes (2016) ===
Independence Day: Resurgence - Battle Heroes was a free mobile app strategy game based on Independence Day: Resurgence. The game was developed by Zen Studios and Fox Digital Entertainment and was available to download for free on the iTunes App Store, Google Play and the Amazon Appstore. The game was an online only, mostly spaced based combat game with turn based mechanics. The player worked to unlock and upgrade Earth space fighters from different nations to fight Aliens around various locations in the Solar System.

=== Independence Day: Extinction (2016) ===
Independence Day: Extinction was a mobile game created by Linekong U.S. and based on Independence Day: Resurgence. The game was released on June 30, 2016, and was available to download for free on the iTunes App Store and Google Play. The game was an online turn based strategy game where the player would choose to either fight as the humans or the Aliens. It involved resource mining, base building and upgrading technologies. You could then attack other players' bases while they were away using space based energy / gravity weapons, flying craft, tanks, hovering artillery and ground troops.

== Toys ==
Trendmasters released a toy line for the original film in 1996 and a second wave in 1997. Each action figure, vehicle or playset of the first wave came with a 3½" floppy disk that contained an interactive PC game (Mac version could be ordered via mail). Cepia was scheduled to release a toy line of action figures, vehicles and hand held weapons in time for the second film, unfortunately due to delayed production they never saw wide release. Pop Funko also released various figures based on the franchise.

== Attractions ==
=== Independence Day: Defiance ===
An Independence Day: Defiance ride opened at Genting SkyWorlds.
