= Independence Day (soundtrack) =

- 2010 limited edition cover art

Film score by David Arnold
- Released: July 2, 1996 (original); April 27, 2010 (limited edition)
- Recorded: 1996
- Genre: Film score
- Length: 50:23 (original); 128:38 (limited edition)
- Label: RCA Victor (original); La-La Land Records (limited edition); Fox Music (limited edition)

Independence Day chronology
Independence Day (1996)	Independence Day: Resurgence (2016)

David Arnold chronology
Last of the Dogmen (1995)	Independence Day (1996)	A Life Less Ordinary (1997)

The soundtrack to the 1996 science fiction action film Independence Day features musical score composed by David Arnold. It was first issued by RCA Victor in conjunction with the film's release consisted over fourteen tracks. An expanded score was released by La-La Land Records and Fox Music in April 2010, in a limited edition two-disc set that contains the film's score in its entirety in addition to 12 alternate cues. The score was acclaimed by critics and won the Grammy Award for Best Instrumental Composition Written for Motion Picture or Television.

== Background ==
The film marked Arnold's second collaboration with Roland Emmerich and Dean Devlin after working on the duo with Stargate (1994). He received the script for Independence Day and started sent to Emmerich and Devlin, before the film's shooting began. He also visited the film's set and wrote some music there and simultaneously wrote music at an hotel in Los Angeles, where Devlin would come there and listen to few key scenes, though neither Devlin and Emmerich listened the whole score (or nearly 70 percent of it) until the scoring sessions. He spent nearly four to five months writing the film's score.

At that point, he used several synthesizers: Atari video game console with Pro 24 audio, 16 MIDI channels, Korg M1, and samplers from Akai and Proteus Design Suite to record the score, although he might use real instruments to do the same. He did not mockup the score apart from key sequences, especially the president's speech and aliens' visit to United States. The former was considered as an important part of the film, and Arnold being keen on completing the score before recording. He wrote the basic sketches and sent the sketches to Nicholas Dodd, who orchestrated the score from the initial sketches derived.

== Reception ==
Filmtracks.com said "Independence Day is a highlight of film music in the 1990's, a carefree expression of popcorn-ready bombast not equaled in its ferocity during the early years of CGI-dominated pictures. At a time when blockbuster scores were headed in the direction of Hans Zimmer's synthetic and simplistic constructs, Arnold's score was a blazing continuation of a previous generation of orchestral force." Zanobard Reviews rated the score 9 out of 10 and wrote "David Arnold created a masterpiece with Independence Day, and it was a shame that he did not return for the sequel. Nevertheless, what we have here for the first film is a score for the ages, and one that definitely will not go quietly into the night."

James Southall of Movie Wave wrote "It's blissfully unsubtle, breathlessly exciting from start to end, and the orchestration is bright enough that it avoids the headache-inducing stupour that can be caused by scores like this. Fifty minutes is the perfect length – any more, and it would surely outstay its welcome – and Arnold is unlikely to ever top this one." Calling it "nothing short of brilliance", Andrew Overfield, writing for The Sound Architect, wrote: "The music brings to the ears a blend of chaos, frenzy and patriotism without relying heavily on digital elements and hits to emphasise the power and beast that encompasses this critically acclaimed disaster movie."

== Track listing ==
=== Original release ===
No.	Title	Length
1.	"1969 – We Came In Peace"	2:04
2.	"S.E.T.I. – Radio Signal"	1:52
3.	"The Darkest Day"	4:13
4.	"Canceled Leave"	1:45
5.	"Evacuation"	5:47
6.	"Fire Storm"	1:23
7.	"Aftermath"	3:35
8.	"Base Attack"	6:11
9.	"El Toro Destroyed"	1:30
10.	"International Code"	1:32
11.	"The President's Speech"	3:10
12.	"The Day We Fight Back"	4:58
13.	"Jolly Roger"	3:15
14.	"End Titles"	9:08
Total length:		50:23

=== La-La Land Records re-issue ===
Disc 1
No.	Title	Length
1.	"1969 – We Came In Peace"	2:01
2.	"S.E.T.I. – Radio Signal"	1:52
3.	"Mysto Bridge / Satellite Collision / Destroyers Disengage / Russell Casse – Pilot"	2:16
4.	"First Sighting / AWAC Attack"	2:18
5.	"The Darkest Day"	4:13
6.	"Moving Day / Countdown"	2:11
7.	"Cancelled Leave"	1:46
8.	"Commence Lift-off / Parabolic Indenwhat?"	1:17
9.	"Evacuation"	5:47
10.	"Firestorm"	1:24
11.	"Aftermath"	3:36
12.	"Base Attack"	6:12
13.	"Marilyn Found"	1:30
14.	"Area 51 / The Big Tamale / Formaldehyde Freak Show"	4:11
15.	"El Toro Destroyed"	1:31
16.	"Slimey Wakes Up"	5:23
17.	"Target Remains / Rescue"	5:56
18.	"The Death Of Marilyn / Dad's A Genius"	3:33
19.	"Alien Ship Powers Up"	1:46
20.	"International Code"	1:33
21.	"Wedding"	1:50
22.	"The President's Speech"	3:11
Total length:		65:17

Disc 2
No.	Title	Length
1.	"Just In Case / Attacker Fires Up"	3:11
2.	"The Launch Tunnel / Mutha Ship / Virus Uploaded"	8:27
3.	"Hide! / Russell's Packin' (The Day We Fight Back)"	4:44
4.	"He Did It"	1:34
5.	"Jolly Roger"	3:17
6.	"Victory"	3:41
7.	"End Credits"	9:12
8.	"1969: We Came In Peace – Alternative"	2:06
9.	"Destroyers Disengage (No Choir)"	0:34
10.	"Cancelled Leave – Alternative"	1:44
11.	"Commence Lift-Off – Alternative"	0:55
12.	"Base Attack (Segment – Film Version)"	2:27
13.	"Marilyn Found (No Choir)"	1:29
14.	"Target Remains / Rescue – Alternative"	2:41
15.	"Dad's A Genius – Alternative"	0:45
16.	"Attacker Fires Up (Original Version)"	2:01
17.	"Virus Uploaded – Alternative"	2:35
18.	"The Day We Fight Back (Original Version)"	5:49
19.	"Jolly Roger – Alternative"	3:22
20.	"End Credits (Segment – No Choir)"	2:47
Total length:		63:21

== Personnel ==
Credits adapted from CD liner notes.

Production

- Music composed and produced by – David Arnold
- Orchestrated and conducted by – Nicholas Dodd
- Recorded and mixed by– Dennis Sands
- Mastered by – Joe Gastwirt
- Supervising music editor – Laurie Higgins Tobias
- Additional music editor – Daniel Gaber, Doug Lackey
- Assistant music editor – Neil S. Bulk
- Music contractor – Debbi Datz-Pyle, Patti Zimmitti
- Copyist – Barbara Watts, Conrad Pope, Craig Ware, Daniel Gold, Deborah Mitchell, Deborah Richman, Doug Dana, Elizabeth Finch, Ellen Gray, Howard Segurson, James Surell, James Weisheit, Jim Hoffman, Jo Ann Kane, Joanna Beck, John Eidsvoog, Jon Marquardt, Julie Eidsvoog, Katherine Fields, Kenneth Gruberman, Kenneth Fix 2, Ladd McIntosh, Larry Rench, Lars Clutterham, Leland Bond, Nicholas Dodd, Phil Azelton, Richard Bronskill, Robert Calderwood, Roberta McIntosh, Ron Gorow, Russell Bartmus, Soon-Ping Tang, Steve Fowler, Steven Smith, Thomas Brown, Tom Calderaro, Vince Bartold, William Francis, William Motzing

Management

- Legal acquisition for Sony Music – Vinny Tabone
- Sales representative for Sony Music – Gina Aciares
- Soundtrack executive for Twentieth Century Fox – Tom Cavanaugh
- Vice president, custom marketing for Sony Music – Doug Wygal
- Executive producer for Sony Music Entertainment – Didier C. Deutsch
- Product management for Sony Music – Robin Manning
- Music supervision for Twentieth Century Fox – Robert Kraft
- A&R – Bill Rosenfield

Cover artwork

- Art direction – Richard Dombrowski
- Liner notes – Dan Goldwasser

Performers

- Bassoon – Allen Savedoff, David Riddles, Ronald Jannelli, Rose Corrigan
- Cello – Armen Ksajikian, Barry Gold, Christina Soule, Christine Ermacoff, Dane Little, David Shamban, Dennis Karmazyn, Frederick Seykora, Jodi Burnett, Larry Corbett, Miguel Martinez, Paula Hochhalter, Robert L. Adcock, Rowena Hammill, Steve Erdody, Timothy Landauer, Todd Hemmenway, Vage Ayrikyan
- Choir – Albert Eddy, Aleta Braxton, Amy Fogerson, Andre Furtivo, Barbara Durham, Barbara Lee, Burman Timberlake, David Schnell, Diana Kahn, Dwayne Condon, Edward Levy, Eileen Holt, Elin Carlson, Elissa Johnston, G. Edward Bruner, George Sterne, Gordon Goodman, Howard Drollinger, Holly Ristuccia, Joseph Golightly, Leanna Brand, Leilani Jones Wilmore, Lesley Leighton, Linda Sauer, Linda St. George, Mallor Walker, Marie Hodgson, Martha Cowan, Marti Pia, Meredith Salamunovich, Mervyn Warren, Michael Horton, Michelle Fournier, Nancy Sulahian, Nicole Baker, Pamela Hall, Paul Salamunovich, Paula Mandros, Robert Lewis, Sarah Bloxham, Sarona Sowa, Stephen Grimm, Tim Hewitt, Vance Wilson, Vicky Brown, Virenia Lind
- Clarinet – Charles Boito, Gary Bovyer, Gary Gray, Ralph Williams
- Double bass – Ann Atkinson, Bruce Morgenthaler, Buell Neidlinger, Christian Kollgaard, Chris Hanulik, Donald V. Ferrone, Drew Dembowski, Ed Meares, Frances Wu, Ian Walker, Margaret Storer, Nico Abondolo, Oscar Hidalgo, Richard Feves, Susan Ranney
- Drums – Robert Zimmitti, Daniel Greco, Don Williams, Emil Radocchia, Joe Porcaro, Michael Fisher, Peter Limonick, Steve Schaeffer, Thomas Raney
- Flute – David Shostac, Geraldine Rotella, Louise Di Tullio, Sheridon Stokes
- French horn – Brad Warnaar, Brian O'Connor, Daniel Kelley, David Duke, James Thatcher, Jeffrey De Rosa, Jerry Folsom, John A. Reynolds, Kurt Snyder, Mark Adams, Marilyn Johnson, Phil Yao, Richard Todd, Steve Becknell
- Harp – Amy Shulman, Katie Kirkpatrick, Susan Allen
- Keyboards – Chet Swiatkowski, Michael Lang, Ralph Grierson, Randy Kerber
- Oboe – Barbara Northcutt, Earle Dumler, Jon Clarke, Thomas Boyd
- Trombone – Alan Kaplan, Alexander Iles, William Reichenbach, Robert Sanders, Charles Loper, Lew McCreary, Phil Teele, Steven Holtman, Steven Williams
- Trumpet – Jon Lewis, Malcolm McNab, Rick Baptist
- Tuba – Tommy Johnson
- Viola – Andrew Picken, Brian Dembow, Carole Castillo, Carrie Holzman-Little, Dan Neufeld, Denyse Buffum, Dmitri Bovaird, Donald McInnes, Harry Shirinian, Janet Lakatos, John Scanlon, Jorge Moraga, Keith Greene, Kenneth Burward-Hoy, Marlow Fisher, Matthew Funes, Raymond Tischer II, Rick Gerding, Robert Becker, Roland Kato
- Violin – Alan Grunfeld, Anatoly Rosinsky, Barbra Porter, Berj Garabedian, Bruce Dukov, Carolyn Osborn, Claudia Parducci, Clayton Haslop, Darius Campo, David Ewart, Dennis Molchan, Diana Halprin, Dimitrie Leivici, Endre Granat, Eve Sprecher, Ezra Kliger, Gil Romero, Gwenn Heller, Haim Shtrum, Horia Moroaica, Jacqueline Brand, Jay Rosen, Jennifer Bellusci, Joel Derouin, Julie Gigante, Karen Jones, Kathleen Lenski, Katia Popov, Kwihee Shamban, Lily Ho Chen, Margaret Batjer, Mari Tsumura, Michael Markman, Miran Kojian, Norman Hughes, Patricia Johnson, Peter Kent, Rachel Robinson, Ralph Morrisson, Razdan Kuyumjian, Rebecca Barr, Rene Mandel, Richard Altenbach, Robin Olson, Ron Clark, Sheldon Sanov, Tamara Hatwan, Tiffany Yi Hu

== Accolades ==
Award	Subject	Nominee	Result
Saturn Awards	Best Music	David Arnold	Nominated
Grammy Awards	Best Instrumental Composition Written for a Motion Picture or for Television	David Arnold	Won
International Film Music Critics Association	Best Archival Release of an Existing Score – Re-Release or Re-Recording	David Arnold, Didier C. Deutsch, MV Gerhard, Mike Matessino, Nick Redman, Matt Verboys, Mark Banning, Dan Goldwasser	Nominated
Universe Reader's Choice Awards	Best Score	David Arnold	Won
