= Independence Day: Resurgence =

2016 film by Roland Emmerich

- Theatrical release poster
- Directed by: Roland Emmerich
- Screenplay by: Nicolas Wright; James A. Woods; Dean Devlin; Roland Emmerich; James Vanderbilt
- Story by: Dean Devlin; Roland Emmerich; Nicolas Wright; James A. Woods
- Based on: Characters by: Dean Devlin; Roland Emmerich
- Produced by: Dean Devlin; Harald Kloser; Roland Emmerich
- Starring: Liam Hemsworth; Jeff Goldblum; Bill Pullman; Maika Monroe; Jessie T. Usher; Travis Tope; William Fichtner; Charlotte Gainsbourg; Judd Hirsch
- Cinematography: Markus Förderer
- Edited by: Adam Wolfe
- Music by: Thomas Wander; Harald Kloser
- Production companies: 20th Century Fox; Centropolis Entertainment; Electric Entertainment
- Distributed by: 20th Century Fox
- Release dates: June 20, 2016 (TCL Chinese Theatre); June 24, 2016 (United States)
- Running time: 120 minutes
- Country: United States
- Language: English
- Budget: $165 million
- Box office: $389.6 million

Independence Day: Resurgence is a 2016 American science fiction action film co-written, directed, and produced by Roland Emmerich and co-written and co-produced by Dean Devlin, serving as a standalone sequel to Independence Day (1996). It stars an ensemble cast that consists of Liam Hemsworth, Jeff Goldblum, Bill Pullman, Maika Monroe, Jessie T. Usher, Travis Tope, William Fichtner, Charlotte Gainsbourg, and Judd Hirsch. The film takes place twenty years after the events of the first film, during which the United Nations has collaborated to form the Earth Space Defense, an international military defense and research organization. Through reverse engineering, the world has fused the power of alien technology with humanity's and laid the groundwork to resist a second invasion.

Plans for a sequel to Independence Day began as early as 2001, with 20th Century Fox eventually green-lighting the project in 2014. Principal photography began in April 2015 at locations primarily in New Mexico but also in the Bonneville Salt Flats of Utah, which were featured in the original. This was one of Robert Loggia's final projects before he died, and the film is dedicated in memory of him and he is commemorated during its closing credits.

Independence Day: Resurgence was released by 20th Century Fox in the United States on June 24, 2016, twenty years after the release of Independence Day, in 2D, 3D, and IMAX 3D. It received generally negative reviews from critics, who criticized the lack of screenplay, its plot, and lack of emotional depth but praised the visual effects. It was considered a financial disappointment, grossing $389.6 million worldwide at the box office against its $165 million budget. Following the film's release, director Emmerich openly expressed his dissatisfaction with the completed film, as he regretted making it without Will Smith's involvement as Smith was one of the central protagonists in the first film.

== Plot ==
In the twenty years after the War of 1996, (Note: As depicted in Independence Day (1996).) the United Nations has founded the Earth Space Defense (ESD), a global defense program using reverse-engineered alien technology and serves as Earth's defense force against extraterrestrial threats. Civilization has been restored, and relative peace among nations exists following the human race's victory over the aliens' attacks. The ESD set up bases from Area 51 to the Moon, Mars, and Rhea, and orbital defense satellites above Earth, as fortifications against future invasions.

ESD Director David Levinson meets with warlord Dikembe Umbutu and Dr. Catherine Marceaux in the African state République Nationale d'Umbutu. They travel to a landed alien saucer and discover that the aliens were drilling before sending a distress signal to their homeworld before their defeat. It is revealed that people such as former U.S. President Thomas Whitmore, Dr. Brackish Okun, and Umbutu are telepathically linked to the aliens' collective consciousness, following personal encounters, and have visions of an unidentified spherical object.

An unidentified spherical ship emerges from a wormhole near Earth's Moon. Despite objections from Levinson, the United Nations Security Council orders the ship to be destroyed. Defying orders, American pilots Jake Morrison and Charlie Miller then collect Levinson, Marceaux, Umbutu, and U.S. federal controller Floyd Rosenberg on a space tug. They head for the wreckage in the Van de Graaff crater, where they recover a large container holding a sphere. An alien mothership, over 3,000 miles in diameter, suddenly appears after responding to the distress call, and proceeds to destroy much of Earth's planetary defense systems before landing over the North Atlantic Ocean where it starts to drill down toward Earth's core for fuel that will destroy the planet in the process. Narrowly escaping death, the space tug avoids capture and returns to Area 51.

Whitmore, Levinson, and U.S. General Joshua Adams's groups interrogate one of the aliens held in captivity at Area 51's prison facility from the war. They learn that the aliens exist in a hivemind and that one of their colossal Queens is commanding the invasion. Realizing that they had killed a supervising Queen above Earth during the first invasion, Levinson hypothesizes that if they kill this one, her forces will cease drilling and go dormant. An ESD aerial fleet led by Captain Dylan Hiller stages a counterattack, but they are ambushed within the mothership, leaving only a few survivors, including Dylan, Jake, Charlie, and fellow ESD lieutenant and Chinese pilot Rain Lao.

In Area 51, Okun opens the rescued container and releases a giant white sphere containing a virtual intelligence. The sphere reveals that her mission is to evacuate survivors to a planet of refugees from other worlds targeted by the aliens, whom she calls "Harvesters", and unite them in an attack on the Harvesters' planet. In the mothership, all surviving ESD pilots manage to escape by hijacking enemy craft; Dylan, Jake, Charlie, and Rain navigate two Harvester fighters to pursue the Queen's personal ship, which is heading to Area 51 to extract information from the sphere about the refugee planet.

Knowing that the Harvester Queen has become aware of the sphere's location, the ESD hides her in an isolation chamber and uses a decoy in Jake's space tug to lure the Harvester Queen's ship into a trap. Whitmore volunteers to pilot the transport ship on a suicide mission, leading the Queen's ship into the trap before detonating a bomb, thus destroying the enemy ship by sacrificing himself. However, the Harvester Queen survives by using an energy shield of her own and another battle ensues, leading to the Harvester Queen finally being killed. Then all the remaining alien fighters are rendered inactive while the mothership stops drilling and retreats to space.

Okun reveals that the sphere has asked humanity to lead her resistance in preparation for an attack on the Harvesters' homeworld.

== Cast ==
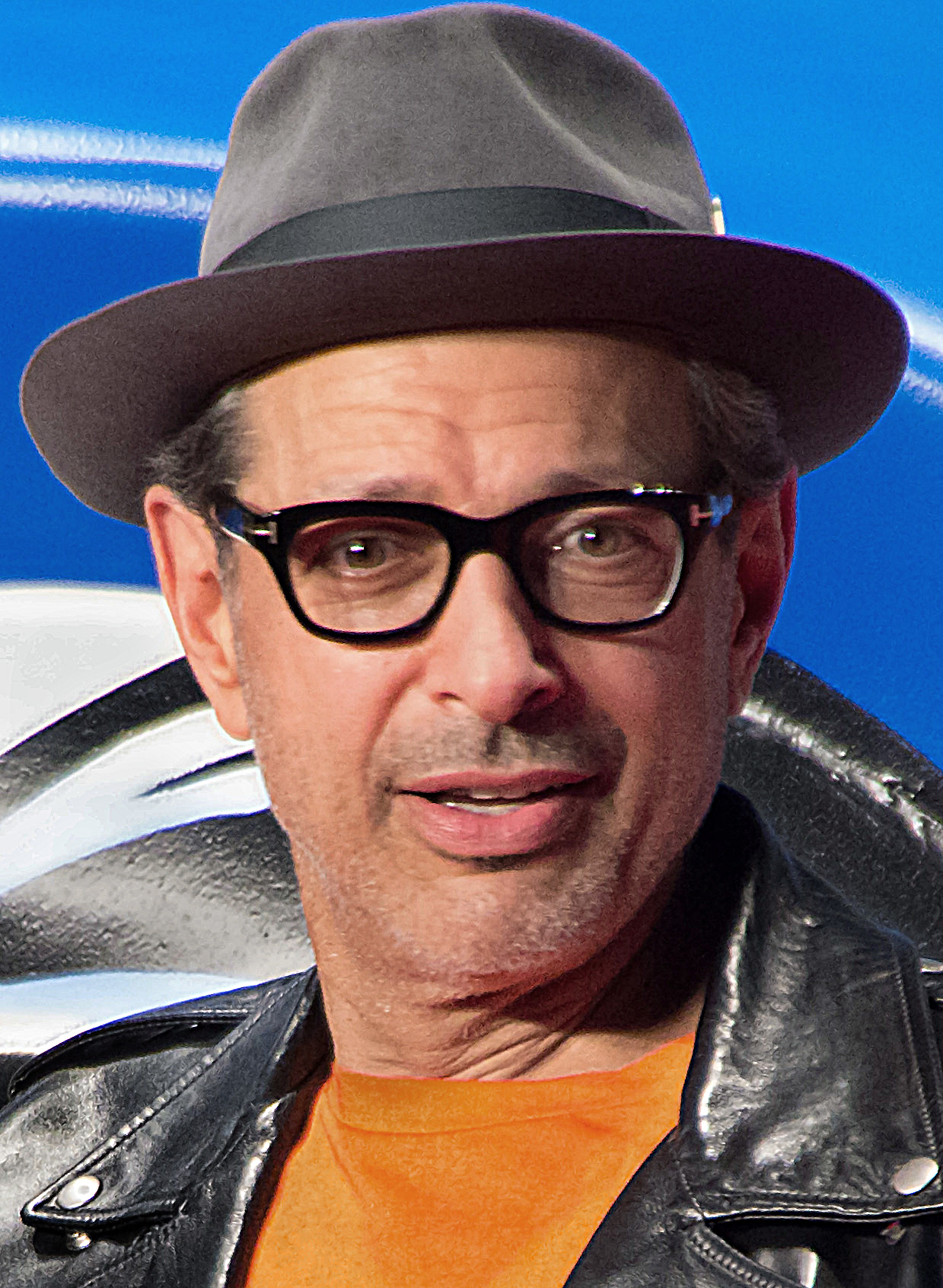
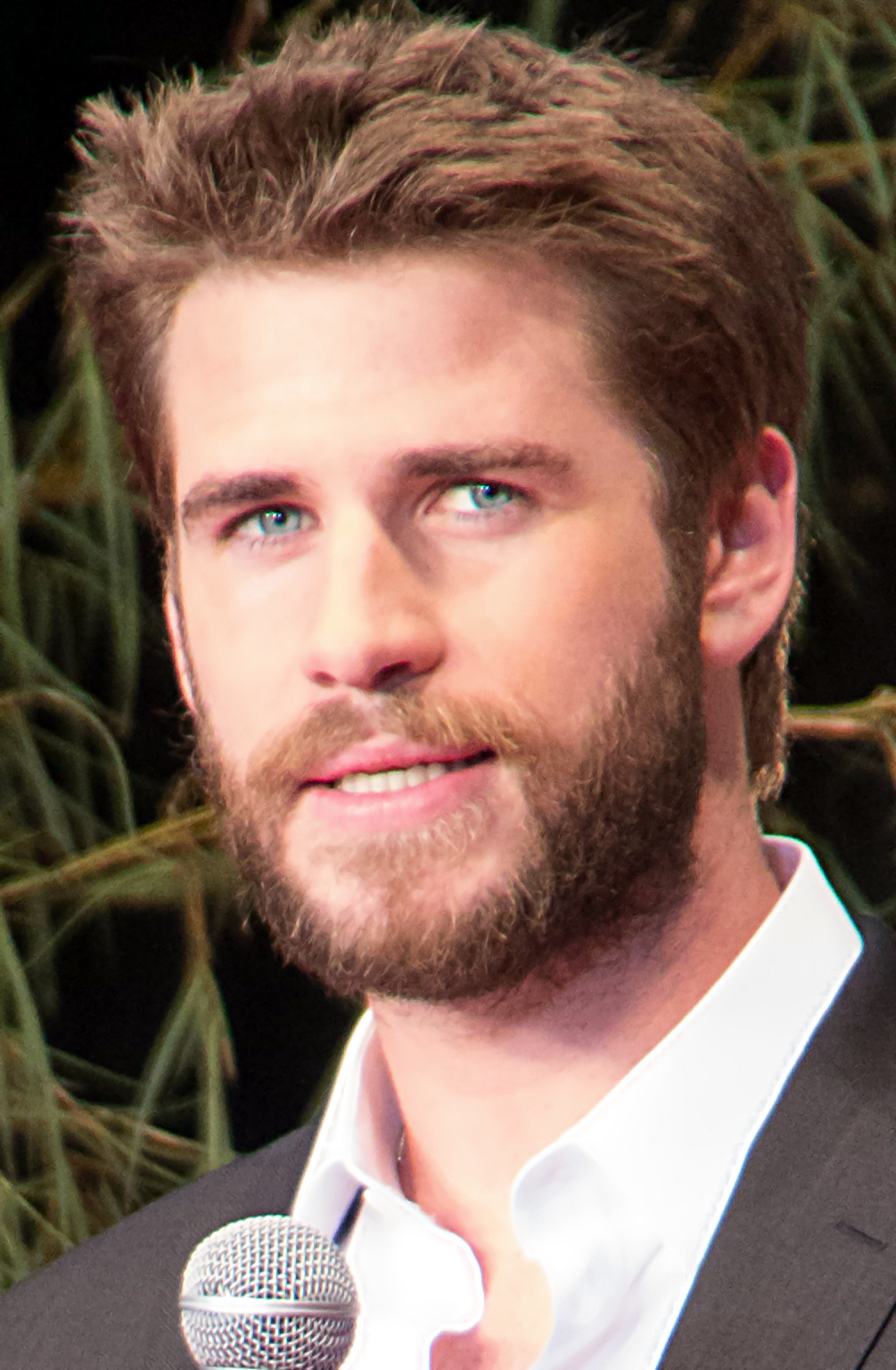
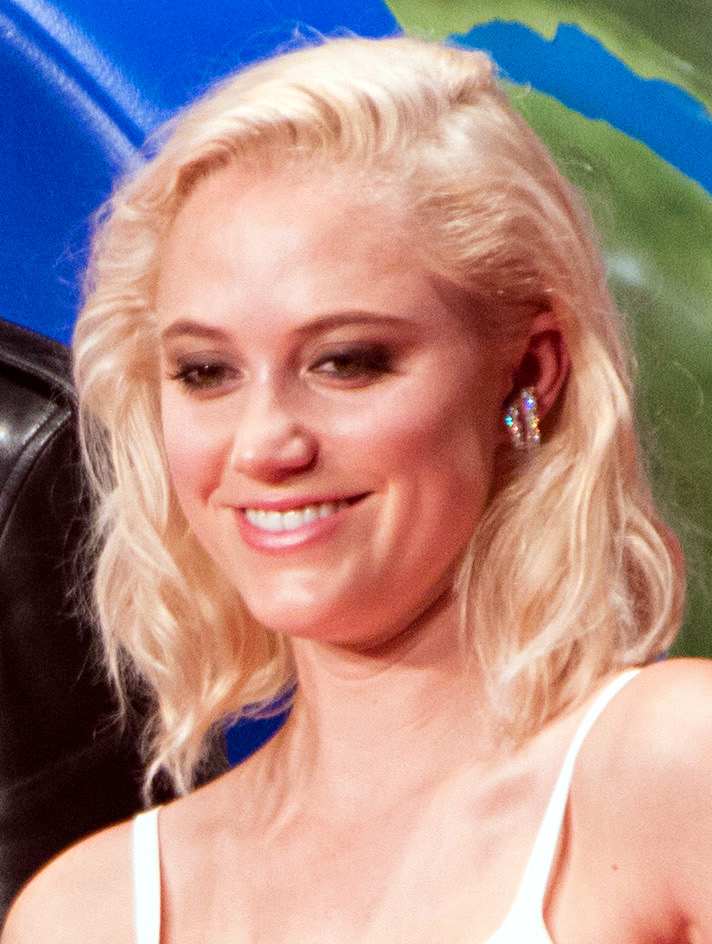
Jeff Goldblum, Liam Hemsworth and Maika Monroe at the film's premiere in Japan in June 2016.
- Liam Hemsworth as Jake Morrison, a pilot of the Earth Space Defense and Patricia Whitmore's fiancé who lost his parents when the aliens first attacked.
- Jeff Goldblum as David Levinson, the director of the Earth Space Defense and the United States government's leading researcher on extraterrestrial technology who played a part in defeating the aliens in the last film.
- Bill Pullman as President Thomas J. Whitmore, the former President of the United States who is highly revered by the country as a world-saving war hero, but the fights against the aliens have left Whitmore with post-traumatic stress disorder and permanently psychically linked to the enemy.
- Maika Monroe as Patricia Whitmore, the daughter of Thomas Whitmore who was inspired by her father to follow in his footsteps as a combat pilot and dedicates her military career to the memory of her mother Marilyn. She was previously portrayed by Mae Whitman in the first film.
- Jessie T. Usher as Dylan Hiller, the stepson of the legendary Captain Steven Hiller and captain of the Earth Space Defense. He was previously portrayed by Ross Bagley in the first film. Captain Steven Hiller was portrayed by Will Smith in the first film and was mentioned to have perished trying out one of the hybrid fighter prototypes.
- Travis Tope as Charlie Miller, a lieutenant in the Earth Space Defense and friend of Jake, who also lost his family when the aliens first attacked.
- William Fichtner as General Joshua T. Adams, the United States Air Force General and the Chairman of the Joint Chiefs of Staff who later succeeds President Elizabeth Lanford as the new acting President of the United States.
- Charlotte Gainsbourg as Dr. Catherine Marceaux, a French psychiatrist researching telepathic connections between humans and aliens, and David Levinson's romantic partner after his wife Constance died before the events of the film.
- Judd Hirsch as Julius Levinson, a retired rabbi, David Levinson's father, and the author of the book How I Saved the World that narrates events of the first invasion from his experiences and perspectives.
- Brent Spiner as Dr. Brackish Okun, the director of research at Area 51. Dr. Okun had spent the past 20 years in a coma after what happened in the last film.
- Sela Ward as President Elizabeth Lanford, the President of the United States. She lost her family during the first invasion and this loss made her suspicious of anything coming from space.
- Angelababy as Rain Lao, a Chinese lieutenant in the Earth Space Defense and Dylan Hiller's second-in-command of the Legacy Squadron who also lost her parents when the aliens first attacked and was adopted by her father's younger brother Jiang Lao.
- Joey King as Sam Blackwell, the oldest of the Blackwell siblings who finds Julius.
- Vivica A. Fox as Dr. Jasmine Dubrow-Hiller, Dylan's mother and the widow of Steven Hiller.
- Robert Loggia as General William Grey, the retired Commander of the Space Command.
- Nicolas Wright as Floyd Rosenberg, a U.S. federal controller assigned to David Levinson and seeks to join the fight against the aliens with the Earth Space Defense.
- DeObia Oparei as Dikembe Umbutu, the Congolese warlord of the National Republic of Umbutu.
- Chin Han as Jiang Lao, the Chinese general and commander of the Earth Space Defense's Moon base and Rain Lao's paternal uncle and adoptive father.
- Patrick St. Esprit as Reese Tanner, the United States Secretary of Defense in President Lanford's cabinet.
- Gbenga Akinnagbe as Agent Matthew Travis, a United States Secret Service agent assigned to former President Thomas Whitmore.
- John Storey as Milton Isaacs.
- James A. Woods as Lieutenant James Ritter, a subordinate of General Joshua Adams.
- Mckenna Grace as Daisy Blackwell, Sam's sister.
- Garrett Wareing as Bobby Blackwell, Sam's brother.
- Hays Wellford as Felix Blackwell, Sam's brother.

== Production ==
=== Development ===
The film's logo

The possibility of a sequel to Independence Day (1996) had been discussed as early as 2001, and the film's producer and writer, Dean Devlin, once stated that the world's reaction to the September 11 attacks influenced him to strongly consider making a sequel to the film. Devlin began writing an outline for a script with Emmerich, but in May 2004 during the release of The Day After Tomorrow (2004), Emmerich said he and Devlin had attempted to "figure out a way how to continue the story", but that this ultimately did not work, and the pair abandoned the idea. In October 2009, Emmerich said he once again had plans for a sequel, and had since considered the idea of making two sequels to form a trilogy. On June 24, 2011, Devlin confirmed that he and Emmerich had found an idea for the sequels and had written a treatment for it. In October 2011, however, discussions for Will Smith returning were halted, due to Fox's refusal to provide the $50 million salary demanded by Smith for the two sequels. Emmerich, however, made assurances that the films would be shot back-to-back, regardless of Smith's involvement. In July 2012, Devlin reiterated that the Independence Day sequel was still in development, and the script would take place in 2012, 16 years after the original film's events.

In March 2013, Emmerich stated that the titles of the new films would be ID: Forever – Part I and ID: Forever – Part II. The films will take place twenty years after the original, when reinforcements of the original alien species arrive at Earth after finally receiving a distress call. The new films will focus on the next generation of heroes, including the stepson of Smith's character in the original film. In May 2013, Emmerich and Devlin mentioned that wormholes would be used as a plot device in ID: Forever. The following month, Devlin and Emmerich brought in the latter's White House Down (2013) collaborator James Vanderbilt to revise their previous draft. By February 2014, Vanderbilt had written two variations of the script: one featuring Smith's character in the lead and one with Smith cut out completely. On May 29, 2014, it was announced that the script for the first sequel written by Emmerich and Devlin would be rewritten by Carter Blanchard. The script was delivered to Fox along with twenty previsualization shots produced under effects supervisor Volker Engel, a long-time collaborator of Emmerich. On November 26, 2014, Deadline confirmed that Fox had greenlit the single film, and they were in talks with Emmerich to direct the film, while casting was reported to begin after Emmerich's confirmation. Writing duo James A. Woods and Nicolas Wright, who were working with Emmerich on a remake of Stargate (1997) at the same time, wrote the final draft of the script that resulted in the film getting officially greenlit. The full title, Independence Day: Resurgence, was revealed on June 22, 2015. Returns, Retaliation, Rises, and Requiem were all considered too along with the title before settling with Resurgence. Emmerich explained that in the sequel, the alien invaders that were likened in the original to locusts "are more like bees", with a hive mentality and only interested in multiplying, "and when they arrive it's more like a natural disaster than an invasion."

=== Casting ===
Early on, both Emmerich and Devlin hoped that Smith would return. However, in June 2013, Emmerich announced that Smith would not be returning, noting that "he's too expensive." Smith later stated that he declined the role due to scheduling conflicts with Suicide Squad (2016), also in production at the time. Smith's absence in the movie is explained with the death of his character, Steven Hiller, who had been promoted to colonel, 11 years after the events of the first film when personally testing the first experimental prototype fighter designed with alien technology for the ESD. Later in June, it was officially confirmed that both Goldblum and Pullman would return in the sequel, and that a gay character would be featured.

On January 27, 2015, casting began with Fox offering the lead role to Liam Hemsworth. French-British actress Charlotte Gainsbourg was in talks to join the film's cast, revealed by THR on March 20, 2015. Newcomer Travis Tope was set on March 25, 2015, to play the role of Charlie. On March 3, 2015, Jessie Usher was added to the cast to portray the role of the stepson of Smith's character. Jeff Goldblum and Bill Pullman were also set to reprise their roles from the previous film. On March 24, 2015, Emmerich confirmed via Twitter that Vivica A. Fox would reprise the role of Jasmine Dubrow, her character from the previous film. Maika Monroe signed on to star in the film on April 27, 2015. She would play the daughter of the former president after Mae Whitman, who played the character in the original movie, declined to read for the part, according to Emmerich, though other sources indicate there might have been other reasons involved. Monroe was selected from a shortlist that included Gabriella Wilde, Britt Robertson, Merritt Patterson and Lucy Boynton. Sela Ward's casting as the new President of the United States was confirmed on May 4, 2015. On May 13, 2015, Mckenna Grace also joined the film to play Daisy. On May 19, 2015, Patrick St. Esprit was cast as Secretary of Defense Tanner. On May 29, 2015, William Fichtner was cast as a General, a role that is planned to be larger if more films are made. The casting of Angelababy was announced on Twitter by Emmerich on June 3, 2015.

=== Filming ===
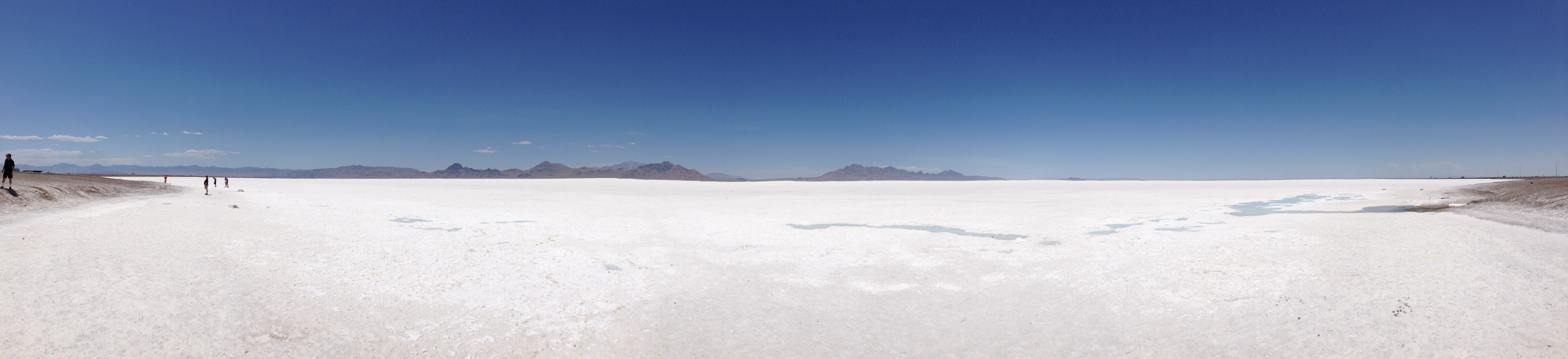
The climactic battle scene was filmed at Bonneville Salt Flats in Utah where parts of the original film were also shot.

Filming began on April 20, 2015, and wrapped on August 22, 2015. Filming for additional scenes also took place in early 2016 in Los Angeles. Some scenes were also filmed in West Wendover, Nevada, London, at the Burj Khalifa in Dubai, and Singapore's Marina Bay Sands. Due to the availability of regional filming, the producers decided to shoot the film largely in New Mexico. Moreover, the state offers a 25% movie tax credit. However, while location filming did take place in rural New Mexico and further north on the Utah and Nevada border, most of the shooting was studio-based. Albuquerque Studios was a major venue for the film. The film was shot in 6K resolution with Red Epic Dragon cameras and Hawk anamorphic lenses, and was later stereo converted to 3D.

Emmerich decided to return to the Bonneville Salt Flats in Utah, which he said he fell in love with while looking for a unique location for shooting the first film. However, problems cropped up as Emmerich was slightly disappointed by the nature and color of the area. This was because, before the arrival of the crew, a windstorm had occurred around the area, which blew a lot of dirt into the salt and subsequently turned it into a shade of beige.

The filmmakers refrained from shooting in India or portraying any prominent Indian monuments as being damaged to avoid potential protests and legal action from Indian religious groups and activists. Originally, parts of Dubai were planned to fall on Paris in the scene depicting the mothership destroying Europe while using Asian monuments pulled out by its gravitational pull. However, following the November 2015 Paris attacks, filmmakers reconsidered and instead had landmarks of Dubai fall on London. Emmerich said, "After the attacks, we felt it wasn't right to have the Burj Khalifa crashing on the Eiffel Tower, so we dumped it on the London Eye instead. The English can take it."

=== Visual effects and design ===
Like the original Independence Day, Resurgence had its visual effects led by supervisor Volker Engel and producer Marc Weigert from Uncharted Territory, LLC. Like with White House Down, the Ncam camera tracking system was used on set to provide animation previews to the cast and crew and gather data for the effects companies. While the original film relied heavily on miniatures and Engel wanted them on at least one scene, the effects were mostly computer-generated "which was pretty much less than half of the budget". Uncharted Territory, along with coordinating the overall efforts of 15 effects houses, was the leading company with 268 shots, created in a tight collaboration with the film's art department. Scanline VFX was the first vendor hired, and handled the mothership landing, which included creating detailed models of London and Singapore out of thousands of reference photographs and even Lidar scans to realistically destroy both cities. Weta Digital was mainly responsible for the design of the aliens and carrying out the climactic battle scene.

== Music ==
Independence Day: Resurgence (Original Motion Picture Soundtrack)

Soundtrack album / Film score by Thomas Wander and Harald Kloser
- Released: June 17, 2016
- Recorded: 2016
- Genres: Film soundtrack Film score
- Length: 51:14
- Labels: Sony Classical; Fox Music
- Producers: Thomas Wander; Harald Kloser

Independence Day chronology
Independence Day (1996)	Independence Day: Resurgence (2016)

Thomas Wander and Harald Kloser chronology
White House Down (2013)	Independence Day: Resurgence (Original Motion Picture Soundtrack) (2016)	Midway (2019)

Singles from Independence Day: Resurgence (Original Motion Picture Soundtrack)
- 1. "Electric U" Released: June 17, 2016; 2. "Bang Bang (My Baby Shot Me Down)" Released: June 17, 2016

The film's music was composed by Thomas Wander and Harald Kloser. The soundtrack also contains "Electric U", performed by Kid Bloom and "Bang Bang (My Baby Shot Me Down)", performed by Annie Trousseau. The soundtrack was released on June 17, 2016, by Sony Classical and Fox Music. Much of the themes and style of David Arnold, who worked on the score for the first film, was kept.

All music is composed by Thomas Wander and Harald Kloser, except "Electric U" and "Bang Bang (My Baby Shot Me Down)".

No.	Title	Length
1.	"Traveling Through Space"	1:26
2.	"Great Speech"	1:37
3.	"Hostile Territory"	1:23
4.	"How Did They Get the Lights On?"	1:13
5.	"Inside the African Ship"	1:22
6.	"More Stimulation"	1:50
7.	"Fear"	2:06
8.	"The Friendly Spaceship"	3:18
9.	"The Only Family I Got"	1:01
10.	"Welcome to the Moon"	1:17
11.	"What Goes Up"	2:11
12.	"It's Getting Real"	3:06
13.	"Flying Inside"	2:00
14.	"It's a Trap"	2:36
15.	"Worth Fighting For"	1:12
16.	"The Sphere"	3:37
17.	"The Queen is Leaving"	1:09
18.	"Whitmore's Choice"	1:59
19.	"Humanity's Last Stand"	1:10
20.	"Bus Chase"	3:08
21.	"We are Rich"	1:05
22.	"Independence Day: Resurgence Finale"	3:14
23.	"ID4 Reprise" (composed by David Arnold)	2:27
24.	"Electric U" (performed by Kid Bloom)	2:50
25.	"Bang Bang (My Baby Shot Me Down)" (performed by Annie Trousseau)	2:57
Total length:		51:14

== Marketing ==
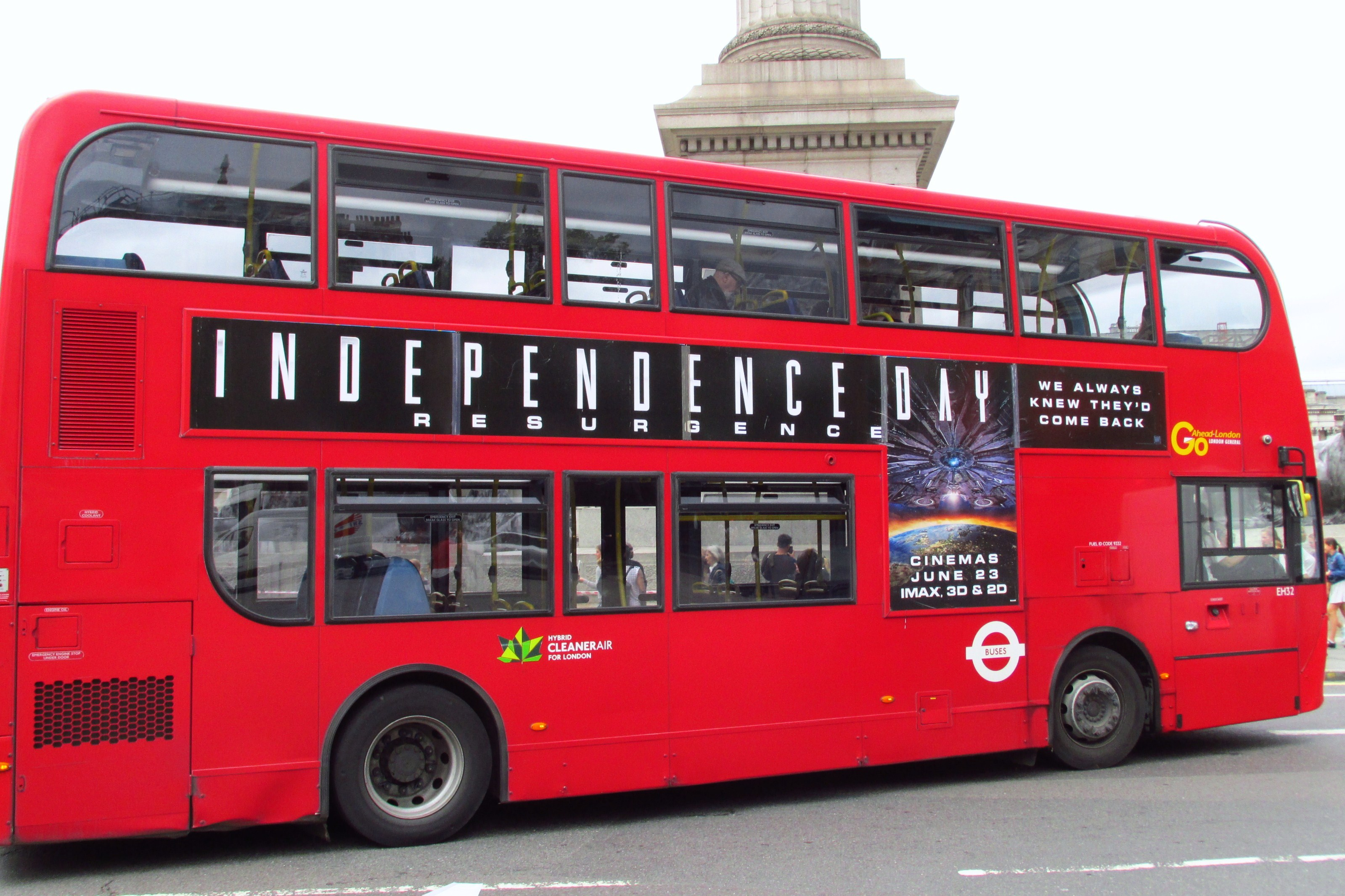
An advertisement for the film on a double decker bus in London

Titan Books published several tie-in books for the film, including novels and comics. The first, an omnibus of Stephen Molstad's three Independence Day novels, Silent Zone, War in the Desert, and the novelization of Independence Day, was released on March 19, 2016. The second, Independence Day: Crucible, was written by Greg Keyes. Crucible serves as a prequel to the film and was published on May 24, 2016. A novelization of Independence Day: Resurgence by Alex Irvine followed on June 21 before the film's release and it differs from the film in that the character of the President survives most of the alien conflict as a prisoner of the Harvester Queen and is killed when the ship is destroyed, instead of being killed when the aliens attack the fortified bunker in Colorado. It also reveals – in POV exposition, during the scene where the Queen captures the sphere – that the sphere aliens are responsible for the creation of the Harvester aliens, who turned on them and wiped them out, though this plot device is not further explored in the book. Titan Comics started a six issue comic book miniseries, Independence Day: Dark Fathom, written by Victor Gischler, with art by Steve Scott (#1-2), Alex Shibao (#3-4) and Tazio Bettin (#4-5), which serves as a prequel set between the first and second films, and which began its run on March 23 and ended on June 15.

On December 13, 2015, the first trailer was released by 20th Century Fox. A TV spot was shown during Super Bowl 50 on February 7, 2016. A commercial for the U.S. Army aired promoting the film by presenting itself as a commercial for the ESD, or Earth Space Defense, a fictional military faction dedicated to defending the Earth against any further alien invasion.

In June 2016, 20th Century Fox's British division collaborated with Manchester United, of which 20th Century Fox is the official film partner, for a commercial featuring Jeff Goldblum and Angelababy, and guest-starring United players Chris Smalling, Daley Blind, Ashley Young, Juan Mata and captain Wayne Rooney as fighter pilots.

In Japan, 20th Century Fox collaborated with Sunrise to cross-promote the film with Mobile Suit Gundam Unicorn. One of the film's posters has the Statue of Liberty replaced with the RX-0 Unicorn Gundam aiming at the alien mothership, while a TV spot features commentary by Gundam Unicorn characters Banagher Links and Full Frontal.

== Release ==
=== Theatrical ===
Independence Day: Resurgence premiered at the TCL Chinese Theatre in Los Angeles on June 20, 2016. The film was originally going to be released on July 3, 2015 but on November 12, 2013, it was announced that the sequel had been rescheduled for a July 2016 release. On October 14, 2014, Fox changed the release date to June 24, 2016. It was released in certain formats such as 3D, IMAX 3D, and premium large formats.

=== Home media ===
Independence Day: Resurgence was released on Digital HD on September 27, 2016, and on Blu-ray 3D, Blu-ray and DVD on October 18, 2016, by 20th Century Fox Home Entertainment. It topped the No. 1 spot in the Blu-ray Disc sales charts.

== Reception ==
=== Box office ===
Independence Day: Resurgence was unable to replicate the success of its predecessor, which grossed $817.4 million worldwide in 1996. It was not one of the top-grossing films of 2016 nor even of its month of release, due to Finding Dory (2016) being the highest-grossing film of June. The film also failed to garner much support from China – the world's second biggest movie market – as the cinemagoers there complained about how little screen time there was for Chinese actress Angelababy. Moreover, the film was released in a crowded summer amidst "sequelitis," in which numerous major sequels underperformed. The film has grossed $103.1 million in the United States and Canada and $286.5 million in other territories for a worldwide total of $389.6 million (53% less than the first film), against a production budget of $165 million.

In the United States and Canada, Independence Day: Resurgence was released on June 24, 2016, and was projected to gross $45–65 million in its opening weekend. It opened across 4,130 theaters, which includes 3,242 3D locations, 386 IMAX theaters and 450 premium large format. It made $4 million in Thursday-night previews from 3,200 theaters, and $16.8 million on its first day (including previews), compared to the first film's $11.1 million. In its opening weekend, the film grossed $41 million, less than the $50.2 million debut of the original, finishing in second place at the box office, behind the animated Finding Dory which was on its second week of play. IMAX made up $5 million of the film's opening numbers from 365 theaters. It dropped enormously on its second Friday by 72.1% earning $4.7 million. In its second weekend the film fell by 59.3%, despite the Independence Day holiday frame, earning $16 million. After falling well below studio expectations, it was considered "a box office disappointment" by analysts.

Internationally, the film fared better and was released across 58 countries – 73.5% of its total marketplace – where it earned a five-day total of $99.5 million on 21,872 screens, which fell more or less in line with its $100–150 million opening projections. It took the number one spot in 40 of those markets. It performed exceptionally well in IMAX, where it recorded the biggest IMAX international opening for Fox, with $10.8 million from 533 IMAX theaters, breaking Deadpool's previous record of $8.1 million the same year. In its second weekend, it grossed an additional $39 million from 64 markets and on just under 17,686 screens, down 60% from its first weekend while maintaining the top spot. It topped the international box office for two consecutive weekends before falling into fourth place in its third weekend behind Ice Age: Collision Course, Finding Dory and The Legend of Tarzan.

Its highest international tallies were recorded in China ($37.3 million), Mexico ($11.5 million), South Korea ($7.3 million), the United Kingdom and Ireland ($7.3 million), and Taiwan ($3.7 million). It scored the biggest ever opening for Fox in India with $3.5 million. In United Kingdom and Ireland, it debuted in second place, behind The Secret Life of Pets. Fox also reported "terrific" results across Asia and Latin America, with numerous markets generating the biggest opening weekend ever for a Roland Emmerich film. In Japan, with an opening of $6.4 million, the film recorded the biggest Saturday and Sunday opening for Fox since Star Wars: Episode III – Revenge of the Sith in 2005, besting even Avatar by 5%. In China, where the film received overwhelmingly negative reviews, it managed to record the fourth biggest Fox opening ever and came in second place, behind Now You See Me 2, after a close race between the two. However, it did set the record for the biggest IMAX opening for Fox there, where it took in $6.4 million at 294 IMAX sites, surpassing The Martian. It was expected to earn $90–153 million in China, which could eclipse Emmerich's previous biggest film there, 2012 ($68.6 million). It has grossed a total of $66.15 million in two weeks there.

In terms of total earnings, the biggest markets outside North America are China ($75.3 million), Japan ($25.03 million), Germany ($16.5 million), the United Kingdom ($15.7 million), Mexico ($14.1 million), and South Korea ($11.2 million).

=== Critical response ===
On Rotten Tomatoes, the film holds an approval rating of 29% based on 231 reviews, and an average rating of 4.30/10. The site's critical consensus reads, "It's undeniably visually impressive, but like its predecessor, Independence Day: Resurgence lacks enough emotional heft to support its end-of-the-world narrative stakes." On Metacritic, the film has a weighted average score of 32 out of 100 based on 40 critics, indicating "generally unfavorable" reviews. Audiences polled by CinemaScore gave the film an average grade of "B" on an A+ to F scale.

Richard Roeper gave the film one and a half out of four stars, writing, "The Resurgence blueprint calls for a scene in which characters have human, allegedly humorous and/or touching moments; a scene in which characters plot strategy against the aliens; and a big action sequence in which it's often difficult to tell the difference between the good-guy spaceships and the bad-guy spaceships. Rinse and repeat, rinse and repeat." Mike Ryan of Uproxx gave the film a negative review, saying, "This should be dumb fun. It's just dumb." Peter Bradshaw of The Guardian gave the film 1/5 stars, describing it as a "planet-smashingly boring sci-fi sequel." Dave Palmer of The Reel Deal gave the film 2/10, saying, "The final shot of the film is a set up for another sequel, and I just pray to God aliens come and wipe us out before that day comes." Ignatiy Vishnevetsky of The A.V. Club criticized the film as an example of Hollywood's current business model of "preemptive franchising," stating that "The movie's dips into all-out space opera (interstellar travel, more alien species, etc.) are only meant to get the audience pumped for a movie that doesn't yet exist, making the undistinguished climax seem like a skirmish." Robbie Collin of The Telegraph gave it 2/5 stars, saying it shows "no signs of intelligent life." Sandie Angulo Chen of Common Sense Media says that the film "isn't going to wow anyone who's seen the original," and it may satisfy younger audiences who care about the battle sequences, "but overall this isn't a satisfying sequel."

In a 1/4 rating, Peter Howell of Toronto Star explained that "the film is so cluttered with characters, exposition and space junk, thickly lacquered with 3D, it's like a party piñata waiting to burst open - but inside are rocks, not toys." Dan Jolin of Empire gave the film a positive review, saying it was "spectacular as you'd hope from a sequel to the 1996 planet-toaster, and as amusingly cheesy. You'll enjoy yourself enough that you won't even miss Will Smith." Guy Lodge of Variety gave the film a positive review, calling it "a silly but spectacular sequel". Lucy O'Brien of IGN gave the film an 8/10, saying, "a silly, cheesy, spectacle-driven blockbuster with heart, Independence Day: Resurgence is a refreshing antidote to the grim and the serious sentiment we've seen trending in sci-fi flicks of recent years. While its plot is messy and it's stuffed with too many characters, I dare you not to leave the theatre with a guilt-free smile on your face." Also rating the film an 8/10 was Jack Bottomley of Starburst, who wrote "Emmerich's film is stupid and entertaining and sometimes stupidly entertaining but unlike his misfires 10,000 BC and Godzilla, it realises this fact and embraces it as a facet of the movie's character, taking its popcorn-munching entertainment to ridiculous levels in terms of grand scale and enjoyment." Ealasaid A. Haas of The Mercury News gave the film a mediocre review, saying that "It was okay."

=== Roland Emmerich's assessment ===
In November 2019, while promoting Midway (2019) director Roland Emmerich expressed personal dissatisfaction with the quality of Independence Day: Resurgence stating he "should have stopped" making the film once Will Smith opted out of production to film Suicide Squad (2016) instead. Emmerich stated that his originally intended script in which Steven Hiller (Smith's character from the first film) was alive during the film was "much better" and that Smith's absence from the film forced him to "cobble together" an alternative script.

=== Accolades ===
The film was nominated by the Alliance of Women Film Journalists for Most Egregious Age Difference Between The Lead and The Love Interest Award (for Charlotte Gainsbourg and Jeff Goldblum), and the Remake or Sequel That Shouldn't Have Been Made.

The Houston Film Critics Society in its 2016 awards, nominated it for the Worst Film award. In the 37th ceremony of the Golden Raspberry Awards, the film was nominated for Worst Picture, Worst Director (Roland Emmerich), Worst Screenplay (Nicolas Wright, James A. Woods, Dean Devlin, Roland Emmerich and James Vanderbilt), Worst Supporting Actress (Sela Ward), and Worst Prequel, Remake, Ripoff or Sequel.

List of awards and nominations
Award	Date of ceremony	Category	Recipient(s)	Result	Ref.
Jupiter Awards	March 29, 2017	Best International Film	Independence Day: Resurgence	Won	
Saturn Awards	June 28, 2017	Best Science Fiction Film	Independence Day: Resurgence	Nominated	
Teen Choice Awards	July 31, 2016	Choice Summer Movie	Independence Day: Resurgence	Nominated	
Teen Choice Awards	July 31, 2016	Choice Summer Movie Star: Male	Liam Hemsworth	Nominated	
Visual Effects Society Awards	February 7, 2017	Outstanding Compositing in a Photoreal Feature	"Under the Mothership" – Matthew Giampa, Daniel Lee, Adrian Sutherland and Ed Wilkie	Nominated	

== Future ==
In June 2016, during an interview with Empire magazine, Emmerich stated that a third film could be made, depending on the success of the second one. He also said that audiences would not have to wait as long as they did for the second in the series. According to Emmerich, the third film would depict an intergalactic journey, possibly set a year or two later since he wants to maintain the same group of people, especially the young characters.

In March 2018, LRM Online reported that, after having met producer Dean Devlin at WonderCon and asking about the status of Independence Day 3, Devlin told them "I don't know. I don't know. Currently, I personally have no plans of doing another one." One year later, Emmerich said that once The Walt Disney Company purchased Fox, he thought the chances of a third movie were over, but still had hopes that it could happen given Disney's preference for franchise films.

== See also ==
- Independence Day (book series)
