= Independence Day UK =

Audio drama written by Dirk Maggs

Independence Day UK is a one-hour BBC Radio 1 science fiction special, first broadcast on 4 August 1996.

== Production ==
The show is a spin-off of the movie Independence Day and depicts the movie's alien invasion from a British perspective. None of the original movie cast appear in the radio show. The movie's producer Dean Devlin gave Dirk Maggs permission to produce an original radio adaptation provided that he did not reveal certain details of the movie's plot, and that he did not depict the British as saving the day (this is parodied in the last scene). Maggs wrote, produced and directed the programme, with Devlin credited as "Creative Consultant". To achieve authentic aircraft sounds, Maggs' crew recorded aircraft and cockpit interior sounds at an RAF base. The programme's tagline is, "It's the Battle of Britain all over again, but this time our enemies aren't just unstoppable. They're inhuman". The drama was subsequently released on audio cassette by Polygram.

== Story ==
After a brief Orson Welles-style opening announcement, recalling Welles' notorious radio adaptation of The War of the Worlds, the programme begins with a 20th Century Fox fanfare. The first 25 minutes take the form of a live "UFO watch" broadcast hosted by Radio 1 DJ Nicky Campbell and veteran TV astronomer Patrick Moore (of The Sky at Night) aboard an RAF Sentry aircraft. Campbell and Moore and the RAF crew deliver authentic reactions to the news that a large object is approaching the Earth. The object is subsequently revealed to be an alien spacecraft.

When the alien mothership disgorges dozens of smaller ships that take up position over the world's cities, the broadcast switches to a press conference called by Prime Minister John Major and Opposition Leader Tony Blair to announce the formation of an emergency coalition government. DJ Mark Goodier reports from a rooftop on the alien ship's approach to London until it fires its weapon and the broadcast goes silent.

After a brief pause the story continues in Maggs' trademark "audio movie" style, with original music from the film and sound effects and dialogue in Dolby Surround.

Aboard the RAF Sentry, Moore and Campbell are shocked to learn that London has been destroyed. The alien ships launch fighters and the RAF Tornado pilots John Reginald and Becky Johnson engage them.

Moore draws upon his vast scientific knowledge to advise the pilots on how to combat – or at least evade – the aliens.

The fighters are then called upon to defend a BBC traffic helicopter that is attempting to carry the British royal family to safety.

The RAF succeed in bringing down one of the alien fighters, and Moore has a close (and given his age, surprisingly violent) encounter with the alien pilot. Meanwhile, Wing Commander Reginald engages the aliens in a prototype Eurofighter.

At the end of the show we learn that the Royal Family are safe and have invited Becky – a staunch republican – for tea at Balmoral. The surviving military forces of Europe and the Middle East are preparing to regroup in the Beqaa Valley. One of the RAF men comments that "when this is all over and we've defeated these monsters, the Yanks'll take the credit for it, you wait and see."

== Cast ==
- Nicky Campbell – Himself
- Patrick Moore – Himself
- Mark Goodier – Himself
- Toyah Willcox – Flight Lieutenant Becky Johnson
- Simon Treves – Wing Commander John Reginald
- Colin Baker – Group Captain Phil Johnson
- Peter Serafinowicz – Flight Lieutenant Max Brett
- Toby Longworth – Flight Lieutenant Chris Thomson
- Mark Courtney – Sentry Tactical Director
- William Hootkins – Orson Welles
- Dannii Minogue – Special alien effect

== Crew ==
- Produced, written and directed – Dirk Maggs
- Original music – Mark Russell
- Movie music – David Arnold
- An Audio Movies Limited / 20th Century Fox Production for BBC Radio 1
