= Independence Day (novel series) =

Series of novels based on the Independence Day film series

- Independence Day; Independence Day: Silent Zone; Independence Day: War in the Desert; Independence Day: Crucible; Independence Day: Resurgence
- Author: Stephen Molstad; Gregory Keyes; Alex Irvine
- Country: United States
- Language: English
- Genre: Science fiction
- Publisher: HarperEntertainment; Titan Books
- Published: 1996–2016
- Media type: Print (hardcover and paperback)

The feature film Independence Day has been the inspiration for a series of novels. The first three novels were originally published in the 1990s based on the 1996 release of the first film, and were republished in March 2016 as a single-volume edition (The Complete Independence Day Omnibus).

== Independence Day ==
The first book in the series is the novelization of the first film. Author Stephen Molstad wrote the novel to help promote the film shortly before its release. The novel goes into further detail on the characters, situations, and overall concepts not explored in the film. The novel presents the film's finale as originally scripted, with the character played by Randy Quaid stealing a missile and roping it to his cropduster biplane.

== Independence Day: Silent Zone ==
Following the film's success, a prequel novel entitled Independence Day: Silent Zone was written by Molstad in February 1998. The novel is set in the late 1960s and early 1970s, and details the early career of Dr. Brackish Okun.

== Independence Day: War in the Desert ==
Molstad wrote a third novel, Independence Day: War in the Desert in July 1999. Set in Saudi Arabia on July 3, it centers around Captain Cummins and Colonel Thompson (ranks corrected to Squadron Leader and Group Captain respectively in the Omnibus reissue which only contains the first three novels), the two Royal Air Force officers seen receiving the Morse code message in the film.

== Independence Day: Crucible ==
Independence Day: Crucible, by Greg Keyes, is the fourth book in the series, published in May 2016 bridging the events of Independence Day and its sequel.

== Independence Day: Resurgence ==
Independence Day: Resurgence, by Alex Irvine, is the novelization of the film of the same name, and the fifth book in the series. It was published on June 21, 2016, three days before the release of the second film on June 24, 2016.
