= Independence Day (1996 film) =

1996 film by Roland Emmerich

- Theatrical release poster
- Directed by: Roland Emmerich
- Written by: Dean Devlin; Roland Emmerich
- Produced by: Dean Devlin
- Starring: Will Smith; Bill Pullman; Jeff Goldblum; Mary McDonnell; Judd Hirsch; Margaret Colin; Randy Quaid; Robert Loggia; James Rebhorn; Harvey Fierstein
- Cinematography: Karl Walter Lindenlaub
- Edited by: David Brenner
- Music by: David Arnold
- Production companies: 20th Century Fox; Centropolis Entertainment
- Distributed by: 20th Century Fox
- Release dates: June 25, 1996 (Mann Plaza Theater); July 3, 1996 (United States)
- Running time: 145 minutes 154 minutes (extended cut)
- Country: United States
- Language: English
- Budget: $75 million
- Box office: $817.4 million

Independence Day is a 1996 American science fiction action film directed by Roland Emmerich, written by Emmerich and the film's producer Dean Devlin, and starring an ensemble cast that consists of Will Smith, Bill Pullman, Jeff Goldblum, Mary McDonnell, Judd Hirsch, Margaret Colin, Randy Quaid, Robert Loggia, Adam Baldwin, Vivica A. Fox, James Rebhorn, and Harvey Fierstein. The film focuses on disparate groups of people who converge in the Nevada desert in the aftermath of a worldwide attack by a powerful extraterrestrial race. With the other people of the world, they launch a counterattack on July 4—Independence Day in the United States.

While promoting Stargate in Europe, Emmerich conceived the film while answering a question about his belief in the existence of alien life. Devlin and Emmerich decided to incorporate a large-scale attack having noticed that aliens in most invasion films travel long distances in outer space only to remain hidden when reaching Earth. Shooting began on July 28, 1995, in New York City, and the film was completed on October 8, 1995.

Considered a significant turning point in the history of the Hollywood blockbuster, Independence Day was at the forefront of the large-scale disaster film and sci-fi resurgence of the mid-late 1990s. It was released worldwide on July 3, 1996, by 20th Century Fox, but began showing on July 2 (the same day the film's story begins) in original release as a result of a high level of anticipation among moviegoers. The film received positive reviews. It grossed over $817.4 million worldwide, becoming the highest-grossing film of 1996 and the second-highest-grossing film ever at the time, behind Jurassic Park (1993). The film won the Academy Award for Best Visual Effects and was nominated for the Academy Award for Best Sound.

The sequel, Independence Day: Resurgence, was released 20 years later on June 24, 2016, as part of a planned series of films.

== Plot ==
On July 2, 1996, a massive extraterrestrial mothership, entering Earth's orbit outside the Moon, deploys its flying saucers, each 15 mi (24 km) in diameter, which hover over major cities worldwide. U.S. Marine Captain Steven Hiller and his unit, the Black Knights fighter squadron stationed out of MCAS El Toro, are called back from Independence Day leave; his girlfriend, Jasmine Dubrow, decides to flee Los Angeles with her son, Dylan. Retired combat pilot Russell Casse, now an alcoholic single father and crop duster, sees this as vindication of the alien abduction he has been claiming for 10 years.

In New York City, technician David Levinson decodes a signal embedded within global satellite transmissions, realizing it is the aliens' countdown for a coordinated attack. Aided by his ex-wife, White House Communications Director Constance Spano, David and his father Julius reach the Oval Office in Washington, D.C. and alert President Thomas Whitmore.

Whitmore orders evacuations of Los Angeles, New York City, and the District of Columbia, but it is too late. Each saucer fires a death ray beam, incinerating every targeted city, killing millions. Whitmore, Spano, the Levinsons, and a few others barely escape aboard Air Force One while Jasmine and Dylan take shelter in a tunnel's inspection alcove and survive the destruction of Los Angeles.

On July 3, Earth's military retaliations against the invaders are thwarted by the alien warships' electromagnetic force fields. Each saucer launches hundreds of shielded fighters, devastating the human fighter squadrons and military bases, including Steven's. Steven lures one fighter into the Grand Canyon before ejecting from his plane, blinding the fighter using his parachute and causing it to crash in the Mojave Desert. He subdues the downed alien and flags down the convoy of refugees Russell joined with, transporting the alien to Area 51, where Whitmore's plane has landed.

U.S. Defense Secretary Albert Nimziki reveals that a government faction has been involved in a UFO conspiracy since 1947, when one of the invaders' fighters crashed near Roswell, New Mexico. Area 51 houses the refurbished ship and three alien corpses from the crash. Chief scientist Dr. Brackish Okun examines the alien captured by Steven, which awakens, telepathically invades Okun's mind, and psychically attacks Whitmore before the alien is killed by Secret Service agents and military personnel. Whitmore learns the invaders' plan from the psychic attack; similarly to locusts, they intend to annihilate Earth's inhabitants while harvesting its natural resources, as they have done to other planetary civilizations.

Whitmore reluctantly authorizes a trial nuclear attack against a saucer above a mostly evacuated Houston, but while Houston is destroyed, the saucer's force field protects it from the blast. All subsequent nuclear attacks are aborted. Jasmine and Dylan, having commandeered a highway maintenance truck and rescued several survivors, including the badly injured First Lady, Marilyn Whitmore, reunite with Steven, who takes them to Area 51, where Marilyn succumbs to her injuries after reuniting with her own family.

On July 4, inspired by Julius, David plans to infiltrate the enemy using the refurbished fighter and a computer virus he developed with Area 51 researchers. Once docked with the mothership, it will upload the virus into its operating system to disable the shields before a tactical nuclear missile destroys the enemy vessel. Steven volunteers as the mission's pilot, and the U.S. military contacts other nations using Morse code to organize a united aerial counterattack. Lacking pilots, Whitmore and General William Grey enlist volunteers with flight experience, including Russell, to fly the remaining jets. Steven marries Jasmine, with David and Constance present, during which the divorced pair reconciles before Steven and David leave on the mission.

Entering the mothership, they upload the virus. With the shields down, Whitmore's squadron engages a saucer targeting the Area 51 base. They exhaust their ammunition, and as the saucer readies to fire, Russell sacrifices himself by crashing into its primary death ray weapon, destroying the saucer. Grey orders notifications to resistance groups worldwide about the saucers' critical weakness, leading to their destruction.

Steven and David launch the missile and narrowly escape the destruction of the mothership and all the aliens in it. As humanity celebrates its victory against the aliens, Steven and David are rescued after surviving the crash and are reunited with their families.

== Cast ==
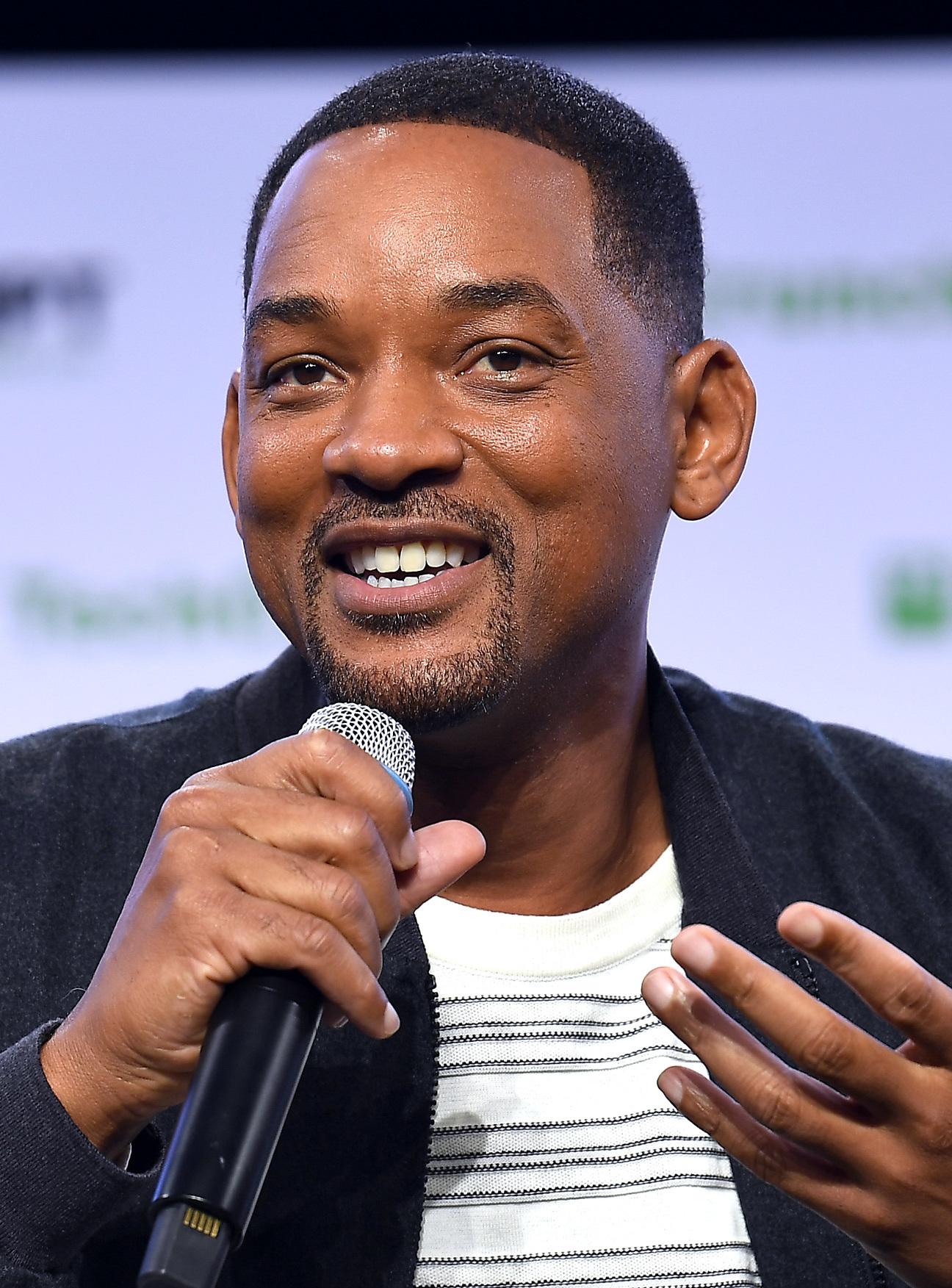
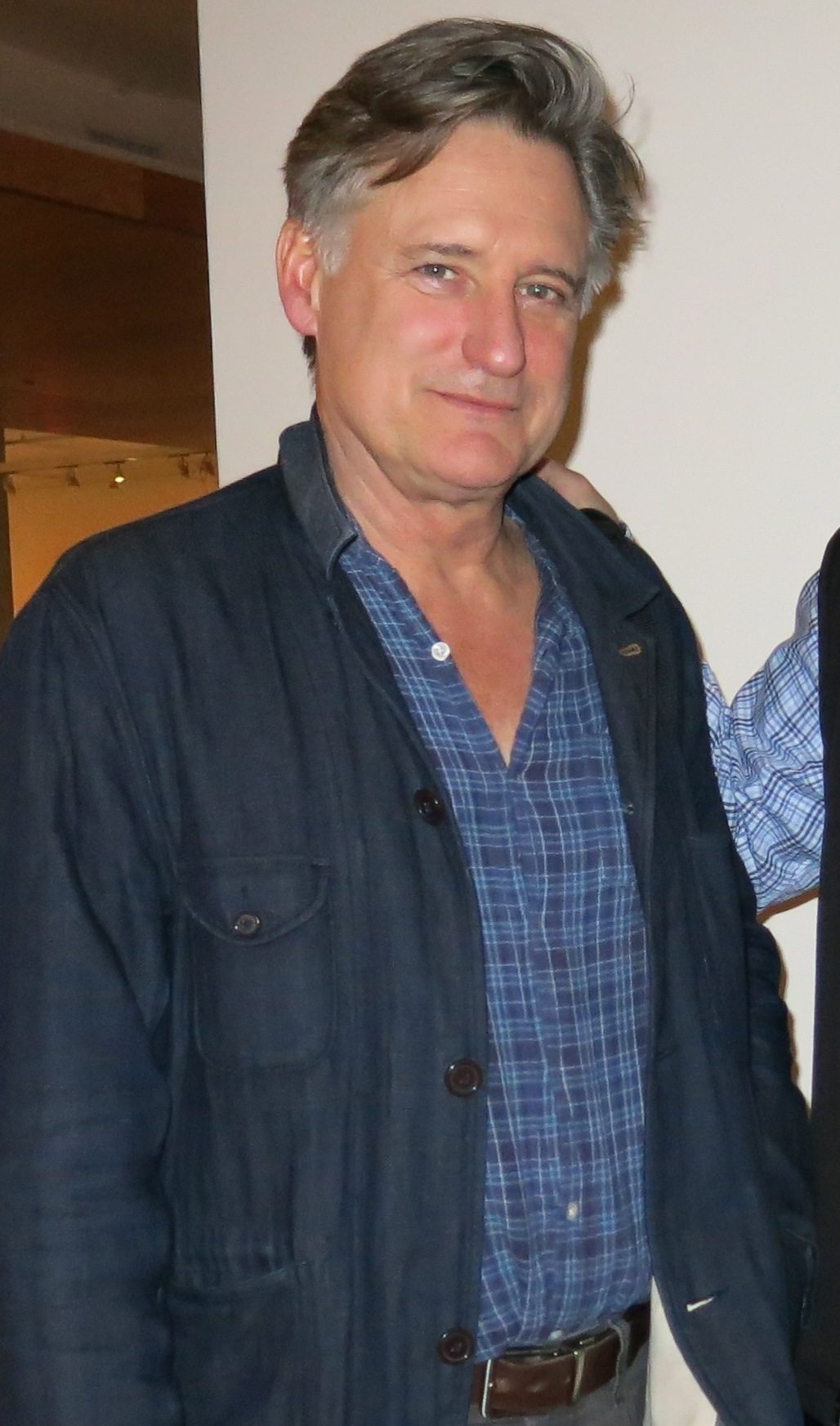
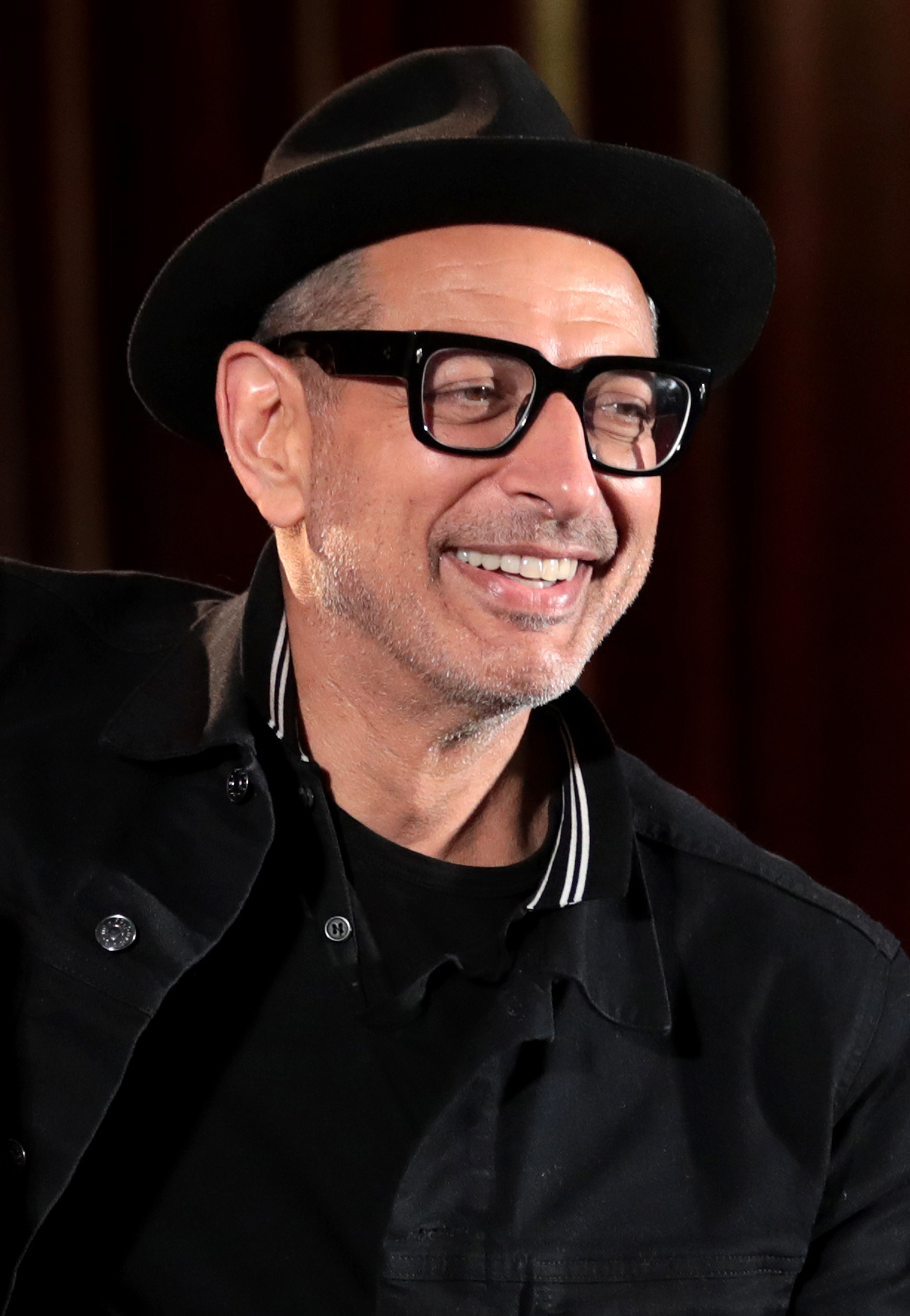
From top to bottom: Will Smith, Bill Pullman, and Jeff Goldblum.
- Will Smith as Captain Steven Hiller, a Marine F/A-18 pilot squadron leader with the Black Knight squadron at Marine Corps Air Station El Toro and aspiring astronaut. The role was originally offered to Ethan Hawke, but he turned it down, as he thought the script was terrible. According to Emmerich, Hawke was not cast because he thought he was "too young" for the role. Devlin and Emmerich had always envisioned an African-American for the role, and specifically wanted Smith after seeing his performance in Six Degrees of Separation.
- Bill Pullman as President Thomas J. Whitmore, a former fighter pilot and Gulf War veteran. Kevin Spacey was considered for the role when the character was initially written as a bad guy with a plot twist of him being a good guy when he enters the U.S. Air Force at the end. To prepare for the role, Pullman read Bob Woodward's The Commanders and watched the documentary film The War Room.
- Jeff Goldblum as David Levinson, an MIT-educated satellite engineer and technological expert.
- Mary McDonnell as First Lady Marilyn Whitmore, wife of Thomas Whitmore.
- Judd Hirsch as Julius Levinson, David Levinson's father. The character was based on one of Dean Devlin's uncles.
- Robert Loggia as General William Grey, the Commandant of the United States Marine Corps. Loggia modeled the character after World War II generals, particularly George S. Patton.
- Randy Quaid as Russell Casse, an eccentric, alcoholic former fighter pilot and Vietnam War veteran. He insists that he was abducted by the aliens while crop dusting ten years prior to the film's events, shortly after completing his military service.
- Margaret Colin as Constance Spano, Whitmore's White House Communications Director and David Levinson's ex-wife.
- Vivica A. Fox as Jasmine Dubrow, Steven Hiller's girlfriend and mother of Dylan Dubrow. Jada Pinkett Smith turned down the role in favor of The Nutty Professor.
- James Rebhorn as Albert Nimziki, the Secretary of Defense and, as former CIA Director, is a member of a governmental faction who are aware of the aliens' existence due to the ship recovered at Roswell. Not well-liked, lying, arrogant, selfish, crooked, and often at odds with idealists such as Whitmore and Grey, Nimziki embodies the stereotypical corrupt politician and his ambition is to be elected as president himself. Rebhorn described the character as being much like Oliver North. The character's eventual firing lampoons Joe Nimziki, MGM's head of advertising, who made life unpleasant for Devlin and Emmerich when studio executives forced recuts of Stargate.
- Harvey Fierstein as Marty Gilbert, David Levinson's coworker at Compact Cable Television Company who is killed in the NYC attack.
- Adam Baldwin as Major Mitchell, USAF, Area 51's commanding officer and a member of a governmental faction who are aware of the aliens' existence.
- Brent Spiner as Dr. Brackish Okun, the unkempt and highly excitable scientist in charge of research at Area 51. The character's appearance and verbal style are based upon those of visual effects supervisor Jeffrey A. Okun, with whom Emmerich had worked on Stargate.
- James Duval as Miguel Casse, the oldest son of Russell Casse.
- Bill Smitrovich as Lt. Colonel Watson, the commanding officer of the Black Knights.
- Kiersten Warren as Tiffany, friend and co-worker of Jasmine who is killed in the LA attack.
- Harry Connick Jr. as Marine Captain Jimmy Wilder, fellow fighter pilot and friend of Steven, killed in the Black Knight counterattack. Connick took over the role from Matthew Perry, who was originally cast in the role.
- Mae Whitman as Patricia Whitmore, the daughter of President Thomas J. Whitmore and First Lady Marilyn Whitmore.
- Ross Bagley as Dylan Dubrow, Jasmine Dubrow's son and Steven Hiller's stepson.
- Lisa Jakub as Alicia Casse, the daughter of Russell Casse.
- Giuseppe Andrews as Troy Casse, the son of Russell Casse.
- Special vocal effects by Frank Welker.
- Alien vocal effects by Gary A. Hecker.

== Production ==
=== Development ===
Official film logo

The idea for the film came when Roland Emmerich and Dean Devlin were in Europe promoting their film Stargate in 1994. A reporter asked Emmerich why he made a film with content like Stargate if he did not believe in aliens. Emmerich stated he was still fascinated by the idea of an alien arrival, and further explained his response by asking the reporter to imagine what it would be like to wake up one morning and to discover 15-mile-wide spaceships were hovering over the world's largest cities. Emmerich then turned to Devlin and said, "I think I have an idea for our next film."

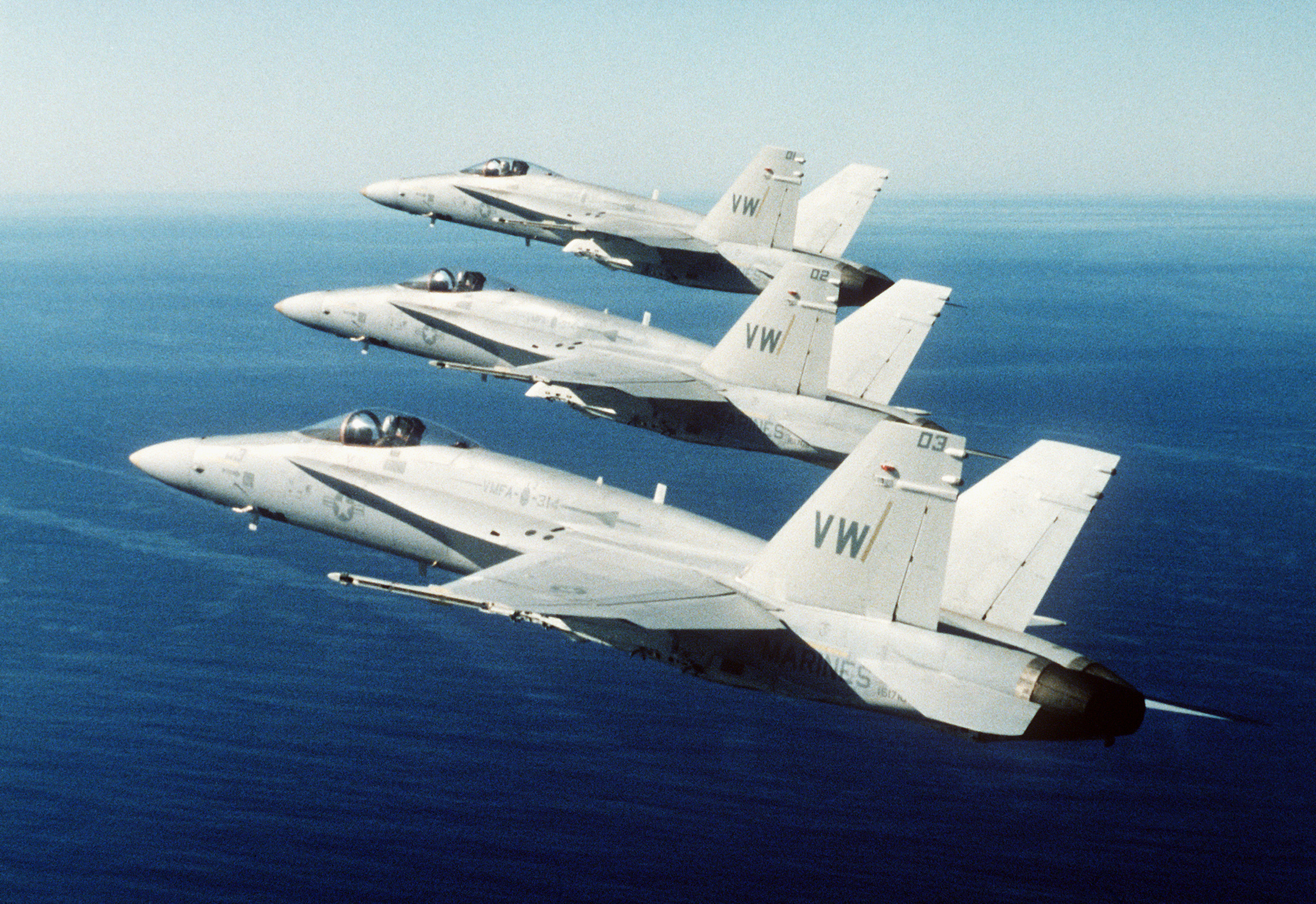
F/A-18 Hornets of VMFA-314, "Black Knights"

Emmerich and Devlin decided to expand on the idea by incorporating a large-scale attack, with Devlin saying he was bothered by the fact that "for the most part, in alien invasion movies, they come down to Earth and they're hidden in some back field …[o]r they arrive in little spores and inject themselves into the back of someone's head." Emmerich agreed by asking Devlin if arriving from across the galaxy, "would you hide on a farm or would you make a big entrance?" The two wrote the script during a month-long vacation in Mexico, and just one day after they sent it out for consideration, 20th Century Fox chairman Peter Chernin greenlit the screenplay. Universal Pictures also bid for the script. Pre-production began just three days later in February 1995. The U.S. military originally intended to provide personnel, vehicles, and costumes for the film; however, they backed out when the producers refused to remove the script's Area 51 references.

A then-record 3,000-plus special effects shots would ultimately be required for the film. The shoot used on-set and in-camera special effects more often than computer-generated effects in an effort to save money and get more authentic pyrotechnic results. Many of these shots were accomplished at Hughes Aircraft in Culver City, California, where the film's art department, motion control photography teams, pyrotechnics team, and model shop were headquartered. The production's model-making department built more than twice as many miniatures for the production than had ever been built for any film before by creating miniatures for buildings, city streets, aircraft, landmarks, and monuments. The crew also built miniatures for several of the spaceships featured in the film, including a 30-foot (9.1 m) destroyer model and a version of the mother ship spanning 12 feet (3.7 m). City streets were recreated, then tilted upright beneath a high-speed camera mounted on a scaffolding filming downwards. An explosion would be ignited below the model, and flames would rise towards the camera, engulfing the tilted model and creating the rolling "wall of destruction" look seen in the film. A model of the White House was also created, covering 10 feet (3.0 m) by 5 feet (1.5 m), and was used in forced-perspective shots before being destroyed in a similar fashion for its destruction scene. The detonation took a week to plan and required 40 explosive charges.

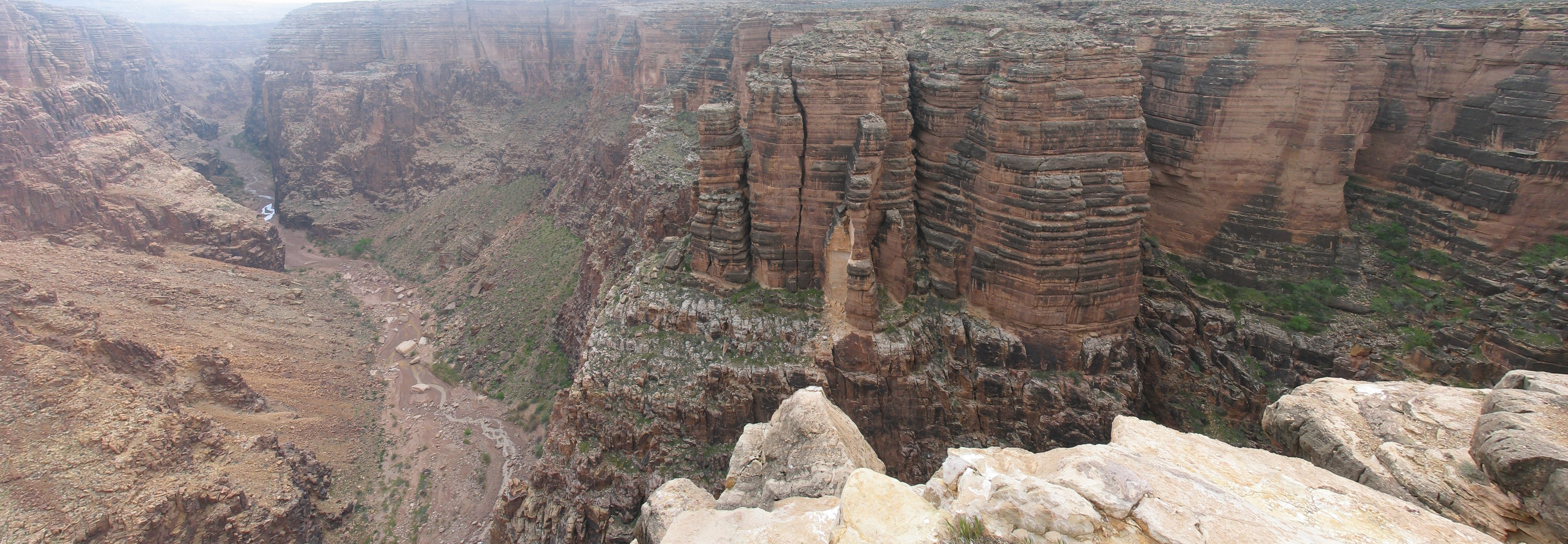
The Little Colorado River canyon; a World War II training aircraft with a camera mounted on its front navigated through the walls of the canyon and the footage was used as pilot point-of-view shots.

The film's aliens were designed by production designer Patrick Tatopoulos. The actual aliens in the film are diminutive and based on a design Tatopoulos drew when tasked by Emmerich to create an alien that was "both familiar and completely original". These creatures wear "bio-mechanical" suits that are based on another design Tatopoulos pitched to Emmerich. These suits were 8 feet (2.4 m) tall, equipped with 25 tentacles, and purposely designed to show it could not sustain a person inside, so it would not appear to be a "man in a suit".

Christopher Weaver, founder of video game publisher Bethesda Softworks, consulted with the movie's production team, Centropolis Films, and provided scientific collaboration. Dean Devlin used Weaver as the basis for the film character David Levinson.

=== Filming ===
Principal photography began on July 28, 1995, in New York City. A second unit gathered plate shots and establishing shots of Manhattan, Washington, D.C., an RV community in Flagstaff, Arizona, and the Very Large Array on the Plains of San Agustin, New Mexico. The main crew also filmed in nearby Cliffside Park, New Jersey before moving to the former Kaiser Steel mill in Fontana, California to film the post-attack Los Angeles sequences. The production then moved to Wendover, Utah, and West Wendover, Nevada, where the deserts doubled for Imperial Valley, and the Wendover Airport doubled for the El Toro and Area 51 exteriors. It was here where Pullman filmed his pre-battle speech. Immediately before filming the scene, Devlin and Pullman decided to add "Today, we celebrate our Independence Day!" to the end of the speech. At the time, the production was nicknamed "ID4" because Warner Bros. owned the rights to the title because of the identically titled 1983 film Independence Day. Devlin had hoped that if Fox executives noticed the addition in dailies, the impact of the new dialogue would help them to win the rights to the title. Pullman had stated in a 2020 interview that Fox had otherwise been aiming to use Doomsday for the film's release to match with other disaster films of the time, and Devlin and Emmerich had hoped the impact of this speech scene would help win Fox over to the Independence Day name. The right to use the title was eventually won two weeks later. Emmerich also fought for the name so the film would have to be released in July. Thus beating Mars Attacks! To theaters— which before its delay was going to be released in August.

The production team moved to the Bonneville Salt Flats to film three scenes, then returned to California to film in various places around Los Angeles, including Hughes Aircraft where sets for the cable company and Area 51 interiors were constructed at a former aircraft plant. Sets for the latter included corridors containing windows that were covered with blue material. The filmmakers originally intended to use the chroma key technique to make it appear as if an activity was happening on the other side of the glass, but the composited images were not added to the final print because production designers decided the blue panels gave the sets a "clinical look". The attacker hangar set contained an attacker mockup 65 feet (20 m) wide that took four months to build. The White House interior sets used had already been built for The American President and had previously been used for Nixon. Principal photography completed on October 8, 1995, after 72 days of filming.. In addition to reusing the White House interior sets, the production also reused sets from previous movies with the B-3 stealth bomber cockpit from Broken Arrow and the US nuclear submarine sets from Down Periscope and Crimson Tide being prime examples.

The film initially depicted Russell Casse being rejected as a volunteer for the July 4 aerial counteroffensive because of his alcoholism. He then uses a stolen missile tied to his red biplane to carry out his suicide mission. According to Dean Devlin, test audiences responded well to the scene's irony and comedic value. However, the scene was re-shot to include Russell's acceptance as a volunteer, his crash course on flying modern fighter aircraft, and him flying an F/A-18 instead of the biplane. Devlin preferred the alteration because the viewer now witnesses Russell ultimately making the decision to sacrifice his life.

=== Music ===
The Grammy Award-winning score for the film was composed by David Arnold and recorded with an orchestra of 90, a choir of 46, "and every last ounce of stereotypical Americana he could muster for the occasion". The film's producer Dean Devlin commented that "you can leave it up to a Brit to write some of the most rousing and patriotic music in the history of American cinema." The soundtrack has received two official CD releases. RCA released a 50-minute album at the time of the film's release, then in 2010, La-La Land Records and Fox Music released a limited-edition, two-disc CD set that comprised the complete score plus 12 alternate cues. The premiere of Independence Day live took place at the Royal Albert Hall in September 2016, with the film's score performed live for a screening of the film. This celebrated the twentieth anniversary of the film's release, and the event also featured a pre-film talk by David Arnold.

== Release ==
=== Theatrical ===
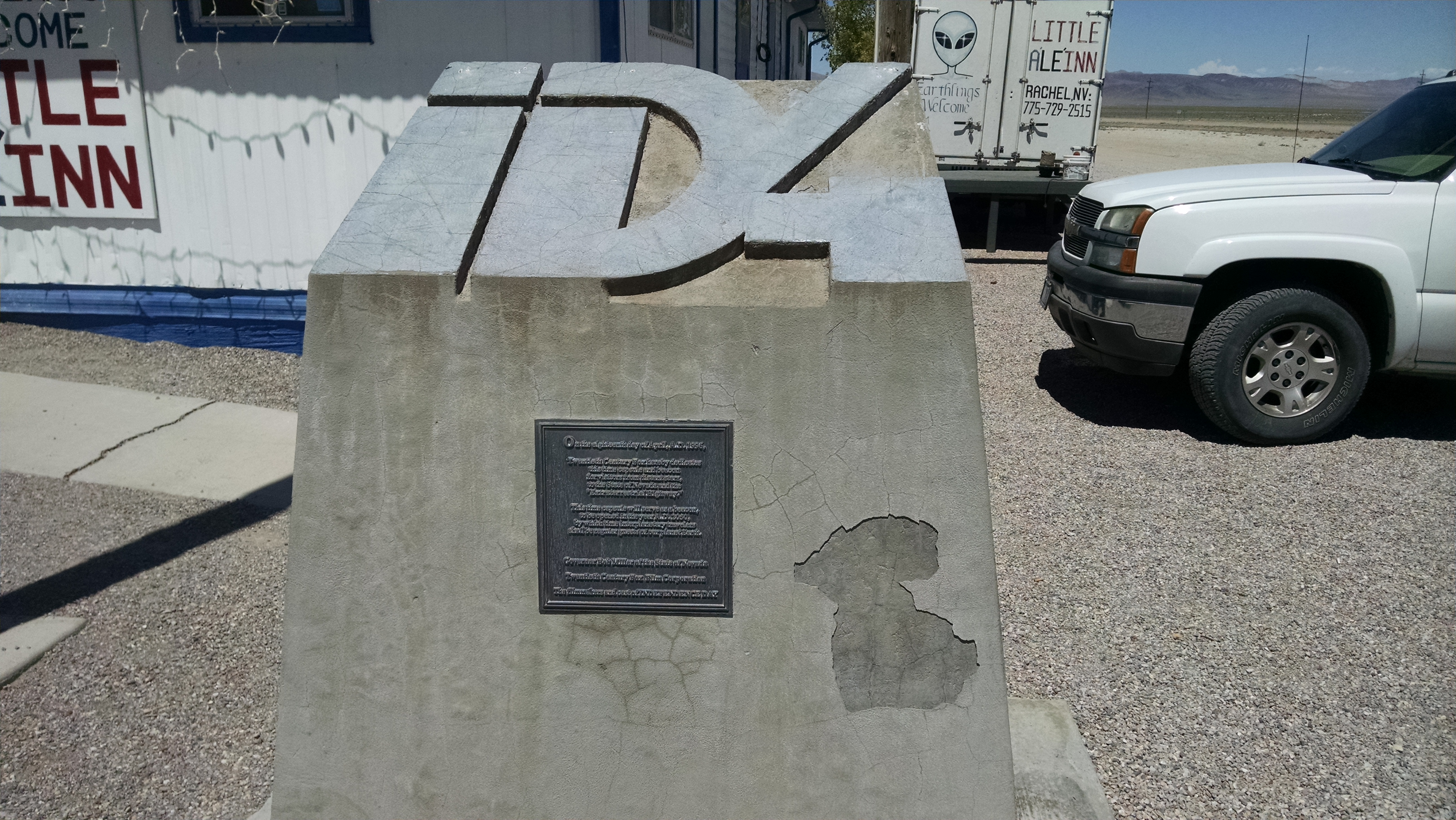
Time capsule in Rachel, Nevada.

While Independence Day was still in post-production, Fox began an expensive marketing campaign to help promote the film, beginning with the airing of a dramatic commercial during Super Bowl XXX, for which it paid $1.3 million. The film's subsequent success at the box office resulted in a trend of using Super Bowl air time to begin the advertising campaigns for potential blockbusters.

Fox's Licensing and Merchandising division also entered into co-promotional deals with Apple Inc. The co-marketing project was dubbed "The Power to Save the World" campaign, in which the company used footage of David using his PowerBook 5300 laptop in their print and television advertisements. Trendmasters entered a merchandising deal with the film's producers to create a line of tie-in toys. In exchange for product placement, Fox also entered into co-promotional deals with Molson Coors Brewing Company and Coca-Cola.

The film was marketed with several taglines, including: "We've always believed we weren't alone. On July 4, we'll wish we were", "Earth. Take a good look. It could be your last", and "Don't make plans for August". The weekend before the film's release, the Fox Network aired a half-hour special on the film, the first third of which was a spoof news report on the events that happen in the film. Roger Ebert attributed most of the film's early success to its teaser trailers and marketing campaigns, acknowledging them as "truly brilliant".

The shot of the White House's destruction was the focus of the film's marketing campaign. A fleeing helicopter was added to the shot in the final print.

The film had its official premiere held at Los Angeles' now-defunct Mann Plaza Theater on June 25, 1996. It was then screened privately at the White House for President Bill Clinton and his family before receiving a nationwide release in the United States on July 2, 1996, a day earlier than its previously scheduled opening.

=== Censorship ===
In Lebanon, certain Jewish and Israel-related content in the film was censored. One cut scene involved Judd Hirsch's character donning a kippah, and leading soldiers and White House officials in a Jewish prayer. Other removed footage showed Israeli and Arab troops working together in preparation for countering the alien invasion. The Lebanese Shi'a Islamist militant group Hezbollah called for Muslims to boycott the film, describing it as "propaganda for the so-called genius of the Jews and their concern for humanity." In response, Jewish actor Jeff Goldblum said: "I think Hezbollah has missed the point. The film is not about American Jews saving the world; it's about teamwork among people of different religions and nationalities to defeat a common enemy."

=== Home media ===
After a six-week, $30 million marketing campaign, Independence Day was released on a THX certified VHS on November 22, 1996. The film sold 22 million copies in North America, becoming the third best-selling live-action film on VHS. It was also the best-selling home video release of 1996, surpassing Toy Story. A LaserDisc release followed on January 22, 1997, which featured Dolby Digital. On July 1, 1998, an additional Special Edition LaserDisc was released, which also included audio commentary, theatrical trailers, deleted scenes, and a bundled soundtrack CD.

The film became available on DVD on June 27, 2000, and has since been re-released in several different versions of this format with varying supplemental material, including one instance where it was packaged with a lenticular cover. A special edition of the film was included on the DVD as well, which features nine minutes of additional footage not seen in the original theatrical release. A single-disc DVD version of the film was released alongside Cast Away on May 21, 2002. Independence Day became available on Blu-ray in the United Kingdom on December 24, 2007, and in North America on March 11, 2008 and in Australia on March 5, 2008. The initial single-disc releases only feature the theatrical cut and a few extras, as per the single-disc DVDs. For its 2016 twentieth anniversary, the film was re-released on two-disc Blu-ray and DVD, Ultra HD Blu-ray, and Digital HD. The 20th-anniversary editions feature both the theatrical and extended versions, all the extras of the previous 2-disc DVDs and more.

=== Television broadcast ===
Independence Day was originally scheduled to air on Fox on September 16, 2001, but was cancelled following the September 11 attacks. Fox replaced Independence Day with a repeat airing of There's Something About Mary.

=== Re-release ===
A 3D re-release was cancelled in 2013.

The film had both its twentieth anniversary and premiere at a special live-orchestral screening performance at the Royal Albert Hall on September 22, 2016. The Royal Philharmonic Orchestra, conducted by the original orchestrator Nicholas Dodd, performed the score live during the film, and the film's composer, David Arnold, was a presenter at the event.

== Reception ==
=== Box office ===
Independence Day was the highest-grossing film of 1996, surpassing both Twister and Mission: Impossible. The film had its preview screenings on July 2, 1996, grossing $11.1 million from 2,433 theaters. At that point, it had the biggest pre-opening of any film, breaking the record held by Die Hard 2 six years earlier. The next day on July 3, the film officially opened to the public with $17.4 million. During its second day of release, it earned $17.3 million, which made it the highest Thursday gross, holding this record for six years until it was taken by Star Wars: Episode II – Attack of the Clones in 2002. This was also the highest non-sequel Thursday gross, which would last until the opening of Transformers in 2007. Independence Day earned $104.3 million in its opening week, including $96.1 million during its five-day holiday opening, and $50.2 million during its opening weekend. Upon its opening, the film reached the number-one spot, beating out The Nutty Professor and Phenomenon. It stayed at the top of the box office for three consecutive weeks before being displaced by A Time to Kill. Moreover, it beat Terminator 2: Judgment Day's record for largest five-day Wednesday gross of any film, as well as the biggest July opening weekend. The combined total for the five-day Wednesday opening with ticket sales increased to $190 million, dethroning the $158.6 million record formerly held by Toy Story. In addition, the film had the second-highest opening weekend of all time, behind Batman Forever. All three figures broke records set by Jurassic Park three years earlier, whose successor, The Lost World: Jurassic Park, claimed all three records when it was released in 1997. That same year, Men in Black surpassed Independence Day for highest July opening weekend and largest three-day Fourth of July opening weekend. Despite this, the film would continue to hold the record for having the highest five-day Fourth of July Wednesday opening until Men in Black II in 2002.

Independence Day earned over $150 million in 12 days, becoming the quickest film to do so. In 21 days, it became the fastest film to approach the $200 million mark. The film would hold this record for three years until it was surpassed by Star Wars: Episode I – The Phantom Menace in 1999. By the end of July 1996, Independence Day had lost 38% of its audience, but it was able to top Ghostbusters (1984), Aladdin (1992), Mrs. Doubtfire (1993), Total Recall, and Ghost (both 1990), becoming the fourteenth-highest domestic grossing film of all time. It reached $230 million within the first month of release, and on August 9, crossed the $250 million mark. Halfway through the month, it became the eighth-highest domestic grosser, beating Jaws.

Independence Day grossed $306,169,268 in the United States and Canada and $511,231,623 in other territories during its theatrical run. The combined worldwide total of $817,400,891 surpassed The Lion King, second only to the worldwide earnings of Jurassic Park as the highest of all time. It was the highest-grossing original film of all time for seven years until it was beaten by Finding Nemo in 2003. For over 20 years, the film would hold the record for being Will Smith's highest-grossing film until 2019 when it was surpassed by the live-action remake of Aladdin. The domestic record was beaten by Suicide Squad three years earlier in 2016. In the UK, the film grossed £7,005,905 in its opening weekend (including £939,022 from previews), surpassing Jurassic Park's record of £4.9 million. The film grossed a record $10.5 million in its opening weekend in Germany and also beat the opening record in France. Box Office Mojo estimates that the film sold over 69.26 million tickets in the US and Canada. Hoping to capitalize on the film's success, several studios released large-scale disaster films, and the already rising interest in science fiction-related media was further increased by the film's popularity.

A month after the film's release, jewelry designers and marketing consultants reported an increased interest in dolphin-themed jewelry, as the character Jasmine (Vivica A. Fox) wears dolphin earrings, and is presented with a wedding ring featuring a gold dolphin.

=== Critical response ===
Review aggregator Rotten Tomatoes reports that 77% of 154 surveyed critics gave Independence Day a positive review; the average rating is 7.2/10. The site's critical consensus reads, "Harkening back to the spirit of classic sci-fi and souping it up with modern pyrotechnic bravura, Independence Day is a proudly goofy invasion epic whose lack of pretension earns it an enthusiastic salute." On Metacritic, the film has a score of 59 out of 100 based on 19 critics, indicating "mixed or average" reviews. Audiences polled by CinemaScore gave the film an average grade of "A" on an A+ to F scale.

Critics wrote that the film has "cardboard" and "stereotypical" characters, and weak dialogue. However, the shot of the White House's destruction was declared a milestone in visual effects and one of the most memorable scenes of the 1990s. In a 2010 poll, readers of Entertainment Weekly rated it the second-greatest summer film of the previous 20 years, ranking only behind Jurassic Park.

Mick LaSalle of the San Francisco Chronicle gave the film his highest rating, declaring it the "apotheosis" of comic book space adventure movies. Lisa Schwarzbaum of Entertainment Weekly gave it a B+ for living up to its massive hype, adding "charm is the foremost of this epic's contemporary characteristics. The script is witty, knowing, cool." Eight years later, Entertainment Weekly rated the film as one of the best disaster films of all time. Kenneth Turan of the Los Angeles Times felt that the film did an "excellent job conveying the boggling immensity of [the] extraterrestrial vehicles […] and panic in the streets" and the scenes of the alien attack were "disturbing, unsettling and completely convincing".

The film's nationalistic overtones were widely criticized by reviewers outside the U.S. Movie Review UK described the film as "a mish-mash of elements from a wide variety of alien invasion movies and gung-ho American jingoism." The speech during which Whitmore states that victory in the coming war would see the entire world henceforth describe July 4 as its Independence Day, was described in a BBC review as "the most jaw-droppingly pompous soliloquy ever delivered in a mainstream Hollywood movie." In 2003, readers of Empire voted that scene as the "Cheesiest Movie Moment of All-Time". Empire critic Kim Newman had given the film a five-star rating in the magazine's original review.

Several critics were disappointed by the special effects. Newsweek's David Ansen claimed they were no better than those seen nineteen years earlier in Star Wars. Todd McCarthy of Variety felt the production's budget-conscious approach resulted in "cheesy" shots, lacking the quality of effects in films by James Cameron and Steven Spielberg. Roger Ebert noted a lack of imagination in the spaceship and creature designs. Gene Siskel expressed the same sentiments in his At the Movies review.

American Film Institute lists

- AFI's 100 Years...100 Thrills – Nominated
- AFI's 10 Top 10 – Nominated Science Fiction Film

=== Accolades ===
Award	Subject	Nominee	Result
CAS Awards	Best Sound	Chris Carpenter, Bob Beemer, Bill W. Benton and Jeff Wexler	Nominated
Academy Awards	Best Sound	Chris Carpenter, Bob Beemer, Bill W. Benton and Jeff Wexler	Nominated
Academy Awards	Best Visual Effects	Volker Engel, Douglas Smith, Clay Pinney and Joe Viskocil	Won
Czech Lion Awards	The most successful movie in Cinemas.	Roland Emmerich	Won
Saturn Awards	Best Special Effects	Volker Engel, Douglas Smith, Clay Pinney and Joe Viskocil	Won
Saturn Awards	Best Science Fiction Film	Dean Devlin	Won
Saturn Awards	Best Director	Roland Emmerich	Won
Saturn Awards	Best Writer	Roland Emmerich and Dean Devlin	Nominated
Saturn Awards	Best Costumes	Joseph A. Porro	Nominated
Saturn Awards	Best Supporting Actor	Brent Spiner	Nominated
Saturn Awards	Best Supporting Actress	Vivica A. Fox	Nominated
Saturn Awards	Best Young Actor	James Duval	Nominated
Saturn Awards	Best Music	David Arnold	Nominated
Saturn Awards	Best Actor	Jeff Goldblum	Nominated
Saturn Awards	Best Actor	Will Smith	Nominated
Kids' Choice Awards	Favorite Movie Actor	Will Smith	Nominated
Kids' Choice Awards	Favorite Movie	—N/a	Won
Hugo Awards	Best Dramatic Presentation	—N/a	Nominated
Young Artist Awards	Best Young Actor – Age 10 or Under	Ross Bagley	Nominated
People's Choice Awards	Favorite Dramatic Motion Picture	—N/a	Won
MTV Movie Awards	Best Action Sequence	Aliens blow up cities	Nominated
MTV Movie Awards	Best Movie	—N/a	Nominated
MTV Movie Awards	Best Male Performance	Will Smith	Nominated
MTV Movie Awards	Best Breakthrough Performance	Vivica A. Fox	Nominated
MTV Movie Awards	Best Kiss	Will Smith and Vivica A. Fox	Won
Grammy Awards	Best Instrumental Composition Written for a Motion Picture or for Television	David Arnold	Won
Satellite Awards	Outstanding Visual Effects	Volker Engel, Douglas Smith, Clay Pinney and Joe Viskocil	Won
Satellite Awards	Outstanding Film Editing	David Brenner	Won
Mainichi Film Awards	Best Foreign Language Film	—N/a	Won
Japanese Academy Awards	Best Foreign Language Film	—N/a	Nominated
Amanda Award	Best Foreign Language Film	—N/a	Nominated
Blockbuster Entertainment Awards	Favorite Actor – Sci-Fi	Will Smith	Won
Universe Reader's Choice Awards	Best Actor	Will Smith	Won
Universe Reader's Choice Awards	Best Supporting Actress	Vivica A. Fox	Won
Universe Reader's Choice Awards	Best Science Fiction Film	—N/a	Won
Universe Reader's Choice Awards	Best Special Effects	Volker Engel, Douglas Smith, Clay Pinney and Joe Viskocil	Won
Universe Reader's Choice Awards	Best Director	Roland Emmerich	Won
Universe Reader's Choice Awards	Best Score	David Arnold	Won
Universe Reader's Choice Awards	Best Cinematography	Karl Walter Lindenlaub	Won
Universe Reader's Choice Awards	Best Writing	Roland Emmerich and Dean Devlin	Won
Golden Raspberry Awards	Worst Written Film Grossing Over $100 Million	Roland Emmerich and Dean Devlin	Nominated
Stinkers Bad Movie Awards	Worst Screenplay for a Film Grossing Over $100 Million	Roland Emmerich and Dean Devlin	Nominated
Stinkers Bad Movie Awards	Worst Picture	Roland Emmerich and Dean Devlin	Nominated
Online Film & Television Association Awards	Best Sci-Fi/Fantasy Horror Picture	Dean Devlin	Nominated
Online Film & Television Association Awards	Best Sci-Fi/Fantasy Horror Actor	Will Smith	Nominated
Online Film & Television Association Awards	Best Film Editing	David Brenner	Nominated
Online Film & Television Association Awards	Best Sound	Chris Carpenter; Bill W. Benton; Bob Beemer; Jeff Wexler	Nominated
Online Film & Television Association Awards	Best Sound Effects	Sandy Gendler & Val Kuklowsky	Nominated
Online Film & Television Association Awards	Best Visual Effects	Volker Engel; Douglas Smith; Clay Pinney; Joe Viskocil	Nominated

=== Legacy ===
Disaster elements portrayed in Twister and Independence Day (both in 1996) represented a significant turning point for Hollywood blockbuster films. With advancements in CGI special effects, events depicting mass destruction became commonplace in films that soon followed, such as Dante's Peak and Volcano (both in 1997), as well as Deep Impact and Armageddon (both in 1998). The trend resumed from the mid-2000s to 2010s, evident in three of Emmerich's films titled The Day After Tomorrow (2004), 2012 (2009), and White House Down (2013), as well as other blockbusters like Transformers (2007) and The Avengers (2012).

== In other media ==
=== Books ===
Author Stephen Molstad wrote a tie-in novel to help promote the film shortly before its release. The novel goes into further detail on the characters, situations, and overall concepts not explored in the film. The novel presents the film's finale as originally scripted, with the character played by Randy Quaid stealing a missile and roping it to his cropduster biplane.

Following the film's success, a prequel novel entitled Independence Day: Silent Zone was written by Molstad in February 1998. The novel is set in the late 1960s and early 1970s, and details the early career of Dr. Brackish Okun.

Molstad wrote a third novel, Independence Day: War in the Desert in July 1999. Set in Saudi Arabia on July 3, it centers around the two Royal Air Force officers seen receiving the Morse code message in the film.

=== Comic Books ===
A Marvel comic book was also published, and released ahead of the movie premiere. It consisted of three issues (numbered #0, 1 and 2).

The #0 issue is a prequel story, and like the prequel novel released in 1998, it shows part of Dr Brackish Okun's early career.

=== Radio ===
On August 4, 1996, BBC Radio 1 broadcast the one-hour play Independence Day UK, written, produced, and directed by Dirk Maggs, a spin-off depicting the alien invasion from a British perspective. None of the original cast was present. Dean Devlin gave Maggs permission to produce an original version, on the condition that he did not reveal certain details of the movie's plot, and that the British were not depicted as saving the day. Independence Day UK was set up to be similar to the 1938 radio broadcast of The War of the Worlds—the first 20 minutes were live.

=== Multimedia ===
In 1996, a "behind-the-scenes" multimedia CD-ROM titled Inside Independence Day was released for Microsoft Windows and Macintosh; it includes storyboards for the film, sketches, movie clips, and a preview of the Independence Day video game.

=== Video games ===
An Independence Day video game was released in February 1997 for the PlayStation, Sega Saturn, and PC, each version receiving mostly tepid reviews. The multi-view shooter game contains various missions to perform, with the ultimate goal of destroying the aliens' primary weapon. A pinball machine themed to the film was released by Sega in June 1996. Plus, a wireless mobile version was released in 2005.

A video game titled ID4 Online (or Independence Day Online) was released by Mythic Entertainment.

=== Toys ===
Trendmasters released a toy line for the film in 1996. Each action figure, vehicle or playset came with a 3 1/2 inch floppy disk that contained an interactive computer game.

== Franchise ==
In June 2011, Devlin confirmed that he and Emmerich had written a treatment for two sequels to form a trilogy; both expressed the desire for Will Smith to return. In October 2011, however, discussions over Smith returning were halted, due to Fox's refusal to provide the $50 million salary demanded by Smith for the two sequels. Emmerich, however, made assurances that the films would be shot back-to-back, regardless of Smith's involvement.

In March 2013, Emmerich stated that the titles of the new films would be ID: Forever – Part I and ID: Forever – Part II. In November 2014, the sequel was given the green light by 20th Century Fox, with a release date of June 24, 2016. This would be a stand-alone sequel, that would not split into two parts as originally planned, with filming beginning in May 2015 and casting being done after the studio locked down Emmerich as the director of the film. In December 2014, Devlin confirmed that Emmerich would indeed be directing the sequel. On June 22, 2015, Emmerich announced the official title, Independence Day: Resurgence.

With respect to Smith's decision not to return to film a sequel, Emmerich told Screen Crush that: "In the very beginning, I wanted to work with him and he was excited to be in it but then after a while he was tired of sequels, and he did another science fiction film, which was his father-son story After Earth, so he opted out."

Independence Day: Resurgence was released on June 24, 2016. The sequel, unlike the original, was both a critical and commercial failure, making further sequels unlikely. Furthermore, in March 2018, LRM Online reported that, after having met producer Dean Devlin at WonderCon and asking about the status of Independence Day 3, Devlin told them "I don't know. I don't know. Currently, I personally have no plans of doing another one." One year later, Emmerich stated that once The Walt Disney Company purchased Fox, he thought the chances of a third movie were over, but still had hopes that the project could happen given Disney's preference for franchise films.

== See also ==
- Independence Day (book series)
- List of films featuring extraterrestrials
