= Anonymous (soundtrack) =

Anonymous (Original Motion Picture Soundtrack)

Film score by Thomas Wander and Harald Kloser
- Released: October 25, 2011
- Genre: Film score
- Length: 40:06
- Label: Madison Gate
- Producers: Thomas Wander; Harald Kloser

Thomas Wander and Harald Kloser chronology
2012 (2009)	Anonymous (Original Motion Picture Soundtrack) (2011)	White House Down (2013)

Anonymous (Original Motion Picture Soundtrack) is the soundtrack to the 2011 film Anonymous, directed by Roland Emmerich and featured musical score composed by Thomas Wander and Harald Kloser. The film score was released through Madison Gate Records on October 25, 2011.

== Development ==
In October 2010, it was reported that Thomas Wander and Harald Kloser would score music for Anonymous; the duo would reportedly collaborate with Emmerich for the fourth time after The Day After Tomorrow (2004), 10,000 BC (2008) and 2012 (2009). As their previous collaborations involved on scoring action, science-fiction and disaster films, scoring Anonymous, which was a period drama was a "fascinating challenge" to them. Wander would write the score first, while Kloser would provide feedback to the specific score and contribute various themes and motifs. He would then provide complete musical pieces before the film's post-production.

The finished score was recorded in Berlin and performed by the Berlin Film Orchestra; they used several unusual instruments such as the hurdy gurdy and a lithophone, and few stones that were found in Cumbria over 200 years ago were used in the musical score as "it gave this very interesting color and flavor to the music".

== Release ==
Madison Gate Records released the 19-track score album on October 25, 2011.

== Critical reception ==
Thomas Glorieux of Maintitles.net described it as a "surprisingly soft score for a Roland Emmerich movie". Filmtracks, however wrote, "Outside of these fleeting moments, however, Kloser and Wanker once again fail to yield convincingly emotional appeal in their effectively functional but sadly underachieving tone." Robert Koehler of Variety called it as "an ordinary score by Thomas Wander and Harald Kloser isn't up to the same standard." A. O. Scott of The New York Times found it to be "underwhelming".

The score was shortlisted as one among the 97 contenders for Academy Award for Best Original Score at the 84th Academy Awards.

== Track listing ==
Anonymous (Original Motion Picture Soundtrack) track listing
No.	Title	Length
1.	"She Had Your Child"	2:09
2.	"The Succession"	2:15
3.	"Edward's Breakdown"	1:41
4.	"Hamlet in the Rain"	1:24
5.	"Sould of the Age"	3:10
6.	"You Stay in England"	1:08
7.	"God Save the Queen"	2:59
8.	"Play After Play"	2:35
9.	"The Voices"	1:22
10.	"Arrest Them"	1:54
11.	"Edward's Theme"	1:33
12.	"Words Will Prevail"	1:34
13.	"Bedding the Queen"	1:17
14.	"Bursting In"	1:23
15.	"William Shake-Speare"	2:56
16.	"It's a Trap"	2:36
17.	"Day of the Play"	5:22
18.	"Will's Trumph"	1:29
19.	"The Other One"	1:19
Total length:		40:06
