= 2012 (soundtrack) =

2012 (Original Motion Picture Soundtrack)

Soundtrack album by Harald Kloser and Thomas Wander
- Released: November 10, 2009
- Recorded: 2009
- Studios: Sony Scoring Stage, Sony Pictures Studios, Culver City, California; Lightning Sound Studios, Hidden Hills, California; Capitol Studios, Hollywood, Los Angeles
- Genres: Pop rock; film score
- Length: 57:47
- Label: RCA
- Producers: Harald Kloser; Thomas Wander

Harald Kloser and Thomas Wander chronology
Giant (2009)	2012 (2009)	Anonymous (2011)

Singles from 2012 (Original Motion Picture Soundtrack)
- 1. "Time for Miracles" Released: October 20, 2009

2012 (Original Motion Picture Soundtrack) is the film score to the 2009 epic apocalyptic disaster film 2012 directed by Roland Emmerich, starring John Cusack, Chiwetel Ejiofor, Amanda Peet, Oliver Platt, Thandiwe Newton, Danny Glover and Woody Harrelson. The film score is composed by Harald Kloser and Thomas Wander and released through RCA Records on November 10, 2009. Adam Lambert's original song "Time for Miracles" preceded as the single on October 20, 2009.

== Background ==
2012's original score is composed by the screenwriter-producer Harald Kloser in collaboration with Thomas Wander, who had previously collaborated with Emmerich in The Day After Tomorrow (2004) and 10,000 BC (2008). Adam Lambert, a runner-up in the eighth season of American Idol, contributed a song titled "Time for Miracles", which was written by Alain Johannes and Natasha Shneider. It was released as a single on October 20, 2009. The soundtrack which released on November 10, 2009, featured two more songs—"Fades Like a Photograph" by Filter and "It Ain't the End of the World" by George Segal and Blu Mankuma—alongside Kloser and Wander's score.

== Reception ==
Thomas Glorieux of Maintitles wrote "When you hear 2012, you hear music that will work without a doubt in a movie, and it will be sufficient for the common populas. But we are not common, we are looking for something uncommon, something inspirational. We can't help but wonder what a Jerry Goldsmith, a Basil Poledouris or even a David Arnold could have given us, because anything from them would have been better in the end. While Roland Emmerich was giving it all his best in production design and special effects, the last thing we wanted was average effective music. Alas ... it is what we got!"

James Southall of Movie Wave wrote "while 2012 is more slickly orchestrated than a Zimmer score, it has absolutely no soul [...] If David Arnold were still alive, he'd be turning in his grave. I've heard worse music and have probably given it higher ratings, but rarely have I heard anything so completely devoid of heart and feeling." Jonathan Broxton of Movie Music UK wrote "The problem with 2012 is the sheer lack of imagination; it's just so predictable and so characterless as to be stupefying. It wants to be heroic, wants to be stirring, wants to be epic, but ends up sounding like a bad parody of itself."

Christian Clemmensen of Filmtracks wrote "Listeners already familiar with The Day After Tomorrow will hear a reprise of significant chunks of that score's non-descript moments as well, though the increase in the magnificence factor in 2012, summarized by "The End is Only the Beginning," gives the latter score the upper hand in terms of its album presentation. Overall, this music is still dull given the genre's expectations and potential. It makes rather mediocre disaster scores from great composers (like Alan Silvestri's Volcano) seem like triumphs of character. At least it's superior Tyler Bates' take on the same idea." Jon O'Brien of AllMusic wrote "Alongside the 21 instrumental pieces, there are also three vocal numbers from American Idol runner-up Adam Lambert ("Time for Miracles"), alt-rock outfit Filter ("Fades Like a Photograph"), and George Segal and Blu Mankuma ("It Ain't the End of the World")." Todd McCarthy of Variety and Manohla Dargis of The New York Times called the score as "fair" and "predictable".

== Track listing ==
No.	Title	Artist(s)	Length
1.	"Time for Miracles"	Adam Lambert	4:43
2.	"Constellation"		1:30
3.	"Wisconsin"		1:14
4.	"U.S. Army"		2:20
5.	"Ready To Rumble"		1:42
6.	"Spirit of Santa Monica"		1:21
7.	"It Ain't The End Of The World"	George Segal; Blu Mankma	2:52
8.	"Great Kid"		2:17
9.	"Finding Charlie"		1:45
10.	"Run Daddy Run"		1:14
11.	"Stepping Into The Darkness"		1:35
12.	"Leaving Las Vegas"		1:44
13.	"Ashes In D.C"		4:19
14.	"We Are Talking The Bentley"		3:43
15.	"Nampan Plateau"		2:51
16.	"Saving Caesar"		2:09
17.	"Adrian's Speech"		1:41
18.	"Open The Gates!"		2:16
19.	"The Impact"		1:49
20.	"Suicide Mission"		2:06
21.	"2012 The End Of The World"		1:24
22.	"Collision With Mount Everest"		1:09
23.	"The End Is Only The Beginning"		5:44
24.	"Fades Like A Photograph"	Filter	4:19
Total length:			57:47

== Personnel ==
Credits adapted from liner notes:

- Music composer and producer – Harald Kloser, Thomas Wander
- Programming – Tommy Schobel
- Recording and mixing – Shawn Murphy
- Mastering – Louie Teran
- Supervising score editor – Fernand Bos
- Additional score editor – Adrian Van Velsen, Ronald Webb
- Sample development – Lothar Bellutta
- Score production coordinator – Haley M. Wilson
- Copyist – Ross DeRoche Music
- Executive producer – Roland Emmerich
- Executive in charge of music – Lia Vollack
- Art direction and design – Erwin Gorostiza

Orchestra

- Orchestra – The Hollywood Studio Symphony
- Orchestra conductor – James Brett
- Orchestrators – James Brett, Marcus Trumpp, Robert Elhai
- Orchestra contractor – Peter Rotter
- Concertmaster – Roger Wilkie

Instruments

- Bass – David Parmeter, Drew Dembowski, Edward Meares, Michael Valerio, Neil Stubenhaus, Nicolas Philippon, Oscar Hidalgo, Susan Ranney, Ann Atkinson, Bruce Morgenthaler, Chris Kollgaard, Dave Stone, Don Ferrone, Frances Liu, Neil Garber, Steve Dress
- Bassoon – Katherine Oliver, Kenneth Munday, Michael O'Donovan, Allen Savedoff, Judy Farmer, Rose Corrigan
- Cello – Armen Ksajikian, David Speltz, Dennis Karmazyn, Erika Duke-Kirkpatrick, George Kim Scholes, Jennifer Lee Kuhn, John Walz, Stan Sharp, Timothy Landauer, Victor Lawrence, Steve Erdody, Andrew Shulman, Cecilia Tsan, Christina Soule, Dane Little, Paul Cohen, Paula Hochhalter, Rudy Stein, Steve Richards, Suzie Katayama, Trevor Handy
- Clarinet – Ralph Williams, Steven Roberts, Stuart Clark, Donald Foster, Joshua Ranz
- Electric cello – Martin Tillman
- Erhu – Karen Han
- Ethnic woodwinds – Chris Bleth
- Flute – David Shostac, Heather Clark, Jennifer Olson, Lisa Edelstein, Geraldine Rotella, James Walker
- Guitar – Michael Landau, Michael Thompson
- Harp – Jo Ann Turovsky
- Horn – Brian O'Connor, David Duke, Eric Overholt, Ethan Bearman, Katharine Dennis, James Thatcher, Dan Kelley*, Jenny Kim, Mark Adams, Paul Klintworth, Richard Todd, Steve Becknell
- Oboe – Chris Bleth, Phillip Ayling, Leslie Reed, Thomas Boyd, Barbara Northcutt, Jon Davis
- Percussion – Donald Williams, Michael Englander, Steven Schaeffer, Wade Culbreath, Alan Estes, Gregory Goodall, Peter Limonick
- Piano – Randy Kerber, Bryan Pezzone
- Solo vocals – Carmel Echols, Joel Virgel
- Trombone – Alexander Iles, William Reichenbach, Phillip Teele, Steven Holtman, William Booth, Andy Malloy, George Thatcher
- Trumpet – Barry Perkins, David Washburn, Jon Lewis, Timothy Morrison, Rob Frear, Wayne Bergeron
- Tuba – Doug Tornquist, Gary Hickman, Ross DeRoche
- Viola – Andrew Duckles, Cassandra Richburg, Darrin McCann, David Walther, Jennie Hansen, Luke Maurer, Marlow Fisher, Michael Nowak, Samuel Formicola, Victoria Miskolczy, Brian Dembow, Aaron Oltman, Alma Fernandez, Denyse Buffum, Janet Lakatos, Karie Prescott, Kazi Pitelka, Keith Greene, Maria Newman, Matt Funes, Rob Brophy, Shawn Mann, Thomas Diener
- Violin – Alyssa Park, Amy Hershberger, Anatoly Rosinsky, Bruce Dukov, Caroline Campbell, Darius Campo, Dimitrie Leivici, Endre Granat, Eun-Mee Ahn, Helen Nightengale, Jacqueline Brand, Jay Rosen, Joel Pargman, Karen Han, Kenneth Yerke, Lorenz Gamma, Miwako Watanabe, Natalie Leggett, Neil Samples, Nina Evtuhov, Phillip Levy, Radu Pieptea, Rafael Rishik, Richard Altenback, Roberto Cani, Sarah Thornblade, Searmi Park, Serena McKinney, Shalini Vijayan, Tamara Hatwan, Julie Ann Gigante, Aimee Kreston, Alan Grunfeld, Ana Landauer, Armen Anassian, Belinda Broughton, Cameron Patrick, Charlie Bisharat, Clayton Haslop, Eric Hosler, Gerardo Hilera, Grace Oh, Henry Gronnier, Irina Voloshina, Ishani Bhoola, Jeanne Skrocki, Josefina Vergara, Julian Hallmark, Julie Rogers, Kevin Connolly, Liane Mautner, Lisa Sutton, Marc Sazer, Marina Manukian, Mario DeLeon, Mark Robertson, Michele Richards, Phil Vaiman, Sara Parkins, Sid Page, Songa Lee, Sungil Lee, Tereza Stanislav

Choir

- Choir contractor – Jasper Randall
- Alto – Aleta Braxton, Aber Erwin, Amy Fogerson, Angie Jaree, Cindy Bourquin, Donna Medine, Edie Lehmann Boddicker, Jennifer Barnes, Kimberly Switzer, Leanna Brand, Michele Hemmings, Nike St. Clair
- Bass – Aaron Roethe, Abdiel Gonzalez, Bob Joyce, Eric Bradley, Jim Campbell, Paul Bent, Reid Bruton, Scott Graff, Nico Abondolo
- Soprano – Ayana Haviv, Darlene Koldenhoven, Diane Freiman Reynolds, Elin Carlson, Jennifer Graham, Karen Hogle Brown, Karen Whipple Schnurr, Lesley Leighton, Lori Moran, Marie Hodgson, Monique Donnelly, Tyler Azelton
- Tenor – Agostino Castagnola, Chris Mann, Christopher Gambol, Gerald White, Jasper Randall, Jonathan Mack, Michael Lichtenauer, Steve Amerson

== Accolades ==
Awards	Category	Recipient(s) and nominee(s)	Result	Ref.
ASCAP Film and Television Music Awards	Top Box Office Films	Harald Kloser and Thomas Wander	Won	
BMI Film & TV Awards	BMI Film Music Awards	Harald Kloser and Thomas Wander	Nominated	
Motion Picture Sound Editors	Best Sound Editing – Music in a Feature Film	Fernand Bos (supervising music editor); Ronald J. Webb, Adrian Van Velsen (music editors)	Nominated	
