= After the Truth =

1999 German film

- Directed by: Roland Suso Richter
- Written by: Johannes W. Betz; Christopher Riley; Kathleen Riley
- Produced by: Martin Heldmann; Werner Koenig; Edward R. Pressman
- Starring: Kai Wiesinger; Götz George; Karoline Eichhorn
- Music by: Harald Kloser; Thomas Wander
- Distributed by: Edward R. Pressman Film Corporation
- Release dates: September 23, 1999 (Germany); October 28, 2001 (United States)
- Running time: 125 minutes
- Country: Germany
- Language: German

After the Truth (German: Nichts als die Wahrheit) is a 1999 German film depicting the fictional trial of Dr. Josef Mengele, known as the "death angel of Auschwitz". The film, starring Götz George as Mengele and Kai Wiesinger as his lawyer, is based on the original English-language screenplay by American writers Christopher and Kathleen Riley. The German title translates to "Nothing but the truth".

== Synopsis ==
The infamous Nazi doctor Josef Mengele, who performed unethical medical experiments and is considered to be personally responsible for the selection of mass groups of detainees to be murdered in the gas chambers at the Auschwitz concentration camp, comes back from his hideout in Argentina as an 87-year-old man who is in his last days. Back in Germany, he must face trial for his crimes. Peter Rohm, a young solicitor and expert on Mengele, has to defend him. But Rohm feels unable to do so; when he decides to take on the case he endangers not only the relationship to his wife but also their very lives.

While the entire world looks on the Mengele trial, Rohm learns that the history of his own family has a closer connection with the Nazis' genocide than he ever had suspected.

== Production ==
Götz George was also a co-producer of the film, which had problems finding financial support. The actor invested heavily to see the film completed.

== Cast ==
- Kai Wiesinger as Peter Rohm
- Götz George as Josef Mengele
- Karoline Eichhorn as Rebekka Rohm
- Doris Schade as Hilde Rohm
- Peter Roggisch as Chief Prosecutor Heribert Vogt
- Bastian Trost as Felix Hillmann
- Peter Rühring as Dr. Füglein
- Michaela Rosen as Judge Gunda Friedrichs
- Traugott Buhre as Dabrowski
- Stephan Schwartz as Daniel Ginsberg
- Heinz Trixner as Müller
- Detlef Bothe as Siebert
- Volker Risch as Prosecutor
- Frank Röth as Wendler
- Peer Martiny as Adlatus Vogt
- Jockel Tschiersch as Commissioner Wichmann
- Michael Schenk as Judge Kürten
