= He Met Her =

American band

- Origin: Los Angeles, California, United States
- Years active: 2009–present
- Members: Mowgli Moon; Rocky Chance
- Website: hemethermusic.com

He Met Her is a group originally formed in 2009 in Los Angeles, California and started recording six months later. The band is formed of rapper/producer/singer/actor Mowgli Moon (last seen in the movie Anonymous) who apparently was born in the city of Chihuahua, Mexico and LA-girl and singer/modell/actress Rocky Chance. Chance was featured as one of the main models in two of four commercials premiered by Budweiser during Super Bowl 2013

Most frequently referred inspirations are to the movie Drive, and their sound has been described as "disco to dub, and dancehall to twinkling pop" and "with the release of their first video for single 'Control' the band have instantly found appreciation from MTV, who promptly placed them on their Buzzworthy list. They've also attracted attention from the fashion world, having found themselves subjects of Elle cover photographer Rankin for a shoot last year.

== History ==
=== 2009–13: Formation and Debut EP ===
The duo met at LA-hotspot Nobu where Rocky Chance was maître d' and Mowgli used to hang out. He asked if she could sing and six months later they released their first single 'Take Me Tonight' a glossy, synth-driven medley of vocals, building on themes from Drive, layered with steady, grooving rhythm. Following the release they went to Berlin to live and record for six months. The duo has toured England extensively and has and underground following in both in their "second homes" London and Berlin. He Met Her does most of their recordings at their studio called Le Dungeon in a Moroccan compound in West Hollywood. Le Dungeon is also an artist collective which creates music together, and have their own merchandise.

=== Career beginnings: Rocky Chance ===
Rocky Chance grew up in the San Fernando Valley, the oldest child of modeling couple Paulette Banoza and Vito Banoza. Paulette is famous for her stint in Eddie Murphy´s comedy Coming to America. One of the running gags in the film involves Eriq La Salle's ridiculous Jheri curl. At one point, we see a commercial for the product he uses, where Paulette Banoza together with Clyde R. Jones is one of the two Soul Glo models. Her dad Vito Banoza is a Croatian model who has done commercials for companies like Armani, the two met while both working as models in Vienna in the 80s. The birth of Rocky Chance followed shortly after.
