= List of 2008 box office number-one films in Canada =

This is a list of films which have placed number one at the weekend box office in Canada during 2008.

== Weekend gross list ==
†	This implies the highest-grossing movie of the year.

#	Weekend End Date	Film	Weekend Gross (millions)	Notes
1	January 6, 2008	National Treasure: Book of Secrets	$1.65	
2	January 13, 2008	The Bucket List	$1.48	
3	January 20, 2008	Cloverfield	$2.26	
4	January 27, 2008	Rambo	$1.71	Meet the Spartans was #1 in North America.
5	February 3, 2008	27 Dresses	$0.94	27 Dresses reached #1 in its third weekend of release. Hannah Montana & Miley Cyrus: Best of Both Worlds Concert was #1 in North America.
6	February 10, 2008	Fool's Gold	$1.55	
7	February 17, 2008	Jumper	$2.06	
8	February 24, 2008	Vantage Point	$1.55	
9	March 2, 2008	Semi-Pro	$1.30	
10	March 9, 2008	10,000 B.C	$2.49	
11	March 16, 2008	Horton Hears a Who!	$2.89	
12	March 23, 2008	Horton Hears a Who!	$1.99	
13	March 30, 2008	21	$2.17	
14	April 6, 2008	21	$1.63	
15	April 13, 2008	Prom Night	$1.25	
16	April 20, 2008	The Forbidden Kingdom	$1.77	
17	April 27, 2008	Harold & Kumar Escape from Guantanamo Bay	$2.34	Baby Mama was #1 in North America.
18	May 4, 2008	Iron Man	$7.49	
19	May 11, 2008	Iron Man	$3.93	
20	May 18, 2008	The Chronicles of Narnia: Prince Caspian	$4.11	
21	May 25, 2008	Indiana Jones and the Kingdom of the Crystal Skull	$7.00	
22	June 1, 2008	Sex and the City	$4.88	
23	June 8, 2008	Kung Fu Panda	$3.53	
24	June 15, 2008	The Incredible Hulk	$3.07	
25	June 22, 2008	Get Smart	$2.42	
26	June 29, 2008	Wanted	$3.10	WALL-E was #1 in North America.
27	July 6, 2008	Hancock	$3.67	
28	July 13, 2008	Hellboy II: The Golden Army	$2.50	
29	July 20, 2008	The Dark Knight †	$10.53	The Dark Knight had the highest weekend debut of 2008.
30	July 27, 2008	The Dark Knight †	$5.84	
31	August 3, 2008	The Dark Knight †	$3.65	
32	August 10, 2008	The Dark Knight †	$2.39	
33	August 17, 2008	Tropic Thunder	$2.11	
34	August 24, 2008	Tropic Thunder	$1.45	
35	August 31, 2008	Tropic Thunder	$1.48	
36	September 7, 2008	Bangkok Dangerous	$0.80	
37	September 14, 2008	Burn After Reading	$1.75	
38	September 21, 2008	Burn After Reading	$1.15	Lakeview Terrace was #1 in North America.
39	September 28, 2008	Eagle Eye	$2.20	
40	October 5, 2008	Eagle Eye	$1.16	Beverly Hills Chihuahua was #1 in North America.
41	October 12, 2008	Body of Lies	$1.18	Beverly Hills Chihuahua was #1 in North America.
42	October 19, 2008	Max Payne	$1.50	
43	October 26, 2008	Saw V	$3.74	High School Musical 3: Senior Year was #1 in North America.
44	November 2, 2008	Zack & Miri Make a Porno	$1.53	High School Musical 3: Senior Year was #1 in North America.
45	November 9, 2008	Madagascar: Escape 2 Africa	$5.01	
46	November 16, 2008	Quantum of Solace	$7.64	
47	November 23, 2008	Twilight	$5.30	
48	November 30, 2008	Twilight	$2.52	Four Christmases was #1 in North America.
49	December 7, 2008	Twilight	$1.52	Four Christmases was #1 in North America.
50	December 14, 2008	The Day the Earth Stood Still	$1.81	
51	December 21, 2008	Yes Man	$1.22	
52	December 28, 2008	The Curious Case of Benjamin Button	$2.22	Marley & Me was #1 in North America.

== Highest-grossing films in Canada ==
Rank	Title	Studio	Total Gross (in millions)	Notes
1	The Dark Knight	Warner Bros.	$50.69	
2	Indiana Jones and the Kingdom of the Crystal Skull	Paramount	$27.69	
3	Iron Man	Paramount	$26.22	
4	Quantum of Solace	Columbia	$22.56	
5	Mamma Mia!	Universal	$18.63	
6	Hancock	Columbia	$18.50	
7	Twilight	Summit	$18.01	
8	WALL-E	Disney/Pixar	$17.38	
9	Kung Fu Panda	Paramount/DreamWorks	$17.04	
10	Slumdog Millionaire	Fox Searchlight	$16.70	
11	Madagascar: Escape 2 Africa	Paramount/DreamWorks	$16.49	
12	Sex and the City	Warner Bros.	$16.29	
13	The Curious Case of Benjamin Button	Paramount	$13.26	
14	Wanted	Universal	$11.86	
15	The Chronicles of Narnia: Prince Caspian	Disney	$11.84	
16	Tropic Thunder	Paramount/DreamWorks	$11.69	
17	Step Brothers	Columbia	$11.37	
18	Journey to the Center of the Earth	Warner Bros.	$11.34	
19	Get Smart	Warner Bros.	$11.33	
20	Horton Hears a Who!	Fox	$11.10	
21	The Incredible Hulk	Universal	$9.86	
22	Gran Torino	Warner Bros.	$9.74	
23	10,000 B.C.	Warner Bros.	$9.74	
24	Eagle Eye	Paramount/DreamWorks	$9.56	
25	21	Columbia	$9.31	

== See also ==
- List of Canadian films
