= Thure Riefenstein =

German actor and film director

- Born: Thure Riefenstein
- Occupations: Actor, Director, Producer, Writer
- Years active: 1998–present

Thure Riefenstein is a German actor, director, writer, and producer.

== Personal life ==
Riefenstein was born in Germany of Austrian and Serbian descent. He speaks German, English, French and Spanish.

== Career ==
Riefenstein graduated in 1989 from acting school in Germany, worked for five years on stage in Berlin and continued studying acting and film in New York and Los Angeles. He since has been working internationally for cinema, television and theater in the United States, Canada, Germany, Great Britain, France, Italy, Austria, Russia, Czech Republic, Sweden, Serbia, Morocco and Turkey.

His notable films include the US-Canadian feature Sophie, with John Rhys-Davies and Deborah Kara Unger. In the Golden Czech Lion Award winning WW2 drama Dark Blue World, he played for director and Academy Award Winner Jan Svěrák and in the action thriller Hostile Takeover, he worked with director Carl Schenkel. In the US-German feature Baltic Storm, he took a leading part alongside Greta Scacchi, Jürgen Prochnow, and Donald Sutherland. In 2012, he worked with Academy Award winner Steven Soderbergh in Behind the Candelabra and acted alongside Michael Douglas, Matt Damon and Dan Aykroyd. He played August in the feature Willie and Me, starring country icon Willie Nelson, and in 2018, he finished shooting the part of the Captain in the epic WW2 movie Torpedo, aka U-235.

Riefenstein's acclaimed TV work includes the French period movie Julie, chevalier de Maupin, where he starred with Marisa Berenson, Pierre Arditi and Gottfried John and which garnered an 'International Emmy Award' nomination for best foreign film. The TV series Kommissarin Lucas (Detective Lukas), with Riefenstein as the male leading detective, received the highly acclaimed German Adolf Grimme Award nomination for Best Film. In the film The Night a Village Vanished he was nominated for Best Lead Male Actor (Bambi Audience Award 2009 & Quotenmeter Award 2010) and was also a semi finalist for the International Emmy Award in 2010 in the same category. He guest starred in the American series Leverage (TNT) with Academy Award winner Timothy Hutton and also in The Brink (HBO) where he acted alongside Academy Award winner Tim Robbins. In the Syfy series 12 Monkeys, he guest starred as SS-Sturmbannführer Waesch in the episode Die Glocke alongside Barbara Sukowa and Amanda Shull.

Riefenstein starred in the European action drama mini-series The Crusaders, with Armin Mueller-Stahl and Franco Nero, the successful feature comedy 666: In Bed with the Devil, the Canadian film Criminal Instinct with Victor Garber, and the science fiction feature Ainoa.

Riefenstein is a trained theater actor and has performed theatrical plays such as Shakespeare's Pericles, Bertolt Brecht's Life of Galileo, Walter Jens's The Downfall, Ariane Mnouchkine's Mephisto and also in musicals such as Linie 1 or the revue The Blue Angel where he played with Ute Lemper at the Theater des Westens in Berlin and the Hamburger Schauspielhaus. The show was directed by longtime theater directors Peter Zadek and Jérôme Savary. Riefenstein also worked with Bertolt Brecht's former assistant Peter Palitzsch on Pericles at the Berliner Ensemble and with Vlad Mugur on Carlo Goldoni's The Liar. His latest theatre work was in Captain Greedy's Carnival (2018), a production of Tim Robbins' group The Actors' Gang.

Riefenstein lived in London to practice working in fringe theatre and in New York to work with Kristin Linklater. His American debut was in the New York production of Jean Genet's The Maids for the Berkshire Theatre Festival. In Los Angeles, he studied acting at the ACI based on Lee Strasberg's and Sandford Meisner's working techniques and worked with several coaches such as Doug Warhit, Sam Christensen, Bruce Davison and Michelle Danner. He trained at the Actors Gang in Culver City with Cynthia Ettinger and Tim Robbins, where he worked as an associate member for a year.

Riefenstein is also a director, producer and writer for the movie industry. His voice over work includes Call of Duty: Black Ops Cold War and the Wolfenstein sequels The New Colossus and The New Order.

Riefenstein is married to author Patricia Lueger and has a son named Paris Aaron Lazar Riefenstein (born 2003).

== Awards ==
His distinctions as an actor include a Bambi Audience Award and an International Emmy Award nomination in 2010 and 2009 for Boeseckendorf - The Night a Village Vanished, an Adolf Grimme Award nomination for Best Film in 2007 for Kommissarin Lukas, an International Emmy Award nomination for Best Mini-Series in 2005 for Julie, chevalier du Maupin. As a director, he received the German Film Classification Board rating of "highly valuable movie" for God Is No Soprano in 2003 and in 1995 for Lonely Nights.

== Partial filmography ==
- 1998: Oskar und Leni (Nomination for Adolf Grimme Award, Nomination for Max Ophüls Award), (theatrical)
- 1998: Best of the Best 4: Without Warning (theatrical)
- 1998: Doppeltes Spiel mit Anne (movie for TV)
- 1998: Romantic Fighter (movie for TV)
- 1998: Pensacola: Wings of Gold (movie for TV), USA, Dir.: James Brolin, Cast: James Brolin, Sandra Hess, Kenny Johnson, a.o.
- 1998: Scent of Seduction (movie for TV)
- 1999: Der letzte Zeuge: Die Erpressung (movie for TV)
- 1999: Kein Weg zurück (movie for TV)
- 2000: Mary Magdalene (DE, IT), (movie for TV)
- 2000: Anna H. – Geliebte, Ehefrau und Hure (movie for TV)
- 2000: Hostile Takeover (theatrical)
- 2000: The Beast (movie for TV)
- 2001: The Crusaders (DE, IT), (Mini Series) Dir.: Dominique Othenin Girard, Cast: Allesandro Gassman, Armin Mueller-Stahl, Franco Nero, Uwe Ochsenknecht, a.o.
- 2001: Dark Blue World (CZ, GB) (Czech Golden Lion, European Film Award, u. a.), (theatrical) Dir.: Jan Svěrák, Cast: Ondřej Vetchý, Kryštof Hádek, Tara Fitzgerald, Charles Dance, a.o.
- 2001: The Wandering Soul Murders (CAN), (Golden Reel Award, USA), (movie for TV) Dir: Brad Turner, Cast: Wendy Crewson, Victor Garber, a.o.
- 2002: Seven Moves to Checkmate (movie for TV)
- 2003: Baltic Storm (DE), (theatrical) Cast: Greta Scacchi, Jürgen Prochnow, Donald Sutherland, a.o.
- 2003: Ainoa (A), (theatrical)
- 2003: Heiraten macht mich nervös (Marrying makes me nervous), (movie for TV)
- 2003: Kommissarin Lucas: Die blaue Blume (movie for TV, special)
- 2003: Im Namen des Herrn (movie for TV)
- 2003: Polizeiruf 110: Tiefe Wunden (Adolf Grimme Award), (movie for TV)
- 2004: Kommissarin Lucas: Vertrauen bis zuletzt (movie for TV, special)
- 2004: Kommissarin Lucas: Vergangene Sünden (movie for TV, special)
- 2004: Rose unter Dornen (movie for TV)
- 2004: Julie, Chevalier de Maupin (France) (nomination for "international Emmy Award"), (Mini Series) Dir.: Charlotte Brandström, Cast: Sarah Biasini, Pierre Arditi, Jürgen Prochnow, Marissa Berenson, Gottfried John, a.o.
- 2006: Kommissarin Lucas: Das Verhör (Grimmepreis nomination), (movie for TV, special)
- 2006: Kommissarin Lucas: Skizze einer Toten (movie for TV, special)
- 2006: Wachgeküsst (movie for TV)
- 2007: Alarm für Cobra 11: Todfeinde (movie for TV)
- 2007: Kommissarin Lucas: German Angst (movie for TV)
- 2007: Kommissarin Lucas: Das Totenschiff (movie for TV, special)
- 2008: Kommissarin Lucas: Wut im Bauch (movie for TV, special)
- 2008: Der Amokläufer (movie for TV)
- 2008: Jack Hunter and the Lost Treasure of Ugarit (mini series), Sci-fi Channel (US release) Dir.: Terry Cunningham, Cast: Ivan Sergei, Joanne Kelly, a.o.
- 2008: Jack Hunter and the Star of Heaven (mini series), Sci-fi Channel (US release)
- 2008: Jack Hunter and the Quest for Akhenaten's Tomb (mini series), Sci-fi Channel (US release) Cast: Ivan Sergei, Joanne Kelly, a.o.)
- 2009: A Date for Life (movie for TV)
- 2009: The Night a Village Vanished, TV-Event Film, nomination for "Bambi audience award 2009", Quotenmeter Award: "Best lead actor"
- 2009: High Society Murder – Das eitle Gesicht des Todes (movie for TV)
- 2009: Thanksgiving (movie for TV)
- 2010: The Whore (movie for TV)
- 2011: Inga Lindström: Das dunkle Haus (movie for TV)
- 2011: Machtergreifung (Hitler – The Takeover) (Movie for TV)
- 2011: Sophie, USA, Canada, (theatrical), Dir.: Leif Bristow, Cast: Brittany Bristow, John Rhys Davies, Augustus Prew, Donna Kara Unger a.o.
- 2012: Inseln vor dem Wind (movie for TV)
- 2012: Leverage: The Blue Line Job (TNT, USA) Dir.: Mark Roskin, Cast: Timothy Hutton, Gina Bellman, Christian Kane, Beth Riesgraf, Aldis Hoge, a.o.
- 2013: Behind the Candelabra (USA) Dir.: Steven Soderbergh, Cast: Michael Douglas, Matt Damon, Dan Aykroyd a.o.
- 2013: Schwestern, Dir.: Olaf Krainsen, Cast: Sophie Schütt, Alwara Höfels, a.o,
- 2014: My Whole Half Life (mini series for TV)
- 2014: The Old Gun (mini series for TV, Russia)
- 2014: Der Geruch von Erde (feature for TV)
- 2014: Der Alte: Der Tod in dir (feature for TV)
- 2014: Kreuzfahrt ins Glück: Hochzeitsreise nach Dubai
- 2015: SOKO 5113: Der Rattenfänger (TV-Series)
- 2015: The Cello Player (Short-Feature, USA)
- 2015: The Brink: Sticky Wicket (Series, USA), Dir.: Michael Lehmann, Cast: Tim Robbins, Jack Black, a.o.
- 2016: Inga Lindström: Familienbande (TV Movie), Dir.: John Delbridge
- 2016: Der Staatsanwalt: Der Schein trügt (TV Movie, DE), Dir.: Martin Kinkel
- 2016: SOKO Donau: Der Preis der Macht (Series, DE), Dir.: Erhard Riedlsberger
- 2016: The Man in the High Castle: Fallout (Series, USA), Dir.: Daniel Percival
- 2017: X Company: Friendly Fire (Series, CA), Dir.: Stephanie Morgenstern
- 2017: Kept Boy (Feature, US), Dir.: George Bamber
- 2017: Die Chefin: Glaube, Liebe, Hoffnung (Series, DE), Dir.: Florian Kern
- 2017: Letzte Spur Berlin: Ehrenamt (Series, DE), Dir.: Peter Ladkani
- 2017: Die Spezialisten: Diamantenfieber (Series, DE), Dir.: Kerstin Ahlrichs
- 2018: Cologne P.D.: Fatale Begierde (Series, DE), Dir.: Joerg Mielich
- 2018: 12 Monkeys: Die Glocke (Series, USA), Dir.: David Grossman, Terry Matalas
- 2019: Die Spezialisten: Gespenster (Series, DE), Dir.: Steffi Doehlemann
- 2018/2019: Willie and Me (Feature, USA), Dir.: Eva Hassmann
- 2019: Eneme (Feature, DE, RU), Dir.: Jakob Gisik
- 2019: Torpedo aka U-235 (Feature, Be), Dir.: Sven Huybrechts
- 2021: V2. Escape from Hell: Kommandant Berghoff
- 2023: MAYA (Feature, USA) Dir.: Julia Verdin

== Director/Writer/Producer credits (partial) ==
- 1994: Lonely Nights (comedy, English) (German Board of Film Classification: "Highly Valuable Movie")
- 2003: God Is No Soprano (comedy, English) (Filmfestival Audience Award; German Film Classification: "Highly Valuable Movie")
- 2007: Hagen (writer, producer)
- 2015: Leon (writer, producer)
- 2017: Book of Skulls (writer)
- 2023: Taffkuki (comedy, English/German), (writer, producer, director)

== Sources ==
- tvguide.com
- https://www.argunners.com/trailer-torpedo-u235-2019/
