= Jack Hunter (film series) =

2008 American film series

- Country of origin: United States
- Original language: English

Original release
- Release: December 30, 2008 – July 31, 2010

Jack Hunter is a 2008 American archeological adventure mini-series (in the vein of the Indiana Jones franchise). It consists of three parts: Jack Hunter and the Lost Treasure of Ugarit, Jack Hunter and the Quest for Akhenaten's Tomb and Jack Hunter and the Star of Heaven with Hunter played by Ivan Sergei.

== Plot ==
=== Part 1 ===
The film begins with Jack stealing a stone tablet from a French museum... Young archaeologist Jack Hunter planned only to take a picture of a cuneiform tablet from once unsurpassed Mesopotamian metropolis Ugarit in present Syria, but is caught and has to steal it from a private museum in France. He refuses to join his mentor, professor Frederic "Freddie" Shaffer, who believes the poem is a coded treasure map, on a relic hunt, until his friend is murdered to steal it. The obvious suspect is Syrian artifact trader Ali, so Jack flies to Damascus. There he must accept working with local, US-educated colleague Nadia and her driver Tariq. Their lives are threatened during the long relic quest, for one by common nemesis Albert Littman, but another secret lurks too.

=== Part 2 ===
Akhenaten, a pharaoh who raided Ugarit, stole its treasure and the second piece of the Star of Heaven. If Jack and his team find the tomb, they will find the treasure and the Star. Loads of action and mystery await.

=== Part 3 ===
The final piece of the puzzle and final film in the film series. It seems the Romans got to Akhenaten's Tomb first. The race is on to see if Jack and his friends can find the treasure and recover the Iris back from Littmann and the Russians.

== Cast ==
Characters	Films		
Characters	The Lost Treasure of Ugarit	Quest for Akhenaten's Tomb	The Star of Heaven
Jack Hunter	Ivan Sergei	Ivan Sergei	Ivan Sergei
Nadia Ramadan	Joanne Kelly	Joanne Kelly	Joanne Kelly
Albert Littmann	Thure Riefenstein	Thure Riefenstein	Thure Riefenstein
Lena Halstrom		Alaina Huffman	Alaina Huffman
Liz	Susan Ward	Susan Ward	Susan Ward
Tariq	Mario Naim Bassil	Mario Naim Bassil	Mario Naim Bassil
Doridanov	Mehmet Polat	Mehmet Polat	Mehmet Polat
Said		Tuncel Kurtiz	
Mustafa		Sinan Tuzcu	
Riyad		Savas Özdemir	
Eyhab		Alper Kul	
Boat captain		Orbay Sayu	
Truck driver		Volga Sorgu	
Egyptian soldier		Emre Cosar	
Egyptian worker		Can Çelebi	
Fuad Antaki			Mert Yavuzcan
Petrovsky			Teoman Kumbaracibasi
Inspector Fatih			Fatih Haciosmanoglu
Armen Antaki			Michael Halphie
Widow			Esin Eden
Monk			Tansu Biçer
Young woman			Silay Ünal
Nun			Lilie Lossen

== Reception ==
The series has been described as a low-budget blatant ripoff of Indiana Jones. Jumping Sharks' review described it as "a completely original miniseries, in no way stealing anything at all from Indiana Jones. Nope. No sireee. Well, maybe just a bit. Okay, maybe a bit more than a bit. Oh, alright – they basically copied Indiana Jones, right down to his trademarked hat."

Jack Hunter generally received mixed reviews from critics. One reviewer from Die Welt, however, did praise the series, saying, "As the successor to Indiana Jones, [Jack Hunter] does the adventurer credit."
