= The Crusaders (2001 film) =

- I Crociati
- Written by: Andrea Porporati
- Directed by: Dominique Othenin-Girard
- Starring: Alessandro Gassman; Thure Riefenstein; Franco Nero
- Music by: Harald Kloser; Thomas Wanker
- Country of origin: Italy; Germany
- Original language: Italian

Production
- Cinematography: Federico Masiero
- Editor: Alessandro Lucidi

Original release
- Release: 2001

The Crusaders (original title: Crociati) is a 2001 Italian adventure, drama television mini-series written by Andrea Porporati and directed by Dominique Othenin-Girard. The film was also dubbed in English and other languages.

== Plot ==
In the 11th century, three friends flee from an Italian city and make their way to the Holy Land to take part in the First Crusade.

== Cast ==
- Alessandro Gassman as Peter
- Thure Riefenstein as Andrew
- Johannes Brandrup as Richard
- Barbora Bobuľová as Rachel
- Uwe Ochsenknecht as Baron Corrado
- Flavio Insinna as Peter Bartholomew
- Armin Mueller-Stahl as Alessio
- Franco Nero as Ibn-Azul
- Miloš Timotijević as Johann
- Karin Proia as Maria
- Slobodan Ninkovic as Olaf Gunnarson

== See also ==
- List of historical drama films
