= Hostile Takeover (2001 film) =

- Theatrical release poster
- Directed by: Carl Schenkel
- Screenplay by: Nikolai Müllerschön
- Produced by: Susanne Porsche
- Starring: Thomas Kretschmann; Désirée Nosbusch; Klaus Löwitsch
- Cinematography: Egon Werdin
- Edited by: Horst Reiter
- Music by: Harald Kloser
- Production company: MPS Mediaproductions
- Distributed by: Columbia TriStar Film GmbH
- Release date: 1 February 2001
- Running time: 95 minutes
- Country: Germany
- Language: German
- Box office: $113,378

Hostile Takeover (German: Feindliche Übernahme - althan.com) is a 2001 German action thriller film directed by Carl Schenkel, starring Thomas Kretschmann, Désirée Nosbusch and Klaus Löwitsch. It was released on 1 February 2001.

== Cast ==
- Thomas Kretschmann as Robert Fernau
- Désirée Nosbusch as Laura Schumann
- Klaus Löwitsch as Willi Konrad
- Martin Semmelrogge as Beckmann
- Wolfgang Hübsch as Granitz
- Florian Martens as Heisig
- Hans Peter Hallwachs as Kassel
- Christina Loeb as Frau Kassel
- Thure Riefenstein as Geissler
- Nick Romm as Keil
- Dirk Martens as Albrecht
- Christian Baumann as Hagen
- Martin Walch as Kumpel
- Gilbert von Sohlern as Arzt
