= RFK (film) =

- DVD cover
- Genre: Historical drama
- Written by: Hank Steinberg
- Directed by: Robert Dornhelm
- Starring: Linus Roache; David Paymer; Martin Donovan; Jacob Vargas; Marnie McPhail; Sergio Di Zio; Sean Sullivan; Ving Rhames; James Cromwell
- Music by: Harald Kloser; Thomas Wanker
- Country of origin: United States
- Original language: English

Production
- Executive producers: Robert Cooper; Tom Patricia
- Producer: Mark Winemaker
- Cinematography: Derick V. Underschultz
- Editor: Victor Du Bois
- Running time: 94 minutes
- Production companies: Artisan Television; Fox Television Studios

Original release
- Network: FX
- Release: August 25, 2002

RFK is a 2002 American biographical historical drama television film directed by Robert Dornhelm and written by Hank Steinberg. The film stars Linus Roache as Robert F. Kennedy. David Paymer, Martin Donovan, Jacob Vargas, Marnie McPhail, Sergio Di Zio, Sean Sullivan, Ving Rhames and James Cromwell also star. It was produced by Artisan Television and Fox Television Studios and premiered on FX on August 25, 2002.

The film takes place through the eyes of RFK after his brother John F. Kennedy's assassination in 1963. As he lives through the loss, he starts to identify himself as a political figure, not just the former president's brother. He makes it official with a 1968 United States presidential election bid in order, what he says, to "save the Democratic Party". During his campaign, in which the American people showed great support for him, RFK was shot and killed by pro-Palestinian activist Sirhan Sirhan as a statement against Kennedy's unwavering support of Israel.

The film was shot in Hamilton, Ontario, Canada.

== Cast ==
- Linus Roache as Robert F. Kennedy
- David Paymer as Richard Goodwin
- Martin Donovan as John F. Kennedy
- Jacob Vargas as Cesar Chavez
- Marnie McPhail as Ethel Kennedy
- Sergio Di Zio as Adam Walinsky
- Sean Sullivan as Stephen Edward Smith
- Ving Rhames as Judge Jones
- James Cromwell as Lyndon B. Johnson
- Kevin Hare as Ted Kennedy
- Rodger Barton as Sheriff
- Corinne Conley as Rose Kennedy
- Phil Craig as John A. McCone
- Jordan Fennell as Jordan
- Neil Foster as Mayor
- David Gardner as Joseph Kennedy Sr.
- Judith Goodwin as Evelyn Lincoln
- Nigel Hamer as Stand-up Reporter
- Jonathan Higgins as Peter Edelman
- David Huband as Reporter #1
- Bill Lake as Mr. Murphy
- Colm Magner as Reporter #2
- Dwight McFee as Painter
- Michael Rhoades as Reporter #3
- Kim Roberts as Joshua's mother
- Sheila Shotton as Speech Therapist
- Fernando Valladares as Priest
- Joshua Watkis as Joshua
- Timm Zemanek as Dr. Coles

== See also ==
- Robert F. Kennedy in media
