= Willie and Me =

Comedy-drama film by Eva Hassmann

- Directed by: Eva Hassmann
- Written by: Eva Hassmann
- Produced by: Eva Hassmann
- Starring: Eva Hassmann; Willie Nelson; Peter Bogdanovich; Blaine Gray; Thure Riefenstein; Darby Stanchfield
- Cinematography: Marco Cappetta
- Edited by: Ting Yu
- Music by: Jherek Bischoff
- Production companies: Skyvalley Productions; Hassmann Production Company
- Distributed by: Quiver Distribution
- Release dates: September 2023 (Oldenburg Film Festival); February 9, 2024 (United States)
- Running time: 87 minutes
- Countries: Germany; United States
- Language: English

Willie and Me is a 2023 German-American independent road comedy-drama film written and directed by Eva Hassmann in her directorial debut. The film stars Hassmann, Willie Nelson, Peter Bogdanovich (in his last screen appearance), Blaine Gray, Thure Riefenstein and Darby Stanchfield. The film follows a German housewife in a troubled marriage who travels to the United States for Willie Nelson's farewell concert. The film production began in 2013 and spent eight years in development hell due to financing problems.

The film premiered at the Oldenburg International Film Festival on September 13, 2023. It was released by Quiver Distribution in theaters and on demand on February 9, 2024.

== Cast ==
- Eva Hassmann as Greta Weingarten
- Willie Nelson as Willie Nelson/Bones
- Peter Bogdanovich as Charley
- Blaine Gray as Nick
- Thure Riefenstein as August Halsig
- Darby Stanchfield as Rebecca

== Reception ==
The film received mostly negative reviews from critics. On the review aggregator website Rotten Tomatoes, 20% of 5 critics' reviews are positive, with an average rating of 4.1/10.

The Hollywood Reporter critic Frank Scheck gave it a positive review writing: "Much like the songs of Willie Nelson that populate its soundtrack, the film relies on a general uplifting atmosphere as the indefatigable Greta stops at nothing to fulfill her dream." Film critic Matt Zoller Seitz of RogerEbert.com gave the film one and a half stars writing: "It might have worked in spite of itself if Hassmann's performance were powerful enough to gather it all up and unify it through sheer originality and energy. But while she's an attractive, likable, sympathetic lead, there's no discernible comic point-of-view to her performance, and her physical resemblance to Madeline Kahn circa-1970s doesn't do her any favors. You may find yourself imagining what a brilliant, constantly surprising performer like Kahn, or a modern equivalent like Kristen Wiig, or an unknown who was more of a dynamo, might have done instead."
