= Kommissarin Lucas =

- Starring: Ulrike Kriener
- Country of origin: Germany
- Original language: German
- No. of episodes: 27

Production
- Running time: 90 minutes

Original release
- Network: ZDF
- Release: 1 March 2003

Kommissarin Lucas is a German series of telefilms set in Regensburg and Nuremberg, Bavaria, in southeastern Germany. It streams in some English-language countries as "Detective Ellen Lucas." The series had starred Ulrike Kriener in the title role of Ellen Lucas, Chief Detective Commissioner and Michael Roll as Boris Noethen, First Commissioner. ZDF has been broadcasting the series since March 1, 2003. Each of the episodes are feature length and consequently only two to three are shown per year. Kriener won a Bavarian TV Award in 2005 for her work in this series.

== See also ==
- List of German television series
