= White House Down =

2013 American action film by Roland Emmerich

- Theatrical release poster
- Directed by: Roland Emmerich
- Written by: James Vanderbilt
- Produced by: Bradley J. Fischer; Harald Kloser; James Vanderbilt; Larry Franco; Laeta Kalogridis
- Starring: Channing Tatum; Jamie Foxx; Maggie Gyllenhaal; Jason Clarke; Richard Jenkins; James Woods
- Cinematography: Anna Foerster
- Edited by: Adam Wolfe
- Music by: Harald Kloser; Thomas Wander
- Production companies: Columbia Pictures; Mythology Entertainment; Centropolis Entertainment
- Distributed by: Sony Pictures Releasing
- Release date: June 28, 2013
- Running time: 131 minutes
- Country: United States
- Language: English
- Budget: $150 million
- Box office: $205 million

White House Down is a 2013 American political action thriller film directed by Roland Emmerich and written by James Vanderbilt. The film stars Channing Tatum, Jamie Foxx, Maggie Gyllenhaal, Jason Clarke, Richard Jenkins, Joey King, and James Woods. In the film, a divorced U.S. Capitol Police officer attempts to rescue both his daughter and the president of the United States when a destructive terrorist assault occurs in the White House.

Released on June 28, 2013, by Sony Pictures Releasing through its Columbia Pictures label, White House Down received mixed reviews from critics. The film grossed $205 million against a budget of $150M, making it a box-office bomb. White House Down was one of two 2013 films that dealt with a terrorist attack on the White House; the other, Olympus Has Fallen, was released three months earlier.

== Plot ==
U.S. president James Sawyer makes a controversial proposal to sign a peace agreement with other nations to remove military forces from the Middle East. Divorced veteran John Cale works as a Capitol Police officer assigned to Speaker of the House Eli Raphelson, whose nephew he saved while serving in Afghanistan. Cale hopes to impress his 11-year-old daughter, Emily, by interviewing for the Secret Service and getting tickets for them to tour the White House. His interviewer, Deputy Special Agent-in-Charge Carol Finnerty, a college acquaintance, deems him unqualified for the job.

A bomb is detonated in the United States Capitol, sending Washington, D.C. into lockdown. Finnerty escorts Raphelson to an underground command center in the Pentagon, while Vice President Alvin Hammond is taken aboard Air Force One. A paramilitary team led by corrupt former Delta Force operator Emil Stenz infiltrates the White House, after killing various Secret Service agents, seizes the first family's home. The tour group is taken hostage in the Blue Room by white nationalist Carl Killick, but Cale escapes to search for Emily, who was separated from the rest of the tour group. Retiring Head of Presidential Detail Martin Walker brings Sawyer to the Presidential Emergency Operations Center (PEOC), beneath the White House Library. Inside, Walker kills Sawyer's task forces and reveals himself as the commander of the White House attack; he is evidently seeking vengeance against Sawyer for a botched mission in Iran that killed his Marine son Kevin a year earlier. Cale kills a mercenary, taking his weapon and radio, and rescues Sawyer after eavesdropping on Walker.

Walker brings in ex-NSA analyst Skip Tyler to hack the PEOC's defense system, but he needed Sawyer to activate the nuclear football. Killick catches Emily for recording on her phone and takes her hostage. Cale and Sawyer contact the command structure via a scrambled satellite phone in the residence and try to escape via a secret tunnel, but find the exit rigged with explosives. They escape in the presidential limousine, but are chased by Stenz and crash into the White House pool. With Sawyer and Cale presumed dead, the 25th Amendment is invoked and Hammond is sworn in as president. Cale and Sawyer, still alive, discover Hammond has ordered an aerial incursion to reclaim the White House despite Cale's protests. Although he intervenes, the mercenaries shoot down the helicopters with Javelin missiles. Learning Emily's identity from the video, Stenz takes her to Walker in the Oval Office. Tyler hacks into NORAD and fires a laser-guided missile at Air Force One from a silo in Piketon, Ohio, killing Hammond and everyone on board. Raphelson is sworn in as president and orders an airstrike on the White House.

Sawyer surrenders himself to save Emily. Walker, blaming Iran, not Sawyer, for his son's death, demands Sawyer use the football to launch nuclear missiles against various Iranian cities. Cale sets fire to several rooms as a diversion. Tyler inadvertently triggers the tunnel explosives while trying to escape and is killed instantly. Cale dispatches most of the mercenaries and frees the hostages, one of whom (White House tour guide Donnie Donaldson) fatally bludgeons Killick before he can kill Cale. Stenz engages with Cale and is blown up with a grenade belt. Sawyer attacks Walker, but in the fight, Walker uses Sawyer's handprint to activate the football and shoots Sawyer. Before Walker can finally launch the missiles, Cale crashes a reinforced Chevrolet Suburban into the Oval Office and kills him with the car's minigun. Emily runs outside and waves off the incoming fighter planes with a presidential flag, and the lead air strike pilot aborts the attack. Sawyer survives thanks to a pocket watch that once belonged to Abraham Lincoln stopping Walker's bullet.

With Finnerty’s help, Cale realizes that Raphelson was Walker's accomplice and the mastermind behind the attack, having acted at the behest of the corrupt military–industrial complex. Believing Sawyer dead and that nobody would trust Cale's story, Raphelson is double-crossed into confessing and is arrested for treason. He swears revenge before he is captured. Sawyer names Cale his new special agent and takes him and Emily on an aerial tour of D.C. on Marine One. During the tour, Sawyer receives word that other nations have agreed to his peace deal after learning of the events at the White House, calling for an end to all wars.

== Cast ==
- Channing Tatum as John Cale, an Afghanistan veteran and Capitol policeman who gets his daughter tickets to a special White House tour. Cale and his daughter are at the White House when it is attacked by mercenaries.
- Jamie Foxx as James Sawyer, President of the United States, who is the main target of an attack on the White House.
- Maggie Gyllenhaal as Carol Wilkes-Finnerty, Secret Service Presidential Detail Deputy Special Agent-in-Charge.
- Jason Clarke as Emil Stenz, a corrupt ex-Delta Force captain and rogue CIA operative who leads a group of mercenaries in infiltrating and taking over the White House.
- Richard Jenkins as Eli Raphelson, Speaker of the United States House of Representatives, who briefly assumes the Presidency after Sawyer is presumed dead and the Vice President is killed during an attack on Air Force One. He is the mastermind behind the White House attack.
- Joey King as Emily Cale, the daughter of officer John Cale.
- James Woods as Martin Walker, Secret Service Presidential Detail Special Agent-in-Charge and a participant in the attack on the White House.
- Nicolas Wright as Donnie Donaldson, White House Tour Guide.
- Jimmi Simpson as Skip Tyler, an ex-NSA cyber-security analyst turned hacker and the technical specialist amongst the White House attackers.
- Michael Murphy as Vice President Alvin Hammond, who briefly assumes the Presidency after Sawyer is claimed dead. He is later killed after Air Force One is attacked.
- Rachelle Lefevre as Melanie Schopp-Cale, John's former wife and Emily's mother.
- Lance Reddick as General Caulfield, Vice Chairman of the Joint Chiefs of Staff.
- Matt Craven as Roy Kellerman, Capitol Police officer.
- Jake Weber as Ted Hope, Secret Service agent.
- Peter Jacobson as Wallace, Chief of Staff to the Vice President.
- Garcelle Beauvais as Alison Sawyer, First Lady of the United States.
- Kevin Rankin as Carl Killick, a sociopathic white nationalist and one of Stenz's henchmen.
- Barbara Williams as Muriel Walker, Martin Walker's wife.
- Falk Hentschel as Motts, Stenz's friend and a secondary commander amongst the mercenaries.
- Jackie Geary as Jenna Bydwell, Hammond's aide and Cale's trusted confidant.
- Andrew Simms as Roger Skinner, a sleazy reporter and right-wing political commentator who criticizes Sawyer on his show.
- Vincent Leclerc as Ryan Todd, Secret Service agent.
- Anthony Lemke as Captain Paul Hutton.
- Kyle Gatehouse as Conrad Cern, Killick's associate, who bombs the Capitol rotunda as a diversion for the mercenaries.
- Patrick Sabongui as Bobby, Stenz's best friend for ten years.

== Production ==
White House Down is directed by Roland Emmerich and written by James Vanderbilt, who is also one of the film's producers. Sony Pictures purchased Vanderbilt's spec script in March 2012 for $3 million, in what The Hollywood Reporter called "one of the biggest spec sales in quite a while". The journal said the script was similar "tonally and thematically" to the films Die Hard (1988) and Air Force One (1997). In the following April, Sony hired Roland Emmerich as director. Emmerich began filming in July 2012 at the La Cité Du Cinéma in Montreal, Quebec, Canada. Cinematographer Anna Foerster shot the film with Arri Alexa Plus digital cameras.

In 2012, Sony competed with Millennium Films, who were producing Olympus Has Fallen (also about a takeover of the White House) to complete casting and to begin filming.

== Music ==
The soundtrack was composed by Harald Kloser and Thomas Wander, performed by the Hollywood Studio Symphony and released on July 23, 2013 by Varèse Sarabande.

== Release ==
White House Down was originally scheduled for a November 1, 2013 release, but was moved up to a June 28, 2013 release.

=== Home media ===
The film was released on DVD and Blu-ray on November 5, 2013.

== Reception ==
=== Critical response ===
On review aggregator Rotten Tomatoes the film holds an approval rating of 52% based on 200 reviews, with an average rating of 5.40/10. The website's critical consensus reads: "White House Down benefits from the leads' chemistry, but director Roland Emmerich smothers the film with narrative clichés and choppily edited action." At Metacritic the film has a weighted average score of 52 out of 100, based on 43 critics, indicating "mixed or average reviews". Audiences polled by CinemaScore gave the film an average grade of "A−" on an A+ to F scale.

Roth Cornet of IGN gave the film a score of 6.5/10, concluding: "White House Down is a pretty silly rehashing of previously tread action movie territory, but if you're willing to laugh along with (or even at) it, it can be a highly entertaining experience." Andrew Chan of the Film Critics Circle of Australia wrote, "I am not entirely sure, whether I should be happy or sad that I laughed when someone got shot or bombed, but such is the manner of how the film is played out." Mark Kermode of The Observer gave the film 3/5 stars, writing that it "at least has the good grace to laugh at itself as it rolls out the dingbat-daft action-movie cliches." Shubhra Gupta of The Indian Express gave the film 2.5/5 stars, writing: "Trouble is, it goes on too long. It has several climactic moments, but every time you ready for the exit, the film bounces back again for the next round." Peter Bradshaw of The Guardian gave the film 2/5 stars, saying that "real thrills – dependent on real, believable jeopardy – are not on offer: just cheerfully absurd spectacle and a little bit of humour."

=== Box office ===
White House Down grossed $73.1 million in the United States, and $132.3 million internationally, for a total gross of $205.4 million, against a budget of $150 million; it was a box office bomb.

The film made $24.8 million in North America during its opening weekend, coming in below expectations and finishing fourth at the box office.

== See also ==
- Ransom
- 15 Minutes
- XXX: State of the Union
- Vantage Point
- Salt
- Olympus Has Fallen
- Non-Stop
- Señora Acero
- The Night Agent
