= The Hollywood Standard =

Book about screenplay formatting

- Author: Christopher Riley
- Language: English
- Subject: Screenwriting, screenplay format
- Publisher: Michael Wiese Productions
- Publication date: 2005 (1st ed.), 2009 (2nd ed.), 2021 (3rd ed.)
- Publication place: United States
- Media type: Print (paperback), e-book
- Pages: 208 (3rd edition)
- ISBN: 9781615933228

The Hollywood Standard: The Complete and Authoritative Guide to Script Format and Style is a reference book on screenplay formatting by Christopher Riley, first published in 2005. The book provides detailed rules and examples for industry-standard formatting of screenplays and teleplays.

== Background ==
Christopher Riley worked for more than a decade in the Warner Bros. Script Processing Department before authoring The Hollywood Standard. The book was written to address common formatting questions faced by professional screenwriters and students.

== Academic usage ==
The Hollywood Standard has been adopted in university-level screenwriting courses as a required text. For example, the University of North Carolina at Chapel Hill lists the book on its Screenwriting 150 course syllabus as a primary reference for students learning industry-standard formatting and style conventions.

== Reception ==
The Hollywood Standard has received positive commentary from writers and reviewers. Screenwriter John August noted in 2007 that it is a "helpful and practical guide for newcomers" and "solid enough" to settle formatting questions. In 2023, The Cinema Fix called the book "the bible and a must buy for screenwriters," highlighting its clear examples and references to filmmakers such as the Coen brothers, Guillermo del Toro, Vince Gilligan, and Jordan Peele.

Other reviewers have emphasized both strengths and limitations. A review on Writer’s Supercenter’s "StudioNotes" column described the book as “VERY thorough… clear and concise” while also noting that it “did not answer every question.”

On Raindance in 2018, reviewer Sylvie Dumont praised the book’s ability to distill every formatting rule into clear industry standards, saying it allows writers to focus on “more interesting things, like their characters and stories.”

The book has also been mentioned on industry-focused media such as the Bulletproof Screenwriting podcast, where it was described as “the dictionary of script format.”

In 2005, Publishers Weekly praised the book’s clarity and practicality, noting that Riley “supplies what may be the first accurate, complete and practical guide to standard script formats.”

Microfilmmaker Magazine described the book as “not about aesthetics… simply about how to properly write a script that will be taken seriously.”

== Editions ==
- First edition (2005)
- Second edition (2009)
- Third edition (2021)

== Legacy ==
The book has been described as "definitive" and is used by professional screenwriters and in film schools across the United States.

== See also ==
- Screenwriting
- Film production
