= Giant (2009 film) =

- Film poster for United States release
- Directed by: Adrián Biniez
- Screenplay by: Adrián Biniez
- Produced by: Fernando Epstein; Christoph Friedel; Hernán Musaluppi; Frans van Gestel
- Starring: Horacio Camandule; Leonor Svarcas
- Cinematography: Arauco Hernández Holz
- Edited by: Fernando Epstein
- Music by: Harald Kloser; Thomas Wander
- Production company: Ctrl Films
- Distributed by: Filmmovement.com
- Release dates: February 8, 2009 (Berlinale); May 29, 2009 (Uruguay)
- Running time: 84 minutes
- Country: Uruguay
- Language: Spanish

Giant (Spanish: Gigante) is a 2009 comedy-drama film written and directed by Adrían Biniez, an Argentinian film director living in Uruguay.

== Synopsis ==
Jara (Horacio Camandule) is a security guard at a supermarket who falls in love with Julia (Leonor Svarcas), a cleaning worker on the night shift. Jara is about 30 years old, solitary, quiet and big. That is why before approaching Julia, he watches her via the television cameras monitoring the supermarket, and then pursues her across the city of Montevideo, where the film is set.

== Cast ==
- Horacio Camandule as Jara
- Leonor Svarcas as Julia
- Diego Artucio as Omar
- Ariel Caldarelli as Jara's boss
- Fabiana Charlo as Mariela
- Andrés Gallo as Fidel
- Federico García as Matías
- Néstor Guzzini as Tomás
- Esteban Lago as Gustavo
- Ernesto Liotti as Danilo
- Carlos Lissardy as Kennedy

== Awards and nominations ==
=== Film Awards ===
Year	Film Festival	Award	Category
2009	Berlin Film Festival	Jury Grand Prix	Best Film
2009	Berlin Film Festival	Alfred Bauer Award	Best Debut Film
2009	Berlin Film Festival	Gold Hugo	New Directors Competition
2009	Havana Film Festival	Grand Coral	First Work
2009	Lima Film Festival	Special Jury Prize	Best Film
2009	San Sebastián International Film Festival	Horizons Award	Best Film
2010	AFM International Independent Film Festival	!f Inspired Award	

=== Submissions ===
- Berlin Film Festival
  - Golden Bear (nominated)
- Goya Awards
  - Best Spanish Language Foreign Film (nominated)

== See also ==
- List of films featuring surveillance
