= Peter Rühring =

German actor (1942–2025)

Peter Rühring (10 July 1942 – 9 April 2025) was a German actor.

== Life and career ==
Rühring was born in Bremerhaven, Germany on 10 July 1942. He completed his training at the Schauspielschule Bochum. In the course of his career, he held several permanent engagements as a theater actor, including at the Mannheim National Theatre (1972–1988), the Staatstheater Stuttgart (1988–1996), and at the Residence Theatre (1996–2001).

Rühring died on 9 April 2025, at the age of 82.
