= Thomas Wander =

Austrian composer (born 1973)

- Born: April 19, 1973 (age 53); Graz, Austria
- Other name: Thomas Wanker
- Occupations: Film composer, music producer
- Years active: 1991–present
- Website: www.thomaswander.com

Thomas Wander (born 19 April 1973) also credited as Thomas Wanker, is an Austrian-born composer for film and television. While his original plans were to play piano in a jazz band, as a teenager he took notice of the emotional response he had to the scores for E.T. the Extraterrestrial and Once Upon a Time in America and grew an interest in film music. In 1992, he moved to Los Angeles to study film composition at the University of Southern California. He has won the BMI Film Music Award in 2008 for his score in 10,000 BC, in 2010 for his score in the film 2012, and in 2014 for the score to White House Down. Wander frequently collaborates with fellow composer Harald Kloser on many of his projects, and is best known for his work on the films of director Roland Emmerich.

== Filmography ==
- The Venice Project (1999)
- After the Truth (1999)
- Marlene (2000)
- Ali: An American Hero (2000)
- Buffy the Vampire Slayer (TV series, 2000–2002)
- The Tunnel (2001)
- The Crusaders (2001)
- Dracula (2002)
- Sins of the Father (2002)
- RFK (2002)
- Dresden (2006)
- 10,000 BC (2008)
- Giant (2009)
- 2012 (2009)
- Anonymous (2011)
- All Things to All Men (2013)
- White House Down (2013)
- Independence Day: Resurgence (2016)
- Midway (2019)
- Moonfall (2022)
