= Harald Kloser =

Austrian film composer and producer

- Born: 9 July 1956 (age 69); Hard, Vorarlberg, Austria
- Occupations: Film composer, producer and writer
- Years active: 1988-present
- Spouse: Désirée Nosbusch (m. 1991; div. 2002) Ana Maria Lombo
- Children: 3

Harald Kloser (born 9 July 1956) is an Austrian film composer, producer, and screenwriter. Since his critical and commercial breakthrough in 2005, in which he won the BMI Film Music Award for both of his scores for Alien vs. Predator and The Day After Tomorrow, he has become a regular collaborator of the latter's director, Roland Emmerich, having composed music for every one of the director's films since 2004, excluding Stonewall (2015). Out of those films, all but Anonymous (2011) have been collaborations with fellow composer Thomas Wander.

Besides composing original scores, Kloser has also produced and co-written several films with Emmerich, starting with 10,000 BC (2008), which Emmerich invited Kloser to write after liking the story changes Kloser proposed to The Day After Tomorrow.

Kloser was married to Désirée Nosbusch, and the couple's children Lennon and Luka are also musicians. He has since entered into a relationship with Ana Maria Lombo, best known as part of girl group Eden's Crush.

== Filmography ==
=== Film ===
Year	Title	Composer	Producer	Writer	Notes
1992	The Magic Voyage	Yes	No	No	
1993	Fatal Deception: Mrs. Lee Harvey Oswald	Yes	No	No	TV movie
1995	The O. J. Simpson Story	Yes	No	No	TV movie
1996	Magenta	Yes	No	No	
1997	Quiet Days in Hollywood	Yes	No	No	
1997	Comedian Harmonists	Yes	No	No	
1999	The Thirteenth Floor	Yes	No	No	
1999	The Venice Project	Yes	No	No	
1999	After the Truth	Yes	No	No	
2000	Marlene	Yes	No	No	
2000	Deliberate Intent	Yes	No	No	
2000	Ali: An American Hero	Yes	No	No	
2000	A Handful of Grass	Yes	No	No	
2001	The Tunnel	Yes	No	No	
2001	Hostile Takeover	Yes	No	No	
2001	The Crusaders	Yes	No	No	TV movie
2002	Sins of the Father	Yes	No	No	TV movie
2002	RFK	Yes	No	No	TV movie
2003	Rudy: The Rudy Giuliani Story	Yes	No	No	TV movie
2004	The Day After Tomorrow	Yes	No	No	
2004	Alien vs. Predator	Yes	No	No	
2006	Dresden	Yes	No	No	TV movie
2006	Sturmflut	Yes	No	No	
2008	10,000 B.C.	Yes	Executive	Yes	
2009	Giant	Yes	No	No	
2009	2012	Yes	Yes	Yes	
2011	Anonymous	Yes	No	No	
2013	White House Down	Yes	Yes	No	
2016	Independence Day: Resurgence	Yes	Yes	No	
2018	Discarnate	Yes	Yes	No	
2019	Midway	Yes	Yes	No	
2022	Moonfall	Yes	Yes	Yes	

=== Television ===
Year	Title	Composer	Producer	Notes
2002	Dracula	Yes	No	Miniseries
2024	Those About to Die	No	Executive	10 episodes
