= 10,000 BC (film) =

2008 film by Roland Emmerich

- Theatrical release poster
- Directed by: Roland Emmerich
- Written by: Roland Emmerich; Harald Kloser
- Produced by: Michael Wimer; Roland Emmerich; Mark Gordon
- Starring: Steven Strait; Camilla Belle; Cliff Curtis
- Cinematography: Ueli Steiger
- Edited by: Alexander Berner
- Music by: Harald Kloser; Thomas Wander
- Production companies: Legendary Pictures; Centropolis Entertainment
- Distributed by: Warner Bros. Pictures
- Release dates: February 10, 2008 (Potsdamer Platz); March 7, 2008 (United States)
- Running time: 109 minutes
- Country: United States
- Language: English
- Budget: $105 million
- Box office: $269.8 million

10,000 BC is a 2008 American action-adventure film, directed by Roland Emmerich, and written by Emmerich and Harald Kloser. The cast includes Steven Strait, Camilla Belle, and Cliff Curtis. The film depicts the journeys of a prehistoric tribe of mammoth hunters.

10,000 BC premiered at Potsdamer Platz on February 10, 2008, and was released by Warner Bros. Pictures on March 7. It received negative reviews from critics and grossed $270 million against a $105 million budget.

== Plot ==
In 10,000 BC, a hunter-gatherer tribe called the Yagahl lives in the Ural Mountains. They survive by hunting woolly mammoths, but as the migrations grow scarcer, uncertainty about their future mounts. When a young blue-eyed orphaned girl is brought to their camp, the Yagahl's shaman, Old Mother, prophesies that "four-legged demons" will come for them after their last mammoth hunt. The tribe's most beautiful girl, Evolet, will be betrothed to the hunt's champion, and the pair will lead the Yagahl into a new way of life. Unwilling to trust this prophecy, the tribe's chief hunter and bearer of the White Spear sets out on his own to find another way to save his people. He entrusts his friend Tic'Tic with the White Spear and his young son D'Leh. D'Leh falls in love with Evolet and promises to keep her in his heart forever.

Years later, when the mammoths finally return, adult D'Leh hunts them with his tribe's men under Tic'Tic's leadership and accidentally kills one, inadvertently winning the White Spear and Evolet. The next day, horse-mounted riders attack the camp. Without encountering any significant resistance, they slaughter several villagers and abduct Evolet and other tribe members. Tic'Tic, D'Leh, his rival Ka'Ren, and a young boy, Baku, set out to rescue their fellow Yagahl as Old Mother follows their journey in spirit. During a terror bird attack, the slavers capture Ka'Ren and Baku. D'Leh and Tic'Tic follow the caravan and reach a Naku village that the riders also attacked. Thanks to a saber-tooth tiger D'Leh previously rescued, which recognizes him and does not attack, the initially hostile Naku welcome D'Leh, seeing him as their prophesied savior. They also learn that D'Leh's father was a Naku guest before the riders captured him.

Several tribes arrive and form a coalition to defeat the slavers, with D'Leh leading them. They find the ships holding Evolet and their loved ones but fail to reach them before they cast off. They set out on foot, and D'Leh learns to use the North Star to navigate. D'Leh and the tribes discover an advanced desert civilization ruled by the "Almighty", a supposedly invincible god-king who uses kidnapped tribesmen and some mammoths to build pyramids. D'Leh and Tic'Tic sneak into the slave cages, and D'Leh learns that his father was killed trying to defend a slave. The party is spotted by some guards, whom Tic'Tic kills, but not before he is fatally wounded. D'Leh and the tribesmen infiltrate the civilization and start a rebellion among the slaves, killing many of the Almighty's forces. However, Ka'Ren sacrifices himself as D'Leh eventually starts a mammoth stampede.

The Almighty threatens to kill Evolet if they do not abandon their rebellion. D'Leh feigns acceptance but kills the Almighty with the White Spear, breaking his illusion of godhood. During the ensuing battle, Evolet is fatally wounded. D'Leh is devastated when Evolet dies in his arms, but her life is restored in exchange for Old Mother's, who dies having fulfilled her final duty. With the Almighty dead and his civilization destroyed, the Yagahl bid the other tribes farewell and returned home with seeds D'Leh's father collected, which the Naku gave them to begin a new life based on farming.

=== Alternate ending ===
In an alternative ending, the scene shifts forward many years, showing Baku retelling the story to other tribesmen by the campfire. It ends with a child asking what had happened to the "Mountains of the Gods," and Baku responds, "They were taken back by the sands. Lost to time, and lost to man."

== Cast ==
- Steven Strait as D'Leh, a manak hunter
- Camilla Belle as Evolet, D'Leh's wife and the only survivor of a tribe which was destroyed by the "four-legged demons" (fierce warriors on horseback) – spared because of her unique blue eyes
- Cliff Curtis as Tic'Tic, D'Leh's mentor and friend
- Joel Virgel as Nakudu, leader of the Naku tribe
- Affif Ben Badra as Warlord, the leader of the "Four Legged Demons"
- Mo Zinal as Ka'Ren
- Nathanael Baring as Baku
- Marco Khan as One-Eye, Warlord's main henchman
- Mona Hammond as Old Mother, the Neanderthal shaman of the Yahgdal
- Joel Fry as Lu'Kibu
- Reece Ritchie as Moha
- Piers Stubbs as Young Moha
- Junior Oliphant as Tudu, Nakudu's son
- Kristian Beazley as D'Leh's father, who had lived with the Naku tribe and learned agriculture from them
- Boubacar Babiane as Quina, leader of another tribe
- Farouk Valley-Omar as the High Priest
- Tim Barlow as The Almighty, last of three kings and the last of the Atlanteans
- Omar Sharif as Narrator

== Historical accuracy ==
The film incorporates numerous anachronisms and inaccuracies in its depiction of prehistoric life. While woolly mammoths and saber-toothed tigers may have existed as late as 10,000 B.C., both species were on the brink of extinction around this time, likely due to a combination of human hunting, disease, and climate change. The film's portrayal of mammoth behavior, suggesting that herds were led by a male leader, is inconsistent with evidence from modern elephant behavior, which indicates that herds are typically led by older females, with males expelled at puberty.

The inclusion of advanced civilizations, pyramid-like monuments, written language, and metal tools in the narrative is highly inaccurate. Such developments did not emerge until approximately 3,000 B.C., during the urbanization of regions such as the Nile, Euphrates, and Indus river valleys. Early evidence of agriculture dates back to around 9,400 B.C., but organized farming and the use of tools like hoes would not have been widespread at the time depicted in the film. Additionally, while some early stone monuments, such as Göbekli Tepe, date to roughly 9,000 B.C., the advanced technology shown in the film, including metal tools and the sextant, is misplaced by several millennia.

== Production ==
=== Casting ===
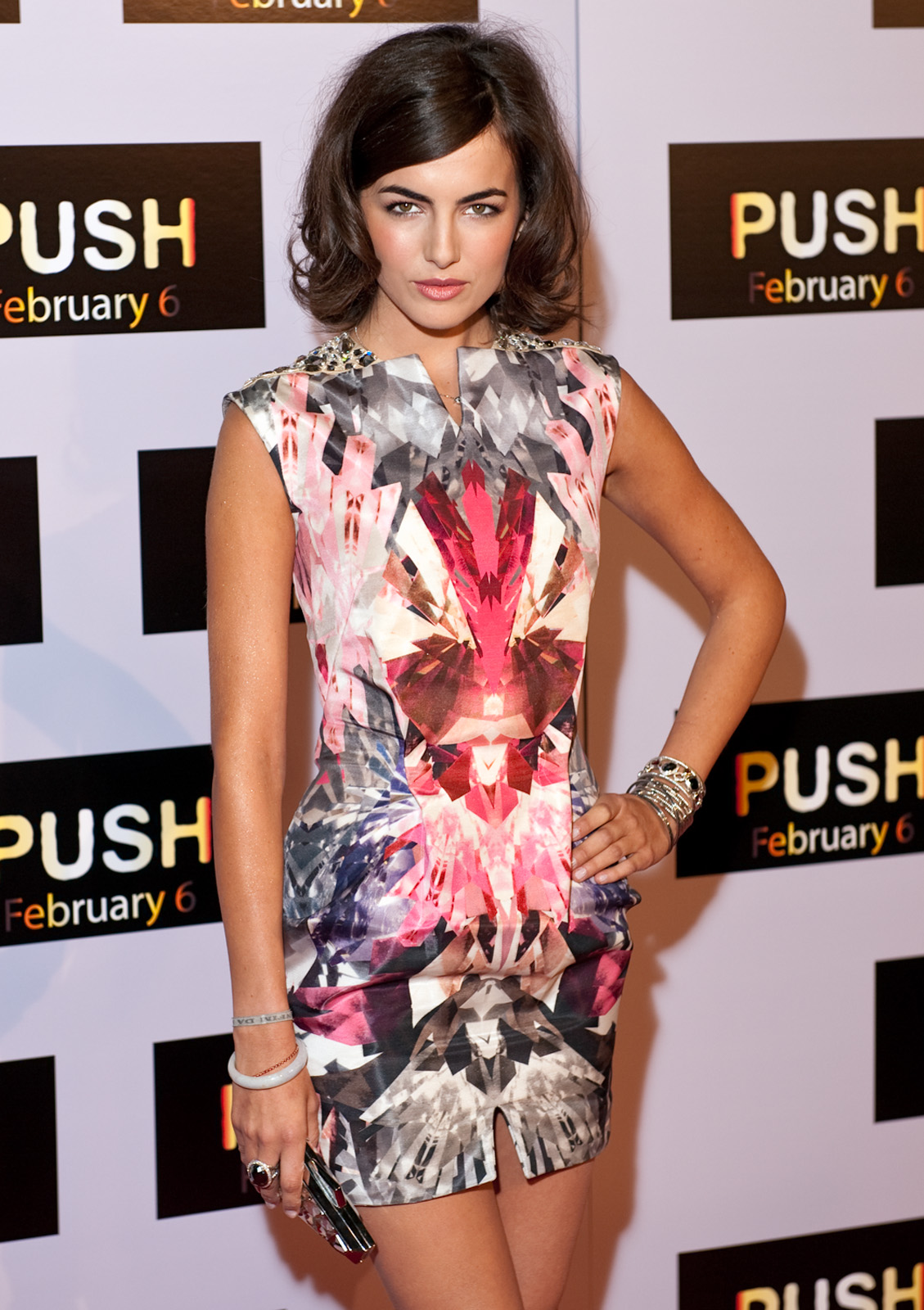
Camilla Belle Routh portrayed Evolet in 10,000 BC

Roland Emmerich opened casting sessions in late October 2005. In February 2006, Camilla Belle and Steven Strait were announced to star in the film, with Strait as the mammoth hunter and Belle as his love interest. Emmerich decided that casting well known actors would distract from the realistic feel of the prehistoric setting. "If like, Jake Gyllenhaal turned up in a movie like this, everybody would be, 'What's that?'", he explained. The casting of unknown actors also helped keep the film's budget down.

=== Development ===
At the 2008 Wondercon, Emmerich mentioned the fiction of Robert E. Howard as a primary influence for the film's setting, as well as his love for the film Quest for Fire (1981) and the book Fingerprints of the Gods. He invited composer Harald Kloser to help write the screenplay after he liked his story suggestions to The Day After Tomorrow. When the project received the greenlight from Columbia Pictures, screenwriter John Orloff began work on a new draft of the original script. Columbia Pictures, under Sony Pictures Entertainment, dropped the project due to a busy release calendar, and Warner Bros. Pictures picked up the project in Sony's absence. The script went through a second revision with Matthew Sand and a final revision with Robert Rodat.

Production began in early 2006 in South Africa and Namibia. Location filming also took place in southern New Zealand and Thailand. Emmerich wanted to shoot the entire film in Africa but was barred from shooting a certain helicopter scene which led to them going to New Zealand for those shots. Before shooting began, the production had spent eighteen months on research and development for the computer-generated imagery. Two companies recreated prehistoric animals. To cut time (it was taking sixteen hours to render a single frame) 50% of the CGI models' fur was removed, as "it turned out half the fur looked the same" to the director. Filming took place for a total of 102 days, 20 days longer than planned.

=== Language ===
Emmerich rejected making the film in an ancient language, deciding that it would not be as emotionally engaging. Dialect coach Brendan Gunn was hired by Emmerich and Kloser to create "a half dozen" languages for the film. Gunn has stated that he collaborated informally with Strait to improvise what the languages would sound like. He also used some local African languages and their dialects, including the Oshiwambo language native to Namibia, which can be heard faintly, spoken by the wise blind man.

=== Visual and sound effects ===
The woolly mammoths in the movie were based on elephants and fossils of mammoths, while the saber-toothed cat was based on tigers and ligers (a lion/tiger hybrid). The sounds made by the saber-toothed cat in the movie are based on the vocalization of tigers and lions.

== Release ==
The film's world premiere was held on February 10, 2008, at Sony Center on Potsdamer Platz in Berlin.

== Reception ==
=== Box office ===
The film was a moderate success at the box office. In its opening weekend, the film grossed $35.8 million in 3,410 theaters in the United States and Canada, ranking No. 1 at the box office, and grossing over $22 million more than the film in second place, College Road Trip. The film grossed approximately $268.6 million worldwide—$94.6 million in the United States and Canada and $174 million in other territories—including $17.2 million in Mexico, $13.1 million in Spain, $11.3 million in the United Kingdom, and $10.8 million in China. This also makes it the first film of 2008 to surpass the $200 million mark.

=== Critical response ===
On the review aggregator website Rotten Tomatoes, 10% of 147 critics' reviews are positive, with an average rating of 3.4/10. The website's consensus reads: "With attention strictly paid to style instead of substance, or historical accuracy, 10,000 B.C. is a visually impressive but narratively flimsy epic." Metacritic, which uses a weighted average, assigned the film a score of 34 out of 100, based on 29 critics, indicating "generally unfavorable" reviews. Audiences polled by CinemaScore gave the film an average grade of "C" on an A+ to F scale.

Todd McCarthy of Variety wrote: "Conventional where it should be bold and mild where it should be wild, 10,000 BC reps a missed opportunity to present an imaginative vision of a prehistoric moment." Peter Bradshaw of The Guardian wrote: "Roland Emmerich's great big CGI blockbuster lumbers along like one of the woolly mammoths that roam across the screen." Caroline White, writing for The Times, noted that 10,000 BC is archaeologically inaccurate and contains many factual errors and anachronisms.

Ann Hornaday of The Washington Post described the film as "one part Joseph Campbell hero quest, one part multi-culti morality tale, one part live-action Flintstones cartoon, 10,000 B.C. is finally every part just plain nuts." Michael Phillips of the Chicago Tribune was one of the few critics who enjoyed the film. He said, "The film's a little bit of Apocalypto, mixed in with Ice Age 2, a dash of Quest for Fire, and sometimes, you're just in the mood for a big old piece of cheese. Folks, here is that cheese on a cracker."

Composer Thomas Wander won a BMI Film Music Award for his work on the film.

== Home media ==
The film was released on June 17, 2008, in single-disc editions on DVD and Blu-ray Disc in the United States. Best Buy released a 2-disc limited edition along with the DVD and Blu-ray Disc releases. It was released on July 1, 2008, in the United Kingdom. The film grossed $31,341,721 in DVD sales, bringing its total film gross to $300,414,491.

== See also ==
- List of American films of 2008
- One Million Years B.C. – A similar film released in 1966
- Quest for Fire – A similar film released in 1981
