= List of awards and nominations received by Wes Anderson =

Wes Anderson awards and nominations
Awards and nominations
Award	Wins	Nominations
Academy Awards	1	8
BAFTA Awards	1	7
Golden Globe Awards	0	4
Critics' Choice Awards	0	4
Independent Spirit Awards	1	5

Totals (Note: Certain award groups do not simply award one winner. They acknowledge several different recipients, have runners-up, and have third place. Since this is a specific recognition and is different from losing an award, runner-up mentions are considered wins in this award tally. For simplification and to avoid errors, each award in this list has been presumed to have had a prior nomination.)
- Wins: 3
- Nominations: 22

Wes Anderson is an American filmmaker. Known for directing eccentric comedy films he has received various accolades including an Academy Award, a BAFTA Award, and an Independent Spirit Award as well as nominations for four Golden Globe Awards and four Critics' Choice Awards. His films have competed at the Berlin International Film Festival, the Cannes Film Festival, and the Venice International Film Festival.

Anderson made his directorial debut with the crime comedy Bottle Rocket (1996) for which he won the MTV Movie Award for Best New Filmmaker. He then directed the coming-of-age comedy Rushmore (1998) earning the Independent Spirit Award for Best Director. He gained mainstream success with the family dramedy The Royal Tenenbaums (2001), which earned him nominations for the Academy Award for Best Original Screenplay (his first Oscar nomination) and the BAFTA Award for Best Original Screenplay. He directed the adventure comedy-drama The Life Aquatic with Steve Zissou (2004), which competed for the Berlin International Film Festival's Golden Bear. His next film, the comedy The Darjeeling Limited (2007) competed for the Golden Lion at the Venice International Film Festival. Anderson directed his first stop-motion animated film Fantastic Mr. Fox for which he was nominated for the Academy Award, BAFTA Award, and Golden Globe Award for Best Animated Feature.

He directed the period teen romance Moonrise Kingdom (2012) which competed for the Palme d'Or and earned him nominations for the Academy Award, BAFTA Award, Critics' Choice Award, and Independent Spirit Award for Best Original Screenplay. He gained critical attention for his crime caper adventure comedy The Grand Budapest Hotel (2014), earning nominations for three Academy Award (Picture, Director, and Screenplay) as well as winning for the BAFTA Award for Best Original Screenplay. He then directed his second stop-motion film Isle of Dogs (2018) which earned him the Silver Bear for Best Director at the Berlin International Film Festival as well as nominations for the Academy Award, BAFTA Award and Golden Globe Award for Best Animated Feature.

With his anthology comedy film The French Dispatch of the Liberty, Kansas Evening Sun (2021), it competed for the Palme d'Or at the Cannes Film Festival and was nominated for the Writers Guild of America Award for Best Original Screenplay. After seven Academy Award nominations, he finally won for the Academy Award for Best Live Action Short Film for the Netflix short film The Wonderful Story of Henry Sugar (2023) which was adapted off the Roald Dahl story of the same name. The anthology film also consisted of three other shorts, "The Swan", "The Rat Catcher", and "Poison", also based on other Dahl stories. His next two films, the existentialist science-fiction dramedy Asteroid City (2023) and the espionage crime comedy The Phoenician Scheme (2025), both competed for the Palme d'Or at the Cannes Film Festival.

== Major Awards ==
=== Academy Awards ===
Year	Category	Nominated work	Result	Ref.
2002	Best Original Screenplay	The Royal Tenenbaums	Nominated	
2010	Best Animated Feature	Fantastic Mr. Fox	Nominated	
2013	Best Original Screenplay	Moonrise Kingdom	Nominated	
2015	Best Picture	The Grand Budapest Hotel	Nominated	
2015	Best Director	The Grand Budapest Hotel	Nominated	
2015	Best Original Screenplay	The Grand Budapest Hotel	Nominated	
2019	Best Animated Feature	Isle of Dogs	Nominated	
2024	Best Live Action Short	The Wonderful Story of Henry Sugar	Won	

=== BAFTA Awards ===
Year	Category	Nominated work	Result	Ref.
2002	Best Original Screenplay	The Royal Tenenbaums	Nominated	
2010	Best Animated Film	Fantastic Mr. Fox	Nominated	
2013	Best Original Screenplay	Moonrise Kingdom	Nominated	
2015	Best Film	The Grand Budapest Hotel	Nominated	
2015	Best Direction	The Grand Budapest Hotel	Nominated	
2015	Best Original Screenplay	The Grand Budapest Hotel	Won	
2019	Best Animated Film	Isle of Dogs	Nominated	

=== Critics' Choice Awards ===
Year	Category	Nominated work	Result	Ref.
2009	Best Adapted Screenplay	Fantastic Mr. Fox	Nominated	
2012	Best Original Screenplay	Moonrise Kingdom	Nominated	
2014	Best Director	The Grand Budapest Hotel	Nominated	
2014	Best Original Screenplay	The Grand Budapest Hotel	Nominated	

=== Golden Globe Awards ===
Year	Category	Nominated work	Result	Ref.
2010	Best Animated Feature	Fantastic Mr. Fox	Nominated	
2015	Best Director	The Grand Budapest Hotel	Nominated	
2015	Best Screenplay	The Grand Budapest Hotel	Nominated	
2019	Best Animated Feature Film	Isle of Dogs	Nominated	

== Miscellaneous Awards ==
Organizations	Year	Category	Work	Result	Ref.
Alliance of Women Film Journalists	2014	Best Director	The Grand Budapest Hotel	Nominated	
Alliance of Women Film Journalists	2014	Best Original Screenplay	The Grand Budapest Hotel	Nominated	
Annie Award	2010	Best Writing in a Feature Production	Fantastic Mr. Fox	Won	
Annie Award	2010	Directing in a Feature Production	Fantastic Mr. Fox	Nominated	
Berlin International Film Festival	2002	Golden Bear	The Royal Tenenbaums	Nominated	
Berlin International Film Festival	2005	Golden Bear	The Life Aquatic with Steve Zissou	Nominated	
Berlin International Film Festival	2014	Golden Bear	The Grand Budapest Hotel	Nominated	
Berlin International Film Festival	2014	Silver Bear Grand Jury Prize	The Grand Budapest Hotel	Won	
Berlin International Film Festival	2018	Golden Bear	Isle of Dogs	Nominated	
Berlin International Film Festival	2018	Silver Bear for Best Director	Isle of Dogs	Won	
Bodil Award	2003	Best American Film	The Royal Tenenbaums	Nominated	
Bodil Award	2008	Best American Film	The Darjeeling Limited	Nominated	
Cannes Film Festival	2012	Palme d'Or	Moonrise Kingdom	Nominated	
Cannes Film Festival	2021	Palme d'Or	The French Dispatch	Nominated	
Cannes Film Festival	2023	Palme d'Or	Asteroid City	Nominated	
Cannes Film Festival	2025	Palme d'Or	The Phoenician Scheme	Nominated	
David di Donatello	2014	Best Foreign Film	The Grand Budapest Hotel	Won	
Directors Guild of America	2014	Outstanding Directing – Feature Film	The Grand Budapest Hotel	Nominated	
DVD Premiere Award	2003	Best Audio Commentary	The Royal Tenenbaums	Nominated	
Gijón International Film Festival	2007	Best Feature	The Darjeeling Limited	Nominated	
Imagine Film Festival	2018	Silver Scream Award	Isle of Dogs	Won	
Independent Spirit Awards	1999	Best Director	Rushmore	Won	
Independent Spirit Awards	2006	Best Feature	The Squid and the Whale	Nominated	
Independent Spirit Awards	2013	Best Feature	Moonrise Kingdom	Nominated	
Independent Spirit Awards	2013	Best Director	Moonrise Kingdom	Nominated	
Independent Spirit Awards	2013	Best Screenplay	Moonrise Kingdom	Nominated	
Lone Star Film and Television Award	1996	Debut of the Year	Bottle Rocket	Won	
Lone Star Film and Television Award	1999	Best Director	Rushmore	Won	
Lone Star Film and Television Award	1999	Best Writer	Rushmore	Won	
MTV Movie Award	1996	Best New Filmmaker	Bottle Rocket	Won	
Producers Guild of America	2009	Best Animated Feature Film	Fantastic Mr. Fox	Nominated	
Producers Guild of America	2012	Outstanding Producer - Motion Picture	Moonrise Kingdom	Nominated	
Producers Guild of America	2014	Outstanding Producer - Motion Picture	The Grand Budapest Hotel	Nominated	
Satellite Award	2005	Best Screenplay	The Life Aquatic with Steve Zissou	Nominated	
SXSW Film Festival	2017	Audience Award - Headliners	Isle of Dogs	Won	
Venice International Film Festival	2007	Golden Lion	The Darjeeling Limited	Nominated	
Venice International Film Festival	2007	Little Golden Lion	The Darjeeling Limited	Won	
Writers Guild of America Awards	2001	Best Screenplay	The Royal Tenenbaums	Nominated	
Writers Guild of America Awards	2012	Best Original Screenplay	Moonrise Kingdom	Nominated	
Writers Guild of America Awards	2014	Best Original Screenplay	The Grand Budapest Hotel	Won	
Writers Guild of America Awards	2021	Best Original Screenplay	The French Dispatch	Nominated	

== Critics awards ==
Year	Association	Category	Film	Result	Ref.
2009	Central Ohio Film Critics Association	Best Screenplay	Fantastic Mr. Fox	Nominated	
2012	Central Ohio Film Critics Association	Best Director	Moonrise Kingdom	Won	
2012	Central Ohio Film Critics Association	Best Original Screenplay	Moonrise Kingdom	Won	
2014	Central Ohio Film Critics Association	Best Director	The Grand Budapest Hotel	Runner-up	
2014	Central Ohio Film Critics Association	Best Original Screenplay	The Grand Budapest Hotel	Runner-up	
2002	Chicago Film Critics Association Award	Best Screenplay	The Royal Tenenbaums	Nominated	
2012	Chicago Film Critics Association Award	Best Screenplay	Moonrise Kingdom	Nominated	
2014	Chicago Film Critics Association Award	Best Director	The Grand Budapest Hotel	Nominated	
2014	Chicago Film Critics Association Award	Best Original Screenplay	The Grand Budapest Hotel	Won	
2012	Dallas-Fort Worth Film Critics Association	Best Director	Moonrise Kingdom	Nominated	
2014	Dallas-Fort Worth Film Critics Association	Best Director	The Grand Budapest Hotel	Nominated	
2014	Denver Film Critics Society	Best Original Screenplay	The Grand Budapest Hotel	Nominated	
2014	Detroit Film Critics Society	Best Director	The Grand Budapest Hotel	Nominated	
2014	Detroit Film Critics Society	Best Screenplay	The Grand Budapest Hotel	Nominated	
2014	Dublin Film Critics' Circle	Best Director	The Grand Budapest Hotel	Nominated	
2014	Florida Film Critics Circle	Best Director	The Grand Budapest Hotel	Nominated	
2014	Florida Film Critics Circle	Best Original Screenplay	The Grand Budapest Hotel	Won	
2014	Georgia Film Critics Association	Best Director	The Grand Budapest Hotel	Nominated	
2014	Georgia Film Critics Association	Best Original Screenplay	The Grand Budapest Hotel	Nominated	
2014	Houston Film Critics Society	Best Director	The Grand Budapest Hotel	Nominated	
2014	Houston Film Critics Society	Best Original Screenplay	The Grand Budapest Hotel	Nominated	
2014	London Film Critics' Awards	Director of the Year	The Grand Budapest Hotel	Nominated	
2014	London Film Critics' Awards	Screenwriter of the Year	The Grand Budapest Hotel	Won	
1998	Los Angeles Film Critics Association	New Generation Award	Rushmore	Won	
2009	Los Angeles Film Critics Association	Best Animation	Fantastic Mr. Fox	Won	
2014	Los Angeles Film Critics Association	Best Director	The Grand Budapest Hotel	Runner-up	
2014	Los Angeles Film Critics Association	Best Screenplay	The Grand Budapest Hotel	Won	
2010	National Board of Review	Special Achievement Award	Fantastic Mr. Fox	Won	
1999	National Society of Film Critics	Best Screenplay	Rushmore	Won	
2009	National Society of Film Critics	Special Achievement Award	Fantastic Mr. Fox	Won	
2014	National Society of Film Critics	Best Screenplay	The Grand Budapest Hotel	Won	
1998	New York Film Critics Circle	Best Screenplay	Rushmore	Nominated	
2001	New York Film Critics Circle	Best Screenplay	The Royal Tenenbaums	Nominated	
2009	New York Film Critics Circle	Best Director	Fantastic Mr. Fox	Nominated	
2012	New York Film Critics Circle	Best Screenplay	Moonrise Kingdom	Nominated	
2014	New York Film Critics Circle	Best Screenplay	The Grand Budapest Hotel	Won	
2014	Oklahoma Film Critics Circle	Best Original Screenplay	The Grand Budapest Hotel	Won	
2002	Online Film Critics Society	Best Screenplay	The Royal Tenenbaums	Nominated	
2010	Online Film Critics Society	Best Screenplay	Fantastic Mr. Fox	Won	
2014	Online Film Critics Society	Best Director	The Grand Budapest Hotel	Nominated	
2014	Online Film Critics Society	Best Screenplay	The Grand Budapest Hotel	Won	
2002	Phoenix Film Critics Society	Best Screenplay	The Royal Tenenbaums	Nominated	
2014	Phoenix Film Critics Society	Best Director	The Grand Budapest Hotel	Nominated	
2014	Phoenix Film Critics Society	Best Original Screenplay	The Grand Budapest Hotel	Won	
2009	San Diego Film Critics Society	Best Screenplay	Fantastic Mr. Fox	Won	
2012	San Diego Film Critics Society	Best Screenplay	Moonrise Kingdom	Nominated	
2014	San Diego Film Critics Society	Best Director	The Grand Budapest Hotel	Nominated	
2014	San Diego Film Critics Society	Best Original Screenplay	The Grand Budapest Hotel	Nominated	
2018	San Diego Film Critics Society	Best Original Screenplay	Isle of Dogs	Nominated	
2009	San Francisco Film Critics Circle	Best Screenplay	Fantastic Mr. Fox	Won	
2014	San Francisco Film Critics Circle	Best Director	The Grand Budapest Hotel	Won	
2014	San Francisco Film Critics Circle	Best Original Screenplay	The Grand Budapest Hotel	Nominated	
2009	Southeastern Film Critics Association	Best Screenplay	Fantastic Mr. Fox	Won	
2014	Southeastern Film Critics Association	Best Director	The Grand Budapest Hotel	2nd Place	
2014	Southeastern Film Critics Association	Best Original Screenplay	The Grand Budapest Hotel	Won	
2014	St. Louis Gateway Film Critics Association	Best Director	The Grand Budapest Hotel	Nominated	
2002	Toronto Film Critics Association	Best Screenplay	The Royal Tenenbaums	Nominated	
2014	Toronto Film Critics Association	Best Director	The Grand Budapest Hotel	Nominated	
2014	Toronto Film Critics Association	Best Screenplay	The Grand Budapest Hotel	Won	
2014	Vancouver Film Critics Circle	Best Director	The Grand Budapest Hotel	Nominated	
2014	Vancouver Film Critics Circle	Best Screenplay	The Grand Budapest Hotel	Won	
2014	Washington D.C. Film Critics Association	Best Original Screenplay	The Grand Budapest Hotel	Nominated	

== Reception ==
Year	Title	Rotten Tomatoes	Metacritic
1996	Bottle Rocket	85% (72 reviews)	67% (24 reviews)
1998	Rushmore	90% (107 reviews)	86% (33 reviews)
2001	The Royal Tenenbaums	81% (216 reviews)	76% (34 reviews)
2004	The Life Aquatic with Steve Zissou	57% (224 reviews)	62% (38 reviews)
2007	The Darjeeling Limited	69% (192 reviews)	67% (35 reviews)
2009	Fantastic Mr. Fox	93% (245 reviews)	83% (34 reviews)
2012	Moonrise Kingdom	93% (268 reviews)	84% (43 reviews)
2014	The Grand Budapest Hotel	92% (315 reviews)	88% (48 reviews)
2018	Isle of Dogs	90% (367 reviews)	82% (55 reviews)
2021	The French Dispatch	75% (319 reviews)	74% (57 reviews)
2023	Asteroid City	76% (360 reviews)	73% (60 reviews)
2025	The Phoenician Scheme	78% (131 reviews)	71% (41 reviews)
