= Eric Chase Anderson =

American author, illustrator and actor

- Born: Houston, Texas, U.S.
- Education: Stratford High School
- Occupations: Author; illustrator; actor
- Years active: 1998–present
- Relatives: Wes Anderson (brother)

Eric Chase Anderson is an American author, illustrator and actor.

== Early life ==
Anderson was born in Houston, Texas, and attended Stratford High School. He is the younger brother of filmmaker Wes Anderson.

== Work ==
Anderson's first book for young readers, Chuck Dugan Is AWOL: A Novel, With Maps, was published in 2005 by Chronicle Books. His illustrations have also appeared in Time magazine and The New York Observer and as part of a marketing campaign for Virgin Mobile. He illustrated all of the maps, covers, and other packaging of the Criterion Collection editions of the films Rushmore, The Royal Tenenbaums, The Life Aquatic with Steve Zissou, and The Darjeeling Limited.

Anderson also helped conceptualize the design for The Royal Tenenbaums by making detailed maps of each room in the Tenenbaum house for the production designers to use as guides, in addition to creating all of the drawings and paintings credited to Richie Tenenbaum.

In 2005, he published an opinion piece in The New York Times concerning the Randy "Duke" Cunningham affair.

== Filmography ==
Year	Film	Role	Notes
1998	Rushmore	Architect	Cameo
2001	The Royal Tenenbaums	Medical Student	Cameo
2004	The Life Aquatic with Steve Zissou	Air Kentucky Pilot	Cameo
2009	Fantastic Mr. Fox	Kristofferson Silverfox	Voice role
2012	Moonrise Kingdom	Secretary McIntire	Cameo
