= Sara Tanaka =

American actress

- Born: November 21, 1978 (age 47); Huntington, New York
- Occupations: Physician, former actress
- Years active: 1996–2004

Sara Tanaka (born November 21, 1978) is an American physician and former film actress. She is best known for her roles in Rushmore, Old School, and Race the Sun.

== Biography ==
Tanaka was born in Huntington, New York.

Her brother, Alessandro Tanaka, is a screenwriter and actor.

She graduated from Brown University in 2000 with a degree in human biology. In 2008, she completed her M.D. degree when she graduated from the Pritzker School of Medicine at the University of Chicago.

She completed her internal medicine residency program at the University of Chicago and then her cardiology fellowship program at the Beth Israel Deaconess Medical Center in 2015.

== Filmography ==
=== Film ===
Year	Film	Role	Notes
1996	Race the Sun	Uni Kakamura	
1998	Rushmore	Margaret Yang	
2002	Slackers	Student	Uncredited
2003	Old School	Megan Huang	
2003	Cigarette	Sara	Short film
2004	Imaginary Heroes	Shelly Chan	

=== Television ===
Year	Series	Role	Notes
2001	Gideon's Crossing	Linda Kim	"A Routine Case" (Season 1, Episode 3, 2001-06-10)

=== Video games ===
Year	Series	Role
2004	Grand Theft Auto: San Andreas	Pedestrian
