= Wes Anderson =

American filmmaker (born 1969)

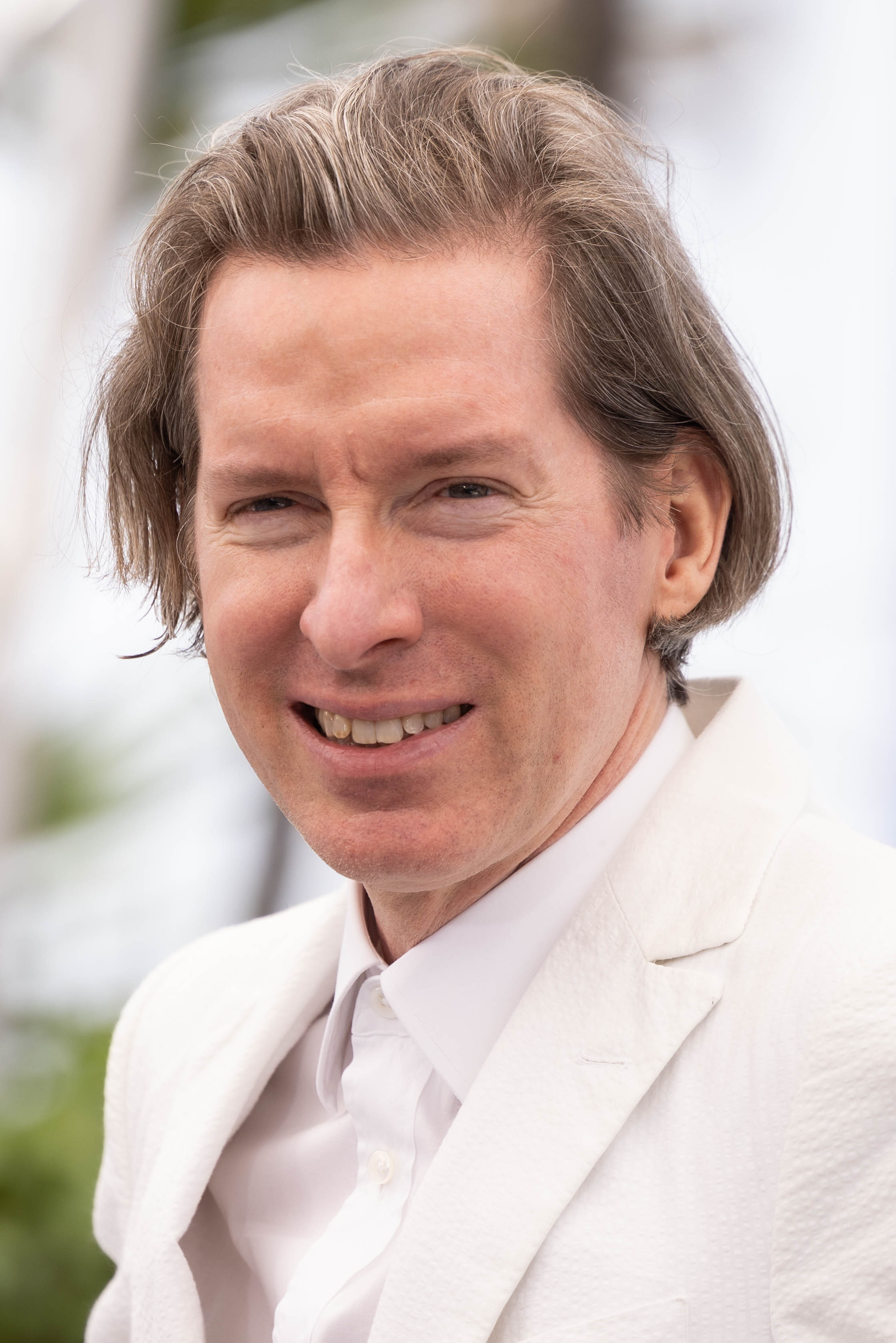
- Anderson in 2025
- Born: Wesley Wales Anderson; May 1, 1969 (age 57); Houston, Texas, U.S.
- Education: University of Texas at Austin (BA)
- Occupations: Film director; producer; screenwriter
- Years active: 1994–present
- Notable work: Full list
- Partner: Juman Malouf
- Children: 1
- Relatives: Eric Chase Anderson (brother)
- Awards: Full list

Wesley Wales Anderson (born May 1, 1969) is an American filmmaker. His films are known for themes of grief, loss of innocence, and dysfunctional families. Due to his films' eccentricity, distinctive visual and narrative styles, and frequent use of ensemble casts, critics have described Anderson as an auteur. He has received various accolades, including an Academy Award, a BAFTA Award, and nominations for four Golden Globe Awards. Three of his films appeared in BBC Culture's 2016 poll of the greatest films since 2000.

Anderson gained acclaim for his early films Bottle Rocket (1996) and Rushmore (1998). He often collaborated with the brothers Luke Wilson and Owen Wilson during that time and founded his production company American Empirical Pictures. He received a nomination for the Academy Award for Best Original Screenplay for The Royal Tenenbaums (2001). His next films included The Life Aquatic with Steve Zissou (2004), The Darjeeling Limited (2007), and his first stop-motion film, Fantastic Mr. Fox (2009), for which he received a Best Animated Feature nomination, and then Moonrise Kingdom (2012), earning his second Best Original Screenplay nomination.

For his film The Grand Budapest Hotel (2014), he received his first Academy Award nominations for Best Director and Best Picture, and also his third Best Original Screenplay nomination, and won the BAFTA Award for Best Original Screenplay. Later works include his second stop-motion film, Isle of Dogs (2018), earning him the Silver Bear for Best Director and another Best Animated Feature nomination, followed by The French Dispatch (2021), Asteroid City (2023) and The Phoenician Scheme (2025). Anderson won the Academy Award for Best Live Action Short Film for The Wonderful Story of Henry Sugar (2023). Rushmore and The Grand Budapest Hotel have been inducted into the National Film Registry.

== Early life and education ==
Wesley Wales Anderson was born on May 1, 1969, in Houston, Texas, to Melver Leonard Anderson, who worked in advertising and public relations, and Texas Anne Anderson (née Burroughs), a realtor and archaeologist. His parents divorced when he was eight. He is the second of three boys; his older brother is a physician, and his younger brother, Eric Chase Anderson, is a writer and artist whose paintings and designs have appeared in several of Anderson's films, including The Royal Tenenbaums. Anderson is of English, Swedish, and Norwegian ancestry.

He graduated from St. John's School in Houston in 1987, which he later used as a prominent location in Rushmore. As a child, Anderson made silent films on his father's Super 8 camera, which starred his brothers and friends, although his first ambition was to be a writer. Anderson worked part-time as a cinema projectionist at Hogg Memorial Auditorium while attending the University of Texas at Austin, where he met his roommate and future collaborator Owen Wilson in 1989. In 1991, he graduated with a Bachelor of Arts with a major in philosophy. He describes being intrigued by The Meaning of Meaning by C. K. Ogden and I. A. Richards.

== Career ==
=== 1990s ===
Anderson's first film was Bottle Rocket (1996), based on a short film of the same name that he made with Luke and Owen Wilson. It is a crime caper about a group of young Texans aspiring to achieve major heists. It was well reviewed but performed poorly at the box office.

His next film was Rushmore (1998), a quirky comedy about a high school student's crush on an elementary school teacher, starring Jason Schwartzman, Bill Murray, and Olivia Williams. It was a critical and financial success. The film launched Murray's second act as a respected actor in independent cinema. Murray appeared in many of Anderson's subsequent films. At the 1999 Independent Spirit Awards, Anderson won the Best Director award and Murray won Best Supporting Male. Murray also earned a nomination for Golden Globe Award for Best Supporting Actor – Motion Picture. In 2000, filmmaker Martin Scorsese praised Bottle Rocket and Rushmore. Since its release, Rushmore has gained cult status, and in 2016, the film was selected for preservation in the United States National Film Registry by the Library of Congress.

Anderson founded his production company American Empirical Pictures in the 1990s.

=== 2000s ===
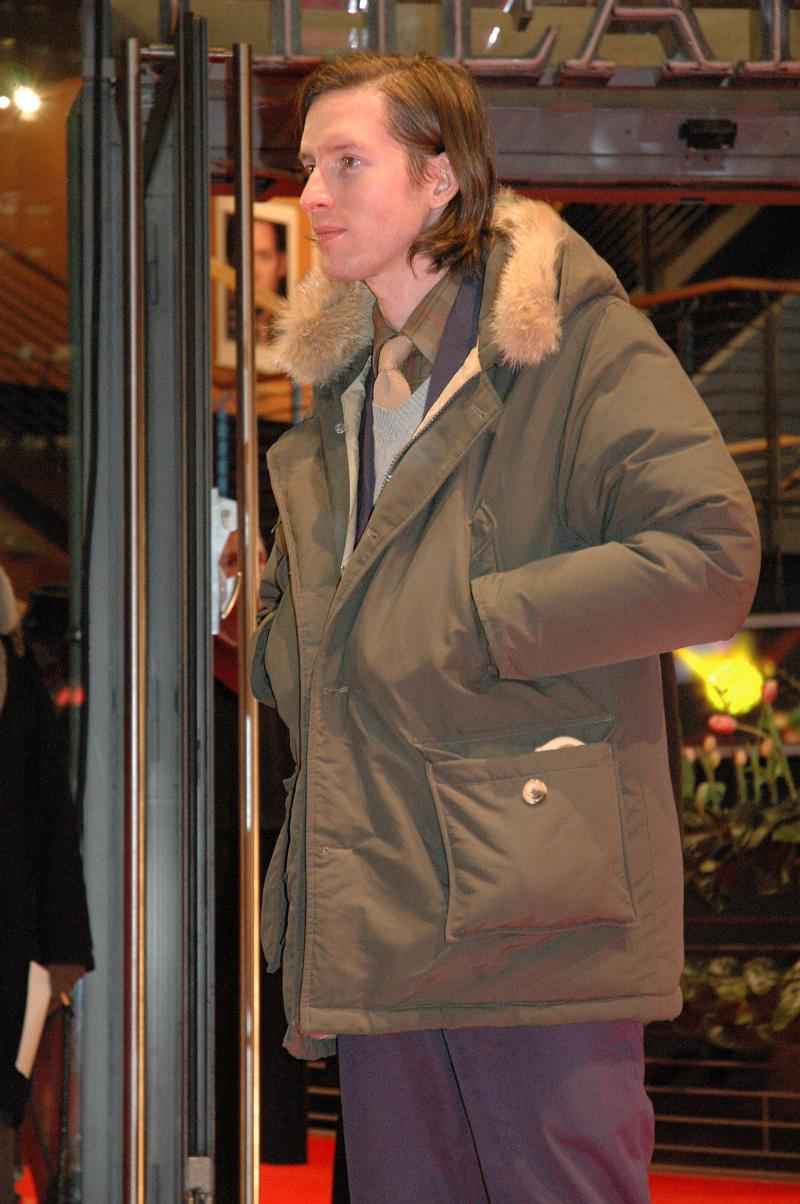
Anderson at the Berlin Film Festival in 2005

Anderson's next comedy-drama, The Royal Tenenbaums, was released in 2001. The film focuses on a successful, artistic New York City family and its ostracized patriarch, played by Gene Hackman. It also stars Anjelica Huston as the ex-wife and Ben Stiller, Luke Wilson, and Gwyneth Paltrow as the children. The film was a box-office and critical success. It was Anderson's greatest financial success until Moonrise Kingdom, earning more than $50 million in domestic box-office receipts. The Royal Tenenbaums was nominated for an Academy Award and ranked by an Empire poll as the 159th greatest film ever made.

Anderson's next feature was The Life Aquatic with Steve Zissou (2004), about a Jacques Cousteau-esque documentary filmmaker played by Bill Murray. The film also stars Owen Wilson, Cate Blanchett, Willem Dafoe, Jeff Goldblum, Anjelica Huston, and Michael Gambon. The film's critical reception and box office success was less favorable than The Royal Tenenbaums.

Anderson with Noah Baumbach in 2006

The Darjeeling Limited (2007) was about three emotionally distant brothers traveling together on a train in India. It reflects the more dramatic tone of The Royal Tenenbaums but faced criticism similar to that of The Life Aquatic with Steve Zissou. Anderson has acknowledged that he went to India to film the movie partly as a tribute to Indian filmmaker Satyajit Ray, whose "films have also inspired all my other movies in different ways" (the film is dedicated to him). The film stars Anderson staples Jason Schwartzman and Owen Wilson in addition to Adrien Brody, and the script is by Anderson, Schwartzman, and Roman Coppola.

Anderson has also made several notable short films. In addition to the original Bottle Rocket short, he made Hotel Chevalier (2007), which is set in Paris. It is a prologue to The Darjeeling Limited, and stars Schwartzman alongside Natalie Portman. He wrote a script for Brian Grazer for an English-language remake of Patrice Leconte's My Best Friend. In 2010 he said that he did not plan to direct the film, tentatively called The Rosenthaler Suite. In 2009, Anderson's stop-motion-animated film adaptation based on the Roald Dahl book Fantastic Mr Fox was released. Its voice actors include Murray, Dafoe, Schwartzman, Brody, Gambon, Owen Wilson, George Clooney, and Meryl Streep. Critics praised it highly and it was nominated for the Academy Award for Best Animated Feature, although it barely made back its production budget.

=== 2010s ===
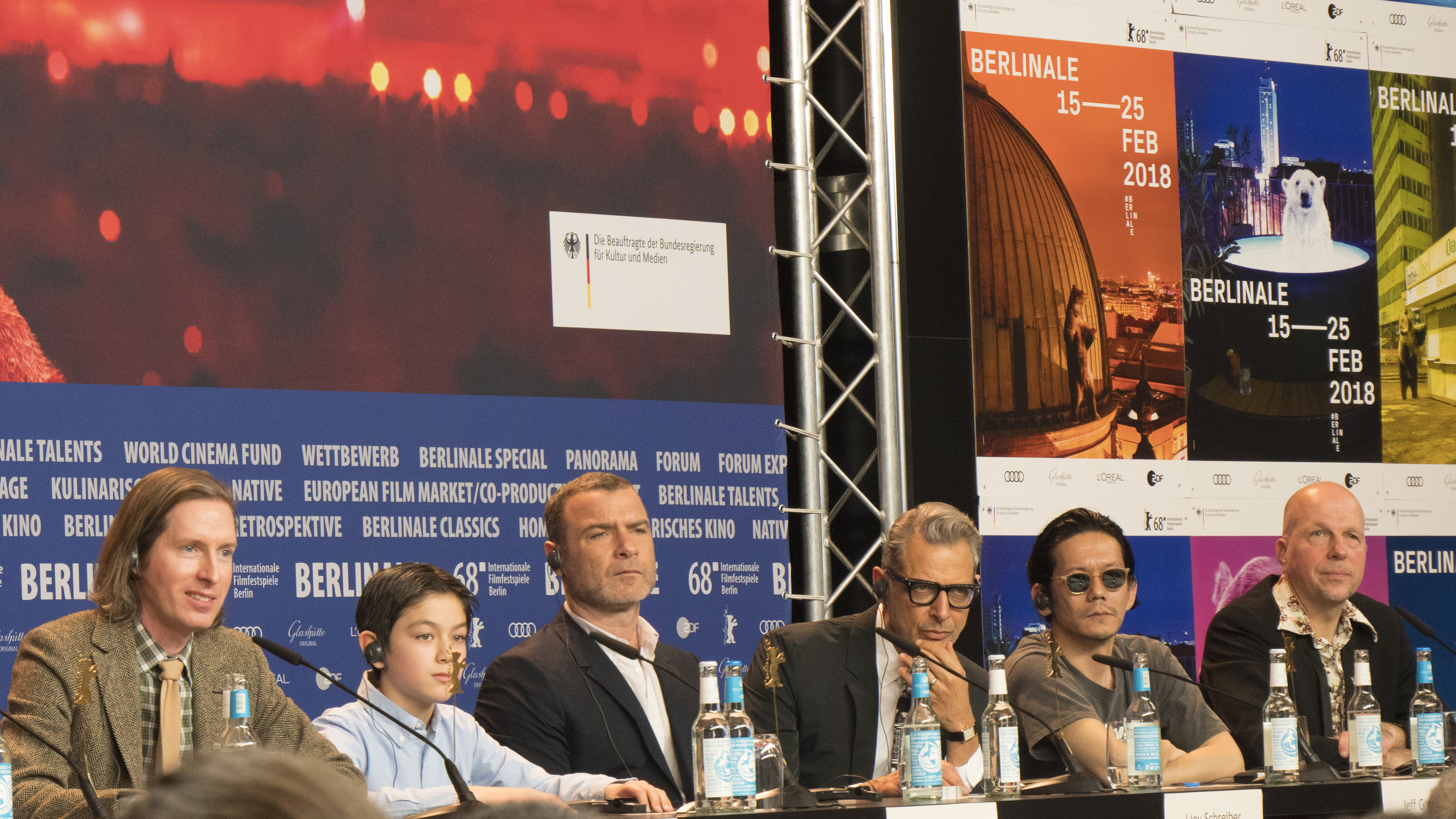
Anderson, Koyu Rankin, Liev Schreiber, Jeff Goldblum, Kunichi Nomura, and panel moderator Anatol Weber at the Isle of Dogs press conference at Berlinale 2018

In 2012, Anderson's film Moonrise Kingdom was released, debuting at the Cannes Film Festival, where it competed for the Palme d'Or. The film is a coming-of-age comedy set in a fictional New England town. It includes ensemble performances by Bill Murray, Edward Norton, Bruce Willis, Frances McDormand, and Tilda Swinton. The film is emblematic of Anderson's style and earned him another Academy Award nomination for his screenplay. The film was also a financial success, earning $68.3 million at the box office against a budget of only $16 million.

In 2014, Anderson's next film, The Grand Budapest Hotel, was released. It stars Ralph Fiennes, Tony Revolori, Saoirse Ronan, Jeff Goldblum, Willem Dafoe, F. Murray Abraham, and several of Anderson's regular collaborators, including Murray, Owen Wilson, Swinton, and Schwartzman. It is mostly set in the 1930s and follows the adventures of M. Gustave, the hotel's concierge, making "a marvelous mockery of history, turning its horrors into a series of graceful jokes and mischievous gestures", according to The New York Times. The film is one of Anderson's greatest critical and commercial successes, grossing nearly $175 million worldwide and earning dozens of award nominations, including nine Oscar nominations with four wins for Best Production Design, Best Costume Design, Best Makeup, and Best Original Score. It won the BAFTA Award for Best Original Screenplay in 2015.

Anderson returned to stop-motion animation with Isle of Dogs. Production on the film started in the United Kingdom in October 2016, and it was released in March–April 2018. The film received Academy Award nominations for Best Animated Feature and Best Original Score.

Three of his films appeared in BBC Culture's 2016 poll of the greatest films since 2000. (Note: Moonrise Kingdom (2012) at no. 95; The Royal Tenenbaums (2001) at no. 68; and The Grand Budapest Hotel (2014) at no. 21.)

He earned the Silver Bear for Best Director and another Best Animated Feature nomination for his second stop-motion film, Isle of Dogs, released in 2018.

=== 2020s ===
Anderson's film The French Dispatch is set in post-war France and stars Benicio Del Toro, Jeffrey Wright, Bill Murray, Frances McDormand, Owen Wilson, Willem Dafoe, Adrien Brody, Tilda Swinton and Timothée Chalamet. Its release was delayed due to the COVID-19 pandemic, finally premiering at the Cannes Film Festival on July 12, 2021, with a general release in the United States on October 22, 2021. In the meantime, Searchlight Pictures released in September 2021 an animated music video of Christophe's "Aline" covered by Jarvis Cocker, directed by Anderson with animations by Javi Aznarez.

In November 2021, Anderson finished filming Asteroid City, but few details were revealed to the press. Much of the film was shot in the Spanish city of Chinchón, where a huge diorama set reproducing Monument Valley was constructed. The film stars Tom Hanks, Scarlett Johansson, Adrien Brody, Tilda Swinton, Bryan Cranston, Jeff Goldblum, Hope Davis, and Jeffrey Wright, among others. It premiered at the 2023 Cannes Film Festival and had its US theatrical release on June 16, 2023, receiving generally positive reviews.

Anderson then directed an adaptation of Roald Dahl's short story collection The Wonderful Story of Henry Sugar and Six More for Netflix. The 41-minute short film titled The Wonderful Story of Henry Sugar premiered at the 2023 Venice Film Festival. It received critical acclaim. It was followed by a limited U.S. theatrical release on September 20, and a Netflix premiere on September 27, 2023. It stars Benedict Cumberbatch, Dev Patel, Ralph Fiennes, and Ben Kingsley. Anderson had three other short films based on Roald Dahl's work also premiere on Netflix in September 2023. The other shorts, all of which are 16 minutes long, were The Swan, The Rat Catcher, and Poison. They were released on September 28, September 29, and September 30, respectively. At the 96th Academy Awards, The Wonderful Story of Henry Sugar was nominated for Best Live Action Short Film and won, earning Wes Anderson's first Oscar win; however, he did not appear in-person to accept the Oscar due to his filming schedule. The same month the four short films were combined into one anthology film titled The Wonderful Story of Henry Sugar and Three More which released March 15, 2024 on Netflix.

Anderson's most recent film, titled The Phoenician Scheme, released in the United States on May 30, 2025, premiering in the 2025 Cannes Film Festival earlier that month. The film stars Benicio del Toro, Mia Threapleton, Riz Ahmed, Tom Hanks, Michael Cera, Bryan Cranston, and Mathieu Amalric, with a release date of June 29, 2025 planned for Germany, where it was shot. The film received generally positive reviews and a nomination for a Palme d'Or.

== Style and directing techniques ==
But it's also what surrounds it, where all the actors stay in the same hotel. We have dinner at one table every single night with Wes and all guests; it's like actor camp ... On a Wes Anderson film there are no trailers, no dressing rooms ... there's no hierarchy, no call sheet—you are just ready to go at about 9:30, 10:00 in the morning in your wardrobe. You hop in his golf cart with him or a van and you go to the set ... you hang out with everyone so you never know if you are going to be called into a scene. He's such a kind and generous spirit ... also in his personal life. Everyone makes the same amount of money. You just show up and off you go. Sometimes you might [be] just a small supporting role in a scene and then [in] others you'll be the lead in a movie.

— American actor Bryan Cranston and his experience working with Anderson (2023).

Anderson's cinematic influences include Pedro Almodóvar, Satyajit Ray, Hal Ashby, Orson Welles, Jean Renoir, Ingmar Bergman, Martin Scorsese, Federico Fellini, François Truffaut, Claude Sautet, Stanley Kubrick, Roman Polanski, Akira Kurosawa and Hayao Miyazaki. He has a unique directorial style that has led several critics to consider him an auteur. The Los Angeles Times referred to the "handmade aesthetic, signature curios and saturated colors" of his films, making them "identifiable in every frame". He is considered a central figure in American eccentric cinema.

=== Favorite films ===
In 2010, Wes Anderson selected twelve of his favorite films from the Criterion closet. Titles three through five were a boxset. They were:

1. The Earrings of Madame de... (1953)
2. Au hasard Balthazar (1966)
3. Pigs and Battleships (1961)
4. The Insect Woman (1963)
5. Unholy Desire (1964)
6. The Taking of Power by Louis XIV (1966)
7. The Spy Who Came in from the Cold (1965)
8. The Friends of Eddie Coyle (1973)
9. Classe tous risques (1960)
10. Naked Childhood (1968)
11. Mishima: A Life in Four Chapters (1985)
12. The Exterminating Angel (1962)

In 2022, Wes Anderson participated in the British Film Institute's Sight and Sound polls. Held every ten years to select the greatest films of all time, contemporary directors were asked to select ten films of their choice. Anderson's choices, all French, in chronological order, were:

- La Grande Illusion (1937)
- Quai des Orfèvres (1947)
- The Earrings of Madame de... (1953)
- Vivre sa vie (1962)
- The Man Who Loved Women (1977)
- Loulou (1980)
- Vagabond (1985)
- Olivier, Olivier (1993)
- It All Starts Today (1999)
- Rois et reine (2004)

=== Themes and stories ===
Anderson's work has been classified as postmodern, on account of his nostalgic attention to detail, his subversion of mainstream conventions of narrative, his references to different genres in the same film, and his love for eccentric characters with complex sexual identities.

Anderson has mostly directed fast-paced comedies marked by more serious or melancholic elements, with themes often centered on grief, loss of innocence, dysfunctional families, parental abandonment, adultery, sibling rivalry, complicated romances, and unlikely friendships. His movies have been noted as unusually character-driven and, by turns, both derided and praised with terms like "literary geek chic". Their plots often feature thefts and unexpected disappearances, with a tendency to borrow liberally from the caper genre.

=== Visual style ===
According to Alex Buono, Anderson has been noted for extensive use of flat space camera moves (pans, tilts, and zooms within scenes that look two-dimensional), symmetrical compositions, snap-zooms (rapid, shakey zooms onto subjects), slow-motion walking shots, a deliberately limited color palette, and handmade art direction often using miniatures. These stylistic choices give his movies a distinctive quality that has provoked much discussion, critical study, supercuts, mash-ups, and parody. Many writers, critics, and Anderson himself have commented that this gives his movies the feel of being "self-contained worlds" or a "scale-model household". According to Jesse Fox Mayshark, his films have "a baroque pop bent that is not realist, surrealist or magic realist", but rather might be described as "fabul[ist]".

Since The Life Aquatic with Steve Zissou, Anderson has relied more heavily on stop motion animation and miniatures, even making entire features with stop motion animation with Fantastic Mr. Fox and Isle of Dogs.

=== Soundtracks ===
Anderson frequently uses pop music from the 1960s and '70s on the soundtracks of his films, and one band or musician tends to dominate each soundtrack. Rushmore prominently featured Cat Stevens and British Invasion groups; The Royal Tenenbaums featured Nico; The Life Aquatic with Steve Zissou, David Bowie, including both originals and covers performed by Seu Jorge; The Darjeeling Limited and Rushmore, the Kinks; Fantastic Mr. Fox, the Beach Boys; and Moonrise Kingdom, Hank Williams. Moonrise Kingdom is also filled with the music of Benjamin Britten, which is tied to a number of major plot points. The Darjeeling Limited also borrowed music styles from Satyajit Ray's films.

The Grand Budapest Hotel, which is mostly set in the 1930s, eschews pop music, instead using music by Alexandre Desplat. Its soundtrack won Desplat the Academy Award for Best Original Score, the BAFTA Award for Best Film Music, and World Soundtrack Award for Best Original Score of the Year.

The soundtracks for his films have often brought renewed attention to the artists featured, most prominently in the case of "These Days", which was used in The Royal Tenenbaums.

=== Recurring collaborators ===
Anderson's films feature many recurring actors, including the Wilson brothers (Owen, Luke, and Andrew), Bill Murray, Jason Schwartzman, Anjelica Huston, Willem Dafoe, Jeff Goldblum, Edward Norton, Adrien Brody, Scarlett Johansson, Bob Balaban, Tony Revolori, and Tilda Swinton. Robert Yeoman has served as director of photography for all of Anderson's live-action films, while Mark Mothersbaugh composed Anderson's first four films, and Alexandre Desplat the next six, taking over with Fantastic Mr. Fox. Randall Poster has served as music supervisor for all of Anderson's films since Rushmore. Anderson has co-written films with Owen Wilson, Noah Baumbach, Roman Coppola, and Hugo Guinness. His films have often been financed by Steven Rales through his production company Indian Paintbrush.

== Design ==
Anderson has applied his visual aesthetic to interior design projects:

- In 2015, he designed Bar Luce, a café inside the Fondazione Prada arts complex in Milan. The space draws on Milanese architectural history, including the Galleria Vittorio Emanuele II, and the look of Italian Neorealist films such as Miracle in Milan (1951) and Rocco and His Brothers (1960).
- In 2021, Anderson redesigned the interior of the Pullman carriage Cygnus for the Belmond British Pullman train. The carriage had its first run on October 13, 2021.

In 2025, La Cinémathèque Française and the Design Museum (London) collaborated on a retrospective of Anderson's film work; the exhibit included sketches, paintings, models and other design elements of his movies. It was first shown at La Cinémathèque Française (19 March 2025 – 27 July 2025) before traveling to the Design Museum (1 November 2025 – 26 July 2026).

Anderson collaborated with Gagosian Gallery, Paris, in its The House of Utopia Parkway: Joseph Cornell's Studio Re-Created by Wes Anderson exhibit (on display December 16, 2025, to March 14, 2026). The exhibit recreated Cornell's Queens, New York studio.

== Personal life ==
Anderson is in a romantic relationship with Lebanese writer, costume designer, and voice actress Juman Malouf, the daughter of novelist Hanan al-Shaykh. Malouf gave birth to the couple's daughter, with Bill Murray serving as godfather.

After spending most of his earlier adult life in New York City, Anderson moved to France where he has maintained an apartment in Paris's 14th arrondissement since 2005. He frequently visits his family in Houston.

== Filmography ==
Directed features
Year	Title	Distributor
1996	Bottle Rocket	Sony Pictures Releasing
1998	Rushmore	Buena Vista Pictures
2001	The Royal Tenenbaums	Buena Vista Pictures
2004	The Life Aquatic with Steve Zissou	Buena Vista Pictures
2007	The Darjeeling Limited	Fox Searchlight Pictures
2009	Fantastic Mr. Fox	20th Century Fox
2012	Moonrise Kingdom	Focus Features
2014	The Grand Budapest Hotel	Fox Searchlight Pictures
2018	Isle of Dogs	Fox Searchlight Pictures
2021	The French Dispatch	Searchlight Pictures
2023	Asteroid City	Focus Features
2024	The Wonderful Story of Henry Sugar and Three More	Netflix
2025	The Phoenician Scheme	Focus Features

== Awards and nominations ==
Year	Title	Academy Awards		BAFTA Awards		Golden Globe Awards	
Year	Title	Nominations	Wins	Nominations	Wins	Nominations	Wins
1998	Rushmore					1	
2001	The Royal Tenenbaums	1		1		1	1
2009	Fantastic Mr. Fox	2		2		1	
2012	Moonrise Kingdom	1		1		1	
2014	The Grand Budapest Hotel	9	4	11	5	4	1
2018	Isle of Dogs	2		2		2	
2021	The French Dispatch			3		1	
2023	The Wonderful Story of Henry Sugar	1	1				
Total		16	5	20	5	11	2

== In popular culture ==
Anderson's distinctive filmmaking style has led to numerous homages and parodies. Notable examples include:

- In October 2013, Saturday Night Live, in an episode hosted by Edward Norton, presented a parody trailer for a fictional Wes Anderson horror movie titled The Midnight Coterie of Sinister Intruders.
- The Instagram account and book series Accidentally Wes Anderson, founded in 2017, collects photographs of real-world locations that resemble Anderson's visual style. The account has nearly 2 million followers, and its Webby Award–winning website is a travel guide. Anderson wrote the forewords to both books, and the project has held exhibitions in Seoul, Tokyo, London, and Hong Kong.
- In November 2017, Family Guy aired its sixteenth season episode titled "Three Directors", about Peter Griffin's firing from his job at the brewery, as told in the idiosyncratic styles of directors Quentin Tarantino, Anderson and Michael Bay.
- In 2019, the company Murals Wallpaper launched a line of wallpapers inspired by the visual design of Anderson's films.
- In January 2021, The Simpsons aired its thirty-second season episode titled "The Dad-Feelings Limited", a reference to Anderson's 2007 film The Darjeeling Limited. The episode itself tells the origin story of Comic Book Guy and refers to several Anderson styles and tropes, including a Royal Tenenbaums-esque chronicling of the character's elaborate family tree.
- On July 26, 2023, the fourth episode of Season 2 of The Afterparty, the portion of the episode shown as a flashback is a clear homage to Anderson's style of filmmaking.

== Bibliography ==
- "Special Issue: Wes Anderson, Austin Auteur". Texas Studies in Literature and Language. 60 (2). 2018.
- Seitz, Matt Zoller (2013). The Wes Anderson Collection. New York, New York: Harry N. Abrams. ISBN 9780810997417.
- Browning, Mark (2011). Wes Anderson: why his movies matter. Santa Barbara, Calif: Praeger. ISBN 9781598843521.
- "Special Issue: Wes Anderson & Co". New Review of Film and Television Studies. 10 (1). 2012.
- MacDowell, James (2010). "Notes on Quirky" (PDF). Movie: A Journal of Film Criticism. Warwick University.
- Kunze, Peter C., ed. (2014). The films of Wes Anderson: Critical essays on an Indiewood icon. New York, NY: Palgrave Macmillan. ISBN 9781349486922.
- Morris, Joshua T. (2024). "Wes Anderson, Unexamined Grief, and Pediatric Chaplaincy: An Autoethnographic Reflection". Pastoral Psychol. 73 (4): 509–519. doi:10.1007/s11089-024-01122-1.
