= Race the Sun (film) =

1996 film by Charles T. Kanganis

- Theatrical release poster
- Directed by: Charles T. Kanganis
- Written by: Barry Morrow
- Produced by: Richard Heus; Barry Morrow
- Starring: Halle Berry; Casey Affleck; Eliza Dushku; Kevin Tighe; James Belushi
- Cinematography: David Burr
- Edited by: Wendy Greene Bricmont
- Music by: Graeme Revell
- Distributed by: TriStar Pictures
- Release date: March 22, 1996
- Running time: 100 minutes
- Language: English
- Box office: $1,945,552

Race the Sun is a 1996 American comedy-drama film directed by Charles T. Kanganis and starring Halle Berry and James Belushi alongside Casey Affleck, Eliza Dushku, and Kevin Tighe. The plot is loosely based on the true story of the Konawaena High School Solar Car Team, which finished 18th in the 1990 World Solar Challenge and first place among high school entries.

== Plot ==
Sandra Beecher arrives at Kona Pali High School, Hawaii, to replace a science teacher who quit. She meets shop teacher Frank Machi, who orients her. In her first class she meets several students, including: Daniel Webster, a surfer and aspiring designer; Marco Quito, an outspoken and flashy cool kid; Gilbert Tutu, an overweight and shy, yet brilliant computer geek; Oni Nagano, a whiny valley girl of Japanese descent; Eduardo Braz, a young mechanic who is quick to defend his heritage and his friends from insults; and Luana Kanahele, Eduardo's girlfriend. Sandra confesses straightaway to her class that she doesn't teach science, but English, yet emphasizes that unlike the other teachers she will push them through their classes despite their self-declared "lolo" (stupid) status.

In a teachers' meeting, Sandra attempts to raise awareness for the science fair that week since no students at Kona Pali are participating. She fails, as her colleagues are pessimistic regarding what can be accomplished at the school. Frank tells her that she will understand with time. Daniel's boss rejects his design for an experimental surfboard, telling him to stick to the preset designs. The next day, Sandra calls Daniel, Braz, Marco, Gilbert, Oni, and Luana. The six are the only students not to offer a proposal for a science project so she requires them to attend the district science fair the following night to come up with ideas.

At the fair, a solar car model by Sutcliffe Academy is showcased as an entry for the upcoming Hawaiian inter-island solar car race. Jack Fryman, marketing vice-president of Celtech Corporation and father of Steve Fryman, one of the students involved, announces that the winner will enter the World Solar Challenge, a six-day race held in Australia. Gilbert and Daniel express interest but the rest call it a "haole" affair. When Daniel admires the mini-model of the solar car, Steve instantly tells him not to go near it, calling him a lolo. The other students arrive and Marco instantly begins to trade words with Steve, and Sandra attempts to defuse the situation by getting them to walk away. Steve, however, directs one last sexually degrading comment towards Luana, and Braz punches him. Jack Fryman arrives and Steve claims that Braz attacked him for no reason. Jack has security escort Braz out, calling him an animal.

In Saturday detention, the six start talking. Daniel is eventually blamed for their situation, and Braz attacks him calling him a haole given his behavior. Daniel tells Braz he is just as local as the rest of them. When Braz proposes retaliating violently against the Sutcliffe team, Daniel shows him a sketch for a solar car, as another means of fighting back. The six students visit Sandra and show her the sketch as their proposal for the science project. They are determined to do it although the race is in two months, whether or not they receive credit, since they want to get back at Sutcliffe. Braz will be the mechanic, Daniel the designer and handler of fiberglass, Marco the lead driver. Gilbert's computer knowledge is also employed while Luana is left to eventually think of a position with the team. Oni then introduces Uni Kakamura, a math prodigy just as shy as Gilbert, as another team-member, and Daniel says he could bring someone else in. Sandra eventually relents and agrees.

Daniel persuades Cindy Johnson, his rebellious stepsister, to join them. The team starts work on the car, yet struggle to manifest Daniel's design. Sandra asks Frank for help, but he refuses, saying the students are lolos with no higher aspirations than being low-income workers. Gilbert, however, refuses to give up on the project and refuses to get out of the skeleton of the car even after falling under his weight. Frank tells Sandra he will handle the situation, but after she leaves tells Gilbert to stay in the car all the time he wants.

The next morning Daniel sees a cockroach and has inspiration for a more ergonomic design. The team manage to build Daniel's second design in time for the race, naming it "Cockroach". At a teachers' meeting, Sandra states that if the Kona Pali team qualifies for the Australian race they will need a male chaperone. She goads Frank into signing up.

The day of the race, Daniel has the sudden idea to put an extra battery in the car. Daniel, a surfer, can predict sky conditions, and claims it will be cloudy that afternoon. Consequently the Kona Pali team outperforms everyone else and barely qualifies by completing the required hundred laps, defeating Sutcliffe Academy and a resentful Steve in the process.

Jack Fryman attempts to have the Cockroach rebuilt and redesigned with Celtech's solar panels after pressure from his superiors, but the team refuses with Braz emphasizing that their car was built by "animals". Arriving in Australia, the drivers are weighed in and Gilbert registers himself as an alternate. The students are nearly demoralized on seeing the arrival of Hans Kooiman and the Euro Team among other entries, but are reassured that they are here to race like everyone else. The night before the first day, Sandra announces they must choose a captain; Daniel's double-battery idea gets him the nomination.

On the first day the Cockroach suffers a busted balljoint. Jack Fryman tells them to either fix the car or leave the race; Frank warns Jack not to interfere again. The team eventually manages to repair the car, but fall greatly behind as a result. When reaching their camping stop for the night, they're told not to despair since the highway can play tricks and even the odd. On the second day a sandstorm hits that damages several cars, but the Cockroach and Cindy survive intact. That night, Frank tells Sandra that he made it to Kona Pali because of Gilbert. Gilbert's father, John Francis Tutu, was a machinist on the USS Clark where a 22-year-old Frank was also stationed. One day an oxygen tank blew up and killed four men, including Gilbert's father who jumped in front of Frank to save his life.

On the third day they arrive at the halfway point of the race, interrupting Hans Kooiman's interview. Upon arriving, Luana is named their spokeswoman. That night at the hotel, Marco mocks Gilbert for being a registered driver, and Cindy tells Uni that she should stand up to Oni, who always bosses her around. At a reception dinner, Marco and Oni dance with the local Australians while Sandra and Frank have dinner and talk about their respective divorces before being brought onto the dancefloor by Marco and Oni respectively. Gilbert and Uni look on and decide they don't want to dance, with a mutual attraction growing between them. As Braz and Luana walk through the nearby streets, they see Jack talking to Daniel, having approached him moments earlier in an attempt to persuade him and the team to drop out of the race. Moments later, Daniel sees Cindy on a bike while drinking from a flask.

On the fourth day Cindy is too hungover to drive, and is disqualified from driving for the rest of the race for drinking while in a school-sponsored event. Daniel reveals himself as the one who exposed her. Cindy runs off to be alone and Daniel follows her and tries to talk some sense into her, but she rejects him. On the fifth day Oni contracts a fever and cannot continue. Marco goes head-to-head with Hans Kooiman and both are barely missed by two road trains. When Daniel tries to apologize, Hans is hostile. Braz tries to defuse the situation and Hans spits at him in an attempt to instigate a fight but Braz restrains himself. Braz then attacks Daniel, claiming to be the one having to fight his fights after he screws up and revealing that he saw him talking to Jack and accuses him of trying to sabotage them on purpose and once more calling him a Haole. Daniel resigns as captain and gives Braz the position. That night the atmosphere among them all is deathly quiet, with Braz quietly voicing his fears to Luana.

On the final day, Marco also suffers from the heat and becomes delirious while in the car causing it to swerve onto the dry sand as Hans and his team pass them. Uni, the only one left, takes the wheel while the rest follow her. The Cockroach suffers an electrical fire, however, and swerves off the road onto the edge of a small cliff. Daniel and Braz try to save her together, but Gilbert simply comes and smashes the windshield to get her out while Frank extinguishes the fire. Checking the gauges, Braz determines that the car can still make it. Frank claims they're out of drivers, but Gilbert offers himself showing that he is registered with Marco's confirmation. Frank tells him that the car won't move with him inside and tells the students that, as the first high-school team to enter the race, they can never be called Lolos again. Daniel says he will always see himself as a Lolo if they quit now. He theorizes that the car will walk with Gilbert driving it if the solar panels are dropped. Braz and Daniel put their differences aside and Braz tells Daniel to lead them.

Hans' solar car is stuck in a ditch as Gilbert slowly passes him and the Euro team. Gilbert drives with cheers from the rest of the team but begins to doubt himself when approaching a hill before the finish line. The Cockroach crawls and the rest of the team runs to his side to keep him from giving in, with Uni finally standing up to Oni as Hans passes them smugly. Through their encouragement, Gilbert finally manages to pass over the hill and Marco gets on the back of the Cockroach to coach him as they gain momentum and catch up to Hans. Eventually using a maneuver that makes Hans' car flip over on momentum, the Kona Pali team is cleared to finish in third place, much to Jack Fryman's dismay. Not long before reaching however, the wheels detach under the weight and strain. Gilbert and Marco are left dragging towards the finish line as the audience rises to its feet in anticipation. The Cockroach barely arrives and crosses the finish line, officially finishing the race. Both the team and the Kona Pali community watching from Hawaii celebrate the victory, with Gilbert and Uni kissing as well as Oni kissing Marco. Daniel and Cindy put aside their differences and she calls herself Daniel's sister.

== Cast ==
- Halle Berry as Sandra Beecher
- James Belushi as Frank Machi
- Bill Hunter as Commissioner Hawkes
- Casey Affleck as Daniel Webster
- Eliza Dushku as Cindy Johnson
- Kevin Tighe as Jack Fryman
- Anthony Ruivivar as Eduardo Braz
- J. Moki Cho as Gilbert Tutu
- Dion Basco as Marco Quito
- Sara Tanaka as Uni Kakamura
- Nadja Pionilla as Oni Nagano
- Adriane Napualani Uganiza as Luana Kanahele
- Steve Zahn as Hans Kooiman
- Robert Hughes as Judd Potter
- Jeff Truman as Ed Webster
- Joel Edgerton as Steve Fryman
- Marshall Napier as Mr Cronin
- Tyler Coppin as Bob Radgford

== Production ==
The film was written and co-produced by Barry Morrow, who had shared the 1988 Academy Award for Writing Original Screenplay for Rain Man. The story was based on the solar car team from Konawaena High School, which finished 18th overall in the 1990 World Solar Challenge and first place among high school entries, and was the first high school team to finish the Challenge.

== Reception ==
Stephen Holden of The New York Times said the "movie doesn't waste time admiring the technology at the expense of human drama, of which there is plenty, none of it overblown". Peter Stack of the San Francisco Chronicle compared Race the Sun to Cool Runnings for solar cars, saying it "boasts not only the lively spectacle of the race but also the kids learning to set aside their differences and insecurities to bond as a team. It's not a soaring, transcendent film experience – mostly it's corny and predictable. But it has a certain sunny charm and a few winning gags to keep it in the winning column." Carole Glines of Box Office Magazine also mentions the film's predictability, saying the student characters "all receive about a minute of screen time for character development as the plot paces through its predictable course." Hollis Chacona of the Austin Chronicle said "you might as well call this movie Hot Runnings", and notes that J. Moki Cho's character Gilbert gives this film substance and a "sweet quality that makes it easier to swallow than you might expect".

The film grossed $1.1 million on its opening weekend and grossed a total of $1.9 million in the U.S.

== See also ==
- Cinema of Australia
