= The Royal Tenenbaums =

2001 film by Wes Anderson

- Theatrical release poster
- Directed by: Wes Anderson
- Written by: Wes Anderson; Owen Wilson
- Produced by: Wes Anderson; Barry Mendel; Scott Rudin
- Starring: Danny Glover; Gene Hackman; Anjelica Huston; Bill Murray; Gwyneth Paltrow; Ben Stiller; Luke Wilson; Owen Wilson
- Narrated by: Alec Baldwin
- Cinematography: Robert Yeoman
- Edited by: Dylan Tichenor
- Music by: Mark Mothersbaugh
- Production companies: Touchstone Pictures; American Empirical Pictures
- Distributed by: Buena Vista Pictures Distribution
- Release dates: October 5, 2001 (New York Film Festival); December 14, 2001 (United States)
- Running time: 110 minutes
- Country: United States
- Language: English
- Budget: $21 million
- Box office: $71.4 million

The Royal Tenenbaums is a 2001 American black comedy-drama film directed by Wes Anderson and co-written by him and Owen Wilson. It stars Danny Glover, Gene Hackman, Anjelica Huston, Bill Murray, Gwyneth Paltrow, Ben Stiller, Luke Wilson, and Owen Wilson. Ostensibly based on a nonexistent novel, and told with a narrative influenced by the writing of J. D. Salinger, it follows the lives of three gifted siblings who experience great success in youth, and even greater disappointment and failure in adulthood. The children's eccentric father, Royal Tenenbaum (Hackman), leaves them in their adolescent years and returns to them after they have grown, claiming he has a terminal illness. He works on reconciling with his children and wife (Huston), from whom he has been separated, but not divorced.

With a variety of influences, including Louis Malle's 1963 film The Fire Within and Orson Welles's 1942 film The Magnificent Ambersons, the story involves themes of the dysfunctional family, lost greatness, and redemption. An absurdist and ironic sense of humor pervades the film, which features a soundtrack subsequently released in two albums. The Royal Tenenbaums was shot in and around New York City, including a house in Harlem used for the Tenenbaum residence. The filmmakers went to efforts to distinguish the film's backgrounds from a recognizable New York, with fashions and sets combining the appearances of different time periods.

After debuting at the New York Film Festival, The Royal Tenenbaums received positive reviews from critics and was Anderson's most financially successful film until 2014's The Grand Budapest Hotel. Hackman won a Golden Globe for Best Actor - Musical or Comedy for his performance at the 59th Golden Globe Awards, and Anderson and Wilson were nominated for the Academy Award for Best Original Screenplay at the 74th Academy Awards. In 2016, it was included in BBC's 100 Greatest Films of the 21st Century.

== Plot ==
Royal Tenenbaum explains to his three adolescent children, Chas, Margot, and Richie, that he and his wife, Etheline, are separating. Each of the children achieved great success at a young age. Chas is a math and business genius, from whom Royal steals money. Margot, who was adopted, is a playwright who was awarded a grant when in the ninth grade. Richie is a tennis prodigy and failed artist who is Royal’s favorite among the children. Eli Cash is the Tenenbaums' neighbor and Richie's best friend. Also part of the household is Pagoda, the trusted valet.

Twenty-two years later, Royal, a disbarred lawyer and ex-convict, is evicted from the hotel where he has been living. The children are in a post-success slump, with Richie traveling the world on an ocean liner following a breakdown during a tennis match. Margot is married to neurologist Raleigh St. Clair and is extremely secretive; she has not completed a play in seven years. Raleigh is conducting research on a patient named Dudley Heinsbergen. Chas has become overprotective of his sons, Ari and Uzi, following his wife Rachael's death in a plane crash. First Chas, with the boys, and then Margot, move back into the family home.

Etheline's longtime accountant, Henry Sherman, proposes to her. Learning of Henry's proposal from Pagoda, Royal claims he has stomach cancer in a bid to win back his wife's and children's affections. Richie returns home, and he then lets Royal move into the house and set up medical equipment in Richie's old bedroom.

Margot has been having an affair with Eli, now a successful author who is also a mescaline addict. He tells her Richie wrote to him that he loves her. Royal discovers Margot’s affair with Eli and objects to her treatment of Raleigh. Raleigh and Richie hire a private investigator to surveil her.

Royal observes Chas's overprotective nature and takes his grandsons out for some reckless amusement; Chas berates him for endangering the boys.

Henry investigates Royal's claim to have cancer and discovers that his supposed hospital has closed, his doctor does not exist, and his cancer medication is only Tic Tacs. He gathers the family to tell them that Royal has been lying about his illness, after which Royal and Pagoda are forced to move out of the house.

Richie and Raleigh get the investigator's report on Margot, which reveals that she has been smoking in secret since she was 12 and also has a history of sexual promiscuity. Both men take the news hard; Richie slashes his wrists in an attempt at suicide and is rushed to hospital. As the Tenenbaums sit in the waiting room, Raleigh confronts Margot about her past, tells her he knows that she smokes, and then says goodbye. Richie checks himself out of the hospital and goes home; he and Margot declare their love for each other.

Royal decides that he wants Etheline to be happy, and finally files for a divorce. Before Henry and Etheline's wedding, Eli, high on mescaline, crashes his car into the house. Royal rescues Ari and Uzi just in time, but the boys' dog, Buckley, is killed. Enraged, Chas chases Eli through the house; in the end, they agree that they both need help. Chas thanks Royal. Forty-eight hours later, Etheline and Henry are married in a judge's chambers.

After that, Margot releases a new play inspired by her family, Raleigh publishes a book about Dudley's condition, Eli checks himself into a drug rehabilitation facility in North Dakota, and Richie begins teaching tennis to children. Chas becomes less overprotective of his sons, and Royal enjoys an improved relationship with his family.

Royal suffers a heart attack and dies at the age of 68. Chas accompanies him in the ambulance on the way to the hospital and is the only witness to his death. The family attends his funeral, where the epitaph (which he wrote beforehand) reads that he "Died tragically rescuing his family from the wreckage of a destroyed sinking battleship."

== Cast ==
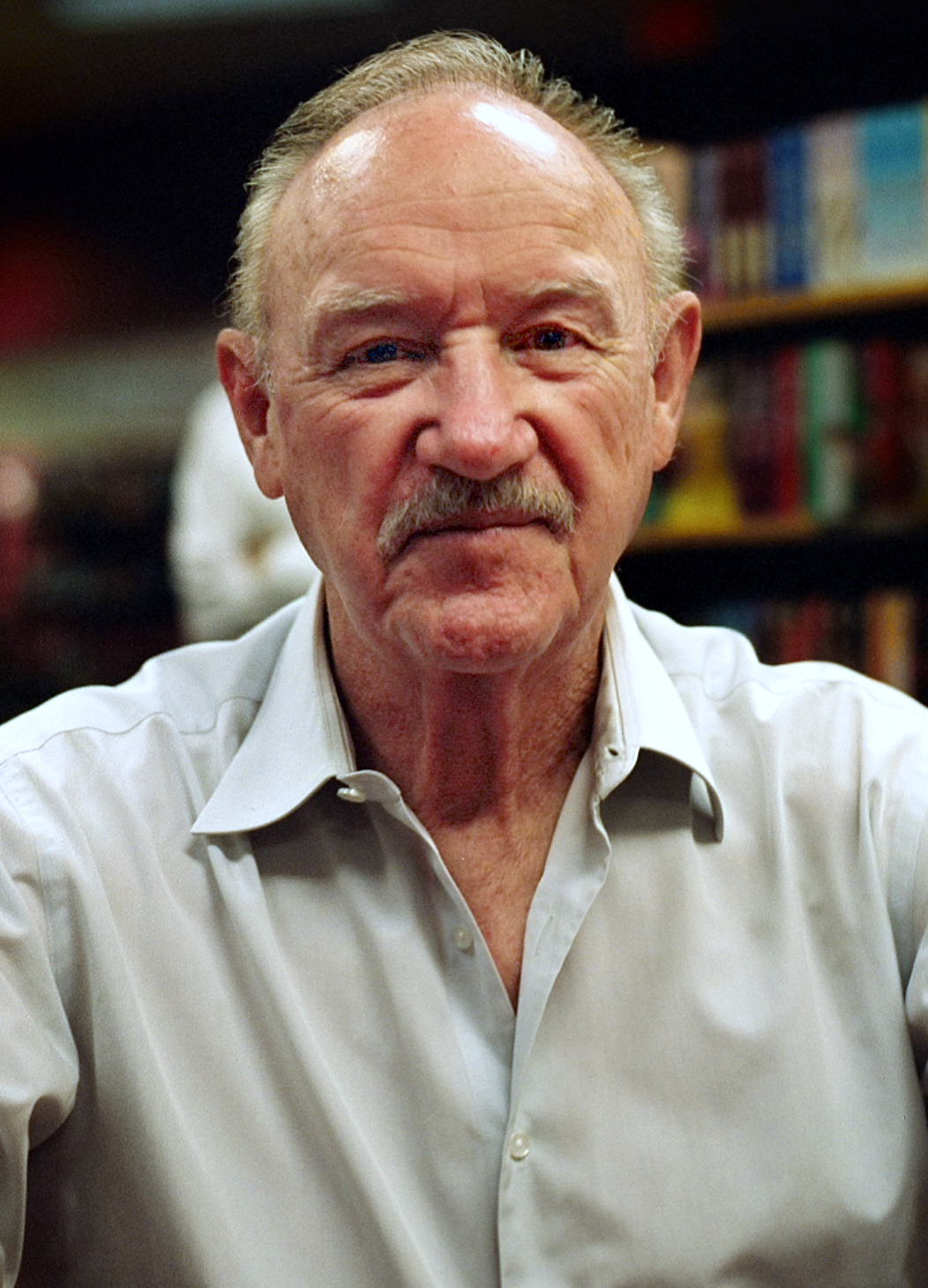
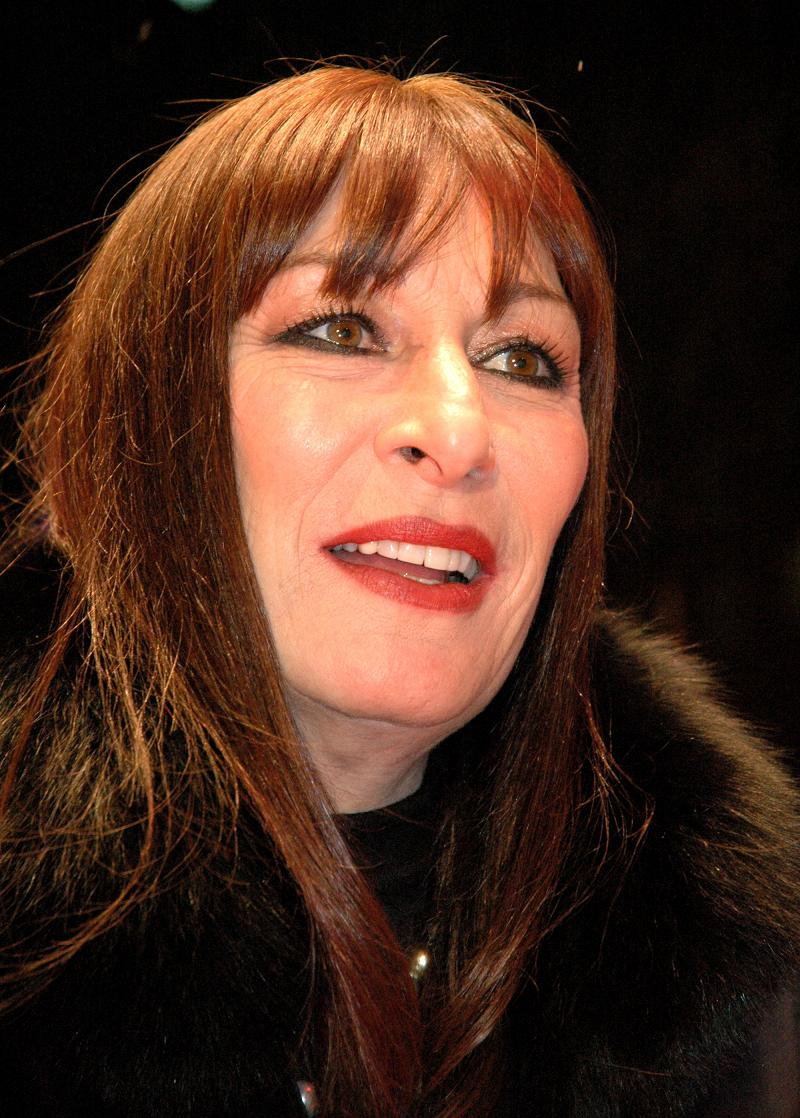
Gene Hackman and Anjelica Huston star as Royal and Etheline Tenenbaum.

The Royal Tenenbaums has an ensemble cast, led by Hackman. Alec Baldwin serves as the narrator. The fictional family and performers are:

- Gene Hackman as Royal Tenenbaum, the scrappy, uncaring, patriarch of the Tenenbaum family, who claims that he recently had been diagnosed with cancer
- Anjelica Huston as Etheline Tenenbaum, Royal’s pristine archeologist wife, who is soon to remarry
- Ben Stiller as Chas Tenenbaum, Royal’s financially smart, overprotective first son, whose wife recently had died
- Gwyneth Paltrow as Margot Tenenbaum, Royal’s secretive, rebellious adopted daughter, who writes plays and is a closeted smoker
- Luke Wilson as Richie Tenenbaum, Royal’s younger son, who is a tennis player and is infatuated with Margot
- Kumar Pallana as Pagoda, the family’s trusted valet
- Danny Glover as Henry Sherman, an accountant, who is marrying Etheline
- Owen Wilson as Eli Cash, the Tenenbaum’s next door neighbor and Richie’s best friend, who is a drug-addicted writer
- Bill Murray as Raleigh St. Clair, Margot’s neurotic husband and a neurologist conducting research on Dudley Heisenbergen
- Seymour Cassel as Dusty, a hotel elevator operator and Royal’s friend, who poses as his doctor
- Stephen Lea Sheppard as Dudley Heisenbergen, a young man on whom Raleigh conducts research
- Alec Baldwin as the Narrator
- Grant Rosenmeyer and Jonah Meyerson as Ari and Uzi Tenenbaum, Chas’s sons, who are obsessively overprotected
- Al Thompson as Walter Sherman, Henry’s son
- Andrew Wilson as a farmer and Margot’s biological father.

== Production ==
=== Development ===
A starting point for the story's concept was the divorce of director Wes Anderson's own parents, but the screenplay as developed bears little resemblance to his family events. French director Louis Malle's works, such as his 1971 Murmur of the Heart, were an influence on Anderson. He particularly drew from The Fire Within (1963), in which a suicidal man tries to meet his friends. A line from The Fire Within, translated into English, is said as "I'm going to kill myself tomorrow." Orson Welles's 1942 film The Magnificent Ambersons was also an influence. Anderson acknowledged that he subconsciously may have selected his main set for its reflection of Welles's production.

E. L. Konigsburg's book From the Mixed-Up Files of Mrs. Basil E. Frankweiler, in which young siblings Claudia and Jamie Kincaid run away to live in the Metropolitan Museum of Art in New York, inspired the film's section of Margot and Richie hiding out in a museum. Anderson had read the book as a child, and he said that it long had fascinated him.

J. D. Salinger's characters in the 1961 book Franny and Zooey inspired much of the child-prodigy material. The children of the Glass family in Salinger's work are precocious with an abundance of exceptional talents. Franny and Zooey also features characters wearing distinctive fashions and a character named Tannenbaum. "Tenenbaum" is the surname of an acquaintance of Anderson.

The film Les Enfants Terribles (1950) by Jean-Pierre Melville, partly inspired Richie and Margot's relationship. Other inspirations were a childhood friend of Anderson said to love his sister, and the director's interest in the incest taboo. Anderson acknowledged that revising the story to make Margot an adopted daughter made the relationship more believable. In creating the characters, Anderson and Owen Wilson used neurologist Oliver Sacks as a model for Raleigh. Anderson based the notion of Eli writing Old Custer on the success of Cormac McCarthy's style of storytelling. Wilson and Anderson completed the screenplay in two years, needing an extended period because of the film's complexity.

=== Casting ===
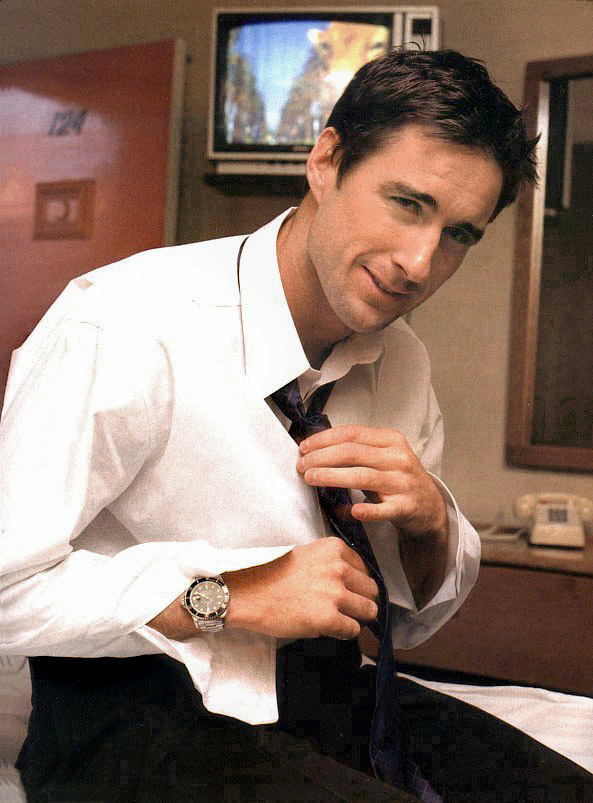
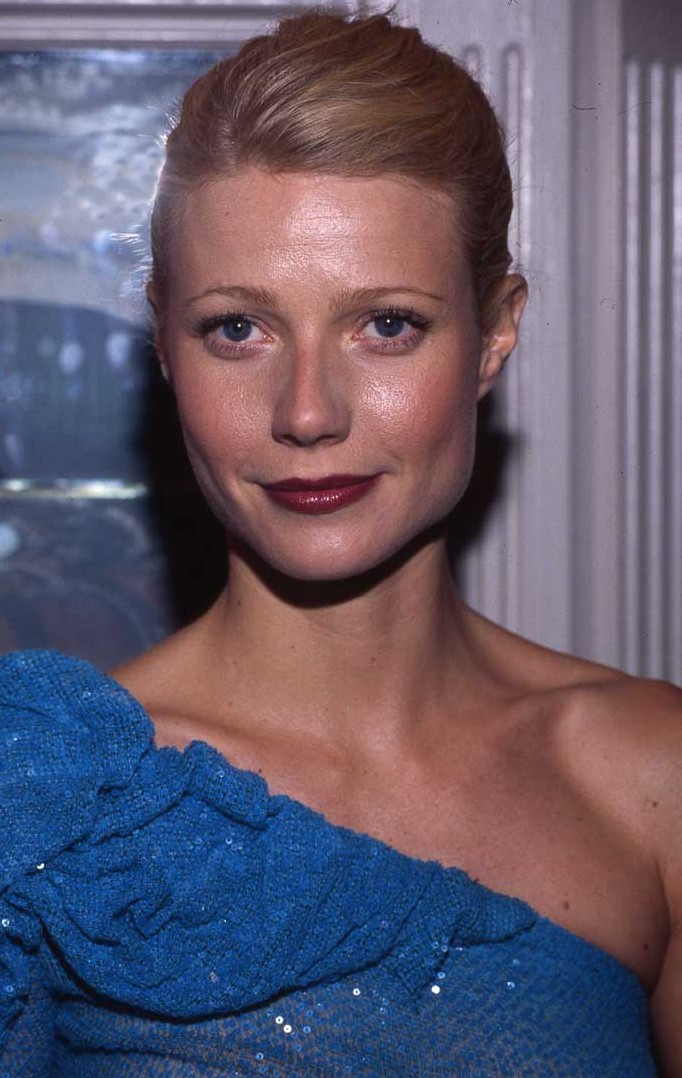
Luke Wilson and Gwyneth Paltrow were cast as Richie and Margot.

Gene Hackman was Anderson's choice for Royal. Anderson said, "It was written for him against his wishes". Hackman was hesitant about accepting the role, citing his lack of understanding of, or commonalities with, Royal. While he delayed, Michael Caine and Dustin Hoffman were considered for the part with Hoffman passing on it, as was Gene Wilder, according to rumor. Ultimately, Hackman's agent persuaded him to take the role. In 2025, Anderson elaborated that "Gene [Hackman] was very annoyed about the money. He was furious. Also, he didn’t want to do the film anyway. I talked him into it — I just didn’t go away … And everybody else said yes to the salary, so Gene just went with it — and that just became our way. He left without saying goodbye. He was grumpy — we had friction... He didn’t enjoy it. I was probably too young and it was annoying to him. He liked [the movie]. But he told me he didn’t understand it when we were shooting." Bill Murray added that "Gene was really rough on Wes and I used to kind of step in there and just try to defend my friend."

Hackman's decision to star made it easier for Anderson to attract a cast of high-profile actors. Because Ben Stiller and Gwyneth Paltrow were each available for only a limited time, the shooting schedule had to be organized around them. Etheline Tenenbaum was written with Anjelica Huston in mind. Following a nadir in his career with Larger Than Life and The Man Who Knew Too Little in the 1990s, Murray had opted to focus on supporting parts in offbeat comedies. He played in Anderson's Rushmore and then The Royal Tenenbaums, and has continued to collaborate with him. Anderson discovered Stephen Lea Sheppard, who played Dudley, through his friend Judd Apatow, as he was acting in Apatow's television series, Freaks and Geeks.

Anderson approached Alec Baldwin to narrate the film but, according to Baldwin, didn't want the film to be narrated and wasn't going to use his voiceover for the finished film. The producers were insisting he use this device. When Baldwin shared this story during the Tribeca Film Festival in 2021, while celebrating the film's 20th anniversary, Anderson replied that he had never rejected the voiceover. Author Matt Zoller Seitz pointed out in his book about Wes Anderson that the screenplay always had the narration element.

=== Filming ===
Around 250 sets were employed during photography. Art director Carl Sprague said that the crew avoided sites that would identify New York City, and even altered street signs. The house used in the film is located at 339 Convent Avenue, near the famous Sugar Hill in the Hamilton Heights section of Harlem in Manhattan.

For his "quintessential New York story", Anderson went location scouting in May 2000, spotted the house and admired what he described as its "storybook quality". The owner, Willie Woods, was planning to remodel it, but agreed to delay the project for six months so principal photography could take place. Anderson said that the film's dalmatian mice that populate the house were created by crew adding spots with a Sharpie marker.

The Waldorf-Astoria was used for the hotel scenes, while Central Park Zoo stood in for a rain forest. A United States Navy training ship represented Richie's ship. The crew added 10,000 square feet of AstroTurf at Forest Hills Stadium to film Richie's tennis match.

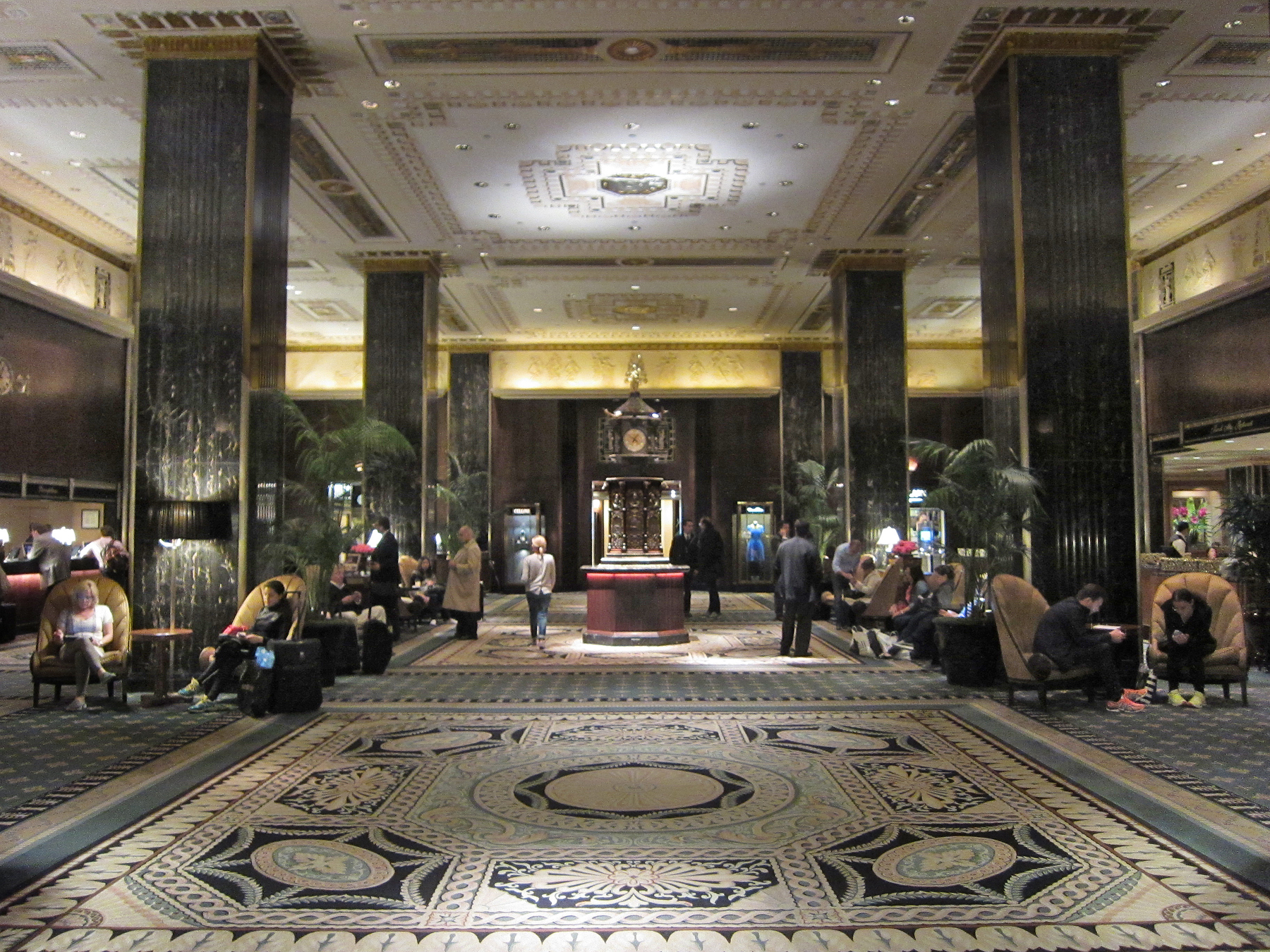
Filming took place at the Waldorf-Astoria.

During production, Anderson gave Huston photographs of his mother, who, like Etheline, was an archaeologist. Huston said, "Wes would send pictures of his mother in aviator jackets or on archaeological digs, and he very specifically wanted me to wear a certain locket. Finally, I asked him, 'Wes, am I playing your mother?'" Anderson replied this was not the case.

Anderson and Huston had a tense relationship with Hackman, who was not always amiable on set. On the first day, Hackman and Huston appeared in a scene together, and Huston had to slap him. Later, she said that the slap was real and "I hit him a really good one. I saw the imprint of my hand on his cheek and I thought, he's going to kill me." During young Margot's birthday scene in the opening scenes, Huston's hair caught fire from a birthday candle. Anderson credited Kumar Pallana with extinguishing the blaze before Huston was seriously injured.

As shooting continued, the bird used for Mordecai was caught by a citizen of New Jersey, who demanded a price for its return. It was replaced instead by one more white in color.

== Themes ==
Journalist Jesse Fox Mayshark wrote that, like the similarly titled The Magnificent Ambersons, Anderson's story follows an older mother considering remarriage, creating a stir in the family. Professor Claire Perkins added that in The Royal Tenenbaums, this tension regarding a possible remarriage has minor class and racial elements, with Chas refusing to call Henry by his first name and Royal calling Henry an "old black buck". Royal also calls Henry "Coltrane" and speaks jive, drawing on racial stereotypes found in media. To The Magnificent Ambersons' family-drama template, Mayshark wrote that Anderson added his "naturally redemptive instincts", stressing "forgiveness" over villainizing the guilty. Royal's "redemption" is a central theme. Professor Carl Plantinga assessed Royal's motives as shifting from "purely selfish" considerations to genuine hopes for reconciliation when he is removed from the home after his false illness is exposed. Perkins observed that, before Royal's death, he had endeared himself to each Tenenbaum in some way. To do this, he had to force his way back into the family's lives as an intruder, professing an intent to "make up for lost time". The prospect of Royal and Etheline rekindling their marriage is largely regarded as impossible, though she weeps at Royal's false terminal illness and Royal inquires about her "love life". In the end, the "ritual community celebration signalling successful social integration" that is a staple of comedy endings comes in the form of Etheline's marriage to Henry rather than a remarriage to Royal, Plantinga wrote.

Academic Donna Kornhaber theorized that, through adultery and pronouncements that "There are no teams", Royal had separated himself from the Tenenbaums; Royal's belief that he is not a Tenenbaum is signaled when he seconds Eli's sentiment that he "always wanted to be a Tenenbaum". However, Kornhaber added that Royal may also view his family members as "external expressions of himself", and this explains why the title refers to them as Royal Tenenbaums.

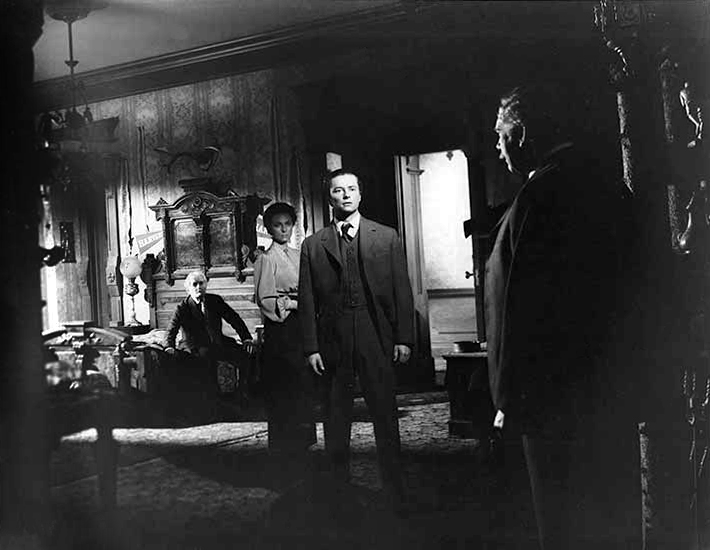
Orson Welles' 1942 film The Magnificent Ambersons influenced the film's themes, with Anderson selecting a main set reminiscent of Welles's production.

Author Mark Browning also identified the dysfunctional family and family happiness as a key theme. Mayshark commented on the depiction of decline after genius, with all the characters being past the peak of their greatness and now being left "sad, individually and collectively". Browning assessed the Tenenbaum sons and daughter as child prodigies, with "clear-cut genius status". Ethel is not negligent as a mother, fostering her children's talents, though, in dispensing money without question, she may have spoiled them.

The children grow up hailed as a "family of geniuses", and, when they face failure in adulthood, they turn to nostalgia, with academic Daniel Cross Turner remarking that the word "nostalgia" literally means returning home in pain. The fact that the Tenenbaums dress alike as children and adults also reveals their nostalgia, and Turner connected Royal's nostalgia with Dudley's fictional Heinsbergen syndrome symptom, an inability to "tell time". Professor Whitney Crothers Dilley considered that confrontation between past reputation and the private reality is what moves Margot not to take the word "genius" lightly, and to deny that she was ever a genius, despite Royal insisting that people called her one. Although the film ends without any of the characters regaining their lost glory, they form new bonds, particularly between Royal and Chas, or realize secret desires, in the case of Richie and Margot.

Film Professor Christopher Robe commented on the loss of loved ones, particularly Royal's parents and Chas's wife Rachael, having an impact on the characters' depression. Royal's mother Helen O'Reilly Tenenbaum is rarely named, but her role in shaping Royal and guiding his behavior is profound, with Robe arguing that this is signified by a shot of Royal under a painting of Helen in a World War II Red Cross outfit. Royal's father is never named, but Royal also misses him; Robe further hypothesized that Chas alienating his sons after Rachael's death shows that family history is repeating itself.

== Style ==
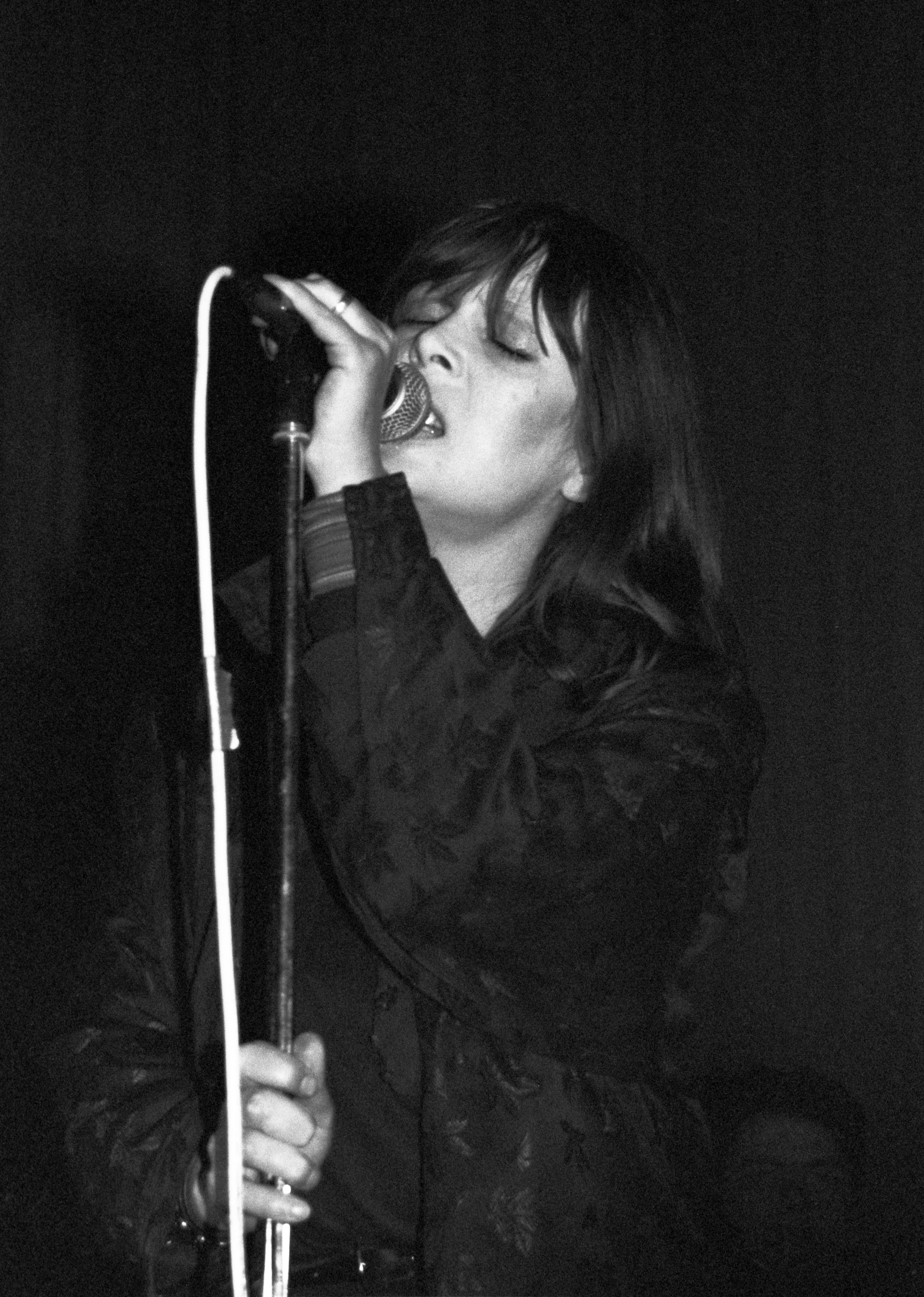
Nico provided a model for Margot's character design.

The storytelling has been described as "absurdist", ironic, and "whimsical". Mayshark wrote that literature shapes the narrative, which is presented as a book with chapters, a prologue and an epilogue. To the chapter-format of the story, Plantinga added that Baldwin's narration gives "exposition" that "should arouse courtesy" in the viewers for the characters. Commenting on the literary framework, Browning detailed how the first scene has the camera looking down on the book being checked out at the library, followed by the tone of J. D. Salinger's study of "disillusionment". Archaic dialogue with the feel of literature ("You've made a cuckold of me") is combined with crass, casual dialogue ("We can swing by her grave, too"). Film scholar Kim Wilkins also characterized lines such as "I'm very sorry for your loss. Your mother was a terribly attractive woman" as "deadpan", "Andersonian", and "unexpected expressions". Ethel also reveals her fondness for Royal's "little expressions", such as "true blue".

Mayshark added the style is "imaginatively visual", with detailed sets and an ambiguous time setting, featuring fashions from the 1960s to the present. Critic Amy Wallace placed it in Anderson's cinematic universe, where "the colors are brighter, the bookshelves are meticulously ordered, the bunk beds aren't just made – they look like you could bounce a silver dollar off them". Professor Dilley identified the setting with the New York City of the 1970s, matching the backdrop style to depictions of the city in the films The French Connection and Midnight Cowboy; this feel is heightened by music popular in the 1970s, by The Rolling Stones and Paul Simon. Dilley argued this depiction of a lost New York is connected to "literary history". Plantinga commented an "illustrative, intentionally artificial tableaux" begins immediately with Baldwin's narration.

Wes Anderson's brother Eric Chase Anderson sketched proposed appearances for the characters before shooting. The character Richie is presented as a tennis star with headbands and armbands, and sunglasses that virtually hide his face, until his "ritualistic" shaving scene reveals him. The appearance of Margot, played by Paltrow, was modeled after singer Nico. Chas, played by Stiller, appears in a red tracksuit, matching him with Ari and Uzi and suggesting "running away from sadness". The young performers playing Royal and Ethel's sons and daughter wear the same costumes as their adult counterparts, evoking "arrested development".

With the cinematography, Wes Anderson enjoyed keeping the camera mobile, providing new perspectives in a single take with no actual cut. Analyst Thomas Caldwell judged the cinematography as unusual, comprising "steady symmetrical medium shots" that help the viewer see the characters' emotional anguish more clearly, particularly in their eyes. Author Gustavo Mercado considered the medium shots a tool to give character and surroundings comparable levels of attention, and to communicate the character's eccentricities and activities. Mercado assessed the scene with Margot smoking in the bathroom to display "carefully chosen lighting, depth of field, wardrobe, body language, and ... composition". The opening credits use "medium close-up" shots with each character looking towards the direction of the camera, contributing to the literary narrative as a "Cast of Characters".

The paintings in Eli's apartment are by Mexican artist Miguel Calderón. Font designer Mark Simonson noted Anderson makes extensive use of typography, in particular Futura and its variation Futura Bold. For characters who are not biologically Tenenbaums, such as Raleigh, other typefaces are used, such as Helvetica on the covers of the character's books.

== Soundtrack ==
1. Lent et douloureux
Erik Satie's "Gymnopédie" is used in the soundtrack. This sample is performed by Robin Alciatore.

Anderson declared The Royal Tenenbaums to be "the most complex, ambitious musical piece I've ever worked on". The soundtrack features rock songs from the 1960s through the 1990s. Songs used include Paul Simon's "Me and Julio Down by the Schoolyard", Van Morrison's "Everyone", John Lennon's "Look at Me", Nick Drake's "Fly", the Mutato Muzika Orchestra version of the Beatles' "Hey Jude", "These Days" by Nico, and two songs by the Rolling Stones. Erik Satie's "Gymnopédie No. 1" is also used in the film, as is "Christmas Time is Here", the iconic song from A Charlie Brown Christmas (1965) by Vince Guaraldi. According to the marketing of the film, particular musical instruments are matched with each character, with the association established in the introductory narration and continuing to the conclusion.

In early test screenings of the film, the end of the movie with the characters leaving the cemetery in slow motion was scored with "I'm Looking Through You" by The Beatles, but, because of the death of George Harrison before release, securing the rights was not pursued. Elliott Smith later recorded a cover of "Hey Jude" by The Beatles for the introduction; however, he was not satisfied with the recording and it ultimately was not used, and the track has not been released. In public screenings held for critics and pre-release audiences days before the scheduled opening, the sequence was scored to "Sloop John B" by The Beach Boys. However, in the final release version, and all subsequent releases on physical media, streaming, and television, the song that closes the film and transitions to the credits is Van Morrison's "Everyone."

There have been two soundtrack album releases for the film, though not all of the songs used in the film appear on the albums.

In 2002, the soundtrack was re-released containing the score, composed by Mark Mothersbaugh, along with more of the songs. The Rolling Stones' songs "She Smiled Sweetly" and "Ruby Tuesday" were omitted for lack of rights.

== Release ==
The film premiered at the New York Film Festival on October 5, 2001, which had previously screened Anderson's Rushmore in 1998. Distributed by Touchstone Pictures, it opened in New York City and Los Angeles in December 2001. In February 2002, it was screened at the 52nd Berlin International Film Festival.

To mark a decade since its debut, Anderson and his stars returned to the New York Film Festival for a screening of The Royal Tenenbaums in fall 2011.

=== Home media ===
The Criterion Collection released the film on DVD following its theatrical run. It released the film on Blu-ray in 2012. It was released on Ultra HD Blu-ray by Criterion on September 30, 2025, as part of the ten film collection The Wes Anderson Archive: Ten Films, Twenty-Five Years.

== Reception ==
=== Box office ===
On its opening weekend, The Royal Tenenbaums made $276,891 in five theaters, or around $55,396 at each venue. By February 2002, it doubled Rushmore's total gross at the U.S. box office.

The film finished its run on June 20, 2002, with a gross of $83,364,010 in North America. It made $19,077,240 in other territories, for a worldwide total of $71,441,250. With the final $71.4 million gross, it remained Anderson's most financially successful film when it returned to the New York Film Festival in 2011. The Grand Budapest Hotel surpassed it in 2014.

=== Critical response ===
On the review aggregator website Rotten Tomatoes, 81% of 210 critics' reviews are positive. The website's consensus reads: "The Royal Tenenbaums is a delightful adult comedy with many quirks and a sense of poignancy. Many critics especially praised Hackman's performance." Metacritic, which uses a weighted average, assigned the film a score of 76 out of 100, based on 34 critics, indicating "generally favorable" reviews. Audiences polled by CinemaScore gave the film an average grade of "C–" on an A+ to F scale.

At its premiere at the New York Film Festival, A.O. Scott wrote in The New York Times that it eventually won him over as charming, and that Hackman brought "quick precision and deep seriousness [that] nearly rescue[d] this movie from its own whimsy". Variety's Todd McCarthy described the film, "As richly conceived as the novel it pretends to be." Richard Schickel of Time wrote, "As with Anderson's Rushmore, there's a certain annoying preciousness to this film—it's not so consistently wise or amusing as he thinks it is—but it has its moments". Roger Ebert awarded it three-and-a-half stars, admiring how viewers can be ambivalent toward the events in the story. The San Francisco Chronicle's Mick LaSalle was enthusiastic, praising the film as "like no other, an epic, depressive comedy, with lots of ironic laughs and a humane and rather sad feeling at its core". Anthony Lane commented in The New Yorker on the setting, which did not truly feel like New York, but "a step-city, or a city-in-law", and said that "the communal oddity" gradually won him over. Peter Travers in Rolling Stone found all the cast great in different ways, while singling out Hackman. L.A. Weekly's Manohla Dargis wrote it had enough laughs to be classified as a comedy, but it contained "a deep vein of melancholia to its drollery". The Guardian's Joe Queenan embraced it as a "bizarre redemption tale".

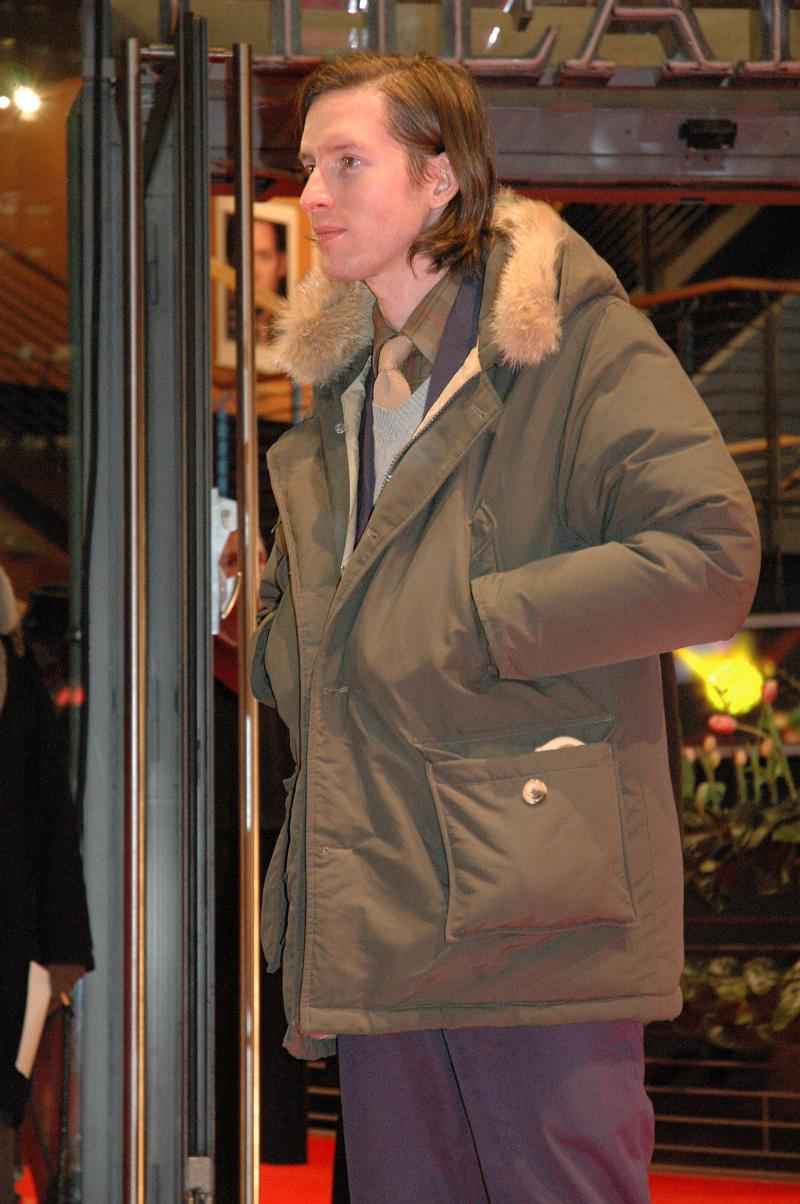
Critics debated the merits of Wes Anderson's style.

Some critics disagreed about the success of the film and its style. New York's Peter Rainer wrote, "Anderson is something of a prodigy himself, and he's riddled with talent, but he hasn't figured out how to be askew and heartfelt at the same time." In the Los Angeles Times, Kenneth Turan assessed the film as indulging too far in Anderson's vision, creating an unknown world. In his 2015 Movie Guide, Leonard Maltin gave it two-and-a-half stars out of four, complimenting the eccentricity, but finding no storyline.

Time listed Royal Tenenbaums in its Top 10 Troubled Genius Films list in 2009, comparing Anderson's characters to Salinger's, in an "ultimately touching package". In 2013, Time also named Henry Sherman as one of 10 memorable accountant characters in film history, citing his decency, success as an author and lack of confidence in his pursuit of Etheline. In 2014, The Huffington Post journalist Lisa Thomson evaluated it as one of Anderson's best films, and that finding laughs in divorce was a highlight. In 2017, Vanity Fair cited Richie's tennis meltdown scene as one of the best tennis scenes in cinema history, making an analogy to Björn Borg.

In 2008, a poll taken by Empire ranked The Royal Tenenbaums as the 159th greatest film ever made. A 2016 poll of international critics assembling BBC's 100 Greatest Films of the 21st Century also voted it one of the 100 greatest motion pictures since 2000. Hackman has received kudos for his performance. In 2015, IndieWire named Royal as Anderson's most memorable character, crediting Hackman for bringing the character beyond the director's norm; the same list also named Margot "the ur-Anderson female" character. In 2021, members of Writers Guild of America West (WGAW) and Writers Guild of America, East (WGAE) ranked its screenplay 14th in WGA’s 101 Greatest Screenplays of the 21st Century (so far). In June 2025, the film ranked number 21 on The New York Times' list of "The 100 Best Movies of the 21st Century" and number 28 on the "Readers' Choice" edition of the list. In July 2025, it ranked number 65 on Rolling Stone's list of "The 100 Best Movies of the 21st Century."

== Accolades ==
The film received a nomination at the 74th Academy Awards for Best Original Screenplay. CNN reported that it had been considered as a possibility for nominations for Best Cinematography, Best Art Direction and Best Actor for Hackman. Hackman did win the Golden Globe for Best Actor in a Musical or Comedy at the 59th Golden Globe Awards, but was unable to accept the award in person.

Award	Date of ceremony	Category	Recipient(s)	Result	Ref(s)
Academy Awards	March 24, 2002	Best Original Screenplay	Wes Anderson and Owen Wilson	Nominated	
American Cinema Editors	February 24, 2002	Best Edited Feature Film – Comedy or Musical	Dylan Tichenor	Nominated	
American Film Institute	January 5, 2002	Featured Actor of the Year – Male – Movies	Gene Hackman	Won	
Art Directors Guild	February 23, 2002	Excellence in Production	David Wasco, Carl Sprague, Adam Scher and Doug Huszti	Nominated	
British Academy Film Awards	February 24, 2002	Best Original Screenplay	Wes Anderson and Owen Wilson	Nominated	
Broadcast Film Critics Association	January 11, 2002	Best Acting Ensemble		Nominated	
Chicago Film Critics Association	February 25, 2002	Best Screenplay	Wes Anderson and Owen Wilson	Nominated	
Chicago Film Critics Association	February 25, 2002	Best Actor	Gene Hackman	Won	
Costume Designers Guild	March 16, 2002	Excellence in Contemporary Film	Karen Patch	Won	
Golden Globes	January 20, 2002	Best Actor – Musical or Comedy	Gene Hackman	Won	
Guldbagge Awards	February 3, 2003	Best Foreign Film	Wes Anderson	Nominated	
National Society of Film Critics	January 4, 2002	Best Actor	Gene Hackman	Won	
New York Film Critics Circle	December 13, 2001	Best Screenplay	Wes Anderson and Owen Wilson	Runner-up	
Satellite Awards	January 19, 2002	Best Motion Picture, Comedy or Musical	Wes Anderson	Nominated	
Satellite Awards	January 19, 2002	Best Actor, Comedy or Musical	Gene Hackman	Nominated	
Satellite Awards	January 19, 2002	Best Supporting Actress, Comedy or Musical	Anjelica Huston	Nominated	
Satellite Awards	January 19, 2002	Best Supporting Actress, Comedy or Musical	Gwyneth Paltrow	Nominated	
Satellite Awards	January 19, 2002	Best Supporting Actor, Comedy or Musical	Ben Stiller	Nominated	
Satellite Awards	January 19, 2002	Best Supporting Actor, Comedy or Musical	Owen Wilson	Nominated	
Toronto Film Critics Association	December 20, 2001	Best Screenplay	Wes Anderson and Owen Wilson	Runner-up	
Toronto Film Critics Association	December 20, 2001	Best Supporting Actress	Gwyneth Paltrow	Runner-up	
Writers Guild of America	March 2, 2002	Best Original Screenplay	Wes Anderson and Owen Wilson	Nominated	
Young Artist Awards	April 7, 2002	Best Supporting Young Actress	Irene Gorovaia	Nominated	
Young Artist Awards	April 7, 2002	Best Young Actor Age Ten or Under	Jonah Meyerson	Nominated	
Young Artist Awards	April 7, 2002	Best Young Actor Age Ten or Under	Grant Rosenmeyer	Nominated	

== Legacy ==
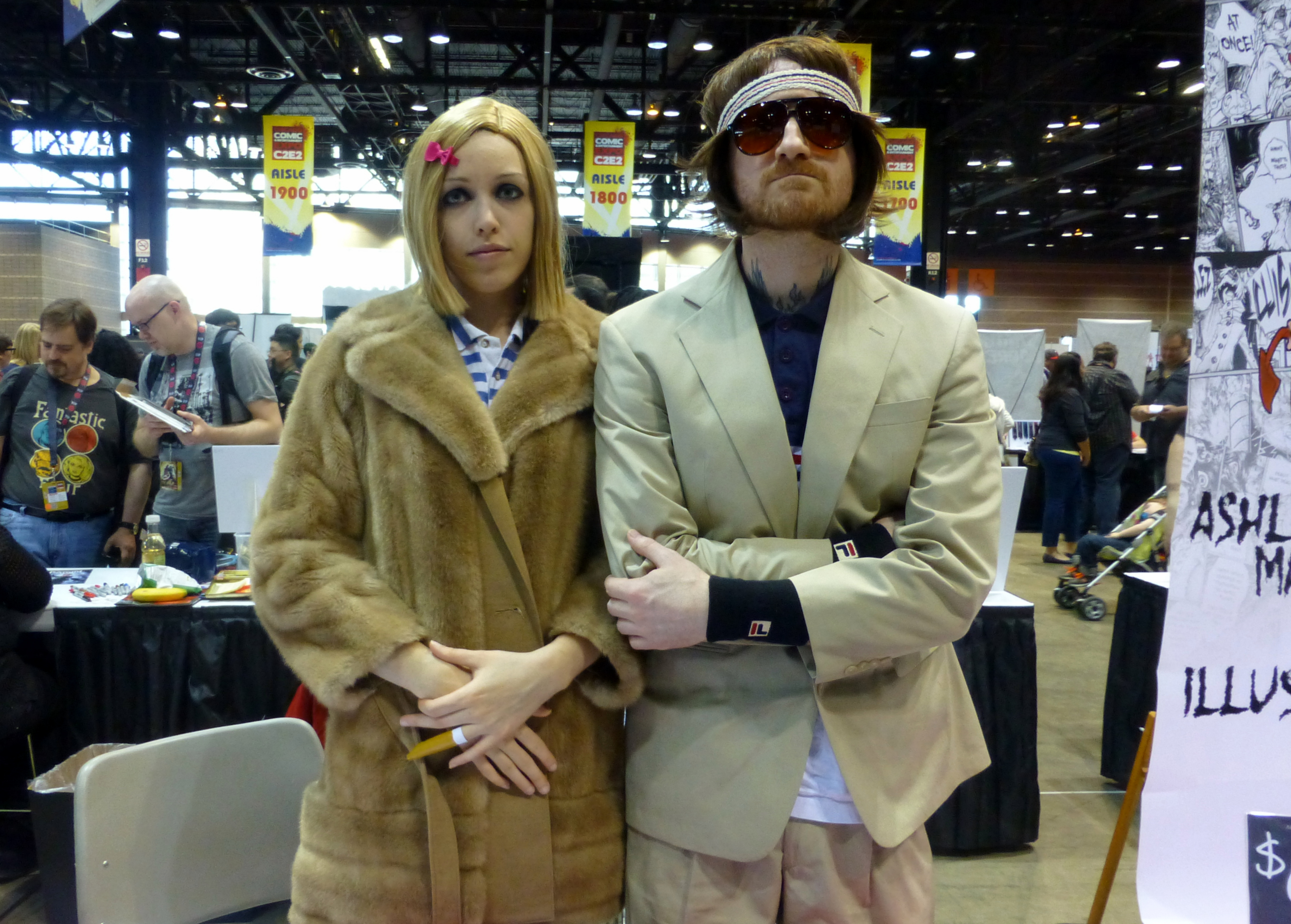
Fans dress as Margot and Richie at the 2014 Chicago Comic & Entertainment Expo.

The narration and the way the film follows each family member was reprised in Fox's critically acclaimed television sitcom Arrested Development. Jason Bateman, who stars on the series as Michael Bluth, describes the show as "The Royal Tenenbaums shot like COPS". Arrested Development creator and head writer Mitchell Hurwitz said that, when he saw The Royal Tenenbaums, he already had the idea for Arrested Development in mind and thought, "Well, that's it, I can't do that anymore", but subsequently changed his mind.

Alec Baldwin, the narrator, has effusively praised the film, including it in his Top 10 Criterion Collection and calling it "arguably one of the most original movies, in tone and style, since Robert Altman's M*A*S*H". He also modeled his performance of the character Jack Donaghy on the television series 30 Rock after Hackman's speech and movements as Royal Tenenbaum.

The Tenenbaums' style has been cited as an influence in fashion design, and Margot Tenenbaum was described by Vogue as the "muse of the season" for Spring/Summer 2015 collections.

Spanish art historian Eugenia Tenenbaum took her pseudonym from the film.

== Bibliography ==
- Browning, Mark (2011). Wes Anderson: Why His Movies Matter. Santa Barbara, California, Denver and Oxford: Praeger. ISBN 978-1-59884-352-1.
- Caldwell, Thomas (2011). Film Analysis Handbook: Essential Guide to Understanding, Analysing and Writing on Film. Insight Publications. ISBN 978-1-920693-77-0.
- Dilley, Whitney Crothers (2017). "The Interplay of Narrative Text, Language and Film: Literary Influence and Intertextuality in The Royal Tenenbaums". Cinema of Wes Anderson: Bringing Nostalgia to Life. Columbia University Press. ISBN 978-0-231-54320-0.
- Donnelly, Kevin J. (2015). Magical Musical Tour: Rock and Pop in Film Soundtracks. Bloomsbury Publishing USA. ISBN 978-1-62892-714-6 – via Google Books.
- Higgins, Gareth (2003). How Movies Helped Save My Soul: Finding Spiritual Fingerprints in Culturally Significant Films. Relevant Media Group. ISBN 978-0-9714576-9-0.
- Konigsburg, E.L. (1998). From the Mixed-Up Files of Mrs. Basil E. Frankweiler. Atheneum Books for Young Readers. ISBN 978-0-689-71181-7.
- Kornhaber, Donna (2017). "The Royal Tenenbaums". Wes Anderson: Contemporary Film Directors. University of Illinois Press. ISBN 978-0-252-09975-5.
- Kunze, Peter C. (2014). "From the Mixed-Up Films of Mr. Wesley W. Anderson: Children's Literature as Intertexts". In Peter C. Kunze (ed.). The Films of Wes Anderson: Critical Essays on an Indiewood Icon. Springer. ISBN 978-1-137-40312-4.
- Maltin, Leonard (2014). Leonard Maltin's 2015 Movie Guide. Penguin. ISBN 978-0-698-18361-2.
- Mayshark, Jesse Fox (2007). Post-pop Cinema: The Search for Meaning in New American Film. Westport, Connecticut and London: Greenwood Publishing Group. ISBN 978-0-275-99080-0.
- Mercado, Gustavo (2013). The Filmmaker's Eye: Learning (and Breaking) the Rules of Cinematic Composition. Taylor & Francis. ISBN 978-1-136-05734-2.
- Perkins, Claire (2012). American Smart Cinema. Edinburgh University Press. ISBN 978-0-7486-5425-3.
- Plantinga, Carl (2009). "Stories and Sympathies". Moving Viewers: American Film and the Spectator's Experience. Berkeley, Los Angeles and London: University of California Press. ISBN 978-0-520-94391-9.
- Pramaggiore, Maria; Wallis, Tom (2005). Film: A Critical Introduction. Laurence King Publishing. ISBN 978-1-85669-442-1.
- Robe, Chris (2012). "Wes Anderson, Entitled Masculinity, and the 'Crisis' of the Patriarch". In Timothy Shary (ed.). Millennial Masculinity: Men in Contemporary American Cinema. Detroit: Wayne State University Press. ISBN 978-0-8143-3844-5.
- Turner, Daniel Cross (2008). "The American Family (Film) in Retro: Nostalgia As Mode in Wes Anderson's The Royal Tenenbaums". In Christina Lee (ed.). Violating Time: History, Memory, and Nostalgia in Cinema. New York: Bloomsbury Publishing USA. ISBN 978-1-4411-4296-2.
- Wilkins, Kim (2014). "Cast of Characters". In Peter C. Kunze (ed.). The Films of Wes Anderson: Critical Essays on an Indiewood Icon. Springer. ISBN 978-1-137-40312-4.
- Winters, Ben (2012). "'It's All Really Happening': Sonic Shaping in the Films of Wes Anderson". In James Eugene Wierzbicki (ed.). Music, Sound and Filmmakers: Sonic Style in Cinema. Routledge. ISBN 978-0-415-89893-5.
