= Rushmore (film) =

1998 film by Wes Anderson

- Theatrical release poster
- Directed by: Wes Anderson
- Written by: Wes Anderson; Owen Wilson
- Produced by: Barry Mendel; Paul Schiff
- Starring: Jason Schwartzman; Olivia Williams; Bill Murray; Brian Cox; Seymour Cassel; Mason Gamble
- Cinematography: Robert Yeoman
- Edited by: David Moritz
- Music by: Mark Mothersbaugh
- Production companies: Touchstone Pictures; American Empirical Pictures
- Distributed by: Buena Vista Pictures Distribution
- Release dates: September 17, 1998 (TIFF); December 11, 1998 (United States)
- Running time: 93 minutes
- Country: United States
- Language: English
- Budget: $9–10 million
- Box office: $17.1–19.1 million

Rushmore is a 1998 American comedy film directed by Wes Anderson about a teenager named Max Fischer (Jason Schwartzman in his film debut), his friendship with rich industrialist Herman Blume (Bill Murray), and their shared affection for elementary school teacher Rosemary Cross (Olivia Williams). The film was co-written by Anderson and Owen Wilson. The soundtrack features multiple songs by bands associated with the British Invasion of the 1960s. Filming began in November 1997 around Houston, Texas, and lasted 50 days, until late January 1998.

While the box office results were modest, the film had a positive reception among film critics. The film helped launch Schwartzman's acting career while establishing a "second career" for Murray as a respected actor in independent cinema. At the 1999 Independent Spirit Awards, Anderson won the Best Director award and Murray won the Best Supporting Male award. Murray also earned a nomination for the Golden Globe Award for Best Supporting Actor – Motion Picture.

After starring in Rushmore, both Murray and Schwartzman became two of Anderson's most frequent collaborators. They have appeared in ten and seven of his subsequent films, respectively. The film was selected for preservation in the United States National Film Registry by the Library of Congress in 2016, deemed "culturally, historically, or aesthetically significant".

== Plot ==
Eccentric 15-year-old scholarship student Max Fischer participates extensively in extracurricular activities at the prestigious Rushmore Academy in Houston, but struggles academically. Max's middle-class background, which contrasts with the wealthy and privileged lives of most Rushmore students, feeds his determination to make his name known. Headmaster Nelson Guggenheim, who strongly dislikes Max, places him on "sudden death academic probation", warning him that if he fails one more class, he will be expelled. At a school assembly, Max meets Herman Blume, a disillusioned parent and local industrialist who despises his twin sons Ronny and Donny, both students at Rushmore. Blume befriends Max and takes him under his wing.

Upon reading an intriguing written message left in a book he read in the library, Max tracks down the book's previous borrower, Rosemary Cross, a widowed first-grade teacher at Rushmore, and soon becomes obsessed with her. Attempting to woo her, he successfully petitions to have the Latin curriculum kept at Rushmore, and later confesses his love for her; she rejects his affection due to their age difference. Rosemary and others, including Max's younger friend Dirk Calloway, are impressed by Max's tenacity, while other students, including the brash and aggressive Magnus Buchan, resent Max's ability to manipulate authority, seemingly on a whim, to the point where the entire school body is affected. Max then attempts to court Rosemary by building an aquarium on the school's baseball field, noting her interest in marine life due to the fish tanks in her classroom and the library book by Jacques Cousteau they had both read, but is stopped by Guggenheim at the ground-breaking ceremony and subsequently expelled from Rushmore for having never sought the school's approval for the project.

Afterward, Max enrolls at Grover Cleveland High School, a local public school. Classmate Margaret Yang shows interest in him, but he ignores her. Eventually, Max begins to settle in and participate in extracurricular activities again, with Rosemary and Blume supporting him. Blume encourages him to give up pursuing Rosemary but eventually becomes attracted to her himself, and they begin to see each other behind Max's back.

Eventually, Dirk discovers the relationship between Rosemary and Blume and informs him as payback for a rumor Max started about his mother. Max confronts Blume, declaring their friendship over, and they soon begin feuding. Max informs Blume's wife of her husband's affair, forcing him to move into a hotel and later releasing bees into Blume's room. Blume retaliates by running over Max's bicycle with his car. Max is eventually arrested for cutting the brake lines on Blume's car. He later attempts to get revenge on Rosemary by taking damaging photos of her and Blume together but learns from Guggenheim that she had already resigned.

Max eventually gives up, meeting Blume at the grave of his mother, Eloise, who died of cancer when Max was seven years old. He explains that revenge no longer matters because even if he wins, Rosemary would still love Blume. Max becomes reclusive and begins to skip school to work at his father, Bert's, barbershop. One day, Dirk stops by the shop to apologize, bringing him a Christmas present. He then reveals to Max that Guggenheim suffered a stroke and suggests he visit him at the hospital, knowing Blume will also be there. Max and a washed-up Blume meet and are courteous. Blume tells him that Rosemary broke up with him because she's still in love with her dead husband Edward Appleby, a former Rushmore student, whose death the previous year directly influenced her decision to teach there. Max eventually returns to school and begins to improve his grades.

Taking his final shot at Rosemary, Max pretends to be injured in a car accident, but she sees through his ruse and rebuffs him again. He then decides to help Blume and Rosemary reconcile, first by inviting her to another aquarium groundbreaking ceremony, but she does not show up. Max then invites both of them to attend his Vietnam War-themed play at Grover Cleveland. The performance touches Blume, himself a Vietnam veteran, and he and Rosemary later appear to reconcile. At the after-play party, Max reveals to Blume and Rosemary that he and Margaret are boyfriend and girlfriend. Max and Rosemary then share a dance together.

== Cast ==
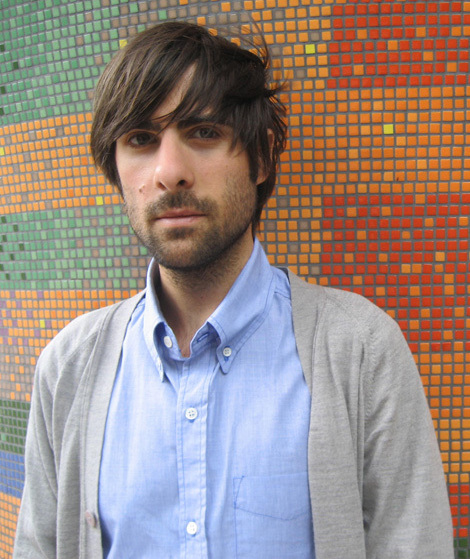
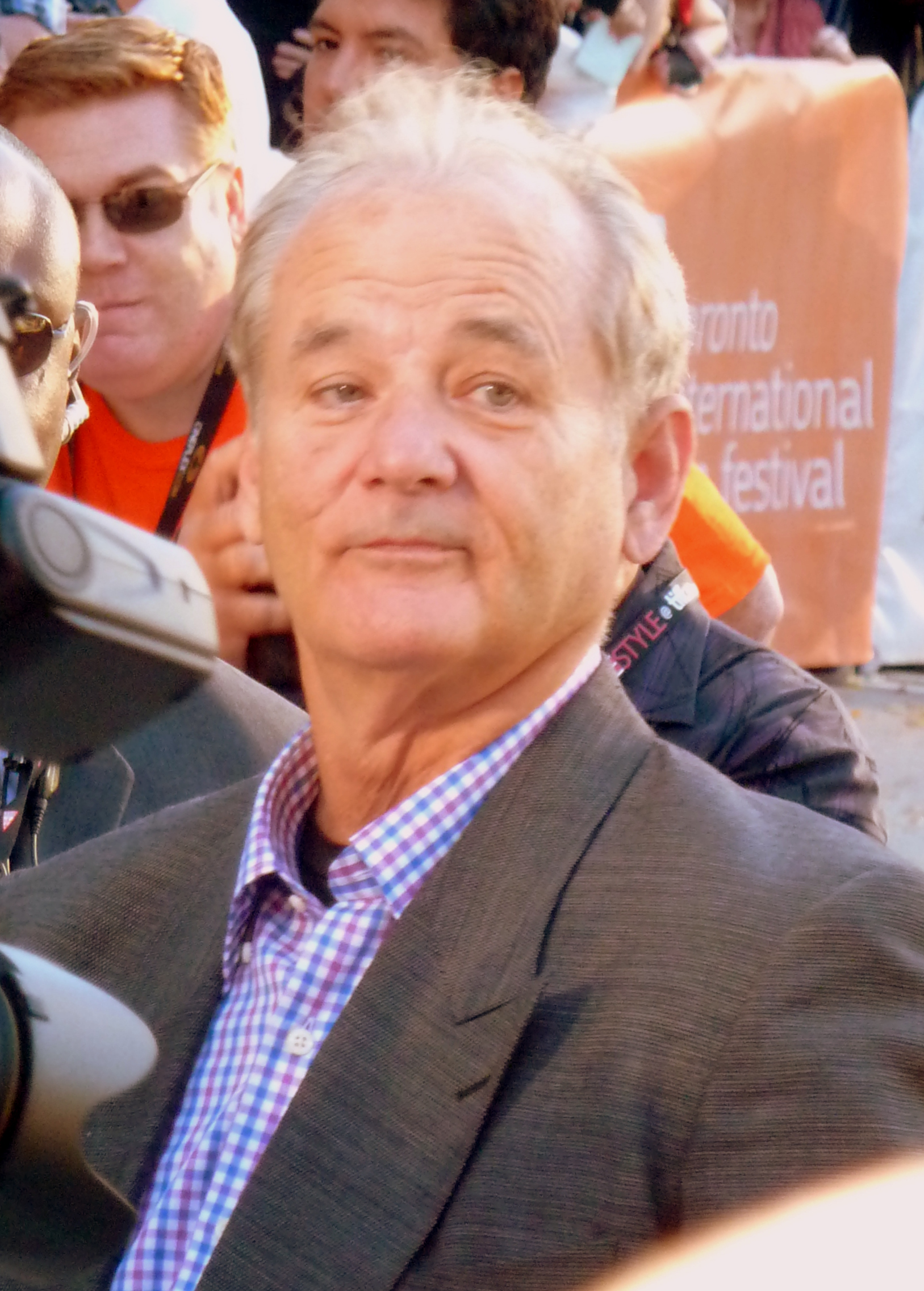
Jason Schwartzman (in 2008) and Bill Murray (in 2012) star as Max and Blume, respectively
- Jason Schwartzman as Max Fischer, a sophisticated, occasionally arrogant teenager who falls in love with Miss Cross.
- Bill Murray as Herman Blume, a lonely industrialist who is also in love with Miss Cross.
- Olivia Williams as Rosemary Cross, a new English first grade teacher at Rushmore.
- Seymour Cassel as Bert Fischer, Max's earnest, kind-hearted father who is a barber.
- Brian Cox as Nelson Guggenheim, the headmaster of Rushmore.
- Mason Gamble as Dirk Calloway, Max's friend whose mother is the subject of a rumor.
- Sara Tanaka as Margaret Yang, Max's love interest and eventual girlfriend at Grover Cleveland High School.
- Connie Nielsen as Mrs. Calloway, Dirk's mother.
- Luke Wilson as Peter Flynn, Rosemary's friend who is passive-aggressively antagonized by Max.
- Stephen McCole as Magnus Buchan, a Scottish student at Rushmore and Max's rival.
- Kumar Pallana as Mr. Littlejeans, the janitor at Rushmore.
- Andrew Wilson as Coach Beck, the baseball coach at Rushmore.
- Marietta Marich as Mrs. Guggenheim, Dr. Guggenheim's wife.
- Alexis Bledel as Student
- Wallace Wolodarsky as the wrestling referee

== Production ==
With Rushmore, Wes Anderson and Owen Wilson wanted to create their own "slightly heightened reality, like a Roald Dahl children's book". Like Max Fischer, Wilson was expelled from his preparatory school, St. Mark’s School of Texas, in the tenth grade. He also shared Max's ambition, lack of academic motivation, and crush on an older woman. Anderson and Wilson began writing the screenplay for Rushmore years before they made Bottle Rocket. They knew that they wanted to make a film set in an elite preparatory school, much like St. Mark's, which Owen had attended along with his two brothers, Andrew and Luke (Luke being the sole graduate), and St. John's School in Houston, Texas which Anderson had attended. The film featured M. B. Lamar High School. According to the director, "One of the things that was most appealing to us was the initial idea of a 15-year-old kid and a 50-year-old man becoming friends and equals". Rushmore was originally going to be made for New Line Cinema but when they could not agree on a budget, Anderson, Wilson and producer Barry Mendel held an auction for the film rights in mid-1997 and struck a deal with Joe Roth, then-chair of Walt Disney Studios. He offered them a $10 million budget. The film was distributed by Touchstone Pictures, and produced by Barry Mendel and Paul Schiff for American Empirical Pictures.

=== Casting ===
Anderson and Wilson wrote the role of Mr. Blume with Bill Murray in mind but doubted they could get the script to him. Murray's agent was a fan of Anderson's first film, Bottle Rocket, and urged Murray to read the script for Rushmore. Murray liked it so much that he agreed to work for scale, which Anderson estimated to be around $9,000. The actor was drawn to Anderson and Wilson's "precise" writing and felt that a lot of the film was about "the struggle to retain civility and kindness in the face of extraordinary pain. And I've felt a lot of that in my life". Anderson created detailed storyboards for each scene but was open to Murray's knack for improvisation.

Cast directors considered 1,800 teenagers from the United States, Canada, and Britain for the role of Max Fischer before finding musician and Coppola family member Jason Schwartzman, the then-drummer of LA rock band Phantom Planet. Macaulay Culkin was considered for the role. In October 1997, approximately a month before principal photography was to begin, a casting director for the film met the seventeen-year-old musician-turned-actor at a party thanks to Schwartzman's cousin, film-maker Sofia Coppola. He came to his audition wearing a preparatory-school blazer and a self-made Rushmore patch. Anderson almost did not make the film when he could not find an actor to play Max but felt that Schwartzman "could retain audience loyalty despite doing all the crummy things Max had to do". Anderson originally pictured Max, physically, as Mick Jagger at age 15, to be played by an actor like Noah Taylor in the Australian film Flirting—"a pale, skinny kid". When Anderson met Schwartzman, he reminded Anderson much more of Dustin Hoffman and decided to go that way with the character. Anderson and Schwartzman spent weeks together talking about the character, working on hand gestures and body language.

Seymour Cassel stars as Bert Fischer, Max's dad. Brian Cox stars as Dr. Nelson Guggenheim, the school's headmaster. Mason Gamble plays Dirk Calloway, Max's friend. Sara Tanaka plays Margaret Yang, the girl who has a crush on Max. Alexis Bledel is an extra as a Grover Cleveland High School student.

=== Principal photography ===
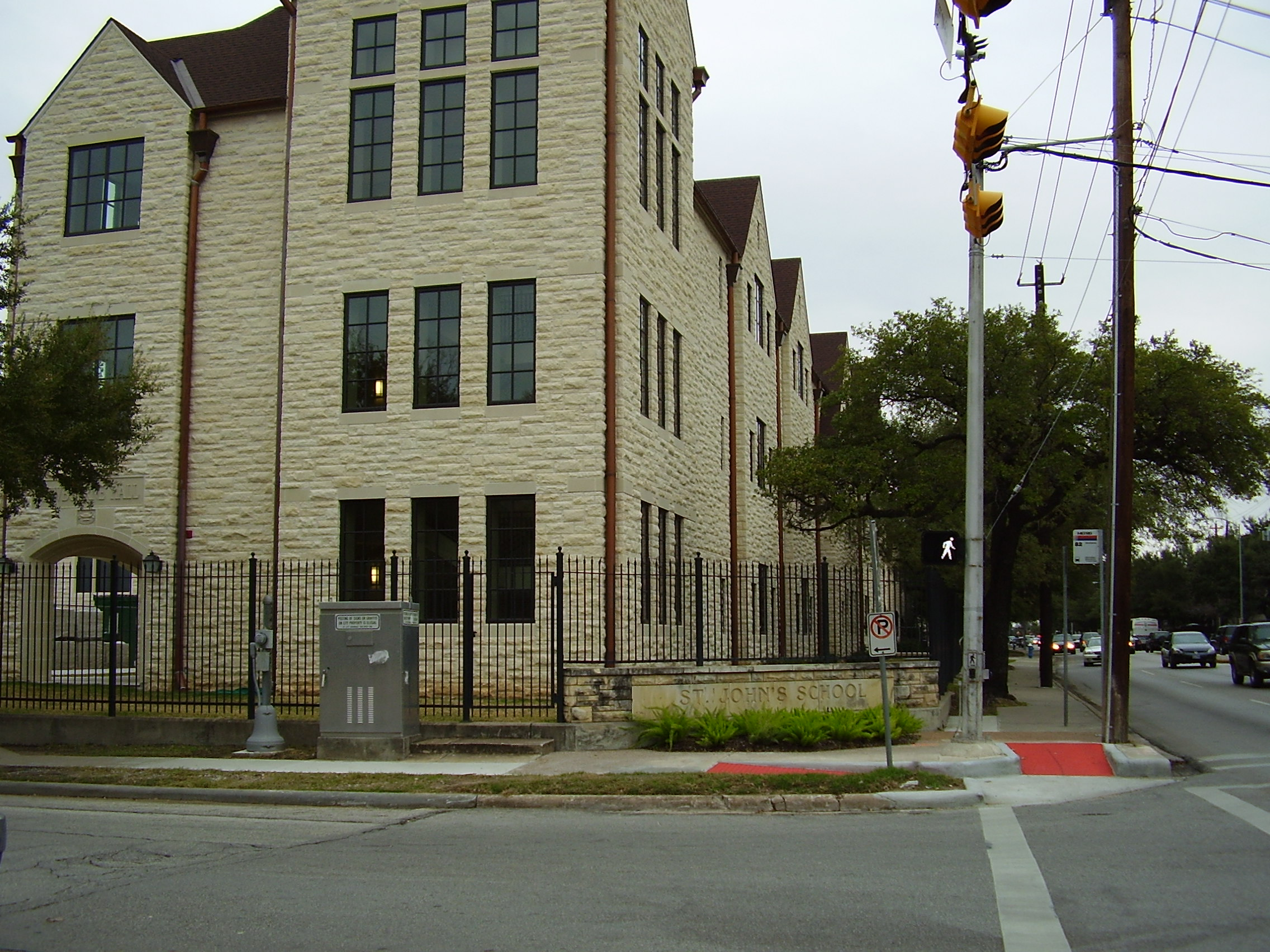
St. John's School was used for the picturesque setting of Rushmore Academy.

Filming began in November 1997 and lasted for 50 days, until late January 1998. On the first day of principal photography, Anderson delivered his directions to Murray in a whisper so that he would not be embarrassed if the actor shot him down. However, the actor publicly deferred to Anderson, hauled equipment, and when Disney denied the director a $75,000 shot of Max and Mr. Blume riding in a helicopter, Murray gave Anderson a blank check to cover the cost, although ultimately, the scene was never shot.

At one point, Anderson toyed with the idea of shooting the private school scenes in England and the public school scenes in Detroit in order to "get the most extreme variation possible," according to the director. Instead, the film was shot in and around Houston, Texas where Anderson grew up. His high school alma mater, St. John's School, was used for the picturesque setting of Rushmore Academy. Lamar High School in Houston was used to depict Grover Cleveland High School, the public school. In real life, the two schools are across the street from each other. Richard Connelly of the Houston Press said that the Lamar building "was ghetto'd up to look like a dilapidated inner-city school." Many scenes were also filmed at North Shore High School. The film's widescreen, slightly theatrical look was influenced by Roman Polanski's Chinatown. Anderson also cites The Graduate and Harold and Maude as cinematic influences on Rushmore.

Initially, the character of Margaret Yang was supposed to have a wooden finger, having been blown off in a science experiment. The idea was abandoned, but later on used in Anderson's The Royal Tenenbaums, where Margot has a wooden finger.

=== Cinematography ===
Rushmore uses the unique style of cinematography that Wes Anderson has become well known for. The film has a singular sense of colour, focusing mainly on blues, greens, and reds in order to create a heightened reality. The montage sequence near the beginning of the film is strongly influenced by the rapid transitions used by French New Wave film-makers. The shot of Max in the go-kart also resembles a photograph by Jacques Henri Lartigue. Disney executives almost cancelled the montage sequence as they did not believe that these short singular shots were necessary due to the film's restrictive budget and time frame. Therefore, the sequence was shot quickly whenever the crew were at a suitable location.

== Themes ==
Anderson confirmed that the protagonist Max is a semi-autobiographical version of himself, including his tendency to write school plays, except that Max is not shy. Anderson has come to be known as an auteur for this distinct style and frequent collaborations with the same actors and production members. Devin Orgeron claims that Anderson's auteurship is interesting in his consistent "cinematic and extracinematic confrontation with the very question of auteurship". In Anderson's films, and especially Rushmore, the protagonist is a "flawed but ultimately redeemable" auteur. However, in both the protagonists' and Anderson's ties to their communities, an idea of "collective auteurship" is proffered.

Mark Olsen writes that Anderson observes his characters chasing "their miniaturist renditions of the American Dream" and that "they embody both sides of William Carlos Williams' famous edict that the pure products of America go crazy".

Deborah J. Thomas argues that Rushmore has a certain level of deliberate artifice. She observes a tension between irony and affect, and the clash "between these aesthetic modes destabilises normative assumptions and expectations in relation to character engagement." For her Anderson uses a "series of strategies in relation to framing, camera angles, shot scales, sound and performance that are designed to unsettle the audience's experience of proximity to, and hence intimacy with, the characters".

In the film, Anderson frequently employs the visual device of a stage, or stage curtains, to present the action. Rachel Joseph speculates that there is a link between these "screened stages" and the theme of mourning, for this "framed theatricality ... parallels the grieving process of reenacting and repeating the traumatic". She also draws a connection between this style of presentation and the "cinema of attractions" that Tom Gunning theorised.

== Soundtrack ==
Rushmore (Original Motion Picture Soundtrack)

Soundtrack album by various artists
- Released: February 2, 1999
- Length: 49:09
- Label: Polygram
- Producer: Mark Mothersbaugh

Professional ratings
Review scores
Source	Rating
AllMusic	3.5/5 stars

Wes Anderson originally intended for the film's soundtrack to be entirely made up of songs by the Kinks, feeling the music suited Max's loud and angry nature and because Max was initially envisioned to be a British exchange student. However, while Anderson listened to a compilation of other British Invasion songs on the set, the soundtrack gradually evolved until only one song by the Kinks remained in the film ("Nothin' in the World Can Stop Me Worryin' 'Bout That Girl"). According to Anderson, "Max always wears a blazer and the British Invasion sounds like music made by guys in blazers, but still rock 'n' roll". In his review for Entertainment Weekly, Rob Brunner gave the soundtrack record an "A−" rating and wrote, "this collection won't make much sense if you haven't seen the movie. But for anyone who left the theater singing along to the Faces' "Ooh La La", it's an essential soundtrack". Anderson also pays homage to the Charles Schulz/Bill Melendez Peanuts television specials, playing "Hark The Herald Angels Sing" from the famous A Charlie Brown Christmas in one of the film's scenes.

=== Track listing ===
1. "Hardest Geometry Problem in the World" – Mark Mothersbaugh
2. "Making Time" – The Creation
3. "Concrete and Clay" – Unit 4 + 2
4. "Nothin' in the World Can Stop Me Worryin' 'Bout That Girl" – The Kinks
5. "Sharp Little Guy" – Mark Mothersbaugh
6. "The Lad With the Silver Button" – Mark Mothersbaugh
7. "A Summer Song" – Chad & Jeremy
8. "Edward Appleby (In Memoriam)" – Mark Mothersbaugh
9. "Here Comes My Baby" – Cat Stevens
10. "A Quick One, While He's Away" – The Who
11. "Snowflake Music" (from Bottle Rocket) – Mark Mothersbaugh
12. "Piranhas Are a Very Tricky Species" – Mark Mothersbaugh
13. "Blinuet" – Zoot Sims
14. "Friends Like You, Who Needs Friends" – Mark Mothersbaugh
15. "Rue St. Vincent" – Yves Montand
16. "Kite Flying Society" – Mark Mothersbaugh
17. "The Wind" – Cat Stevens
18. "Oh Yoko!" – John Lennon
19. ""Ooh La La"" – Faces
20. "Margaret Yang's Theme" – Mark Mothersbaugh

== Release ==
Rushmore had its world premiere at the 1998 Toronto International Film Festival on September 17, and also screened at the 25th Telluride Film Festival where it was one of the few studio films to be screened and be well received by both critics and audiences. The film was also screened at the 1998 New York Film Festival and the Toronto International Film Festival where it was a hit with critics. The film opened in New York City and Los Angeles for one week in December in order to be eligible for the Academy Awards.

=== Home media ===
Buena Vista Home Entertainment released the film on VHS and DVD on June 29, 1999, the DVD with no supplemental material. This was followed by a special edition DVD on January 18, 2000, by the Criterion Collection with remastered picture and sound, along with various bonus features, including an audio commentary by Wes Anderson, Owen Wilson, and Jason Schwartzman, a behind-the-scenes documentary by Eric Chase Anderson, Anderson and Murray being interviewed on The Charlie Rose Show, and theatrical "adaptations" of Armageddon, The Truman Show, and Out of Sight, staged specially for the 1999 MTV Movie Awards by the Max Fischer Players.

A Criterion Collection Blu-ray was released on November 22, 2011. It was released on Ultra HD Blu-ray by Criterion on September 30, 2025, as part of the ten film collection The Wes Anderson Archive: Ten Films, Twenty-Five Years.

== Reception ==
=== Box office ===
Rushmore opened for a week at single theaters in New York City and Los Angeles on December 11, 1998. In one weekend, it earned a combined US$43,666, selling out 18 of 31 showings. The film opened in wide release on February 5, 1999. It expanded from 103 to 830 theaters by March 5, 1999, grossing $2.45 million in its first week. Its domestic total gross was $17,105,219, and its international box office was $1,975,216.

=== Critical response ===
On Rotten Tomatoes the film holds an approval rating of 90% based on 107 reviews and an average rating of 8.1/10. The site's critical consensus reads, "This cult favorite is a quirky coming of age story, with fine, off-kilter performances from Jason Schwartzman and Bill Murray." On Metacritic, the film has a weighted average score of 86 out of 100 based on 32 critics, indicating "universal acclaim". Audiences surveyed by CinemaScore gave the film an average grade of "B" on an A+ to F scale.

In his review for the Daily News, film critic Dave Kehr praised Rushmore as "a magnificent work" and picked it as the best movie of the year. USA Today gave the film three out of four stars and wrote that Bill Murray was "at his off-kilter best". Todd McCarthy, in his review for Variety, admired the film's deep-focus widescreen compositions, and felt that it gave the story "exceptional vividness". In his review for Time, Richard Schickel praised Rushmore as a "delightfully droll comedy", but felt it indulges in itself a little too much. He observed the film brought up "many dark and weighty emotional objects", and tried to conclude them in a "satisfying way".

In her review for the New York Times, Janet Maslin wrote that Anderson is smart enough to avoid turning sentimental, observing how Max "starts off on top of the Rushmore world and experiences a wonderfully welcome comeuppance". In his review for The Independent, Anthony Quinn thought Rushmore was different than all the many "high-school flicks every week", describing it as an "adolescent tragi-comedy, neurotic-romantic triangle" and a "study in loss and loneliness". He praised Schwartzman for playing a character who has not emotionally matured yet, and thought Murray gave an "emotional turnaround" performance. In her review for the Washington Post, Rita Kempley praised Schwartzman's performance for winning "sympathy and a great deal of affection for Max, never mind that he could grow into Sidney Blumenthal". Entertainment Weekly gave Rushmore an "A" rating and opined that Anderson used the 1960s British Invasion hits to "further define Max's adolescent dislocation". Jonathan Rosenbaum, in his review for the Chicago Reader, wrote that Anderson and Wilson do not "share the class snobbery" in much of Salinger's work, but still thought that they "harbor a protective gallantry toward their characters" which is, at the same time, the film's greatest strength and weakness.

In Time Out New York, Andrew Johnston called it one of the year's finest films and thought it reminds him of Harold and Maude but also added that the "complexity of Max and the audacity of the film's set pieces place it in a league of its own." Film critic David Ansen ranked Rushmore the 10th best film of 1998.

Some critics did not review the film as positively. In his review for the Los Angeles Times, Kenneth Turan criticized Max's overtly "snooty" personality as "too off-putting to tolerate", which could potentially discourage audiences when identifying with the film. Film critic Roger Ebert gave the film two-and-a-half stars out of four citing an issue with the film's shift in tone in the final act, stating "the air goes out of the movie" in regards to "stage-setting and character development". He further wrote that the film is torn between being structured like a comedy and having "undertones of darker themes", remarking that he wished the film had "allowed the plot to lead them into those shadows".

A lifelong fan of film critic Pauline Kael, Anderson arranged a private screening of Rushmore for the retired writer. Afterwards, she told him, "I genuinely don't know what to make of this movie". It was a nerve-wracking experience for Anderson but Kael did like the film and told others to see it. Anderson and Jason Schwartzman traveled from Los Angeles to New York City and back on a touring bus to promote the film. The tour started on January 21, 1999, and went through 11 cities in the United States.

== Legacy and accolades ==
Rushmore won two Independent Spirit Awards: Wes Anderson for Best Director, and Bill Murray for Best Supporting Actor. Murray was also nominated in the Best Supporting Actor category for the Golden Globes.

The Los Angeles Film Critics Association named Bill Murray Best Supporting Actor of the year for his performance in Rushmore. Wes Anderson was named the New Generation honoree. The National Society of Film Critics also named Murray as Best Supporting Actor of the year as did the New York Film Critics.

Rushmore is #34 on Bravo's "100 Funniest Movies". The film was also ranked #20 on Entertainment Weekly magazine's "The Cult 25: The Essential Left-Field Movie Hits Since '83" list and ranked it #10 on their Top 25 Modern Romances list. Spin hailed the film as "the best comedy of the year". Empire also named it the 175th greatest film of all time in 2008. Four years later, Slant Magazine ranked Rushmore #22 on its list of the 100 Best Films of the 1990s, and it was ranked the decade's ninth best film in two polls – one for The A.V. Club and the other for Paste. Time Out included it among the 50 best movies of the 1990s, calling it Anderson's "most perfectly imagined film".

ShortList included the film on their list of "The 30 Coolest Films Ever". Ryan Gilbey of The Guardian listed it as the eighth best comedy film ever made. In November 2015, the film was ranked the 39th funniest screenplay by the Writers Guild of America in its list of 101 Funniest Screenplays.

Murray's career experienced a renaissance after the film, and he established himself as an actor in independent film.

In 2016, the film was selected for preservation in the United States National Film Registry by the Library of Congress as being deemed "culturally, historically, or aesthetically significant".

== See also ==
- List of cult films
