= List of accolades received by The Grand Budapest Hotel =

The Grand Budapest Hotel awards and nominations
Awards and nominations
Award	Wins	Nominations
AACTA International Awards	0	3
Academy Awards	4	9
Alliance of Women Film Journalists	1	5
American Cinema Editors Awards	1	1
American Society of Cinematographers Awards	0	1
Art Directors Guild Awards	1	1
Artios Awards	1	1
Austin Film Critics Association Awards	1	1
Belgian Film Critics Association Awards	0	1
Berlin International Film Festival	1	1
British Academy Film Awards	5	11
César Award	0	1
Chicago Film Critics Association Awards	3	8
Costume Designers Guild Awards	1	1
Critics' Choice Movie Awards	3	11
Dallas–Fort Worth Film Critics Association Awards	1	2
David di Donatello Awards	1	1
Detroit Film Critics Society Awards	1	4
Directors Guild of America Awards	0	1
Dublin Film Critics' Circle Awards	1	3
Empire Awards	1	1
Florida Film Critics Circle Awards	3	6
Golden Eagle Award	1	1
Golden Globe Awards	1	4
Golden Reel Awards	0	1
Golden Trailer Awards	1	1
Gotham Awards	0	2
Grammy Awards	1	1
Houston Film Critics Society Awards	2	6
International Film Music Critics Association Awards	4	8
Location Managers Guild Awards	1	1
London Film Critics' Circle Awards	1	5
Los Angeles Film Critics Association Awards	5	5
Nastro d'Argento	1	1
National Society of Film Critics Awards	2	2
New York Film Critics Circle Awards	1	1
Online Film Critics Society Awards	3	6
Producers Guild of America Awards	0	1
San Diego Film Critics Society Awards	1	8
San Francisco Film Critics Circle Awards	1	4
Satellite Awards	2	3
Saturn Awards	0	4
Screen Actors Guild Awards	0	1
St. Louis Film Critics Association Awards	1	9
Toronto Film Critics Association Awards	4	4
Vancouver Film Critics Circle Awards	1	2
Visual Effects Society Awards	0	1
Washington D.C. Area Film Critics Association Awards	1	5
World Soundtrack Awards	1	1
Writers Guild of America Awards	1	1

Totals (Note: Certain award groups do not simply award one winner. They acknowledge several different recipients, have runners-up, and have third place. Since this is a specific recognition and is different from losing an award, runner-up mentions are considered wins in this award tally. For simplification and to avoid errors, each award in this list has been presumed to have had a prior nomination.)
- Wins: 67
- Nominations: 163

The Grand Budapest Hotel is a 2014 comedy-drama film written and directed by Wes Anderson, featuring an ensemble cast. The film stars Ralph Fiennes as a concierge who teams up with one of his employees (Tony Revolori) to prove his innocence after he is framed for murder. Anderson's American Empirical Pictures produced the film in association with Studio Babelsberg, Fox Searchlight Pictures, and Indian Paintbrush's Scott Rudin and Steven Rales. Fox Searchlight supervised the commercial distribution, and The Grand Budapest Hotel's funding was sourced through Indian Paintbrush and German government-funded tax rebates.

The Grand Budapest Hotel premiered in competition at the 64th Berlin International Film Festival on February 6, 2014. Its French theatrical release on February 26 preceded the film's global rollout, followed by releases in Germany, North America, and the United Kingdom on March 6–7. Made on a production budget of $25 million, the film earned $172.9 million worldwide. On the review aggregator website Rotten Tomatoes, The Grand Budapest Hotel holds an approval rating of 92% based on 313 reviews.

The film garnered nine Academy Award nominations, including Best Picture and Best Director (which were won by Birdman, tying The Grand Budapest Hotel for both the most nominations and wins of the ceremony). The Grand Budapest Hotel won the Oscars for Best Costume Design, Best Makeup and Hairstyling, Best Production Design and Best Original Score. The film led in BAFTA nominations, with 11, including Best Actor for Fiennes, Best Director, and Best Film. It won in the same categories as it did at the Oscars, as well as for Best Original Screenplay. The film won Best Motion Picture – Musical or Comedy at the Golden Globe Awards, with three other nominations, and it received a Screen Actors Guild Award nomination for Outstanding Performance by a Cast in a Motion Picture. Alexandre Desplat won Best Score Soundtrack for Visual Media at the 57th Annual Grammy Awards.

== Accolades ==
Award	Date of ceremony	Category	Recipient(s)	Result	Ref.
AACTA International Awards	January 31, 2015	Best Film	The Grand Budapest Hotel	Nominated	
AACTA International Awards	January 31, 2015	Best Direction	Wes Anderson	Nominated	
AACTA International Awards	January 31, 2015	Best Screenplay	Wes Anderson	Nominated	
Academy Awards	February 22, 2015	Best Picture	Wes Anderson, Scott Rudin, Steven Rales, and Jeremy Dawson	Nominated	
Academy Awards	February 22, 2015	Best Director	Wes Anderson	Nominated	
Academy Awards	February 22, 2015	Best Original Screenplay	Wes Anderson and Hugo Guinness	Nominated	
Academy Awards	February 22, 2015	Best Cinematography	Robert Yeoman	Nominated	
Academy Awards	February 22, 2015	Best Costume Design	Milena Canonero	Won	
Academy Awards	February 22, 2015	Best Film Editing	Barney Pilling	Nominated	
Academy Awards	February 22, 2015	Best Makeup and Hairstyling	Frances Hannon and Mark Coulier	Won	
Academy Awards	February 22, 2015	Best Original Score	Alexandre Desplat	Won	
Academy Awards	February 22, 2015	Best Production Design	Production Design: Adam Stockhausen; Set Decoration: Anna Pinnock	Won	
Alliance of Women Film Journalists	January 12, 2015	Best Film	The Grand Budapest Hotel	Nominated	
Alliance of Women Film Journalists	January 12, 2015	Best Director	Wes Anderson	Nominated	
Alliance of Women Film Journalists	January 12, 2015	Best Original Screenplay	Wes Anderson	Nominated	
Alliance of Women Film Journalists	January 12, 2015	Best Film Music or Score	Alexandre Desplat	Nominated	
Alliance of Women Film Journalists	January 12, 2015	Best Ensemble Cast (to casting director)	The Grand Budapest Hotel (tied with Birdman)	Won	
American Cinema Editors Awards	January 30, 2015	Best Edited Feature Film – Comedy or Musical	Barney Pilling	Won	
American Society of Cinematographers Awards	February 15, 2015	Theatrical Motion Picture	Robert Yeoman	Nominated	
Art Directors Guild Awards	January 31, 2015	Excellence in Production Design for a Period Film	Adam Stockhausen	Won	
Artios Awards	January 22, 2015	Studio or Independent Comedy	Douglas Aibel, Jina Jay, and Henry Russell Bergstein	Won	
Austin Film Critics Association Awards	December 17, 2014	Top Ten Films	The Grand Budapest Hotel	3rd Place	
Belgian Film Critics Association Awards	January 10, 2015	Grand Prix	The Grand Budapest Hotel	Nominated	
Berlin International Film Festival	February 15, 2014	Jury Grand Prix	Wes Anderson	Won	
British Academy Film Awards	February 8, 2015	Best Film	The Grand Budapest Hotel	Nominated	
British Academy Film Awards	February 8, 2015	Best Direction	Wes Anderson	Nominated	
British Academy Film Awards	February 8, 2015	Best Original Screenplay	Wes Anderson	Won	
British Academy Film Awards	February 8, 2015	Best Actor in a Leading Role	Ralph Fiennes	Nominated	
British Academy Film Awards	February 8, 2015	Best Film Music	Alexandre Desplat	Won	
British Academy Film Awards	February 8, 2015	Best Cinematography	Robert Yeoman	Nominated	
British Academy Film Awards	February 8, 2015	Best Editing	Barney Pilling	Nominated	
British Academy Film Awards	February 8, 2015	Best Production Design	Adam Stockhausen and Anna Pinnock	Won	
British Academy Film Awards	February 8, 2015	Best Costume Design	Milena Canonero	Won	
British Academy Film Awards	February 8, 2015	Best Makeup and Hair	Frances Hannon	Won	
British Academy Film Awards	February 8, 2015	Best Sound	Wayne Lemmer, Christopher Scarabosio, and Pawel Wdowczak	Nominated	
César Award	February 20, 2015	Best Foreign Film	The Grand Budapest Hotel	Nominated	
Chicago Film Critics Association Awards	15 December 2014	Best Picture	The Grand Budapest Hotel	Nominated	
Chicago Film Critics Association Awards	15 December 2014	Best Director	Wes Anderson	Nominated	
Chicago Film Critics Association Awards	15 December 2014	Best Original Screenplay	Wes Anderson	Won	
Chicago Film Critics Association Awards	15 December 2014	Best Art Direction/Production Design	Adam Stockhausen and Anna Pinnock	Won	
Chicago Film Critics Association Awards	15 December 2014	Best Cinematography	Robert Yeoman	Won	
Chicago Film Critics Association Awards	15 December 2014	Best Editing	Barney Pilling	Nominated	
Chicago Film Critics Association Awards	15 December 2014	Best Original Score	Alexandre Desplat	Nominated	
Chicago Film Critics Association Awards	15 December 2014	Most Promising Performer	Tony Revolori	Nominated	
Costume Designers Guild Awards	February 17, 2015	Excellence in Period Film	Milena Canonero	Won	
Critics' Choice Movie Awards	January 15, 2015	Best Picture	The Grand Budapest Hotel	Nominated	
Critics' Choice Movie Awards	January 15, 2015	Best Director	Wes Anderson	Nominated	
Critics' Choice Movie Awards	January 15, 2015	Best Actor	Ralph Fiennes	Nominated	
Critics' Choice Movie Awards	January 15, 2015	Best Young Actor/Actress	Tony Revolori	Nominated	
Critics' Choice Movie Awards	January 15, 2015	Best Acting Ensemble	The cast of The Grand Budapest Hotel	Nominated	
Critics' Choice Movie Awards	January 15, 2015	Best Original Screenplay	Wes Anderson and Hugo Guinness	Nominated	
Critics' Choice Movie Awards	January 15, 2015	Best Cinematography	Robert Yeoman	Nominated	
Critics' Choice Movie Awards	January 15, 2015	Best Art Direction	Adam Stockhausen (production designer) and Anna Pinnock (set decorator)	Won	
Critics' Choice Movie Awards	January 15, 2015	Best Costume Design	Milena Canonero	Won	
Critics' Choice Movie Awards	January 15, 2015	Best Comedy	The Grand Budapest Hotel	Won	
Critics' Choice Movie Awards	January 15, 2015	Best Actor in a Comedy	Ralph Fiennes	Nominated	
Dallas–Fort Worth Film Critics Association Awards	15 December 2014	Top Ten Films	The Grand Budapest Hotel	5th Place	
Dallas–Fort Worth Film Critics Association Awards	15 December 2014	Best Director	Wes Anderson	Nominated	
David di Donatello Awards	June 10, 2014	Best Foreign Film	The Grand Budapest Hotel	Won	
Detroit Film Critics Society Awards	15 December 2014	Best Film	The Grand Budapest Hotel	Nominated	
Detroit Film Critics Society Awards	15 December 2014	Best Director	Wes Anderson	Nominated	
Detroit Film Critics Society Awards	15 December 2014	Best Ensemble	The Grand Budapest Hotel	Won	
Detroit Film Critics Society Awards	15 December 2014	Best Screenplay	Wes Anderson	Nominated	
Directors Guild of America Award	February 7, 2015	Outstanding Directing – Feature Film	Wes Anderson	Nominated	
Dublin Film Critics' Circle Awards	17 December 2014	Top 10 Films	The Grand Budapest Hotel	6th Place	
Dublin Film Critics' Circle Awards	17 December 2014	Best Director	Wes Anderson	Nominated	
Dublin Film Critics' Circle Awards	17 December 2014	Best Actor	Ralph Fiennes	Nominated	
Empire Awards	March 29, 2015	Best Comedy	The Grand Budapest Hotel	Nominated	
Florida Film Critics Circle Awards	19 December 2014	Best Picture	The Grand Budapest Hotel	Nominated	
Florida Film Critics Circle Awards	19 December 2014	Best Ensemble	The Grand Budapest Hotel	Won	
Florida Film Critics Circle Awards	19 December 2014	Best Director	Wes Anderson	Nominated	
Florida Film Critics Circle Awards	19 December 2014	Best Original Screenplay	Wes Anderson and Hugo Guinness	Won	
Florida Film Critics Circle Awards	19 December 2014	Best Cinematography	Robert Yeoman	Nominated	
Florida Film Critics Circle Awards	19 December 2014	Best Art Direction/Production Design	Adam Stockhausen and Anna Pinnock	Won	
Golden Eagle Award	January 23, 2015	Best Foreign Language Film	The Grand Budapest Hotel	Won	
Golden Globe Awards	January 11, 2015	Best Film – Musical or Comedy	The Grand Budapest Hotel	Won	
Golden Globe Awards	January 11, 2015	Best Director	Wes Anderson	Nominated	
Golden Globe Awards	January 11, 2015	Best Actor – Musical or Comedy	Ralph Fiennes	Nominated	
Golden Globe Awards	January 11, 2015	Best Screenplay	Wes Anderson	Nominated	
Golden Reel Awards	February 15, 2015	Outstanding Achievement in Sound Editing – Dialogue and ADR for Feature Film	Wayne Lemmer and Christopher Scarabosio	Nominated	
Golden Trailer Awards	May 30, 2014	Best Graphics in a TV Spot	"30TV Dynamite"	Won	
Gotham Awards	1 December 2014	Best Feature	The Grand Budapest Hotel	Nominated	
Gotham Awards	1 December 2014	Audience Award	The Grand Budapest Hotel	Nominated	
Grammy Awards	February 8, 2015	Best Score Soundtrack for Visual Media	Alexandre Desplat	Won	
Houston Film Critics Society Awards	10 January 2015	Best Picture	The Grand Budapest Hotel	Nominated	
Houston Film Critics Society Awards	10 January 2015	Best Director	Wes Anderson	Nominated	
Houston Film Critics Society Awards	10 January 2015	Best Screenplay	Wes Anderson and Hugo Guinness	Nominated	
Houston Film Critics Society Awards	10 January 2015	Best Cinematography	Robert Yeoman	Nominated	
Houston Film Critics Society Awards	10 January 2015	Best Original Score	Alexandre Desplat	Won	
Houston Film Critics Society Awards	10 January 2015	Best Poster Design	Annie Atkins	Won	
International Film Music Critics Association Awards	February 19, 2015	Film Score of the Year	Alexandre Desplat	Nominated	
International Film Music Critics Association Awards	February 19, 2015	Best Original Score for a Comedy	Alexandre Desplat	Won	
Location Managers Guild Awards	March 7, 2015	Outstanding Locations in a Period Film	Klaus Darrelmann	Won	
London Film Critics' Circle Awards	18 January 2015	Film of the Year	The Grand Budapest Hotel	Nominated	
London Film Critics' Circle Awards	18 January 2015	Director of the Year	Wes Anderson	Nominated	
London Film Critics' Circle Awards	18 January 2015	Young British Performance of the Year	Saoirse Ronan	Nominated	
London Film Critics' Circle Awards	18 January 2015	Screenwriter of the Year	Wes Anderson	Won	
London Film Critics' Circle Awards	18 January 2015	Technical Achievement Award	Adam Stockhausen (production designer)	Nominated	
Los Angeles Film Critics Association Awards	December 7, 2014	Best Picture	The Grand Budapest Hotel	Runner-up	
Los Angeles Film Critics Association Awards	December 7, 2014	Best Director	Wes Anderson	Runner-up	
Los Angeles Film Critics Association Awards	December 7, 2014	Best Screenplay	Wes Anderson	Won	
Los Angeles Film Critics Association Awards	December 7, 2014	Best Production Design	Adam Stockhausen	Won	
Los Angeles Film Critics Association Awards	December 7, 2014	Best Editing	Barney Pilling	Runner-up	
Nastro d'Argento	June 28, 2014	Best Costume Design	Milena Canonero	Won	
National Society of Film Critics Awards	3 January 2015	Best Actor	Ralph Fiennes	Runner-up	
National Society of Film Critics Awards	3 January 2015	Best Screenplay	Wes Anderson	Won	
New York Film Critics Circle Award	December 1, 2014	Best Screenplay	Wes Anderson	Won	
Online Film Critics Society Awards	15 December 2014	Best Picture	The Grand Budapest Hotel	Won	
Online Film Critics Society Awards	15 December 2014	Best Actor	Ralph Fiennes	Nominated	
Online Film Critics Society Awards	15 December 2014	Best Director	Wes Anderson	Nominated	
Online Film Critics Society Awards	15 December 2014	Best Original Screenplay	Wes Anderson	Won	
Online Film Critics Society Awards	15 December 2014	Best Editing	Barney Pilling	Nominated	
Online Film Critics Society Awards	15 December 2014	Best Cinematography	Robert Yeoman	Won	
Producers Guild of America Awards	24 January 2015	Best Theatrical Motion Picture	Wes Anderson, Scott Rudin, Jeremy Dawson, and Steven Rales	Nominated	
San Diego Film Critics Society Awards	15 December 2014	Best Film	The Grand Budapest Hotel	Nominated	
San Diego Film Critics Society Awards	15 December 2014	Best Director	Wes Anderson	Nominated	
San Diego Film Critics Society Awards	15 December 2014	Best Actor	Ralph Fiennes	Nominated	
San Diego Film Critics Society Awards	15 December 2014	Best Original Screenplay	Wes Anderson	Nominated	
San Diego Film Critics Society Awards	15 December 2014	Best Editing	Barney Pilling	Nominated	
San Diego Film Critics Society Awards	15 December 2014	Best Production Design	Adam Stockhausen and Anna Pinnock	Won	
San Diego Film Critics Society Awards	15 December 2014	Best Score	Alexandre Desplat	Nominated	
San Diego Film Critics Society Awards	15 December 2014	Best Ensemble	The Grand Budapest Hotel	Nominated	
San Francisco Film Critics Circle Awards	14 December 2014	Best Director	Wes Anderson	Nominated	
San Francisco Film Critics Circle Awards	14 December 2014	Best Original Screenplay	Wes Anderson and Hugo Guinness	Nominated	
San Francisco Film Critics Circle Awards	14 December 2014	Best Cinematography	Robert Yeoman	Nominated	
San Francisco Film Critics Circle Awards	14 December 2014	Best Production Design	Adam Stockhausen	Won	
Satellite Awards	February 15, 2015	Best Motion Picture	The Grand Budapest Hotel	Nominated	
Satellite Awards	February 15, 2015	Best Costume Design	Milena Canonero	Won	
Satellite Awards	February 15, 2015	Best Art Direction and Production Design	Adam Stockhausen, Anna Pinnock, and Stephan Gessler	Won	
Saturn Awards	June 25, 2015	Best Fantasy Film	The Grand Budapest Hotel	Nominated	
Saturn Awards	June 25, 2015	Best Writing	Wes Anderson	Nominated	
Saturn Awards	June 25, 2015	Best Performance by a Younger Actor	Tony Revolori	Nominated	
Saturn Awards	June 25, 2015	Best Production Design	Adam Stockhausen	Nominated	
Screen Actors Guild Awards	January 25, 2015	Outstanding Performance by a Cast in a Motion Picture	F. Murray Abraham, Mathieu Amalric, Adrien Brody, Willem Dafoe, Ralph Fiennes, Jeff Goldblum, Harvey Keitel, Jude Law, Bill Murray, Edward Norton, Tony Revolori, Saoirse Ronan, Jason Schwartzman, Léa Seydoux, Tilda Swinton, Tom Wilkinson, and Owen Wilson	Nominated	
St. Louis Film Critics Association Awards	December 15, 2014	Best Film	The Grand Budapest Hotel	Nominated	
St. Louis Film Critics Association Awards	December 15, 2014	Best Director	Wes Anderson	Nominated	
St. Louis Film Critics Association Awards	December 15, 2014	Best Supporting Actor	Tony Revolori	Nominated	
St. Louis Film Critics Association Awards	December 15, 2014	Best Art Direction	The Grand Budapest Hotel	Won	
St. Louis Film Critics Association Awards	December 15, 2014	Best Cinematography	Robert Yeoman	Nominated	
St. Louis Film Critics Association Awards	December 15, 2014	Best Music Score	Alexandre Desplat	Nominated	
St. Louis Film Critics Association Awards	December 15, 2014	Best Visual Effects	The Grand Budapest Hotel	Nominated	
St. Louis Film Critics Association Awards	December 15, 2014	Best Comedy	The Grand Budapest Hotel	Nominated	
St. Louis Film Critics Association Awards	December 15, 2014	Best Arthouse	The Grand Budapest Hotel	Nominated	
Toronto Film Critics Association Awards	14 December 2014	Best Screenplay	Wes Anderson	Won	
Toronto Film Critics Association Awards	14 December 2014	Best Film	The Grand Budapest Hotel	2nd Place	
Toronto Film Critics Association Awards	14 December 2014	Best Director	Wes Anderson	3rd Place	
Toronto Film Critics Association Awards	14 December 2014	Best Actor	Ralph Fiennes	3rd Place	
Vancouver Film Critics Circle Awards	5 January 2015	Best Director	Wes Anderson	Nominated	
Vancouver Film Critics Circle Awards	5 January 2015	Best Screenplay	Wes Anderson	Won	
Visual Effects Society Awards	4 February 2015	Outstanding Supporting Visual Effects in a Photoreal/Live Action Feature Motion Picture	Gabriel Sanchez, Jenny Foster, Simon Weisse, Jan Burda	Nominated	
Washington D.C. Area Film Critics Association Awards	8 December 2014	Best Acting Ensemble	The cast of The Grand Budapest Hotel	Nominated	
Washington D.C. Area Film Critics Association Awards	8 December 2014	Best Youth Performance	Tony Revolori	Nominated	
Washington D.C. Area Film Critics Association Awards	8 December 2014	Best Original Screenplay	Wes Anderson	Nominated	
Washington D.C. Area Film Critics Association Awards	8 December 2014	Best Art Direction	Adam Stockhausen (production designer) and Anna Pinnock (set decorator)	Won	
Washington D.C. Area Film Critics Association Awards	8 December 2014	Best Cinematography	Robert Yeoman	Nominated	
World Soundtrack Awards	October 25, 2014	Best Original Score of the Year	Alexandre Desplat	Won	
Writers Guild of America Awards	14 February 2015	Best Original Screenplay	Wes Anderson (screenplay); Wes Anderson and Hugo Guinness (story)	Won	
