= Wishin' and Hopin' (film) =

- Directed by: Colin Theys
- Written by: John Doolan
- Starring: Wyatt Ralff; Quinn McColgan; Danny Nucci; Molly Ringwald; Cheri Oteri; Blanche Baker; Camila Banus; Shawn Ervin; Sosie Bacon; Siobhan Cohen; Krysta Rodriguez; Jesse James; Deborah Puette; Conchata Ferrell; Annabella Sciorra; Meat Loaf; Chevy Chase
- Cinematography: Catherine Goldschmidt
- Music by: Matthew Llewellyn
- Distributed by: Synthetic Cineyma International
- Release date: November 23, 2014
- Country: United States
- Language: English

Wishin' and Hopin' is a 2014 American coming of age comedy film starring Wyatt Ralff, Molly Ringwald, Chevy Chase and Annabella Sciorra based on the 2009 novel Wishin' and Hopin': A Christmas Story by Wally Lamb. Filmed in and around Norwich, Connecticut, and Willimantic, CT. film received a limited theatrical release at the Garde Arts Center on November 23, 2014 and premiered on Lifetime on December 6, 2014. It was the final television film appearance of Meat Loaf before his death in January 2022.

== Plot summary ==
Fifth-grader Felix Funicello (Ralff), the cousin of famous Mickey Mouse Club Mousekteer and teen idol/movie actress Annette Funicello, lives in the fictional small town of Three Rivers, Connecticut. In 1964, he and his classmates at St. Aloyius Gonzaga Parochial School have a momentous fall semester after lay substitute teacher Madame Frechette (Ringwald) and Zhenya (Cohen), a new student from Russia, arrive. Madame Frechette implements a new concept for the school's Christmas pageant and competition for key roles ensues. The story is narrated in the present day by Felix as an adult (Chase).

== Cast ==
- Wyatt Ralff as Felix Funicello, the distant cousin of Annette
  - Chevy Chase as Narrator, voice of Adult Felix
- Quinn McColgan as Rosalie Twerski, Felix's love interest
- Danny Nucci as Pop Funicello, Felix's father
- Molly Ringwald as Madame Marguerite Frechette
- Cheri Oteri as Sister Dymphna
- Blanche Baker as Mother Filomena
- Camila Banus as Simone Funicello, Felix's first older sister
- Conchata Ferrell as Sister Agrippina
- Annabella Sciorra as Ma Funicello, Felix's mother
- Meat Loaf as Monsignor Muldoon
- Shawn Ervin as Lonny Flood, Felix's best friend
- Sosie Bacon as Frances Funicello, Felix's second older sister
- Siobhan Cohen as Zhenya Kabakova, Lonny's love interest
- Krysta Rodriguez as Annette Funicello
- Jesse James as Chino
- Deborah Puette as Ms. Twerski, Rosalie's mother
- Ken Lamothe as Schoolbus Driver
- Brianna Denski as Jackie Durham

== See also ==
- List of Christmas films
