= Valeria Vereau =

Spanish actress and producer

- Born: Valeria Vereau; 9 December 1986 (age 39); Lima, Peru
- Citizenship: Canada; Spain
- Occupations: Actress, producer
- Known for: Roles of Sonia in The Interceptor BBC One and Emma in Extinction

Valeria Vereau (born 9 December 1986) is a Peruvian-born Spanish actress and producer.

== Biography ==
Vereau was born in Lima, Peru on 9 December 1986. She is the youngest of three siblings. Her mother who is Peruvian, is of English and Spanish-French descent, and her father, is of French and Spanish descent. When Valeria was two years of age her family moved to Toronto, Ontario, Canada. Nine years later, the entire family moved to Madrid, Spain.

After her parents separation in 1999, Valeria and her brother lived with their mother. She began to work at an early age to help her mother pay for costs. At 18 once high school finished, Valeria sign up to one of Spain's most prestigious drama school's Cristina Rota where she trained for three years.

The following years she began modelling and appearing in several commercial campaigns and beauty shoots until her debut on screen with a small role for Pedro Almodovar's film Volver (2006). In 2007, she would collaborate with Julio Medem in Caótica Ana. She has also appeared in several Spanish TV series such as Los Simuladores, Ángel o Demonio, El Fútbol nos vuelve Locos, Homicidios, El Don De Alba among others. She moved to London, England in 2012.

There she landed her first role for the TV series Dark Matters: Twisted But True. She was also cast for several short films and commercials until she scored her first feature film in the Trilogy of David Hare Salting the Battlefield co-starring, Bill Nighy and Judy Davis. Valeria played Emma in the thriller Extinction (2015), alongside Matthew Fox, Jeffrey Donovan and Clara Lago, in an adaptation of Juan de Dios Garduño's bestseller book Y pese a todo. In 2015 she also appeared in the new BBC One drama series The Interceptor, where she plays Sonia the Spanish Interpreter.

== Filmography ==
=== Film ===
Movies
Director	Year	Title	Role
Pedro Almodovar	2006	Volver	Young girl
Julio Medem	2007	Caótica Ana	Indigene
Marcos Changa	2010	Bidones (short film)	Sara
Anna Perris	2010	Atasco (short film)	Woman with red shoes
Alvaro Cea	2010	Una moneda de cambio (short film)	Herself
Enrico Poli	2013	Closure (short film)	Anna
Phillip Berg	2014	Voices (short film)	Lisa
David James Halloway	2014	Maestra (short film)	Sabrina
Louise Marie Cooke	2014	Siren (short film)	Siren
Miguel Ángel Vivas	2015	Extinction	Emma

=== Television ===
TV series
Title	Year	Role	TV Channel
Los Simuladores	2006	herself	Cuatro
Yo soy Bea	2009	Estela Tarragona	Telecinco
Ángel o Demonio	2011	Sarah Muelle	Telecinco
El Fútbol nos vuelve locos	2011	Paula	Online
Homicidios	2011	Rosa Márquez	Telecinco
El Don De Alba	2013	Susana Blanco	Telecinco
El Interceptor	2015	Sonia	BBC One
Rabia	2015	Mica	Cuatro
