= Boy with Apple =

2012 painting by Michael Taylor

- Artist: Michael Taylor
- Year: 2012
- Medium: Oil on canvas
- Subject: Ed Munro

Boy with Apple is a 2012 painting by British artist Michael Taylor. It was commissioned for the 2014 Wes Anderson film The Grand Budapest Hotel, in which it is presented as the work of the fictional Dutch master "Johannes Van Hoytl the Younger". The portrait depicts a boy clad in Renaissance-style garb holding a green apple and pinching its stem. Ed Munro, a dancer from London, was the model for the portrait.

The film describes Boy with Apple as a priceless Renaissance work inherited by Ralph Fiennes' character of Gustave H. as part of the inciting incident.

== Painting ==
Boy with Apple depicts Munro seated in front of a curtain. An inscription identifies him as the "only son of the eleventh duke" (unicus filius ducati undecimi) and gives the date 1627, alongside a forged "J.V.H." signature.

British artist Michael Taylor painted Boy with Apple in 2012 for use in the then-upcoming film The Grand Budapest Hotel. Taylor was contacted by director Wes Anderson, who requested a faux Renaissance-era portrait that would evoke imagery from European art history. Anderson actively added his own input to the work; specifically, he asked that the painting be made along the lines of works by Hans Holbein the Younger and Elder, Bronzino, Lucas Cranach the Elder, and a number of Flemish and Dutch painters.

Due to the painting's role as a film prop, which required that Boy with Apple be carryable under an actor's arm, Taylor was asked to work on a canvas smaller than those to which he was accustomed. Anderson provided a folder of references including "16th century mannerist portraits by Bronzino, some German Northern Renaissance works, photos of castles, cakes, postcards of hotels and so forth". Further instructions from Anderson recommended distinct late-medieval elements alongside a subtle note of visual humor, and Taylor spent three months working on the painting with Munro, having rented space at Hanford School during summer vacation. Munro's clothing was constructed from costumes provided by the institution and Taylor spent much of his time experimenting with the painting's subjects to achieve the desired emotional tone, with discarded elements including a castle setting, a visible curtain rail, and a "rather nice pewter plate with a bird skull". The boy's pinching motion was taken from Gabrielle d'Estrées et une de ses sœurs, a personal fascination of Taylor's, but was later found to serendipitously resemble a pinching hand study by Albrecht Dürer. Taylor concurred with the desire for a Northern character for the work in place of the more Southerly Italian style associated with the period, taking the painting "away from Bronzino and more towards Holbein or Cranach" over the course of development.

Upon the release of The Grand Budapest Hotel, the painting was well received. Art critic Jonathan Jones of The Guardian wrote a full-length analysis of the portrait, stating "Boy with Apple really is priceless, as an art history in-joke." The portrait is currently in the possession of Wes Anderson; this was confirmed in 2021 by an inquiry to Anderson, who stated "I have the picture and always will." A single authentic study for the work, a pencil sketch of Munro, remains in Taylor's possession, though dated a century later to 1727.

== Fictional history ==
Grand Budapest Hotel, set in 1932 in the fictional Eastern European country of Zubrowka, attributes Boy with Apple to the fictional "Johannes Van Hoytl the Younger", who is described as being of the "Czech mannerist, Habsburg high Renaissance, Budapest neo-humanist" style. The painting is dated to 1627, with an infocard in the film describing Van Hoytl as a reclusive, financially unsuccessful, and "extremely unprolific" painter who gained only posthumous appreciation as the creator of "perhaps a dozen" of the period's best portraits, Boy with Apple being the most valuable among them.

The painting is introduced as the prize possession of elderly noblewoman Madame D., who bequeaths it to hotel concierge Gustave shortly before her death, causing a row between Gustave and her son Dmitri. Gustave comments on its sentimental value and claims resemblance to the boy, but resolves to sell it on the black market, stating that even a 1.5% share for his assistant Zero could set someone for life. Zero inherits both the painting and the titular hotel after Gustave's untimely death. The work can be seen hanging unsold in the concierge's cubicle many decades later.
