= Michael Taylor (English artist) =

English artist (b. 1952)

Michael Taylor, sometimes signing as Michael R Taylor (born 1952), is an English artist specialising in figurative oil paintings, still lifes and portraits. His works are held by many public and private collections including four works by the National Portrait Gallery, London.

He was born in Worthing, Sussex, and attended Worthing College of Art (1969-70) and Goldsmiths School of Art (1970-73), where among his teachers were Stephen McKenna and Basil Beattie. He moved to Dorset in 1978.

== Exhibitions and awards ==
Taylor has exhibited inter alia at the Royal Academy,Royal West of England Academy, F.B.A., Hunting Group, Mall Galleries and Morley Gallery, Beaux Arts London, Royal Society of Portrait Painters, London Art Fair and Waterhouse & Dodd, London.

His awards include the National Portrait Gallery John Player Award, subsequently renamed the BP Portrait Award (1983), Millfield Open Art Competition (1989), Changing Faces prize at the Royal Society of Portrait Painters (2002) and the Holburne Portrait Prize at the Holburne Museum of Art in Bath.

== Portraits and commissions ==
Although not primarily a portrait painter, Taylor has painted the guitarist Julian Bream, the crime writer P D James, the musician Andy Sheppard, the former Lord Chancellor, Lord Falconer (commissioned by and for the House of Lords), and the composer John Tavener.

He was commissioned by the director Wes Anderson to paint Boy with Apple, featured in Anderson's film The Grand Budapest Hotel.
