= Extinction (2015 film) =

- Directed by: Miguel Ángel Vivas
- Written by: Alberto Marini; Miguel Ángel Vivas
- Based on: Y pese a todo by Juan de Dios Garduño
- Produced by: Jaume Collet-Serra; Ignacio Fernández-Veiga Feijóo; Brad Luff; Emma Lustres; Borja Pena; Juan Sola
- Starring: Matthew Fox; Jeffrey Donovan; Quinn McColgan
- Cinematography: Josu Inchaustegui
- Edited by: Luis de la Madrid; Jordi López
- Music by: Sergio Moure
- Distributed by: Vertical Entertainment
- Release dates: July 31, 2015 (US); August 14, 2015 (ES); November 12, 2015 (PE)
- Running time: 110 minutes
- Countries: Spain; France; Hungary
- Language: English
- Budget: $8 million
- Box office: $2.3 million

Extinction (formerly known as Welcome to Harmony) is a 2015 post-apocalyptic horror film directed by Miguel Ángel Vivas who also co-wrote the screenplay with Alberto Marini from the novel Y pese a todo by Juan de Dios Garduño. The film stars Matthew Fox, Jeffrey Donovan and Quinn McColgan. In a post-apocalypse future, three survivors confront issues from their past, as well as a race of crazed zombies. The film was released on July 31, 2015, in the United States. It is a joint-production between Spain, Hungary and France.

== Plot ==
After a virus turns people into zombies, a small group of survivors seek refuge in a snow-covered town, believing the virus and all of its monstrous creations had died out. But they only discover the infected had adapted to the environment change, for worse.

Some remaining survivors on two buses are trying to make it to a safe zone. The first bus is attacked by the infected. The people in the second bus, including the main characters (Jack, Patrick, Emma and baby Lu) try to escape. While hiding, Emma is attacked by an infected and bitten.

Nine years later, Jack and Patrick are living separately in houses next door, divided by a fence. Emma has died and Lu, now 9, is living with Jack, whom she calls father. Patrick and Jack do not talk to each other, and Lu is forbidden to leave the premises. However, she bonds with Patrick's dog between the fence.

A few days later, Patrick and his dog come across a half eaten fox. He follows the trail and sees an infected. He tries to get away but hits a fallen tree. The infected looks down on him but doesn't see him. Instead its ears start moving and it is attracted to gun shots coming from Jack's home. Patrick heads home, firing off shots to warn Jack. However, he attracts the infected and it attacks him. He is bitten on the neck but his dog saves him when Jack hesitates to shoot.

Lu is upset that Jack didn't do anything to help. That night, Lu sneaks out of the house to put flowers on the dog's grave. She is attacked by the infected but Jack gets to her in time. He is severely injured by the zombie. Patrick saves Jack and Lu, and ties up the infected. They learn that even though they were technically infected, they are immune to the disease because none of them turned. They also learn that the infected have evolved: they can't see but they have enhanced hearing.

The next day, Lu wants to invite Patrick over for dinner and Jack agrees. Patrick talks on the radio and someone responds, prompting Patrick to want to leave. It is revealed that Patrick is Lu's biological father. She was taken away by Jack because Patrick became an alcoholic and when Emma was attacked and killed, Patrick didn't save her. Jack asks if they can join him and he agrees. They go to the warehouse to pick up supplies and Lu sees a woman in the distance. The guys take her home, realizing she is pregnant. She tells them that her group had heard Patrick on the radio and were on their way. However, their convoy got attacked. At this moment she hears the howling of an infected they had caught. She shoots it with Patrick's gun and tells them the howling is how they call each other.

They start to board up the house when they hear howling in the distance. Many infected come to the house and start to attack. Fighting ensues; the woman plays music loudly, causing the infected to stop attacking and cover their ears, but the generator starts to run out of gas, causing the music to turn down. Patrick makes a decision to sacrifice himself by luring the infected away from the house. Lighting a flare, he hollers to the infected and they follow. Jack, Lu and the woman drive away as Patrick blows himself up along with the infected. Jack, Lu and the woman leave town and watch the sunrise.

== Cast ==
- Matthew Fox as Patrick
- Jeffrey Donovan as Jack
- Quinn McColgan as Lu
- Valeria Vereau as Emma
- Alex Hafner as Lewinsky
- Clara Lago as Anne

== Production ==
The film was first announced on December 20, 2013, as an Ombra Films production, with Jaume Collet-Sera and Miguel Ángel Vivas as producers. Filming began in Budapest and the first images were released on February 21, 2014.

== Reception ==
On Rotten Tomatoes, the film has a 18% rating, with an average score of 5.1/10, based on 11 critics. The website’s consensus reads: "Extinction has a few intriguing ideas, but they -- and some game performances from its talented stars -- are lost in the movie's muddled plot and frustrating pacing." Metacritic gives the film a 46 out of 100, sampled from four critics, indicating "mixed or average" reviews.

In the New York Daily News review of "Extinction" by Katherine Pushkar entitled "Zombies on Ice" the critic commented on the relationship between Jack and Patrick: "...The movie spends nearly an hour - too long - establishing the bad blood". Considering the zombies, Pushkar noted: "The zombies have evolved. They can now survive cold but they no longer infect people via flesh wounds. Also, they are blind. These are only problems if you're a zombie purist. At least they still want to tear people apart, and they remain plenty scary. If only they had more screen time". Pushkar concluded: "The films core problems: too little zombie and too much plot. The upside though is McColgan as Lu...clearly someone to watch".

Frank Scheck in "The Extinction Review" for The Hollywood Reporter argued: "If there's one reason to hope for an actual zombie apocalypse, it's that there will at least be no more zombie apocalypse movies."

In his "Extinction Review" for Fangoria, Michael Gingold commented: "As movies about flesh-hungry ghouls have overwhelmed the horror scene...it's refreshing when the occasional film puts the people at a premium. Such a movie is Extinction." He added: "...Vivas wrangles the drama into a quietly gripping survival saga, he and his leads fleshing out the trio of protagonists to empathetic effect." He praised "Pedro De Gaspar and Miguel Riesco's detailed production design" and a final act "...packed with exciting, impactful action". He considered that "Extinction...[is] a zombie movie whose creators have recognized that the subgenre's tropes have been played out, and aimed for something a little different."

== See also ==
- List of Spanish films of 2015
