= The Interceptor =

British drama TV miniseries

- Genre: Drama
- Created by: Tony Saint
- Written by: Tony Saint
- Starring: O. T. Fagbenle; Ewan Stewart; Lorraine Ashbourne; Jo Joyner; Robert Lonsdale; Anna Skellern; Jeany Spark; Trevor Eve; Gary Beadle
- Composer: Paul Thomson
- Country of origin: United Kingdom
- Original language: English
- No. of series: 1
- No. of episodes: 8

Production
- Executive producers: Sarah Brown; Tony Saint
- Producer: Patrick Schweitzer
- Cinematography: Sam McCurdy
- Running time: 60 minutes
- Production company: BBC Drama Productions

Original release
- Network: BBC One; BBC One HD
- Release: 10 June – 29 July 2015

The Interceptor is a British drama television miniseries broadcast on BBC One from 10 June to 29 July 2015. The eight-part serial, written by Tony Saint and produced by BBC Drama Productions, was cancelled after one series. According to star O.T. Fagbenle, the cancellation was a result of station management change.

The series follows a new law enforcement team tasked with hunting down some of Britain's most wanted criminals. The series is inspired by the book of the same name which details the career of former customs agent Cameron Addicott, co-written by Kris Hollington.

== Synopsis ==
Special Agent Marcus "Ash" Ashton (Fagbenle), a HM Revenue and Customs agent and his partner Tommy (Lonsdale) capture a drugs shipper in an operation at London Waterloo station. Whilst his boss is happy with a conviction of 3 kg of cocaine, Ash wants a larger criminal. During the subsequent operation, Tommy is severely injured in a resultant car accident, and Ash is then suspended. Subsequently, approached in a pub by Cartwright (Stewart), the head of top-secret UNIT (Undercover Narcotics Investigation Team), on first entering UNIT's HQ he meets a familiar face, his Customs training officer Valerie (Ashbourne).

== Cast ==
- O. T. Fagbenle as Special Agent Marcus "Ash" Ashton, a UK Customs agent
- Jo Joyner as Lorna Ashton, Ash's wife
- Robert Lonsdale as Tommy, Ash's UK Customs partner and friend
- Ewan Stewart as Jack Cartwright, Head of the UNIT team
- Lorraine Ashbourne as Valerie, ex-UK Customs, a member of the UNIT team
- Anna Skellern as Kim, ex-Met Police Flying Squad, a member of the UNIT team
- Charlie De Melo as Martin, ex-MI6, a member of the UNIT team
- Valeria Vereau as Sonia the Spanish Interpreter
- Jeany Spark as Detective Inspector Gemmill of the Metropolitan Police, Ash's friend
- Trevor Eve as Roach, owner of a legitimate scaffolding business and a noted pillar of society. Head of a criminal organisation that distributes and sells drugs
- Gary Beadle as Docker, apparent owner of an electrical contracting business, and a criminal. Roach's right-hand man
- Lee Boardman as Michael "Xavier" Duffy, the apparent owner of a dry cleaning shop, and a criminal. Manages the street-based drugs distribution chain
- Neal Barry as "Smoke", a criminal and an informant source for Ash
- Paul Kaye as James Gordon "Jago" Dalkin, a criminal and enforcer
- Michael Lindall as Wark, a criminal
- Simon Armstrong as Chief Inspector Stannard. Gemmill's boss, and Cartwright's former colleague/now foe
- Dexter Fletcher as "Scooter", a pill producer and dealer
- Ralph Ineson as "Yorkie", a Leeds born and bred former criminal, having retired from armed robbery
- Ralf Little as Alex, Ash's former school boy best friend, now a minor career criminal
- Jack Roth as Casby, a criminal turned violent enforcer
- Dean Roberts as Ash's dad

== Production ==
The Interceptor was commissioned by Ben Stephenson and Danny Cohen. The executive producer is Sarah Brown and the producer is Patrick Schweitzer. Filming began in London in March 2014, with David Gyasi cast in the lead role, but he left the production after injuring his leg. With OT Fagbenie recast in the lead role, filming re-commenced in April 2014. Part of the filming took place in Gravesend, at Nell's Cafe, which doubled for a cafe called 'Planet Thanet'. with the UNIT base scenes filmed on location in Keybridge House, a decommissioned British Telecom building in Vauxhall. The Interceptor was the first BBC production which purposefully used only electric powered cars behind the camera, using a fleet of five leased Vauxhall Ampera's.

== Background ==
Cameron Addicott is a retired UK customs officer/SOCA agent. Addicott had joined the Alpha Projects Unit, a group of dedicated undercover Customs officers who hunted the UK's most dangerous criminals. Using telephone and electronically tapped data feeds, the Alpha team would then use the resulting intelligence to prevent serious criminals from committing crime, including prevention of murders, stopping large shipments of drugs and other organised crime. After retiring in 2008, Addicott began writing his memoirs, with the first part co-written by Kris Hollington and published by Penguin Books in 2010, titled The Interceptor.

== Reception ==
The series received a universally negative response from critics. It was given 1/5 stars by Michael Hogan who, writing in The Telegraph, said "Fagbenle tried his best to inject some life into the limp script – huffing, puffing, pouting and glowering – but he’s too good for this hokum". Adam Postans writing for the Daily Mirror who wrote "This attempt at a gritty crime drama... is a clichéd mess with appalling dialogue," and Sally Newell writing for The Independent wrote that the "watchable but predictable prime-time cop drama" was like "EastEnders on an adrenalin rush, but this contrived cop show lacks heart."

== Broadcast ==
The series premiered in Australia on 12 August 2015 on BBC First.

== Episodes ==
No. overall	No. in series	Title	Directed by	Written by	Original release date	UK viewers (millions)
1	1	"Episode 1"	Farren Blackburn	Tony Saint	10 June 2015	4.75m
A botched operation leads Customs Officer 'Ash' to join a new undercover law enforcement team, that uses high-tech methods to catch high-level criminals. His knowledge of the street soon proves vital in tackling a major drug gang.
2	2	"Episode 2"	Farren Blackburn	Tony Saint	17 June 2015	3.67m
Tommy is finding the transition to his job with the Unit a difficult one. The team follows every move made by drug dealer Xavier, hoping he will lead them to someone bigger. But when he meets with a rival dealer things go very wrong.
3	3	"Episode 3"	Cilla Ware	Simon Allen	24 June 2015	N/A
The Unit use phone taps to help track a large sum of money in the hope that it will lead them to the 'Mr Big' - but they also lead the team to a family that Ash is determined to protect - despite their illegal activities.
4	4	"Episode 4"	Cilla Ware	Tony Saint	1 July 2015	3.19m
Roach is feeling the pressure and so turns to a new supplier known as The Viking. However, the Unit are already monitoring the terrifying and ruthless Viking. An old friend of Ash puts her life in danger trying to assist him.
5	5	"Episode 5"	Julian Holmes	Tony Saint	8 July 2015	N/A
The unit discovers a link between the gang they have under surveillance and a batch of toxic pills. Phone taps lead Tommy to Paulo, a pizza delivery man being used to courier the dodgy pills for dealer, Scooter.
6	6	"Episode 6"	Julian Holmes	Mark Catley	15 July 2015	N/A
Roach turns to Yorkie, a violent armed robber, to try and solve his cash flow problems. The Unit are disturbed by the info they have on Yorkie but realise that he could prove useful in penetrating the gang and keeping the police off their backs.
7	7	"Episode 7"	Richard Senior	Tony Saint	22 July 2015	N/A
Problems at home and at work are taking their toll on Ash, but he is convinced that 'Mr Big' is up to something. A new player on the scene could lead to a breakthrough while Kim realizes her ex-boyfriend has betrayed her.
8	8	"Episode 8"	Richard Senior	Tony Saint	29 July 2015	N/A
With Roach feeling the pressure from inside and outside of his organization, he becomes convinced that there is a traitor at work. As he attempts to find them, he unleashes an unpleasant surprise for the Unit - leading to a showdown.
