= Quinn McColgan =

American actress (born 2002)

- Born: Quinn Kathleen Kersey McColgan; January 31, 2002 (age 24); Millsboro, Delaware, U.S.
- Occupation: Actress
- Years active: 2010–present
- Known for: Non-Stop (2014); Extinction (2015)

Quinn McColgan (born January 31, 2002) is an American actress from Millsboro, Delaware, who has appeared in five feature films, four TV shows, one TV movie and a short. Her breakthrough role was in the TV mini-series Mildred Pierce as Ray Pierce (the younger daughter of Mildred Pierce, played by Kate Winslet) directed by Todd Haynes, and one of her best known roles was Becca in the Liam Neeson film Non-Stop (2014) directed by Spanish director Jaume Collet-Serra.

== Career ==
Starting her career in commercials, McColgan has moved up to have prominent roles in feature films and television shows. Her performance as Ray Pierce in the TV miniseries Mildred Pierce received a Young Artist Award nomination for 2012. McColgan's acting ability has been praised in The Hollywood Reporter, where Frank Scheck in his review of the feature film Extinction commented "Far better is child actress McColgan, delivering a well-rounded, naturalistic performance. Here's hoping she gets a better movie next time." In the New York Daily News review of Extinction, Katherine Pushkar commented: "... the upside though is McColgan as Lu...clearly someone to watch".

== Filmography ==
- 2010 Nova TV Documentary Series Episode: 37.14 as Performer (Bit Part)
- 2011 Team Umizoomi TV Series Episode: Counting Comet, as Melissa (3rd Billing)
- 2011 Mildred Pierce TV Mini-series, as Moire "Ray" Pierce (5th Billing)
- 2011 Unforgettable TV Series Episode: Up in Flames, as Anna Halsey (minor role)
- 2012 Dark House TV Movie, as Paula (10th Billing)
- 2012 Unburden' Short, as Callie (2nd Billing)
- 2014 Ping Pong Summer Feature Film, (Bit Part)
- 2014 Non-Stop Feature Film, as Becca (13th Billing)
- 2014 Wishin' and Hopin' Feature Film, as Rosalie Twerki (10th Billing)
- 2015 The Blacklist TV Series Episode: The Kenyon Family No.71, as The Child Bride (minor role)
- 2015 Extinction Feature Film, as Lu (3rd Billing)
- 2015 Love the Coopers aka Christmas with the Coopers, Feature Film, as Young Charlotte 12-14yrs old (minor role)
- 2015 Members Only TV Movie, as Mia (minor role)
- 2018 Lucy in the Sky Short, as Rachel (6th Billing)
- 2019 Blue Bloods TV Series Episode: The Real Deal, as Amanda Wallace (guest role)
- 2020 FBI: Most Wanted TV Series Episode: Dopesick, as Cassie Varick (guest role)
- 2021 Project Pay Day Feature Film, as Hannah (starring role)
- 2021 Hide and Seek Feature Film, as Hannah Blackwell
- 2022 Stay Awake Feature Film, as Ashley (5th Billing)
- 2024 Anatomy of a Worm Short, as Cali (lead role)
