= Homicidios =

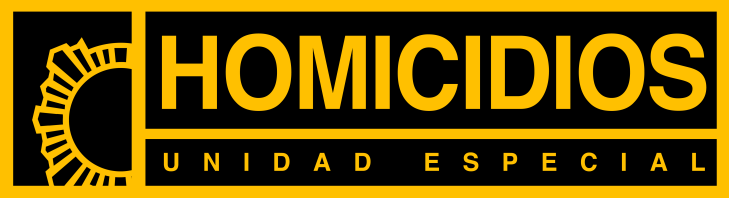
- Genre: Police procedural, drama
- Created by: Miguel Sáez
- Developed by: Mediaset España
- Directed by: Alberto Ruíz Rojo
- Starring: Eduardo Noriega; Celia Freijeiro; Enrique Berrendero; Carlos García Cortázar; Vicky Luengo; Marian Aguilera
- Country of origin: Spain
- Original language: Spanish
- No. of seasons: 1
- No. of episodes: 13

Production
- Executive producer: Mediaset España
- Producer: Big Bang Media

Original release
- Network: Telecinco
- Release: September 20 – December 12, 2011

Homicidios (English: Homicides) is a Spanish police procedural TV series which aired in Telecinco in 2011.

== Plot ==
It tells the story of the members of a unit of the Homicide Unit of the National Police, headed by the Chief Inspector Eva Hernandez, with the help of Thomas Soller, a psychologist specialized in Behavioral Pathologies, they solve complicated cases.

After a series of crimes, pointing to a serial murderer, Thomas and Eva Soller join forces for research. They are symbols of two different views, but complementary, to solve the same case: she embodies traditional research, based on the analysis of physical evidence and the testimony of witnesses and defendants, while intuitive research embodies Soller from the deep human knowledge.

Eva and Soller work on a multidisciplinary research team composed of a criminal inspector tanning in the Anti-Narcotics, Alonso Izquierdo, a disciplined inspector that moves like a fish in water in the Homicide Unit, Pablo Montero, a rookie deputy inspector newly arrival to the unit, María Losada, and a sarcastic forensic that loves her job, Susana Rota, all under the supervision of a commissioner of the old school, Andrés Ramos.

== Cast ==
- Eduardo Noriega as Tomas Sóller
- Celia Freijeiro as Eva Hernández
- Carlos García Cortázar as Alonso Izquierdo
- Enrique Berrendero as Pablo Montero
- Vicky Luengo as María Losada
- Marian Aguilera as Susana Rota
- Esmeralda Moya as Helena Cuevas
- Miguel de Miguel as Carlos García-Aranda
- Mingo Ràfols as Lorenzo Santamaría
- Anna Allen as Patricia Vega
- Mariano Venancio as el comisario Andrés Ramos
- Fernando Soto as Marcelo Salas, "the hunter"
- Valeria Vereau as Rosa Márquez

== Episodes and ratings ==
Air Date	Number	Episode Title	Rating (%)
September 20, 2011	001	«El camino que va de Cork a Dublín»	15.9
September 27, 2011	002	«Sexo, mentiras y cintas de vídeo»	14
October 4, 2011	003	«Gritos en la oscuridad»	12.3
October 11, 2011	004	«Donde viven los monstruos»	10.1
October 18, 2011	005	«Labios azules»	15
October 25, 2011	006	«Origen»	13.6
October 31, 2011	007	«Oscura noche oscura»	12
November 7, 2011	008	«Muerte entre las flores»	13.4
November 14, 2011	009	«Mientras duermes»	12.5
November 21, 2011	010	«Bajo el volcán»	13.2
November 28, 2011	011	«El largo adiós»	13.1
December 5, 2011	012	«La mano derecha ensangrentada»	12.8
December 13, 2011	013	«La noche del cazador»	9.4
