= Görlitz Department Store =

German retail store

Coordinates: 51.1528°N 14.9876°E

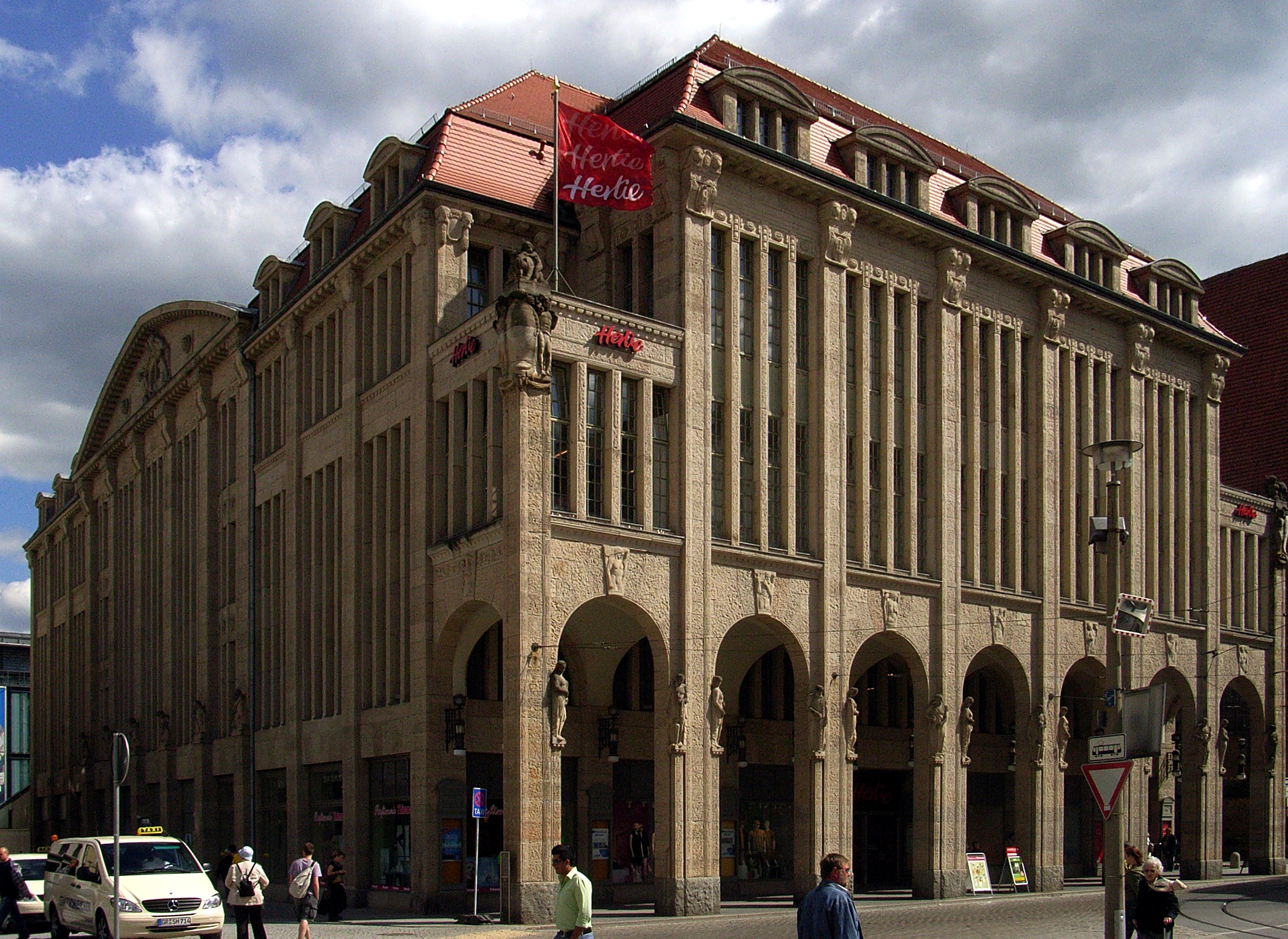
Görlitz department store, 2011

The Görlitz Department Store in Görlitz in the German state of Saxony is one of the best preserved department stores from the beginning of the 20th century. It is built in the Art Nouveau style and was operated as a department store until 15 August 2009. The city and a citizens' action group tried to revitalize the department store, which in 2012 housed only a beauty shop. In 2013, a private investor was found who wanted to operate the facility as a universal department store much like the Department Store of Upper Lusatia (Kaufhaus der Oberlausitz, KaDeO), a counterpart to the Berlin department store Kaufhaus des Westens (KaDeWe).

== History ==
=== Construction ===
Located on the present site in 1717 was the "Goldener Strauß" (Golden Ostrich) inn, which later was expanded into a hotel. The Görlitz city council wanted to have a department store at this location, following the model of the Berlin Wertheim department store on Leipziger Platz. The Potsdam architect Carl Schmanns provided the construction plans for the "department store at the ostrich". In 1912, after the demolition of the hotel, the new construction began as a steel skeleton that received a facade entirely based on the desired model in Art Nouveau. After 9 months of construction, the department store was opened on 30 September 1913. The management of the store was handled by a small firm.

=== 1929 to 2010 ===
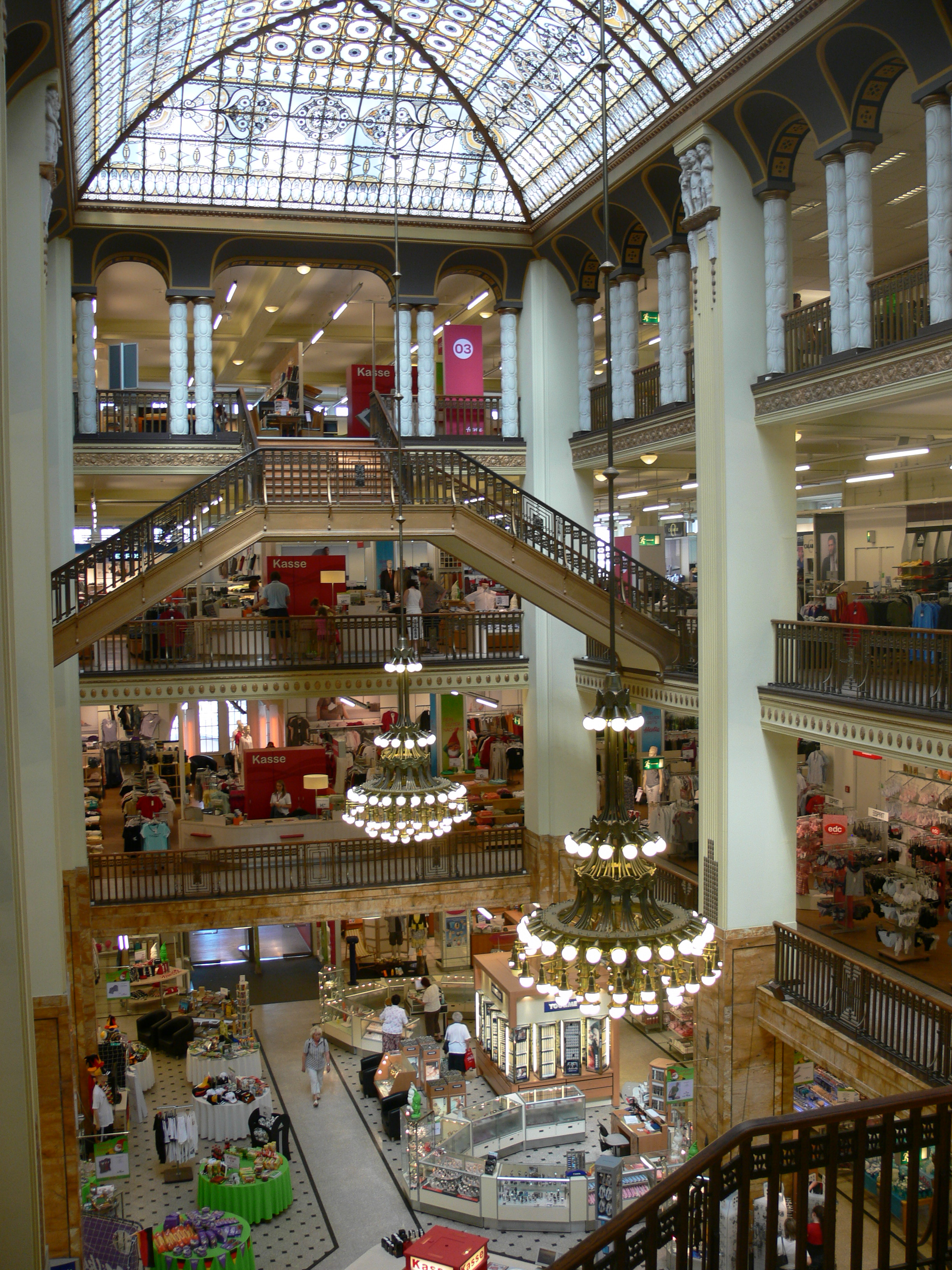
Interior, 2008

In 1929 Rudolph Karstadt AG acquired the department store. The Karstadt owners were ousted after the Second World War, and in 1950 the store was acquired by the German Democratic Republic, which delegated operation to the state Handelsorganisation (HO). In 1958, it became a Centrum department store and consequently was part of an entire chain of department stores in several cities of the GDR. In 1984, HO began the restoration of the historic facade and the interior rooms. After reunification the department store was given back to the Karstadt group. In a subsequent restructuring of the company, it was placed into the Karstadt Kompakt division, which was sold on 1 October 2005 to a British investment group, the Dawnay Day group. On 1 March 2007 these stores received the historical name "Hertie", as did the Görlitz department store. On 20 May 2009 Hertie owner Dawnay Day announced that the store and all other Hertie branches would close by the end of July. The city searched for a new investor for the building. On 3 June 2009 federal chancellor Angela Merkel announced that the department store was released from Hertie's insolvency and was to be individually sold. An investor from Great Britain took it over; however in 2010 it was again abandoned. Thus the historically-listed building closed its doors. At the request of the city, from 8 February 2010 the building was in receivership to solve the problem of its further use quicker. Apart from reopening as a department store, the building's use as a museum was also discussed. The vacant building was repeatedly a victim of vandalism. A citizen's initiative was formed to rescue the department store; however, it struggled to find a solution.

=== Range ===
The department store last sold clothing, candy, furniture, and other types of products except for groceries. Because its proximity to the border with Poland, all the signs were written in both German and Polish, some of the salespeople were fluent in both languages and euros and Polish złoty were both accepted for payment.

== Fresh start ==
In June 2013, Winfried Stöcker acquired the department store, with intentions to operate it as a department store again. The reopening was planned for 2016, then for the fall of 2017, until it became clear that significant restoration and renovation would be necessary first. It is unclear when this would begin, and when a new department store might open in the building. In November 2020 the project was reported to be halted due to a dispute concerning the demolition of two buildings near the store. The owner's plans would demolish the two structures to provide better delivery access to the store and a nearby parking garage. However, the local landmark preservation office ruled that the buildings must be preserved. Stöcker threatened to abandon the entire project if demolition was not allowed to proceed.

== Film set ==
The US film director Wes Anderson searched for a realistic location for the film The Grand Budapest Hotel and came across the Görlitz department store. The open galleries of the atrium floors were filled to resemble corridors, with hotel rooms opening off the atrium. The entire film team, among others the actress Tilda Swinton and the actors Willem Dafoe and Ralph Fiennes, stayed in the neighboring Hotel Börse during the ten weeks of shooting in the beginning of 2013.
