= Stay Awake (film) =

- Directed by: Jamie Sisley
- Written by: Jamie Sisley
- Produced by: Eric Shultz; Shrihari Sathe
- Starring: Wyatt Oleff; Fin Argus; Albert Jones; Cree Cicchino; Quinn McColgan; Chrissy Metz
- Cinematography: Alejandro Mejia
- Edited by: Alan Canant
- Music by: Ben Sollee
- Production companies: MarVista Entertainment; Dialectic; Relic Pictures; Whitewater Films
- Distributed by: MarVista Entertainment
- Release dates: February 12, 2022 (Berlinale); May 19, 2023
- Running time: 94 minutes
- Country: United States
- Language: English

Stay Awake is a 2022 American drama film, written and directed by Jamie Sisley, in his directorial debut. It stars Wyatt Oleff, Fin Argus, Albert Jones, Cree Cicchino, Quinn McColgan and Chrissy Metz. The film had its world premiere at the 72nd Berlin International Film Festival on February 12, 2022, and was released on May 19, 2023, by MarVista Entertainment.

== Plot ==
Two brothers navigate teenage life while dealing with their mother's prescription drug addiction.

== Cast ==
- Wyatt Oleff as Ethan
- Fin Argus as Derek
- Albert Jones as Dennis
- Cree Cicchino as Melanie
- Quinn McColgan as Ashley
- Chrissy Metz as Michelle
- Lorrie Odom as Vicki

== Production ==
In July 2021, it was announced Wyatt Oleff, Fin Argus, Chrissy Metz, Cree Cicchino, Quinn McColgan and Lorrie Odom had joined the cast of the film, with Jamie Sisley directing from a screenplay he wrote.

== Release ==
It had its world premiere at the 72nd Berlin International Film Festival on February 12, 2022, where it received a Special Mention for Best Film and won the German Art House Cinema award.

It also had its world at the 48th Deauville American Film Festival on September 6, 2022, where Jamie Sisley received the Deauville Grand Special Prize nominee.

== Reception ==
The review aggregator Rotten Tomatoes reported an approval rating of 91%, with an average rating of 6.8/10, based on 33 reviews. The website's consensus reads, "Empathetic and consistently believable, Stay Awake is an uncommonly nuanced depiction of addiction's impact on the addict's family." Metacritic gave the film a weighted average score of 62 out of 100, based on eight critics, indicating "generally favorable reviews".
