= Annie Atkins =

Welsh graphic designer

Annie Atkins is a Welsh/Irish graphic designer and prop maker for film and television. She is known for her graphic design work in The Grand Budapest Hotel (2014) and has gone on to work with director Wes Anderson on Isle of Dogs (2018) and The French Dispatch (2021).

== Early life ==
Atkins grew up in Dolwyddelan in Northern Wales. Her mother was an artist and her father a graphic designer. Atkins graduated with a degree in visual communications from Ravensbourne University London. After graduation, she worked as an art director in the advertising agency McCann-Erickson in Reykjavík, Iceland. In 2007, she enrolled in University College Dublin's master's in film production program after losing enthusiasm for her work at McCann-Erickson. Inteviewed in 2017, she said: "I thought I'd leave design completely, that I'd study film and be a camera operator or a technician, and then I found this whole other world of design."

== Career ==
After graduating from University College Dublin, she worked as a designer on the third season of the BBC costume drama The Tudors in 2008. As the role was broadly defined, she had varying responsibilities, such as working as a stonemason, signwriter and scribe, and prop maker. After The Tudors, Atkins remained in Dublin and bounced around film jobs.

Atkins was lead graphic designer on The Grand Budapest Hotel (2014). The film won the Academy Award for Best Production Design at the 87th Academy Awards.

Atkins worked on her first video game project, "That's You!", in 2018.

She teaches workshops at her studio in Dublin, Ireland.

Atkins has published four books, three of which have been translated (French, Spanish, Catalan, and Japanese.)

== Filmography ==
=== Television ===
Title	Notes
The Tudors	
Camelot	
Titanic: Blood and Steel	
Vikings	
Penny Dreadful	

=== Film ===
Year	Title	Notes
2014	The Boxtrolls	
2014	The Grand Budapest Hotel	
2015	Bridge of Spies	
2016	Billy Lynn's Long Halftime Walk	
2018	Isle of Dogs	
2021	The French Dispatch	
2021	West Side Story	

== Publications ==
- Atkins, Annie (2008). To the Left of the Midwest. Self-published.
- Atkins, Annie (2020). Fake Love Letters, Forged Telegrams, and Prison Escape Maps: Designing Graphic Props for Filmmaking. Phaidon Press. ISBN 978-0714879383.
- Atkins, Annie (2020). 映画プロップ・グラフィックス スクリーンの中の小道具たち (Japanese ed.). Phaidon Press. ISBN 978-4766133769.
- Atkins, Annie (2024). Letters from the North Pole: With Five Letters from Santa Claus to Pull Out and Read. Fia Tobig illustrator. Magic Cat Publishing. ISBN 978-1915569486.
- Atkins, Annie (2024). Lettres du Père Noël. Fia Tobig illustrator (French ed.). Glenat Jeunesse. ISBN 979-1026404767.
- Atkins, Annie (2025). Cartes des del Pol Nord. Fia Tobig illustrator (Catalan ed.). Baula. ISBN 978-8447953004.
- Atkins, Annie (2025). Cartas desde el Polo Norte: Con cinco cartas de Santa Claus. Fia Tobig illustrator (Spanish ed.). Editorial Luis Vives (Edelvives). ISBN 978-8414064924.
- Atkins, Annie (2026). Letters from the Witch: Cackle Crackle: With Five Spells to Pull Out and Keep. Taryn Knight illustrator. Magic Cat Publishing. ISBN 978-1917768139.
- Atkins, Annie (2026). Lettres des sorcières. Taryn Knight illustrator (French ed.). Glenat Jeunesse. ISBN 979-1026405573.
