= Non-Stop (film) =

2014 film by Jaume Collet-Serra

- Theatrical release poster
- Directed by: Jaume Collet-Serra
- Screenplay by: John W. Richardson; Chris Roach; Ryan Engle
- Story by: John W. Richardson; Chris Roach
- Produced by: Joel Silver; Alex Heineman; Andrew Rona
- Starring: Liam Neeson; Julianne Moore; Scoot McNairy; Michelle Dockery; Nate Parker; Jason Butler Harner; Anson Mount
- Cinematography: Flavio Labiano
- Edited by: Jim May
- Music by: John Ottman
- Production companies: TF1 Films Production; Silver Pictures; Anton Capital Entertainment SCA; Canal+; TF1; LoveFilm
- Distributed by: Universal Pictures (United States and Canada); StudioCanal (International)
- Release dates: January 27, 2014 (Paris); February 26, 2014 (France); February 28, 2014 (United States)
- Running time: 106 minutes
- Countries: France; United States; United Kingdom; Canada
- Language: English
- Budget: $28–50 million
- Box office: $223 million

Non-Stop is a 2014 action thriller film directed by Jaume Collet-Serra, co-produced by Joel Silver, and starring Liam Neeson and Julianne Moore. The film follows an alcoholic ex-NYPD officer turned Federal Air Marshal who must find the killer on an international flight from New York to London after receiving texts saying someone on board will die every 20 minutes until financial demands are met. The film marks the second collaboration between Collet-Serra and Neeson after Unknown (2011).

An international co-production among France, the United States, the United Kingdom and Canada, it was the first and only film from Silver Pictures to be distributed by Universal Pictures since the end of Silver's deal with Warner Bros. Released in the United States on February 28, 2014, the film received mixed reviews from critics and was a box office success, grossing $223 million worldwide.

== Plot ==
Bill Marks is a U.S. Air Marshal and ex-NYPD officer who boards a British non-stop transatlantic flight, British Aqualantic Airlines Flight 10, from New York City to London. Bill sits next to Jen Summers in business class, who has switched seats so that she can sit by the window. After takeoff, Bill receives a text message on his secure phone stating that someone will die every 20 minutes unless $150 million is transferred to a specified bank account. Bill breaks protocol and consults the flight's other air marshal Jack Hammond, who dismisses the threat. Bill instructs Jen and flight attendant Nancy to monitor the security cameras while texting the mysterious person in order to identify him.

When Bill catches Hammond on his phone nearing the 20-minute mark, he confronts him again. Hammond tries to bribe Bill which confirms his suspicions and attacks, forcing Bill to kill him exactly at the 20-minute mark. Bill finds cocaine in his briefcase and learns the perpetrator had blackmailed him and set him up for death. Bill alerts the TSA, but TSA Agent Marenick informs Bill that the bank account is registered in his name and accuses him of being the perpetrator. Captain David McMillan is apparently poisoned, but co-pilot First Officer Kyle Rice convinces Bill that he is innocent. Bill searches the resentful passengers, where one of them uploads a video in which Marks accuses and manhandles schoolteacher Tom Bowen, convincing the rest of the world that Bill is the perpetrator.

Rice is instructed by the TSA to divert to Iceland. Bill persuades programmer Zack White to write a computer virus to make the hijacker's phone ring. The phone rings in passenger Charles Wheeler's suit pocket, but he denies it is his. As Bill roughly questions him, Wheeler suddenly dies, foaming at the mouth. In the first-class lavatory, Bill discovers a hole drilled into the wall that offers a clear shot to the pilot's seat and discovers a dart in Wheeler's body. A passenger tells him that Jen entered the lavatory recently. Bill accuses Jen of being the hijacker. Jen becomes upset as she had stood by him and convinces him of her innocence. Two RAF Typhoon fighter jets meet Flight 10 to escort it to a military base in Iceland.

Jen and Bill unlock the hijacker's phone, which unintentionally starts a 30-minute timer for a bomb. Through words in a television news report claiming that Marks is hijacking their flight, Bill realizes that the bomb bypassed the security checks, and finds it in Hammond's cocaine briefcase. When some passengers attack Bill, Bowen stops them, believing that the bomb is the priority. Bill convinces the others of his innocence and has them move the bomb to the rear and surround it with luggage to direct the blast outward, while everybody moves upfront. Bill urges Rice to follow explosive protocol and descend from 30,000 to 8,000 feet as the current pressure differential will destroy the airplane if the bomb explodes, although the escorting jets refuse to let Rice deviate from his course.

Watching the earlier video, Bill notices Bowen planting the phone on Wheeler, implicating Bowen as the mastermind of the murders. Zack reveals himself as Bowen's accomplice. Bowen reveals that his father was killed in the September 11 attacks and blames the U.S. for not improving their security enough to prevent future similar attacks. Their goal was to frame Bill as a terrorist, thus ruining the reputation of the Air Marshals Service to force the U.S. to create stronger security laws. Bill persuades Zack (who was in it for the money) to try to disarm the bomb. Bowen, who wishes to die on the plane in a suicide mission, double-crosses Zack and shoots him. Rice rapidly descends the aircraft to 8,000 feet, giving Bill the opportunity to kill Bowen. Zack regains consciousness and attacks Bill, but the bomb detonates, killing him and blowing open the back of the plane. Despite the damage, Rice barely lands the plane in Iceland with no additional loss of life. Bill is praised as a hero and exonerated, where it is also implied that he and Jen might begin a relationship.

== Cast ==
- Liam Neeson as Bill Marks, a Federal Air Marshal and former NYPD officer
- Julianne Moore as Jen Summers
- Scoot McNairy as Tom Bowen
- Michelle Dockery as Nancy Hoffman, a flight attendant
- Nate Parker as Zack White
- Corey Stoll as Austin Reilly, a passenger and NYPD officer
- Lupita Nyong'o as Gwen Lloyd, a flight attendant
- Omar Metwally as Dr. Fahim Nasir, a surgeon aboard the flight
- Jason Butler Harner as Kyle Rice, the co-pilot
- Linus Roache as David McMillan, the captain of the flight
- Shea Whigham as Agent Marenick, a TSA agent
- Anson Mount as Jack Hammond, the other Federal Air Marshal working on the flight
- Quinn McColgan as Becca, a little girl whom Bill befriends
- Corey Hawkins as Travis Mitchell, a smart-mouthed passenger
- Frank Deal as Charles Wheeler, a bankruptcy attorney
- Bar Paly as Iris Marianne, a lascivious passenger

== Production ==
Filming began on November 1, 2012, at York Studios in Maspeth, Queens, New York City, then continued at JFK Airport on December 7, 2012, and at Long Island MacArthur Airport. This was the inaugural movie filmed at York Studios.

== Music ==
Non-Stop

Soundtrack album by John Ottman
- Released: April 3, 2014
- Length: 53:10
- Label: Varèse Sarabande 302 067 251 8

The original motion picture soundtrack was composed by John Ottman. The record was released on April 3, 2014, via Varèse Sarabande label.

No.	Title	Length
1.	"Non-Stop"	3:13
2.	"Damaged Goods"	3:43
3.	"Usual Suspects"	1:20
4.	"Welcome to Aqualantic"	1:04
5.	"First Text"	3:16
6.	"Random Search"	1:41
7.	"Do Something for Me"	2:43
8.	"Circling Passengers"	3:12
9.	"Interrogations"	3:24
10.	"What Happened to Amsterdam?"	3:46
11.	"Death Number One"	2:08
12.	"Reluctant Passenger/Blue Ribbon"	2:09
13.	"Fuck It"	3:43
14.	"Explosions Protocol"	1:56
15.	"Ambush"	1:40
16.	"Message Received"	3:21
17.	"Bathroom Discovery"	1:49
18.	"8000 Feet"	2:11
19.	"Unloaded Weapon"	1:31
20.	"Crash Landing"	1:27
21.	"Epilogue"	3:53
Total length:		53:10

== Home media ==
Non-Stop was released on Blu-ray Disc and DVD on June 10, 2014.

== Reception ==
=== Box office ===
The film opened in 3,090 theaters in the United States and Canada, making $10 million on opening day. It went on to debut to $28.8 million, finishing first ahead of former box-office leader The Lego Movie, which also starred Neeson, and fellow new release Son of God. In its second weekend the film dropped 45%, grossing $15.8 million and finishing third.

The film earned $92.1 million in North America and $130.6 million in other territories for a total worldwide gross of $223 million, against a budget of $50 million.

=== Critical response ===
On Rotten Tomatoes the film holds an approval rating of 62% based on 228 reviews, with an average rating of 5.80/10. The website's critical consensus reads: "While Liam Neeson is undoubtedly an asset, Non-Stop wastes its cast — not to mention its solid premise and tense setup—on a poorly conceived story that hinges on a thoroughly unbelievable final act." Metacritic assigned the film a weighted average score of 56 out of 100, based on 41 critics, indicating "mixed or average reviews". Audiences polled by CinemaScore gave the film an average grade of "A−" on an A+ to F scale.

Chris Nashawaty gave a positive review in Entertainment Weekly. "At a certain point either you'll fasten your seat belt and go with Non-Stop's absurd, Looney Tunes logic or you won't. Against my better judgment, I went with it. After all, Neeson has shown time and again that he's the closest thing Hollywood has these days to a box office Rumpelstiltskin. He can spin cheese into gold." David Denby was ambivalent on the film's overall scope in New Yorker, but he praised Neeson who "moves his big body through confined spaces (virtually the entire movie takes place in the airplane) with so much power that you expect him to rip out the seats."

Richard Corliss inTime wrote that the film "is no more or less than what it intends to be.... Why demand logic of an action movie released in February, when audiences just want a nice, bumpy ride?" Susan Wloszczyna of RogerEbert.com wrote that the movie "is so ridiculously entertaining in spite of its occasional lapses in real-world logic." Tom Shone of The Guardian maintained a similar tone in his review, saying of Neeson: "He's at his best striding up and down the aisles of the aircraft with that big, rolling gait of his, carving out great wads of air with his hands, barking orders, his face in Rodin-ish profile, his destiny, like Mitchum's, enlivened by a nobility far greater than the film he finds himself in – the true sign of a B-movie king".

== Possible sequel ==
On June 11, 2014, Entertainment Weekly reported that in an interview with producer Joel Silver, he talked about the possibility of a sequel and stated that it will not be happening on a plane again. "I need to think of a way to put them in an equal situation. But when I make a sequel I like to replicate the experience not replicate the movie. I'm not going to put them on a plane again, of course. He has a touch of Sherlock Holmes in that he has to figure out what's going on and then he has to figure out how to solve it. I think that character's a great character and we'll try to figure something else to do. I haven't thought about it yet but I have to, sooner or later."
