= Wes Anderson filmography =

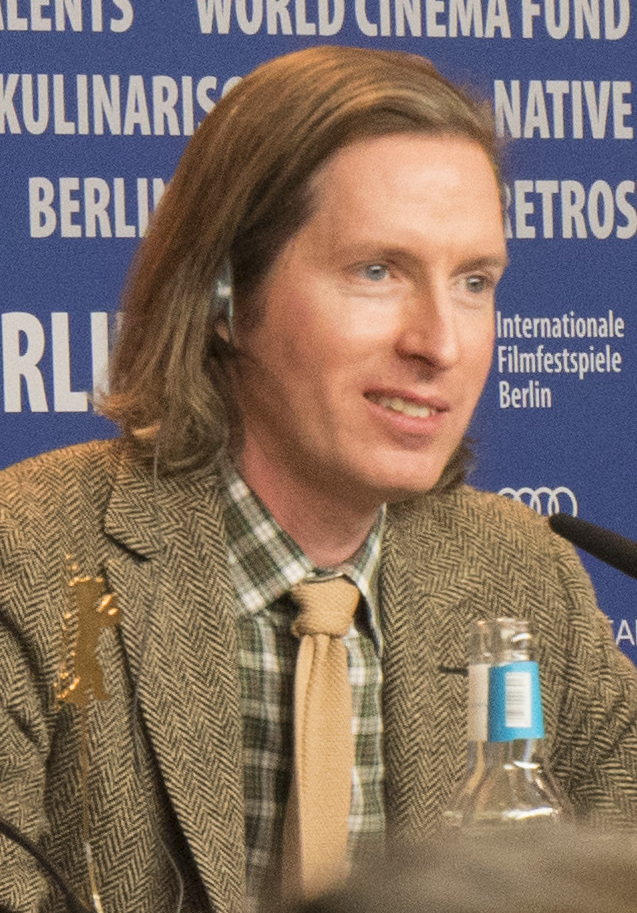
Anderson at the 2018 Berlin Film Festival

Wes Anderson is an American filmmaker known for feature films, commercials, and short films.

Anderson directed the short film Bottle Rocket which was later adapted into his feature length directorial debut film Bottle Rocket (1996). He later directed his sophomore film Rushmore (1998), which established himself as an independent film auteur. He often collaborated with the brothers Luke Wilson and Owen Wilson during that time and founded his production company American Empirical Pictures. He further established his unique style with The Royal Tenenbaums (2001), The Life Aquatic with Steve Zissou (2004), The Darjeeling Limited (2007), and his first stop-motion film, Fantastic Mr. Fox (2009), Moonrise Kingdom (2012), and The Grand Budapest Hotel (2014).

His later works include his second stop-motion film, Isle of Dogs (2018), the anthology comedy The French Dispatch (2021), the science fiction dramedy Asteroid City (2023) and the espionage caper comedy The Phoenician Scheme (2025). Anderson won the Academy Award for Best Live Action Short Film for The Wonderful Story of Henry Sugar (2023).

== As a director ==
=== Feature films ===
Year	Title	Director	Writer	Producer
1996	Bottle Rocket	Yes	Yes	No
1998	Rushmore	Yes	Yes	Executive
2001	The Royal Tenenbaums	Yes	Yes	Yes
2004	The Life Aquatic with Steve Zissou	Yes	Yes	Yes
2007	The Darjeeling Limited	Yes	Yes	Yes
2009	Fantastic Mr. Fox	Yes	Yes	Yes
2012	Moonrise Kingdom	Yes	Yes	Yes
2014	The Grand Budapest Hotel	Yes	Yes	Yes
2018	Isle of Dogs	Yes	Yes	Yes
2021	The French Dispatch	Yes	Yes	Yes
2023	Asteroid City	Yes	Yes	Yes
2024	The Wonderful Story of Henry Sugar and Three More (Note: Compilation film of all four short film adaptations of Roald Dahl's stories that Anderson directed in 2023.)	Yes	Yes	Yes
2025	The Phoenician Scheme	Yes	Yes	Yes

Producer only

- The Squid and the Whale (2005)

Executive producer only

- She's Funny That Way (2014)
- Escapes (2017)
- Uncropped (2023)

=== Short films ===
Year	Title	Director	Writer	Producer	Notes
1993	Bottle Rocket	Yes	Yes	No	Shot in 1992, released in 1993
2007	Hotel Chevalier	Yes	Yes	Yes	Prequel to The Darjeeling Limited
2012	Do You Like to Read?	Yes	Yes	Yes	Promotional shorts for Moonrise Kingdom
2012	Cousin Ben Troop Screening	Yes	Yes	No	Promotional shorts for Moonrise Kingdom
2013	Castello Cavalcanti	Yes	Yes	No	Commissioned by Prada
2023	Asteroid City: Location Featurette	Yes	Yes	Yes	Promotional short for Asteroid City
2023	The Wonderful Story of Henry Sugar	Yes	Yes	Yes	Netflix shorts based on stories by Roald Dahl
2023	The Swan	Yes	Yes	Yes	Netflix shorts based on stories by Roald Dahl
2023	The Rat Catcher	Yes	Yes	Yes	Netflix shorts based on stories by Roald Dahl
2023	Poison	Yes	Yes	Yes	Netflix shorts based on stories by Roald Dahl

=== Commercials ===
Year	Title	Director	Writer	Company	Notes
2004	"My Life, My Card"	Yes	Yes	American Express	Starring Wes Anderson as himself
2008	"Softbank"	Yes	No	Softbank	Japanese commercial filmed in France
2010	"Apartomatic"	Yes	No	Stella Artois	Co-directed with Roman Coppola
2012	"Made of Imagination"	Yes	No	Sony Xperia	Stop-motion animation
2013	"Candy"	Yes	No	Prada	Co-directed with Roman Coppola
2016	"Come Together: A Fashion Picture in Motion"	Yes	Yes	H&M	Starring Adrien Brody and Garth Jennings.
2024	"100 Years of Meisterstück"	Yes	Yes	Montblanc	Starring Wes Anderson, Jason Schwartzman and Rupert Friend. (Note: Wes Anderson also announced that he designed his own pen for the company named the Schreiberling.)
2025	"Let's Write"	Yes	Yes	Montblanc	Starring Wes Anderson, Rupert Friend, Michael Cera, Waris Ahluwalia & Esther McGregor

=== Music Videos ===
Year	Title	Director	Artist	Notes
2021	"Aline"	Yes	Written by Christophe, performed by Jarvis Cocker	Promotional music video for The French Dispatch

== As an actor ==
=== Film ===
Year	Title	Role	Notes
1996	Bottle Rocket	Passenger on bus	Uncredited cameo
1998	Rushmore	Student	Uncredited cameo
2001	The Royal Tenenbaums	Tennis match commentator	Uncredited cameo
2009	Fantastic Mr. Fox	Stan Weasel	Voice role
2016	Sing	Additional Voices	Voice role
2021	Sing 2	Additional Voices	Voice role
2024	100 Years of Meisterstück	Himself	
2025	Let's Write	Himself	

=== Documentary ===
Year	Title	Notes
2014	One Day Since Yesterday: Peter Bogdanovich & the Lost American Film	
2015	Hitchcock/Truffaut	
2018	Always at the Carlyle	
2018	Friedkin Uncut	
2023	Uncropped	Also executive producer

== Reception ==
Year	Film	Rotten Tomatoes	Metacritic	Budget	Box office
1996	Bottle Rocket	86% (6.8/10 average rating) (68 reviews)	67 (24 reviews)	$7 million	$560,000
1998	Rushmore	90% (8.2/10 average rating) (105 reviews)	86 (32 reviews)	$9 million	$17.1 million
2001	The Royal Tenenbaums	81% (7.5/10 average rating) (215 reviews)	76 (34 reviews)	$21 million	$71.4 million
2004	The Life Aquatic with Steve Zissou	57% (6.1/10 average rating) (226 reviews)	62 (38 reviews)	$50 million	$34.8 million
2007	The Darjeeling Limited	69% (6.6/10 average rating) (189 reviews)	67 (35 reviews)	$16 million	$35.1 million
2009	Fantastic Mr. Fox	93% (7.9/10 average rating) (246 reviews)	83 (34 reviews)	$40 million	$46.5 million
2012	Moonrise Kingdom	93% (8.3/10 average rating) (269 reviews)	84 (43 reviews)	$16 million	$68.3 million
2014	The Grand Budapest Hotel	92% (8.5/10 average rating) (318 reviews)	88 (48 reviews)	$25 million	$174.8 million
2018	Isle of Dogs	90% (8.0/10 average rating) (370 reviews)	82 (55 reviews)	$35 million	$64.2 million
2021	The French Dispatch	75% (7.1/10 average rating) (312 reviews)	74 (57 reviews)	$25 million	$46.3 million
2023	Asteroid City	75% (7/10 average rating) (338 reviews)	74 (60 reviews)	$25 million	$54 million
2025	The Phoenician Scheme	78% (279 reviews)	70 (53 reviews)	$30 million	$38 million

== Frequent collaborators ==
Anderson's films feature many recurring actors, including the Wilson brothers (Owen, Luke, and Andrew), Bill Murray, Jason Schwartzman, Anjelica Huston, Willem Dafoe, Jeff Goldblum, Edward Norton, Adrien Brody, Bob Balaban, and Tilda Swinton. Robert Yeoman has served as director of photography for all of Anderson's live-action films, while Mark Mothersbaugh composed Anderson's first four films, with Alexandre Desplat composing all since Fantastic Mr. Fox. Randall Poster has served as music supervisor for all of Anderson's films since Rushmore. His films have often been financed by Steven Rales through his production company Indian Paintbrush.

Work Actor	1996	1998	2001	2004	2007	2009	2012	2014	2018	2021	2023	2024	2025	—N/a
Work Actor	Bottle Rocket	Rushmore	Royal Tenenbaums	Life Aquatic	Darjeeling Limited	Fantastic Mr. Fox	Moonrise Kingdom	Grand Budapest Hotel	Isle of Dogs	French Dispatch	Asteroid City	Henry Sugar	Phoenician Scheme	Total
F. Murray Abraham								Yes	Yes				Yes	3
Waris Ahluwalia				Yes	Yes			Yes						3
Mathieu Amalric								Yes		Yes			Yes	3
Bob Balaban							Yes	Yes	Yes	Yes	Yes			5
Adrien Brody					Yes	Yes		Yes		Yes	Yes			5
Seymour Cassel		Yes	Yes	Yes										3
Jarvis Cocker						Yes				Yes	Yes	Yes		4
Bryan Cranston									Yes		Yes		Yes	3
Willem Dafoe				Yes		Yes		Yes		Yes	Yes		Yes	6
Rupert Friend										Yes	Yes	Yes	Yes	4
Jeff Goldblum				Yes				Yes	Yes		Yes			4
Anjelica Huston			Yes	Yes	Yes				Yes	Yes				5
Scarlett Johansson									Yes		Yes		Yes	3
Harvey Keitel							Yes	Yes	Yes					3
Frances McDormand							Yes		Yes	Yes				3
Bill Murray		Yes	Yes	Yes	Yes	Yes	Yes	Yes	Yes	Yes			Yes	10
Edward Norton							Yes	Yes	Yes	Yes	Yes			5
Larry Pine		Yes			Yes	Yes		Yes		Yes				5
Tony Revolori								Yes		Yes	Yes			3
Liev Schreiber									Yes	Yes	Yes			3
Jason Schwartzman		Yes			Yes	Yes	Yes	Yes		Yes	Yes			7
Fisher Stevens							Yes	Yes	Yes	Yes	Yes			5
Tilda Swinton							Yes	Yes	Yes	Yes	Yes			5
Andrew Wilson	Yes	Yes	Yes											3
Luke Wilson	Yes	Yes	Yes											3
Owen Wilson	Yes		Yes	Yes	Yes	Yes		Yes		Yes				7
Wallace Wolodarsky		Yes			Yes	Yes		Yes		Yes				5
Jeffrey Wright										Yes	Yes		Yes	3
