= The Wonderful Story of Henry Sugar and Three More =

- Promotional release poster
- Directed by: Wes Anderson
- Screenplay by: Wes Anderson
- Based on: "The Wonderful Story of Henry Sugar" "The Swan" "The Ratcatcher" "Poison" "Lucky Break" by Roald Dahl
- Produced by: Wes Anderson; Steven Rales; Jeremy Dawson
- Starring: Ralph Fiennes; Benedict Cumberbatch; Dev Patel; Ben Kingsley; Richard Ayoade; Rupert Friend
- Cinematography: Robert Yeoman; Roman Coppola (The Swan)
- Edited by: Barney Pilling; Andrew Weisblum
- Production companies: Indian Paintbrush; American Empirical Pictures; The Roald Dahl Story Company
- Distributed by: Netflix
- Release date: March 15, 2024 (worldwide)
- Running time: 88 minutes
- Countries: United States; United Kingdom
- Language: English

The Wonderful Story of Henry Sugar and Three More is a 2024 fantasy anthology film written, directed and co-produced by Wes Anderson, based on four short stories by Roald Dahl. This is the second film adaptation of a Dahl work directed by Anderson, following Fantastic Mr. Fox (2009). It stars Benedict Cumberbatch, Ralph Fiennes, Dev Patel, Ben Kingsley, Richard Ayoade, and Rupert Friend, all playing different roles throughout.

The film was released on March 15, 2024, as an anthology compilation of Anderson's short films released in 2023, The Wonderful Story of Henry Sugar, The Swan, The Rat Catcher and Poison. The anthology’s title references the short story collection from which the titular story derives, The Wonderful Story of Henry Sugar & Six More.

== Plot ==
The film is presented as a series of telefilms that aired in the United Kingdom on the fictitious Channel 7, from 1978 to 1981.

The film begins with Roald Dahl describing his writing process before beginning a new story. The anthology consists of four short film vignettes, each one based on the corresponding short story by Dahl, preserving the majority of the text and narration of the original text. Throughout each of the films, scene and costume changes are performed in front of the camera by visible stage hands and the same actors play multiple characters throughout each story.

=== The Wonderful Story of Henry Sugar ===
Henry Sugar is the pseudonym of a bachelor who uses his inherited fortune to fund his gambling habits. One day, he comes across a book containing a medical report on the case of Imdad Khan, a man who claimed he could see and interact without using his eyes. The author, Doctor Z.Z. Chatterjee, met Imdad when he visited his hospital and requested that Chatterjee and his associate Dr. Marshall professionally bandage his eyes so he cannot see as part of a publicity stunt for his act in a travelling circus. After having his eyes securely wrapped in gauze, Imdad proceeded to walk out of the hospital and perfectly ride a bicycle through traffic while blind. Chatterjee attended Imdad's performance, in which even more miraculous stunts were performed, after which he interviewed Imdad, and he tells him his life history. As a young runaway in a traveling circus, he sought out a guru known as The Great Yogi, who could meditate while levitating his own body. Reluctantly, the Great Yogi taught Imdad his meditation method, which granted Imdad his abilities over the course of 20 years of daily practice. Chatterjee returned to the circus the following day only to discover that Imdad died in his sleep the previous night, and the secret was lost before the doctors could further study it.

By practising Imdad's meditations of staring into a candle flame at eye level while picturing the face of the person he loves most in the world (himself), Henry manages to see through the backs of playing cards to read the face value after three years of practice, something that Imdad had been told that only one in a billion would be able to do in a short amount of time. Henry uses his ability at a casino and makes £30,000 at blackjack. Unsatisfied with his ease in earning money, he throws the money off his balcony into the streets of London. After he nearly causes a riot, a police officer gives him an enraged dressing down for throwing money away frivolously instead of donating to a structured charity where it could benefit those most in need. Henry decides to travel worldwide, winning money from casinos with his ability under varying disguises and establishing a network of successful hospitals and orphanages. Two decades later, Henry dies from a pulmonary embolism which he knew would cause his death, being able to see the clot through his skin. His accountant commissioned Dahl to write his story under the condition his identity remains confidential.

=== The Swan ===
Adapted from the 1977 short story with the same title.

In a monologue aided by stagehands, Peter Watson recounts an incident that happened to him as a 13-year-old boy. Ernie, his school bully, receives a rifle for his 15th birthday. Ernie and his friend Raymond use it to shoot small birds before training it on Peter. At gunpoint, Peter is made to lie in the path of an oncoming train; he survives by sinking into the trackbed as the train passes. Next, the bullies take him to a duck pond and force him to act as their "gun-dog". The bird-loving Peter becomes incensed when Ernie kills a swan, and Ernie responds by cutting the bird's wings off and tying them to Peter's arms, before forcing him to climb to the top of a weeping willow and asking him to jump into the lake below. Peter refuses, but a shot from Ernie's rifle hits him in the leg and knocks him off balance. As Peter struggles to keep himself aloft, he sees a bright light in the lake which seems to beckon him on. Letting go of the tree, he dives towards it, creating the image of an enormous swan flying over the village. He lands in the garden of his home, where he is found by his mother.

=== The Rat Catcher ===
The penultimate short film is based on the story The Ratcatcher from the 1953 collection.

A rat-catcher comes to a petrol station to combat a rat infestation there. Station attendant Claud and a reporter take him to a hayrick across the road and the ratter scatters some oats around the hayrick. He repeats that for two more days and on the fourth day he places poisoned oats in little piles at every corner of the hayrick.

Arriving the next day and demanding a sack to collect the expected large number of dead rats, he is peeved to find not a single one. To regain the waning respect of Claud and the reporter, the rat-catcher performs a demonstration: he takes a live rat out of one of his pockets and a ferret out of another pocket, puts both animals down his shirt and then has the ferret kill the rat on his body. The catcher then performs the second demonstration as a bet how he can kill a rat without using his hands: he takes another live rat out of his knapsack, ties it to a petrol pump and kills it with his teeth. Having spat the dead animal's blood out and retrieved the won money, he states that confectionery factories and chocolate-makers use rat blood to make liquorice and then leaves. Thoroughly disgusted, Claud and the reporter are relieved to see him go. Once gone, the reporter remarks that the rats must have found something "nutritious" in the hayrick. He and Claud then glance at a flyer for a local man who has been missing for some time, before turning their attention to the hayrick.

=== Poison ===
A short film adaptation of the story published in 1950.

Timber Woods finds his friend Harry Pope in bed motionless, sweating and in a state of panic. Harry explains that a krait (a venomous snake) has crawled onto his stomach underneath the covers, and asks Timber to fetch a doctor before the snake can bite him. Timber calls Dr. Ganderbai, a local Indian doctor who rushes to help. The two frantically attempt to get the snake off Harry through various methods, including injecting him with an antivenom and sedating the snake using chloroform. It is eventually revealed that there is no snake on Harry.

After the initial panic, Ganderbai inquires whether Harry is certain that there actually was a snake. Believing that Ganderbai is calling him a liar, Harry angrily hurls racial slurs at him, leading Ganderbai to storm out of the room. Timber thanks him and apologizes for Harry's behavior, telling him not to listen to Harry because of the state he has been in. A proud Ganderbai refuses the apology and drives home.

=== Credits: Rules for Being a Fictional Writer ===
Over the closing titles, Jarvis Cocker played the spoken-word song "Rules for Being a Fictional Writer", based on the seven tips Dahl listed out for writing fiction in the chapter "Lucky Break".

== Cast ==
- Benedict Cumberbatch as
  - Henry Sugar
  - Max Engelman
  - Harry Pope
- Ralph Fiennes as
  - Roald Dahl
  - the Policeman
  - the Rat Man
- Dev Patel as
  - Dr. Chatterjee
  - John Winston
  - Timber Woods
- Ben Kingsley as
  - Imdad Khan
  - the Dealer
  - Dr. Ganderbai
- Richard Ayoade as
  - Dr. Marshall
  - the Great Yogi
  - the Editor/Reporter
- Rupert Friend as
  - Peter Watson/Narrator
  - Claud
- David Gant as Casino Croupier
- Asa Jennings as young Peter Watson
- Jarvis Cocker cameos as
  - a casino receptionist
  - several friends of Henry Sugar

== Production ==
In September 2021, Netflix acquired the Roald Dahl Story Company for $686 million. The Wonderful Story of Henry Sugar project was confirmed on January 7, 2022, the day after it was reported that Wes Anderson was set to write and direct the film adaptation, with Netflix distributing. It was announced that Benedict Cumberbatch would star as Sugar, with Ralph Fiennes, Dev Patel and Ben Kingsley in supporting roles. Rupert Friend and Richard Ayoade later joined the cast.

Principal photography began at The Maidstone Studios in Kent, England in January 2022.

== Reception ==
Roger Moore in his Movie Nation blog gave the film a rating of 3.5/4, concluding with:

The way Anderson uses the actors, deadpan performances (mostly), narrating in a stacatto style, parked in front of clever settings in varying degrees of surreal “realism,” is almost animation... His style can be grating, especially that self-aware mugging-to-the-camera that he insists on. But here we see its greatest application, deadpan turns played underneath screwball-comedy-speed dialogue...
The real Dahl was a real piece of work. But the work is timeless, and Anderson has rendered it in its most entertaining cinematic form with this short story collection feature film.
