= The Wonderful Story of Henry Sugar (film) =

2023 American short film

Roald Dahl's The Wonderful Story of Henry Sugar
- Promotional release poster
- Directed by: Wes Anderson
- Screenplay by: Wes Anderson
- Based on: "The Wonderful Story of Henry Sugar" by Roald Dahl
- Produced by: Wes Anderson; Steven Rales; Jeremy Dawson
- Starring: Ralph Fiennes; Benedict Cumberbatch; Dev Patel; Ben Kingsley; Richard Ayoade
- Cinematography: Robert Yeoman
- Edited by: Barney Pilling; Andrew Weisblum
- Production companies: Indian Paintbrush; American Empirical Pictures
- Distributed by: Netflix
- Release dates: September 1, 2023 (Venice); September 20, 2023 (United States); September 27, 2023 (Netflix)
- Running time: 39 minutes
- Country: United States
- Language: English

Roald Dahl's The Wonderful Story of Henry Sugar, or simply The Wonderful Story of Henry Sugar, is a 2023 American fantasy short film written, co-produced, and directed by Wes Anderson, based on the 1977 short story "The Wonderful Story of Henry Sugar" by Roald Dahl. It is the second film adaptation of a Dahl work directed by Anderson, following Fantastic Mr. Fox (2009). It stars Benedict Cumberbatch as the titular character alongside Ralph Fiennes, Dev Patel, Ben Kingsley, and Richard Ayoade. The story sees a rich man learning about a clairvoyant guru who could see without using his eyes through the power of a particular form of Yoga, then setting out to master the skill in order to cheat at gambling.

The film is the first of a four-part series of shorts adapted from Dahl's short stories, including "The Swan", "The Rat Catcher", and "Poison". Development on the project began in January 2022, with most of the cast signed on. Principal photography took place in London that month. The Wonderful Story of Henry Sugar was originally reported to be a feature film until Anderson clarified in June 2023 that it would be one of a collection of short films.

The Wonderful Story of Henry Sugar premiered at the 80th Venice International Film Festival on September 1, 2023, and received a limited theatrical release on September 20, 2023, followed by being released on Netflix on September 27, 2023. The other three Anderson shorts based on Dahl stories premiered on Netflix on succeeding days: The Swan on September 28, The Rat Catcher on September 29, and Poison on September 30. On March 15, 2024, the film was released in a feature length film anthology along with the other three shorts titled The Wonderful Story of Henry Sugar and Three More.

It received positive reviews critics and won the Academy Award for Best Live Action Short Film at the 96th Academy Awards.

== Plot ==
The story is presented as a telefilm that aired in the United Kingdom on the fictitious Channel 7 in 1978.

Henry Sugar is the pseudonym of a bachelor who uses his inherited fortune to fund his gambling habits. One day, he comes across a book of a doctor's report of Imdad Khan, a man who claimed he could see and interact without using his eyes. After watching Imdad perform even greater feats in his own circus act, the doctor interviewed Imdad, and he tells him his life history. As a young runaway in a traveling circus, he sought out a guru known as The Great Yogi, who could meditate while levitating his own body. Reluctantly, the Great Yogi taught Imdad his meditation method, which granted Imdad his abilities, though he died overnight before the doctors could further study him.

By practising Imdad's meditations of staring into a candle flame at eye level while picturing the face of the person he loves most in the world, Henry manages to see through the backs of playing cards to read the face value after three years of practice, something that Imdad had been told that only one in a billion would be able to do in a short amount of time. Henry uses his ability at a casino and makes £30,000 at blackjack. Unsatisfied with his ease in earning money, he throws the money off his balcony into the streets of London. After he nearly causes a riot, a police officer suggests that he find a more effective form of charity. Henry decides to travel worldwide, winning money from casinos with his ability under varying disguises and establishing a network of successful hospitals and orphanages. Two decades later, Henry dies from a pulmonary embolism which he knew would cause his death, being able to see the clot through his skin. His accountant commissions Roald Dahl to write his story under the condition his identity remain confidential.

== Cast ==
- Benedict Cumberbatch as
  - Henry Sugar
  - Max Engelman
- Ralph Fiennes as
  - Roald Dahl
  - The Policeman
- Dev Patel as
  - Dr. Chatterjee
  - John Winston
- Ben Kingsley as
  - Imdad Khan
  - The Dealer
- Richard Ayoade as
  - Dr. Marshall
  - The Great Yogi
- David Gant as Casino Croupier
- Jarvis Cocker cameos as
  - a casino receptionist
  - several friends of Henry Sugar

== Production ==
In September 2021, Netflix acquired the Roald Dahl Story Company for $686 million. The Wonderful Story of Henry Sugar project was confirmed on January 7, 2022, the day after it was reported that Wes Anderson was set to write and direct the film adaptation, with Netflix distributing. It was announced that Benedict Cumberbatch would star as Sugar, with Ralph Fiennes, Dev Patel and Ben Kingsley in supporting roles. Rupert Friend and Richard Ayoade later joined the cast.

Principal photography began at The Maidstone Studios in Kent, England, in January 2022.

The Wonderful Story of Henry Sugar was originally reported to be a feature film, but Anderson clarified in June 2023 that it would be one of a collection of short films.

== Release ==
The Wonderful Story of Henry Sugar premiered out-of-competition at the 80th Venice International Film Festival on September 1, 2023. It had a limited theatrical release on September 20, only in New York and California. It was initially set for a streaming release on October 13, 2023, but was released on Netflix on September 27. The short was repackaged as an anthology movie with the three other shorts and released on Netflix on March 15, 2024.

== Reception ==
On the review aggregator website Rotten Tomatoes, the film holds an approval rating of 95% based on 98 reviews with an average rating of 8.4/10. The website's critics consensus reads, "With The Wonderful Story of Henry Sugar, Wes Anderson returns to the world of Roald Dahl—and proves his distinctive style is a comfortable fit for one of the author's sweetest stories." On Metacritic, the film holds a weighted average score of 85 out of 100 based on 31 critics, indicating "universal acclaim".

In Variety, Peter Debruge called the film "delightfully tight" and added that Dahl's short story "proves a good match for Anderson's intricate approach". Similarly, Leslie Felperin of The Hollywood Reporter wrote: "The Wonderful Story of Henry Sugar is a perfectly well-balanced reduction. It’s got most of Anderson's signature flavor notes but in healthy, clarified stock". David Ehrlich of IndieWire called it "the most visually inventive film that Anderson has made thus far" and added: "Its presentation is something we’ve never really seen before, either from Anderson or anyone else, but its ethos couldn’t be more familiar to anyone who’s followed his work". Glenn Kenny from RogerEbert.com gave the film a 4 out of 4 stars and wrote that, "It’s disarming and lovely to see a spiritual growth parable rendered in Anderson’s jewel-box style. His delivery here is not willfully eccentric but gorgeously centered. Form underscores content in Henry Sugar in a most delightful way."

=== Accolades ===
Award	Date of ceremony	Category	Recipient(s)	Result	Ref(s)
Astra Film and Creative Awards	January 6, 2024	Best Short Film	The Wonderful Story of Henry Sugar	Nominated	
Academy Awards	March 10, 2024	Best Live Action Short Film	Wes Anderson and Steven Rales	Won	
