= The Wonderful Story of Henry Sugar and Six More =

Collection of short stories by Roald Dahl

- First edition cover
- Author: Roald Dahl
- Cover artist: Quentin Blake
- Language: English
- Genre: Adventure
- Publisher: Jonathan Cape
- Publication date: 1977
- Publication place: United Kingdom
- Media type: Print
- Pages: 225
- ISBN: 0-14-130470-7
- Preceded by: Danny, the Champion of the World
- Followed by: The Enormous Crocodile

The Wonderful Story of Henry Sugar and Six More is a 1977 short story collection by British author Roald Dahl. The seven stories are generally regarded as being aimed at a slightly older audience than many of Dahl's other children's novels.

The stories were written at various times throughout his life. Two of the stories are autobiographical in nature; one describes how he first became a writer while the other describes some of Dahl's experiences as a fighter pilot in the Second World War. Another piece in the collection is a non-fiction account of a British farmer finding a legendary haul of ancient Roman treasure.

In 2023, the title story of the collection, "The Wonderful Story of Henry Sugar", was adapted into a short film directed by Wes Anderson with Benedict Cumberbatch as the titular character, alongside Ralph Fiennes, Dev Patel, Ben Kingsley, and Richard Ayoade. Another short story from the collection, "The Swan", was also adapted into a short film directed by Anderson in 2023 and subsequently included into his 2024 anthology film.

== Chapters ==
=== The Boy Who Talked with Animals ===
This is a first-person fiction piece of medium-length writing. The narrator, on advice from friends, decides to vacation in Jamaica. One night, a sea turtle, ancient and huge, is caught by a group of fishermen. Rich people want to buy it, while the manager of a nearby hotel wants to make turtle soup out of it, but both plans are foiled when a little boy appears and shames the crowd for their cruelty. His parents explain that he has a deep affinity for animals, and even talks to them. The boy's father pays off the fisherfolk and hotel manager, and the turtle is set free. The next day, the boy is missing, and the fisherfolk reveal that they have seen the child riding on the back of the sea turtle into the distance.

=== The Hitch-Hiker ===
This is another fictional first-person narrative. The narrator in this case has a brand new BMW 3.3 Li, and is enjoying a trip down the highway when he spots a hitchhiker. He lets the man into his car; the passenger is described as being curiously rat-like, with long, slim fingers. They engage in conversation, revealing the man's Cockney accent and attitudes.

As they talk, the narrator is urged by the hitchhiker to test the car's engine power by going ever faster. This results in a police motorbike pulling them over for speeding. The police officer who writes the ticket acts particularly harshly, threatening the narrator with a long prison sentence and a huge fine.

The narrator is despondent until his new friend challenges the narrator to guess his true profession. As he does, the hitchhiker suddenly reveals various items from the narrator's person, from a wallet to a watch to the narrator's shoelace. The narrator accuses the hitchhiker of being a pickpocket. The hitchhiker disagrees, claiming that he is a "fingersmith"—just as a goldsmith has mastered gold, he has mastered the use of his fingers. He claims that he is never caught due to his "fantastic fingers". He then reveals that he has stolen both of the police officer's notebooks, which contain the tickets and the details of the offence. Relieved, the narrator and the hitchhiker then stop on the highway to light a bonfire of the notebooks.

=== The Mildenhall Treasure ===
This is a non-fiction account of the discovery of the Mildenhall Treasure. Gordon Butcher, a ploughman, uncovers a vast hoard of Roman silver while working for a man named Ford. Ford tricks Butcher into believing that the find is worthless and takes it home for himself, but he gets his comeuppance when a visiting archaeologist recognises it as an unreported treasure trove.

It was first published in The Saturday Evening Post in the US in 1946 and was first published in book form in this collection. It was published as a single title edition in 1999 by Jonathan Cape, with illustrations by Ralph Steadman.

=== The Swan ===
Ernie, a loutish school bully, receives a rifle for his 15th birthday. He and a friend use it to shoot small birds before training it on the school swot, Peter Watson. At gunpoint, Peter is made to lie in the path of an oncoming train; he survives by sinking into the trackbed as the train passes. Next, the bullies take him to a duck pond and force him to act as their "retriever dog". The bird-loving Peter becomes incensed when Ernie kills a swan, and Ernie responds by promising to make it fly again. He accomplishes this by cutting the bird's wings off and tying them to Peter's arms, before forcing him to climb to the top of a weeping willow. Peter declines the bullies' invitation to jump, but a shot from Ernie's rifle hits him in the leg and knocks him off balance. As Peter struggles to keep himself aloft, he sees a bright light which seems to beckon him on. Letting go of the tree, he dives towards it, creating the image of an enormous swan flying over the village. He lands in the garden of his home, where his mother calls for help before cutting the wings from his arms.

=== The Wonderful Story of Henry Sugar ===
Henry Sugar, an independently wealthy man who enjoys gambling, finds and reads a doctor's report on a strange patient who called himself "The Man Who Sees Without Using His Eyes". The patient had the ability to see even after doctors had sealed the man's eyes shut and bandaged his head. The man was part of a circus act and used his ability to make money. The man had been interested in magic all his life, and studied with Yogi Hardawar in India, who taught him how to see through thin objects such as paper or playing cards, and to see around solid objects such as a wooden door if he is allowed a finger or hand around it. The doctors decide the man could be of great benefit as a teacher of the blind and return to the circus, only to find that The Man Who Sees Without Using His Eyes has died.

Henry realises that the man's book contains a detailed description of the meditation method used to gain this ability; he steals the book and then decides to try to learn it himself. After three years, Henry masters the ability to see through playing cards, and can even predict the future. Henry uses these abilities in a casino, where he becomes cognizant of other gamblers' greed. He uses his powers to predict which number will win on a roulette wheel and makes a great deal of money at the blackjack tables, but refrains from more feats in fear of publicity.

Henry wins enough money to buy a small house or a large automobile, but realises that the thrill of winning or losing has been eradicated by its ease. The next morning Henry has an acute revulsion towards the money and throws the money off his balcony. A near-riot breaks out as the people of London rush to collect the twenty pound notes falling from Henry's apartment. A police officer scolds Henry and suggests that he find a more legal form of charity, and Henry vows to establish the most well-equipped and supportive orphanages in the world. This plan works until he reaches Las Vegas, where he unknowingly collects a huge sum from three casinos owned by the same Mafioso and narrowly escapes the owner's thugs. Henry flies to Hollywood, where he enlists the aid of a famous makeup artist to create various disguises and false identities to protect himself. This works, and with the aid of his accountant and the artist he successfully travels the world under a number of names and identities. At the end of the story, the author reveals that he was selected, seemingly at random, by Henry's accountant to write Henry's story after his death. The narrator is shocked to hear all of the events, and comments that Henry's wish came true—the Henry Sugar Orphanages, established all across the Earth, are indeed the best in the world.

=== Lucky Break ===
This is a non-fictional account, similar to Roald Dahl's Boy and Going Solo albeit in a more concise form. It discusses the events in his life that led him to become a writer, including a meeting with a famous writer, who helped to launch his career. The story is about Dahl's school and all the teachers, until after the publication of his first story.

=== A Piece of Cake ===
This is an autobiographical account of Dahl's time as a fighter pilot in the Second World War, particularly the details of how Dahl was injured and eventually forced to leave the Mediterranean arena. The original version of the story was written for C. S. Forester so that he could get the gist of Dahl's story and rewrite it in his own words. Forester was so impressed by the story (Dahl at the time did not believe himself a capable writer) that he sent it without modification to his agent, who had it published (as "Shot Down Over Libya") in The Saturday Evening Post, thereby initiating Dahl's writing career. This short story was also published in one of Dahl's many collections of short stories Over to You which was first published in 1946. The traditional English nursery rhyme "Oranges and Lemons" makes an appearance in the story.

== Film adaptation ==
In January 2022, it was announced that Wes Anderson would direct an adaptation of "The Wonderful Story of Henry Sugar" with Benedict Cumberbatch as the titular character alongside Dev Patel, Ben Kingsley, Richard Ayoade, and Ralph Fiennes. It is distributed by Netflix and won for Best Live Action Short Film at the 96th Academy Awards. Anderson later announced that he would also adapt "The Swan" for Netflix, starring Rupert Friend, as well as two additional Dahl short stories, "Poison" and "The Ratcatcher". The latter three, as well as the 7 tips to write fiction as provided in "Lucky Break", are combined into The Wonderful Story of Henry Sugar and Three More.

== Editions ==
- ISBN 0-375-81423-X (hardcover, 2001)
- ISBN 0-435-12237-1 (hardcover, 1979)
- ISBN 0-224-01547-8 (hardcover, 1977)
- ISBN 0-14-130470-7 (paperback, 2000)
- ISBN 0-14-037348-9 (paperback, 1995)
- ISBN 0-14-032874-2 (paperback, 1988)
- ISBN 0-14-005773-0 (paperback, 1982)

== See also ==
- Boy (Book)
