= The French Dispatch =

2021 film by Wes Anderson

The French Dispatch of the Liberty, Kansas Evening Sun
- Theatrical release poster
- Directed by: Wes Anderson
- Screenplay by: Wes Anderson
- Story by: Wes Anderson; Roman Coppola; Hugo Guinness; Jason Schwartzman
- Produced by: Wes Anderson; Steven Rales; Jeremy Dawson
- Starring: Owen Wilson; Benicio del Toro; Tony Revolori; Adrien Brody; Tilda Swinton; Bob Balaban; Henry Winkler; Léa Seydoux; Frances McDormand; Timothée Chalamet; Lyna Khoudri; Christoph Waltz; Rupert Friend; Jeffrey Wright; Liev Schreiber; Mathieu Amalric; Stephen Park; Willem Dafoe; Edward Norton; Saoirse Ronan; Bill Murray; Elisabeth Moss; Jason Schwartzman; Fisher Stevens; Anjelica Huston
- Cinematography: Robert Yeoman
- Edited by: Andrew Weisblum
- Music by: Alexandre Desplat
- Production companies: Indian Paintbrush; American Empirical Pictures
- Distributed by: Searchlight Pictures
- Release dates: July 12, 2021 (Cannes); October 22, 2021 (United States)
- Running time: 108 minutes
- Country: United States
- Languages: English; French
- Budget: $25 million
- Box office: $46.3 million

The French Dispatch of the Liberty, Kansas Evening Sun (or simply The French Dispatch) is a 2021 American anthology comedy drama film written, directed, and co-produced by Wes Anderson from a story he conceived with Roman Coppola, Hugo Guinness, and Jason Schwartzman. It features an expansive ensemble cast and follows three different storylines as the French news bureau of the fictional Liberty, Kansas Evening Sun newspaper publishes its final issue.

The first segment, "The Concrete Masterpiece", follows an incarcerated and unstable painter, and stars Benicio del Toro, Adrien Brody, Tilda Swinton and Léa Seydoux. The second, "Revisions to a Manifesto", is inspired by the May 68 student protests, and stars Frances McDormand, Timothée Chalamet, and Lyna Khoudri. The third, "The Private Dining Room of the Police Commissioner", follows the kidnapping of a police commissioner's son and stars Jeffrey Wright, Mathieu Amalric, and Stephen Park. Bill Murray also stars as Arthur Howitzer Jr., the paper's editor, while Owen Wilson appears in a short segment that introduces the film's fictional setting of Ennui-sur-Blasé.

The project was first mentioned in August 2018 as an untitled musical set after World War II. That December, the film was officially announced, with Anderson calling it a "love letter to journalists". Filming took place between November 2018 and March 2019, with cinematographer Robert D. Yeoman, in the city of Angoulême, France. In post-production, editing was completed by Andrew Weisblum and the score was composed by Alexandre Desplat.

Following a delay from 2020, The French Dispatch premiered at the Cannes Film Festival on July 12, 2021, and was theatrically released in the United States by Searchlight Pictures on October 22, 2021. It received generally positive reviews, with praise for its score, production design, and performances. It has grossed $46 million worldwide against its budget of $25 million.

== Plot ==
In 1975, in the fictional French town of Ennui-sur-Blasé, (Note: From French, literally, "boredom on jaded".) Arthur Howitzer Jr., the editor of the magazine The French Dispatch, dies of a heart attack. According to the wishes expressed in his will, publication of the magazine is immediately suspended following one final farewell issue, in which four articles are published, along with an obituary.

=== The Cycling Reporter ===
Bicycle ridden by Herbsaint Sazerac (Owen Wilson) at the Design Museum in Kensington, London.

Herbsaint Sazerac delivers a cycling tour of Ennui-sur-Blasé, demonstrating several key areas such as the arcade, Le Sans Blague café and a pickpocket's alleyway. He compares the past and the present of each place, demonstrating how much and yet how little has changed in Ennui over time.

=== The Concrete Masterpiece ===
J. K. L. Berensen delivers a lecture at the art gallery of her former employer, Upshur "Maw" Clampette, in which she details the career of Moses Rosenthaler. Rosenthaler, a mentally disturbed artist serving a 50-year sentence in the Ennui prison for double murder, paints an abstract nude portrait of Simone, a guard with whom he develops a relationship. Julien Cadazio, an art dealer also serving time for tax evasion, is immediately taken by the painting and buys it despite Rosenthaler's protests. Upon his release, Cadazio convinces his family of art exhibitors to put it on display, and Rosenthaler soon becomes a sensation in the art world. Privately, Rosenthaler struggles with inspiration to the point of near-suicide, and devotes himself to a long-term project at Simone's challenging.

Three years later, Cadazio, his uncles, Clampette, Berensen, and a mob of artists inspired by Rosenthaler, all frustrated at the lack of further paintings, bribe their way into the prison to confront him, only to discover that his masterpiece is in fact a series of frescoes in the concrete prison hall. Angered that the paintings are irremovable from the prison, Cadazio gets into a physical altercation with Rosenthaler, but soon comes to appreciate the paintings for what they are, and later arranges for the entire wall to be airlifted out of the prison into a private museum in Kansas, owned by Clampette. For his actions in halting a prison riot that breaks out during the reveal of the paintings, Rosenthaler is released on probation. Simone also departs after earning a great sum of money for becoming the inspiration and motivation for Rosenthaler during his incarceration. Simone and Rosenthaler maintain correspondence following his release, but never see each other again.

=== Revisions to a Manifesto ===
Lucinda Krementz reports on a student protest breaking out in the streets of Ennui that soon boils over into the "Chessboard Revolution", so-called for the students using chess to communicate with the police. While the revolution initially is inspired by petty concerns over access to the girls' dormitory, the traumatic military conscription of one student, Mitch-Mitch, inspires greater uprising.

Despite her insistence on maintaining "journalistic neutrality," Krementz has a brief romance with Zeffirelli, a self-styled leader of the revolt, and secretly helps him write his manifesto and adds an appendix. Juliette, a fellow revolutionary, is unimpressed with his manifesto. After they briefly express their disagreement about its contents, Krementz discovers that Juliette is in fact infatuated with Zeffirelli and is jealous of her closeness with him. She then tells the two to "go make love," which they do.

A few weeks later, Zeffirelli dies attempting repairs on the tower of a revolutionary pirate radio station, and soon a photograph of his likeness becomes symbolic of the movement. Five years later, Krementz translates Mitch-Mitch's theatrical dramatization of his conscription, and Zeffirelli's death, for a National Playhouse production of his play (at the downstairs Knoblock Theatre).

=== The Private Dining Room of the Police Commissioner ===
During a television interview, Roebuck Wright recounts the story of his attending a private dinner with The Commissaire of the Ennui police force, prepared by legendary police officer/chef Lt. Nescaffier. Nescaffier is a famous specialist in a kind of haute cuisine specifically designed to be eaten by working police officers. The dinner is disrupted when the Commissaire's son Gigi is kidnapped and held for ransom by criminals, led by a failed musician labelled The Chauffeur.

The kidnappers represent the warring criminal syndicates of Ennui-sur-Blasé, and demand the release of an underworld accountant Albert, nicknamed "the Abacus", who possesses their shared financial records. The Abacus is being held in a solitary confinement cell at police headquarters. Wright recollects his own imprisonment in that same cell for his homosexuality, for which he was bailed out by Howitzer and offered a job at the Dispatch.

Following a shoot-out at the kidnapper's hideout, Gigi manages to sneak out a message in Morse code to "send the cook". Lt. Nescaffier is sent into the kidnappers' hideout, ostensibly to provide both them and Gigi with food, but secretly the food is laced with poison. The criminals all succumb to the poison except Gigi and The Chauffeur as neither ate the poisoned radishes, and Nescaffier just barely survives after willingly sampling the food to trick the criminals. The Chauffeur escapes with Gigi, and leads the police on a chase. Gigi manages to escape through the car's sunroof and reunites with his father. During his recovery, Nescaffier saves The Abacus from starving to death by preparing him an omelette, the prisoner having been totally forgotten in the commotion.

Back at the Dispatch office, Howitzer tells Wright to reinsert a deleted segment. In it, a recovering Nescaffier tells Wright that the taste of the poison was unlike anything he had ever eaten before, before they reflect on the state of being foreigners in France, and outsiders to society as a whole. Howitzer and Wright disagree on whether this conversation is the heart of the piece.

=== Decline and Death ===
In an epilogue, the French Dispatch staff mourn Howitzer's death, but set to work putting together a final issue to honor his memory.

During the closing credits, there is a dedication to the following writers and editors, many of whom were associated with The New Yorker: Harold Ross, William Shawn, Rosamond Bernier, Mavis Gallant, James Baldwin, A. J. Liebling, S. N. Behrman, Lillian Ross, Janet Flanner, Lucy Sante, James Thurber, Joseph Mitchell, Wolcott Gibbs, St. Clair McKelway, Ved Mehta, Brendan Gill, E. B. White, and Katharine White, and additionally to Christophe, writer of the featured song "Aline". Accompanying the credits are covers of the French Dispatch which are reminiscent of The New Yorker covers.

== Cast ==
=== The Cycling Reporter ===
- Owen Wilson as Herbsaint Sazerac, a travel writer and staff-member of the French Dispatch, based on Joseph Mitchell, a writer for The New Yorker.

=== The Concrete Masterpiece ===
- Benicio del Toro as Moses Rosenthaler, an imprisoned artist, loosely based on the incarcerated Mexican painter David Alfaro Siqueiros
  - Tony Revolori as young Rosenthaler
- Adrien Brody as Julien Cadazio, an art dealer, based on Lord Duveen
- Tilda Swinton as J. K. L. Berensen, a writer and staff-member of the French Dispatch, based on Rosamond Bernier
- Léa Seydoux as Simone, a prison guard and Rosenthaler's muse
- Bob Balaban as Uncle Nick, an uncle and business partner to Cadazio
- Henry Winkler as Uncle Joe, an uncle and business partner to Cadazio
- Lois Smith as Upshur "Maw" Clampette, an art collector
- Denis Menochet as Prison Guard
- Larry Pine as Chief Magistrate
- Morgane Polanski as Girlfriend
- Félix Moati as Head Caterer

=== Revisions to a Manifesto ===
- Frances McDormand as Lucinda Krementz, a journalist profiling the student revolutionaries, based on Mavis Gallant
- Timothée Chalamet as Zeffirelli, a student revolutionary
- Lyna Khoudri as Juliette, a student revolutionary
- Mohamed Belhadjine as Mitch-Mitch, a student revolutionary who is conscripted
  - Tom Hudson as an actor playing Mitch-Mitch on stage
- Nicolas Avinée as Vittel, a student revolutionary
- Christoph Waltz as Paul Duval, a friend of the B family
- Cécile de France as Mrs. B, Zeffirelli's mother
- Guillaume Gallienne as Mr. B, Zeffirelli's father
- Rupert Friend as Drill-Sergeant, an actor playing a soldier
- Alex Lawther as Morisot, an actor playing a despondent military recruit
- Toheeb Jimoh as Cadet #1, an actor playing a military recruit
- Lily Taleb as Juliette's friend, a student revolutionary
- Stéphane Bak as Communications Specialist for the police
- Jarvis Cocker as the singing voice of Tip-Top, a popular chanteur
- Bruno Delbonnel as the picture of François-Marie Charvet, a revolutionary

=== The Private Dining Room of the Police Commissioner ===
- Jeffrey Wright as Roebuck Wright, a food journalist based on an amalgamation of James Baldwin and A. J. Liebling
- Liev Schreiber as Talk Show Host, based on Dick Cavett
- Mathieu Amalric as Commissaire de la Vilatte, a policeman with a kidnapped son
- Stephen Park as Nescaffier, a chef and police officer who solves a kidnapping, whose name is a play on Auguste Escoffier and Nescafé
- Hippolyte Girardot as Chou-fleur, the Commissiare's oldest friend
- Willem Dafoe as Albert "the Abacus", a prisoner and underworld accountant
- Edward Norton as Chauffeur Joe Lefèvre, the head kidnapper
- Saoirse Ronan as Junkie / Showgirl #1, a member of the kidnapping gang
- Winsen Ait Hellal as Isadore Sharif "Gigi" de la Vilatte, the Commissaire's kidnapped son
- Mauricette Coudivat as Louise "Maman" de la Vilatte, the Commissiare's mother
- Damien Bonnard as Police Detective
- Rodolphe Pauly as Patrolman Marpassant
- Antonia Desplat as Junkie / Showgirl #2, a kidnapper

=== Obituary ===
- Bill Murray as Arthur Howitzer Jr., the editor of the French Dispatch, based on Harold Ross, the co-founder of The New Yorker
- Elisabeth Moss as Alumna, a copy editor of the French Dispatch staff
- Jason Schwartzman as Hermes Jones, a cartoonist and member of the French Dispatch staff
- Fisher Stevens as Story Editor
- Griffin Dunne as Legal Advisor
- Pablo Pauly as Waiter
- Wally Wolodarsky as Cheery Writer, who has never completed an article
- Anjelica Bette Fellini as Proofreader
- Anjelica Huston as the narrator

== Production ==
=== Background ===
The film has been described as "a love letter to journalists set at an outpost of an American newspaper in a fictional 20th-century French city", centering on four stories. It brings to life a collection of tales published in the eponymous The French Dispatch, based in the fictional French city of Ennui-sur-Blasé. The film is inspired by Wes Anderson's love of The New Yorker, and some characters and events in the film are based on real-life equivalents from the magazine. Arthur Howitzer Jr., the Kansas-born editor of the Dispatch, was based on The New Yorker founding editor Harold Ross, who came from Colorado. A. J. Liebling served as a secondary inspiration for the character. The character Herbsaint Sazerac was inspired by The New Yorker writer Joseph Mitchell. The food journalist Roebuck Wright was based on an amalgamation of James Baldwin, Liebling and Tennessee Williams. The story "Revisions to a Manifesto" was inspired by Mavis Gallant's two-part article "The Events in May: A Paris Notebook", centering on the May 68 student protests. "The Concrete Masterpiece" was inspired by the 1951 feature "The Days of Duveen", a six-part profile on art dealer Lord Duveen, upon which the character Julien Cadazio (played by Adrien Brody) is modeled. The character Upshur "Maw" Clampette was based on art collector Dominique de Menil, and J.K.L. Berensen was inspired by art lecturer Rosamond Bernier.

When speaking to French publication La Charente Libre in April 2019, Anderson said: "The story is not easy to explain . . . [It's about an] American journalist based in France [who] creates his magazine. It is more a portrait of this man, of this journalist who fights to write what he wants to write. It's not a movie about freedom of the press, but when you talk about reporters you also talk about what's going on in the real world."

=== Development and casting ===
In August 2018, it was reported Anderson would write and direct an untitled musical film set in France, post World War II. In November 2018, it was announced Jeremy Dawson would produce the film, with Tilda Swinton and Mathieu Amalric starring in the film. Dawson also confirmed the film is not a musical. Additionally, Natalie Portman, Brad Pitt, and Léa Seydoux were rumored for roles in the film. In December 2018, it was announced Anderson would write and direct the film, with Frances McDormand, Bill Murray, Benicio del Toro, and Jeffrey Wright; Seydoux was confirmed to star in the film alongside Swinton and Amalric, with Steven Rales producing under his Indian Paintbrush banner and Fox Searchlight Pictures distributing. Timothée Chalamet's role was written with him in mind.

Later that month, Lois Smith and Saoirse Ronan joined the cast. In January 2019, Owen Wilson, Adrien Brody, Henry Winkler, Willem Dafoe, Bob Balaban, Steve Park, Denis Ménochet, Lyna Khoudri, Alex Lawther, Félix Moati, Benjamin Lavernhe, Guillaume Gallienne, and Cécile de France were cast. Robert D. Yeoman served as the film's cinematographer. In February 2019, it was announced Wally Wolodarsky, Fisher Stevens, Griffin Dunne, and Jason Schwartzman had joined the cast of the film. In April 2019, Christoph Waltz, Rupert Friend, and Elisabeth Moss were cast. Initially, Kate Winslet was also part of the cast, but had to exit the project to prepare for her next role in Ammonite.

=== Filming ===
Principal photography began in November 2018, in the city of Angoulême in southwestern France and wrapped in March 2019. Murray and Ronan, who had small roles, recorded their scenes in two days.

=== Cinematography ===
Director of photography Robert Yeoman shot The French Dispatch on 35 mm film using Kodak Vision3 200T 5213 for the color sequences, and Eastman Double-X 5222 for the black-and-white sequences, on Arricam Studio and Lite cameras provided by a studio in Paris. Anderson preferred classic methods for shooting the scenes. Accordingly, the crew used scaffolding and hauled equipment on ropes, rather than a Technocrane; and golf carts for transporting cameras, rather than camera cars. Most scenes were framed in 1.37:1 format (also known as Academy ratio), which Anderson used in his The Grand Budapest Hotel, and which was used for many of the French films that inspired The French Dispatch. Occasional scenes were shot in anamorphic format "mainly to make a bold dramatic statement", according to Yeoman. French New Wave films were primary sources of inspiration for Yeoman's lighting; In Cold Blood (1967, shot by Conrad Hall) was another major reference.

The animated segments were directed by Gwenn Germain, who previously worked on Anderson's Isle of Dogs. As a nod to Angoulême's comic heritage, they were done entirely by local illustrators. The team comprised a maximum of 15 people, with The Adventures of Tintin and Blake and Mortimer as their main inspirations. They took about seven months to complete. The visual effects were done by the UK-based company Koala FX.

=== Set design ===
Adam Stockhausen was responsible for the production design of The French Dispatch. He and his team began the scouting process using Google Maps, looking for promising locations before visiting them in person. Stockhausen and Anderson envisioned a town which "felt like Paris but not as it is today – more a sort of memory of Paris, the Paris of Jacques Tati." The team eventually settled on Angoulême. Stockhausen estimates that over 125 sets were constructed, most of them on location around Angoulême. A former felt factory was converted into a makeshift movie studio for the crew. A real building in Angoulême was chosen as the basis for the Dispatch headquarters, enhanced with foreground sets and miniatures in order to create the symmetry typically seen in Anderson films.

Rena DeAngelo was The French Dispatch's set decorator. DeAngelo and Anderson sought inspiration from French films such as The Red Balloon, The 400 Blows, Bande à part and Vivre sa vie, and researched an extensive photo collection of Paris from the mid-1800s through the 1960s in order to "get a feeling of Paris when it was dirtier—still beautiful, but grimy." DeAngelo and her team sourced the furniture for Le Sans Blague café from various places in Paris, and the coffee cups were specially made in Limoges, a city famous for its porcelain. She also shopped once a month during filming at prop houses and flea markets in Le Mans, from which she sourced the furniture for Roebuck Wright's office. Much of the rest of the film's furniture came from a local estate liquidator in Angoulême.

Rosenthaler's abstract paintings were created by the German-New Zealand visual artist (and Tilda Swinton's partner) Sandro Kopp in a three-month-long process. Kopp cited the works of Frank Auerbach, Willem de Kooning, and Francis Bacon as references, while insisting that the paintings must be "idiosyncratic", and would not "look too much like the work of any living or dead painter". He relocated to the French Dispatch set in Angoulême to create the paintings, working in the on-set studio. Kopp also served as Tony Revolori's hand-double for the scenes where the young Rosenthaler is seen painting.

=== Magazine covers ===
Catalonian-based illustrator Javi Aznarez drew from his own imagination and memories to design the covers for this movie, which were made to look like The New Yorker-style magazine covers.

=== Music ===
For the film's musical score, Wes Anderson teamed up with his long-time collaborators Alexandre Desplat and Randall Poster. Desplat enlisted pianist Jean-Yves Thibaudet and drew inspiration from composers Erik Satie and Thelonious Monk to pair him in unusual duos, such as with a harp, timpani, bassoon, or tuba. Recording took place remotely due to the COVID-19 pandemic. The film's soundtrack album was released on CD and digitally on October 22, 2021, by ABKCO Records, with a vinyl release planned for early 2022. The only single from the film's soundtrack album, titled "Obituary", was released on September 14, 2021. The film's musical score was given a separate, earlier, release.

== Release ==
=== Premiere and theatrical release ===
In September 2019, Searchlight Pictures (then-named Fox Searchlight Pictures) acquired distribution rights to the film. It was set to premiere at the Cannes Film Festival on May 12, 2020, and get a wide release on July 24, but due to the COVID-19 pandemic, the festival was cancelled and the film was pulled from the schedule on April 3, 2020. The film was rescheduled for release on October 16, 2020, before being pulled from the schedule again on July 23, 2020.

The French Dispatch had its world premiere at the 2021 Cannes Film Festival. It was screened at film festivals in Busan, the Hamptons, London, Mill Valley, Montclair, New York City, Twin Cities, Philadelphia, Wrocław, San Diego, and Zürich. There was a surprise screening at the Telluride Film Festival. The film was released in limited theaters on October 22, 2021, and received a wide release on October 29, 2021.

=== Home media ===
The French Dispatch was released digitally on December 14, 2021, followed by a Blu-ray and DVD release on December 28, by Walt Disney Studios Home Entertainment. It was released on Blu-ray in the UK as an HMV exclusive on 3 April 2023. It was released on Ultra HD Blu-ray by Criterion on September 30, 2025, as part of the ten film collection The Wes Anderson Archive: Ten Films, Twenty-Five Years and as a standalone disc.

=== Promotion ===
To promote the film, pop-up exhibitions with recreations of sets from the film emerged in Los Angeles, New York, and London for a limited time around the film's release date. The London pop-up sported the storefront of the Le Sans Blague café's storefront, and housed several props from the film, including costumes, and Rosenthaler's mural.

== Reception ==
=== Box office ===
The French Dispatch grossed $16.1 million in the United States and Canada, and $30.2 million in other territories, for a worldwide total of $46.3 million.

In its limited opening weekend, the film grossed $1.3 million from 52 theaters, for a per-venue average of $25,000, which was the best per-venue performance for a theatrically-released film up to that point of the COVID-19 pandemic; the following month, Licorice Pizza had a per-venue average of $86,289 in 4 theaters. The film expanded to 788 theaters the following weekend, and grossed $2.75 million. It continued to expand in its third weekend, making $2.6 million from 1,205 theaters.

=== Critical response ===
On the review aggregator website Rotten Tomatoes, 75% of 320 critics' reviews are positive. The website's consensus reads: "A loving ode to the spirit of journalism, The French Dispatch will be most enjoyed by fans of Wes Anderson's meticulously arranged aesthetic." Metacritic, which uses a weighted average, assigned the film a score of 74 out of 100, based on 57 critics, indicating "generally favorable" reviews.

David Rooney of The Hollywood Reporter praised the film's "hand-crafted visual delights and eccentric performances", and wrote: "While The French Dispatch might seem like an anthology of vignettes without a strong overarching theme, every moment is graced by Anderson's love for the written word and the oddball characters who dedicate their professional lives to it". Writing for The Guardian, Peter Bradshaw said: "It might not be at the very zenith of what he can achieve but for sheer moment-by-moment pleasure, and for laughs, this is a treat".

The French Dispatch was included in lists of the best films of the year from The New Yorker (#1), The Forward (the best movie), Cahiers du Cinéma (#6) IndieWire (#6), Esquire (#38), New Musical Express (#11), British Film Institute (#23) and Vogue (unlisted).

=== Accolades ===
Award	Date of ceremony	Category	Recipient(s)	Result	Ref.
ACE Eddie Awards	March 5, 2022	Best Edited Feature Film (Comedy)	Andrew Weisblum	Nominated	
Alliance of Women Film Journalists Awards	January 25, 2022	Best Ensemble Cast – Casting Director(s)	Douglas Aibel and Antoinette Boulat	Nominated	
Art Directors Guild Awards	March 5, 2022	Excellence in Production Design for a Period Film	Adam Stockhausen	Nominated	
Artios Awards	March 23, 2022	Outstanding Achievement in Casting – Big Budget Comedy	Douglas Aibel and Matthew Glasner	Nominated	
Austin Film Critics Association Awards	January 11, 2022	Best Supporting Actor	Jeffrey Wright	Nominated	
Austin Film Critics Association Awards	January 11, 2022	Best Ensemble	The French Dispatch	Won	
Austin Film Critics Association Awards	January 11, 2022	Best Original Screenplay	Wes Anderson	Nominated	
Black Reel Awards	February 28, 2022	Outstanding Supporting Actor	Jeffrey Wright	Nominated	
British Academy Film Awards	March 13, 2022	Best Original Score	Alexandre Desplat	Nominated	
British Academy Film Awards	March 13, 2022	Best Production Design	Adam Stockhausen and Rena DeAngelo	Nominated	
British Academy Film Awards	March 13, 2022	Best Costume Design	Milena Canonero	Nominated	
Chicago Film Critics Association Awards	December 15, 2021	Best Supporting Actor	Jeffrey Wright	Nominated	
Chicago Film Critics Association Awards	December 15, 2021	Best Original Screenplay	Wes Anderson	Nominated	
Chicago Film Critics Association Awards	December 15, 2021	Best Original Score	Alexandre Desplat	Nominated	
Chicago Film Critics Association Awards	December 15, 2021	Best Art Direction/Production Design	Adam Stockhausen and Rena DeAngelo	Won	
Chicago Film Critics Association Awards	December 15, 2021	Best Editing	Andrew Weisblum	Won	
Critics' Choice Movie Awards	March 13, 2022	Best Comedy	The French Dispatch	Nominated	
Critics' Choice Movie Awards	March 13, 2022	Best Production Design	Adam Stockhausen and Rena DeAngelo	Nominated	
Dallas–Fort Worth Film Critics Association Awards	December 20, 2021	Best Film	The French Dispatch	Runner-up	
Detroit Film Critics Society Awards	December 6, 2021	Best Ensemble	The French Dispatch	Won	
Detroit Film Critics Society Awards	December 6, 2021	Best Original Screenplay	Wes Anderson	Nominated	
Florida Film Critics Circle Awards	December 22, 2021	Best Original Screenplay	Wes Anderson	Won	
Florida Film Critics Circle Awards	December 22, 2021	Best Score	Alexandre Desplat	Nominated	
Georgia Film Critics Association Awards	January 14, 2022	Best Production Design	Adam Stockhausen and Rena DeAngelo	Nominated	
Golden Globe Awards	January 9, 2022	Best Original Score	Alexandre Desplat	Nominated	
Golden Trailer Awards	October 6, 2022	Most Original TV Spot	The French Dispatch (for "Tune In")	Nominated	
Hollywood Critics Association Awards	February 28, 2022	Best Score	Alexandre Desplat	Nominated	
Hollywood Critics Association Awards	February 28, 2022	Best Production Design	Adam Stockhausen and Rena DeAngelo	Nominated	
Hollywood Music in Media Awards	November 17, 2021	Best Original Score in a Feature Film	Alexandre Desplat	Nominated	
Houston Film Critics Society Awards	January 19, 2022	Best Original Score	Alexandre Desplat	Nominated	
International Film Music Critics Association Awards	February 17, 2022	Best Original Score for a Comedy Film	Alexandre Desplat	Nominated	
London Film Critics' Circle Awards	February 6, 2022	Screenwriter of the Year	Wes Anderson	Nominated	
London Film Critics' Circle Awards	February 6, 2022	Supporting Actor of the Year	Jeffrey Wright	Nominated	
London Film Critics' Circle Awards	February 6, 2022	Technical Achievement Award	Adam Stockhausen	Nominated	
London Film Critics' Circle Awards	February 6, 2022	British/Irish Actress of the Year	Tilda Swinton	Won	
Online Film Critics Society Awards	January 24, 2022	Best Supporting Actor	Jeffrey Wright	Nominated	
Online Film Critics Society Awards	January 24, 2022	Best Original Score	Alexandre Desplat	Nominated	
Online Film Critics Society Awards	January 24, 2022	Best Production Design	Adam Stockhausen and Rena DeAngelo	Won	
Online Film Critics Society Awards	January 24, 2022	Best Costume Design	Milena Canonero	Nominated	
San Diego Film Critics Society Awards	January 10, 2022	Best Production Design	Adam Stockhausen and Rena DeAngelo	Runner-up	
San Francisco Bay Area Film Critics Circle Awards	January 10, 2022	Best Original Score	Alexandre Desplat	Nominated	
San Francisco Bay Area Film Critics Circle Awards	January 10, 2022	Best Cinematography	Robert Yeoman	Nominated	
San Francisco Bay Area Film Critics Circle Awards	January 10, 2022	Best Production Design	Adam Stockhausen and Rena DeAngelo	Nominated	
Satellite Awards	April 2, 2022	Best Motion Picture – Comedy or Musical	The French Dispatch	Nominated	
Satellite Awards	April 2, 2022	Best Original Score	Alexandre Desplat	Nominated	
Satellite Awards	April 2, 2022	Best Art Direction and Production Design	Adam Stockhausen and Rena DeAngelo	Nominated	
Seattle Film Critics Society Awards	January 17, 2022	Best Actor in a Supporting Role	Jeffrey Wright	Nominated	
Seattle Film Critics Society Awards	January 17, 2022	Best Original Score	Alexandre Desplat	Nominated	
Seattle Film Critics Society Awards	January 17, 2022	Best Production Design	Adam Stockhausen and Rena DeAngelo	Nominated	
Set Decorators Society of America Awards	February 22, 2022	Best Achievement in Decor/Design of a Comedy or Musical Feature Film	Adam Stockhausen and Rena DeAngelo	Won	
St. Louis Film Critics Association Awards	December 19, 2021	Best Comedy Film	The French Dispatch	Nominated	
St. Louis Film Critics Association Awards	December 19, 2021	Best Director	Wes Anderson	Nominated	
St. Louis Film Critics Association Awards	December 19, 2021	Best Ensemble	The French Dispatch	Nominated	
St. Louis Film Critics Association Awards	December 19, 2021	Best Production Design	Adam Stockhausen	Won	
Washington D.C. Area Film Critics Association Awards	December 6, 2021	Best Acting Ensemble	The French Dispatch	Nominated	
Washington D.C. Area Film Critics Association Awards	December 6, 2021	Best Score	Alexandre Desplat	Nominated	
Washington D.C. Area Film Critics Association Awards	December 6, 2021	Best Editing	Andrew Weisblum	Nominated	
Washington D.C. Area Film Critics Association Awards	December 6, 2021	Best Production Design	Adam Stockhausen and Rena DeAngelo	Nominated	
Writers Guild of America Awards	March 20, 2022	Best Original Screenplay	Wes Anderson, Hugo Guinness, Roman Coppola, and Jason Schwartzman	Nominated	

== See also ==
- Chansons d'Ennui Tip-Top, companion album to the film's soundtrack by Jarvis Cocker
