= Andrew Weisblum =

American film and visual effects editor

- Occupations: Film editor; Visual effects editor

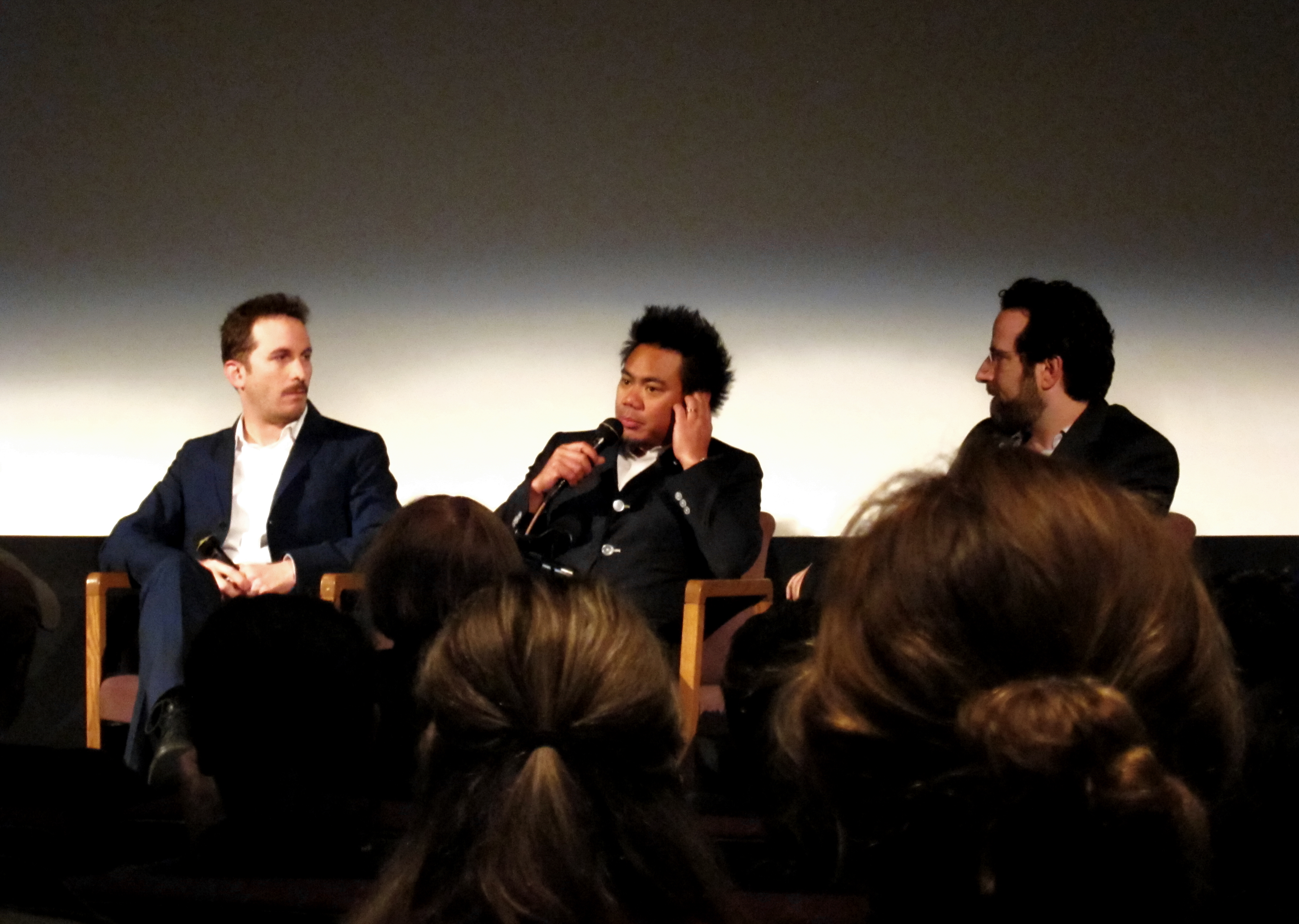
Weisblum with Aranofsky and Libatique, 2011

Andrew Weisblum is an American film and visual effects editor. He has collaborated frequently with directors Darren Aronofsky and Wes Anderson. Weisblum was nominated for two American Cinema Editors Eddie Awards for Best Edited Animated Feature Film, for his work on Fantastic Mr. Fox (2009) and Isle of Dogs (2018); and two Academy Awards for Best Film Editing, for his work on Black Swan (2010) and Tick, Tick... Boom! (2021, with co-editor Myron Kerstein).

== Filmography ==
Visual effects editor

- Chicago (2002)
- The Fountain (2006)

Film editor

- Coney Island Baby (2003)
- Undermind (2003)
- Broken English (2007)
- Dear Lemon Lima (2007) – short film and precursor to feature film Dear Lemon Lima
- The Darjeeling Limited (2007)
- The Wrestler (2008)
- Fantastic Mr. Fox (2009) – supervising editor
- Black Swan (2010)
- Moonrise Kingdom (2012)
- The East (2013) – worked with Bill Pankow
- Noah (2014)
- Alice Through the Looking Glass (2016)
- Mother! (2017)
- Isle of Dogs (2018)
- The Eyes of Tammy Faye (2021)
- The French Dispatch (2021)
- tick, tick... Boom! (2021)
- The Good Nurse (2022)
- The Whale (2022)
- The Wonderful Story of Henry Sugar (2023)
- Wolfs (2024)
- Caught Stealing (2025)
- Narnia: The Magician's Nephew (2027)
