= Barney Pilling =

British television and film editor

Barney Pilling is a British television and film editor. Some of Pilling's TV projects include Spooks, Life on Mars, No Angels, Hotel Babylon and As If. He was nominated for the Academy Award for Best Film Editing for the 2014 film The Grand Budapest Hotel.

His past film projects include Miss Pettigrew Lives for a Day, An Education, Never Let Me Go, and One Day.

He grew up in North Manchester and attended Bolton School. He worked as a DJ before moving into editing.

== Filmography ==
- An Education (2009)
- Never Let Me Go (2010)
- One Day (2011)
- Quartet (2012)
- The Grand Budapest Hotel (2014)
- A Long Way Down (2014)
- Asthma (2014)
- Suffragette (2015)
- Annihilation (2018)
- The White Crow (2018)
- Asteroid City (2023)
- The Wonderful Story of Henry Sugar (2023)
- The Phoenician Scheme (2025)
- Panic Carefully (2027)
