= Asteroid City =

2023 film by Wes Anderson

- Theatrical release poster
- Directed by: Wes Anderson
- Screenplay by: Wes Anderson
- Story by: Wes Anderson; Roman Coppola
- Produced by: Wes Anderson; Steven Rales; Jeremy Dawson
- Starring: Jason Schwartzman; Scarlett Johansson; Tom Hanks; Jeffrey Wright; Tilda Swinton; Bryan Cranston; Edward Norton; Adrien Brody; Liev Schreiber; Hope Davis; Stephen Park; Rupert Friend; Maya Hawke; Steve Carell; Matt Dillon; Hong Chau; Willem Dafoe; Margot Robbie; Tony Revolori; Jake Ryan; Jeff Goldblum
- Cinematography: Robert Yeoman
- Edited by: Barney Pilling
- Music by: Alexandre Desplat
- Production companies: Indian Paintbrush; American Empirical Pictures
- Distributed by: Focus Features (United States); Universal Pictures International (international)
- Release dates: May 23, 2023 (Cannes); June 16, 2023 (United States)
- Running time: 105 minutes
- Country: United States
- Language: English
- Budget: $25 million
- Box office: $54 million

Asteroid City (stylized in all caps) is a 2023 American science fiction comedy drama film written, directed, and produced by Wes Anderson, from a story he developed with Roman Coppola. The ensemble cast includes Jason Schwartzman, Scarlett Johansson, Tom Hanks, Jeffrey Wright, Tilda Swinton, Bryan Cranston, Edward Norton, Adrien Brody, Liev Schreiber, Hope Davis, Steve Park, Rupert Friend, Maya Hawke, Steve Carell, Matt Dillon, Hong Chau, Willem Dafoe, Margot Robbie, Tony Revolori, Jake Ryan, and Jeff Goldblum. Its plot mostly presents a stage play set in a retrofuturistic version of 1955, which follows a Junior Stargazer convention and the unexpected arrival of extraterrestrials and UFOs to the titular town in the American Southwestern desert, which is in close proximity to atomic test sites created after World War II. The play is contextualized through a television documentary following the creation of the show itself, adding a layer of metatextuality.

The project was announced in September 2020 as an untitled romance film, with Anderson writing, producing and directing, alongside Jeremy Dawson of American Empirical Pictures and Steven Rales of Indian Paintbrush. In February 2021, it was described as being about a "group of brainy teenagers". Originally set for Rome, filming took place in Chinchón, Spain, between August and October, 2021, with cinematographer Robert D. Yeoman. Several sets resembling a desert landscape and a mock train station were used. Post-production included editor Barney Pilling and a musical score composed by frequent Anderson composer Alexandre Desplat, featuring country and western songs from many artists. The official title for Asteroid City was revealed in October 2021 at the BFI London Film Festival.

Asteroid City premiered at the 76th Cannes Film Festival on May 23, 2023, where it competed for the Palme d'Or. It began a limited theatrical release through Focus Features in the United States on June 16, 2023, expanding to a wide release a week later. It grossed $54 million worldwide on a $25 million budget, and received generally positive reviews.

== Plot ==
Throughout the film, the action is split between showing a television special documenting the behind-the-scenes creation of a new play and a presentation of the play itself. The play's events are depicted in widescreen and stylized color, while the television special is seen in black-and-white Academy ratio.

=== "Asteroid City," The Play ===
Set in a retro-futuristic version of September, 1955, the play follows an annual Junior Stargazer astronomy convention being held in the fictional, titular desert town somewhere in the American Southwest. The town's claim to fame is the impact crater and remnants of a meteorite left behind from contact with a meteor in 3007 B.C. Nuclear atom bomb tests also occur regularly nearby.

==== Act 1: Friday morning, 7:00 am ====
War photojournalist Augie Steenbeck arrives to Asteroid City with Woodrow, his intellectual teenage son, and his three younger daughters, in their car which has broken down. After a mechanic informs them that there's no hope for their car due to an unexplained piece of machinery gone rogue, Augie phones his father-in-law, Stanley, asking for his help. Stanley, who dislikes his son-in-law, persuades him to tell the children about their mother's recent death, which Augie had concealed. When he informs his children of her passing, the girls decide that they want to bury her ashes in Asteroid City, much against Stanley's wishes. Augie and Woodrow meet Midge Campbell, a famous but world-weary film actress, and her daughter Dinah, who, like Woodrow, will be honored at the convention. The other convention participants arrive: Five-star General, Grif Gibson; his aide-de-camp; astronomer, Dr. Hickenlooper; three additional teenaged honorees - Clifford, Shelly, and Ricky; their parents - J.J., Sandy, and Roger; A busload of elementary-school children chaperoned by young teacher, June Douglas; A band of cowboys led by singer, Montana, who get stuck at the convention after missing their bus. A local motel provides everyone's accommodations.

Gibson welcomes the attendees at the Arid Plains Crater where the teenagers are to receive awards for various inventions. Afterwards, the characters all get to know each other better, namely Augie and Midge who are cabin neighbors and begin a romantic relationship as they interact through their windows. Later that night, while the convention guests are observing an astronomical ellipsis, a UFO suddenly appears above the crater; an alien emerges and steals the remnant of the meteorite that created the crater. Augie manages to photograph the creature before it leaves immediately after.

==== Act 2: The next day ====
Gibson, with instructions from the President, has placed the town under a strict military quarantine, and everyone is subjected to medical and psychiatric examinations. The President has also instructed that no word of the events should get out to the public and to convince the witnesses that what they saw was not real. Meanwhile, a romance blossoms between Montana and June, who assure the students that the alien is likely peaceful. Dinah and Woodrow also develop romantic feelings after bonding over their shared quirks. Meanwhile, J.J. asks Clifford, his son, why he feels the need to always be dared to do something, which Clifford has a habit of doing. He replies that perhaps it is because he is "afraid, otherwise nobody will notice [his] existence in the universe." Woodrow protests to Augie and Stanley that they should not be so calm about what has happened and questions what the meaning of life is, if there even is one. Meanwhile, Stanley tells Augie that he and his kids are welcome to stay with him for as long as necessary, for his love for his daughter and grandchildren outweigh his dislike of Augie. The Stargazer honorees use Dr. Hickenlooper's equipment to attempt to contact the alien. Tricking the guard watching the pay phone, Ricky calls his school newspaper to relay the quarantine details and cover-up to the outside world.

==== Act 3: 1 week later ====
(As Earp explains it, in the third act, "our cast of characters' already tenuous grasp of reality has further slipped in quarantine, and the group begins to occupy a space of the most peculiar emotional dimensions. Meanwhile, the information blockade spearheaded by General Griff Gibson has been, it appears, incomplete.")

The extraterrestrial events have become national news and Asteroid City has transformed into a tourist attraction. A furious Gibson threatens Ricky with arrest due to treason. June, once again, attempts to hold a normal class with her students, though it is derailed by her student Dwight, who performs an ode to the alien with the help of Montana and his band. Augie and Midge rehearse a scene from her upcoming film and when she asks him to employ his grief, he becomes overwrought with emotion and burns his hand on his quickie-griddle, causing Mercedes (as Midge) to momentarily break character. Dr. Hickenlooper follows up with the Stargazers about their attempts to interact with the alien and, privately, tells Woodrow that he should always continue to follow his curiosity and asks him to be her protégé. General Gibson assembles an emergency assembly with the town residents and informs them that the quarantine has been lifted when suddenly, the UFO reappears, dropping the meteorite back into its former position; the General sees new markings on it and deduces that it has been "inventoried." Gibson then reinstates the quarantine; the children, scientists, and parents revolt, using the honorees' inventions to overpower the military, and chaos ensues.

==== Epilogue ====
Augie wakes up the next morning to find everyone gone from Asteroid City, and he is informed by the motel manager that the quarantine was lifted after all. Stanley accepts his granddaughters' wishes to leave their mother's remains in Asteroid City. As the family is leaving town, Woodrow reveals he has won the fellowship funding and intends to use the funds on Dinah. Augie also learns that Midge has left him her mailing address. Afterwards, Augie and his family quietly drive away as another atom bomb is tested in the distance.

=== The Television Documentary ===
A television host of a 1950s WXYZ TV program introduces a documentary about the creation and production of Asteroid City, a fictional play by famed Western playwright Conrad Earp, which has been created for the program, specifically, to show the inner-workings of mounting a theatrical production. The documentary opens on the first day of rehearsals at the fictional Tarkington Theatre, at a read-through of the play, with Earp reading the opening stage directions aloud to the whole company. He introduces the primary cast of characters and the scenography present.

Later, a scene depicts a private audition held between Earp and actor Jones Hall, who will go on to play Augie. They discuss the themes of the play (namely why Augie burns his hand on the quickie-griddle) and, after Hall performs one of Steenback's monologues, they share a kiss, establishing their relationship as lovers. Another scene set the night before the play's opening night shows Woodrow's understudy on a train trying to convince Mercedes Ford (who plays Midge) to return to the production after she left due to a fight with Schubert Green, the director, to which she eventually agrees. Next, the special introduces the audience to Green, who is living in a makeshift apartment backstage at the theater due to his recent separation from his wife. His wife, Polly, arrives delivering their son's report card to sign (though Green at first believes it to be divorce papers) and gives him one last piece of advice for how to block a scene in the play, before leaving him, perhaps for the last time.

Moving back in time to the time when Earp was still writing the play, the next scene shows the playwright visiting an acting school for assistance in constructing the third act. The class contains many of the performers who will later appear in the shown production of Asteroid City. When asked what the play is about, Earp answers with "infinity and I don't know what else."

At the end of the third act (during the filmed live performance of the play), Jones Hall unexpectedly exits the stage and confronts Green, telling him that he "still doesn't understand the play", and asks if he is "doing him right" (delivered directly to camera). Green tells Hall to keep playing Augie the same way despite being uncertain, and that he is doing him right, and that what is really important is to "keep telling the story." After that interaction, while taking a smoke break on a balcony, Hall runs into the actress who was cast to play Augie's wife before her only scene was cut. She recites the deleted scene's dialogue to him, and he appears to gain new insight from it.

In the host's final appearance, he informs the audience that six months into the run of the play, Conrad Earp died in a car crash, and the special returns to the scene at the acting school, where Jones Hall blurts out the phrase "You can't wake up if you don't fall asleep." As each actor repeats this line staring into the camera, their world is briefly shown in color, and the alien appears one last time, holding the meteorite.

== Cast ==
- Jason Schwartzman as
  - Augie Steenbeck, a war photojournalist and Woodrow's father
  - Jones Hall, the actor playing Steenbeck
- Scarlett Johansson as
  - Midge Campbell, a famous but disillusioned actress and Dinah's mother
  - Mercedes Ford, the actress playing Campbell
- Tom Hanks as Stanley Zak, Augie's father-in-law who dislikes him
- Jeffrey Wright as General Grif Gibson, a Five-star general who serves as the host of the Junior Stargazer convention
- Tilda Swinton as Dr. Hickenlooper, a scientist at a local observatory
- Bryan Cranston as the unnamed host of an anthology television series that the production is being broadcast on
- Edward Norton as Conrad Earp, a legendary playwright of Westerns
- Adrien Brody as Schubert Green, a director who is in charge of the televised production
- Liev Schreiber as J.J. Kellogg, Clifford's father
- Hope Davis as Sandy Borden, Shelly's mother
- Stephen Park as
  - Roger Cho, Ricky's father
  - Linus Mao, the actor playing Cho
- Rupert Friend as
  - Montana, a singing cowboy interested in June
  - Asquith Eden, the actor playing Montana
- Maya Hawke as
  - June Douglas, a young schoolteacher who is interested in Montana
  - Lucretia Shaver, the actress playing Douglas
- Steve Carell as a motel manager
- Matt Dillon as
  - A mechanic
  - Walter Geronimo, the actor playing the mechanic
- Hong Chau as Polly, Schubert's wife
- Willem Dafoe as Saltzburg Keitel, a revered and extremely dedicated acting teacher
- Margot Robbie as
  - Steenbeck's deceased wife and Zak's daughter
  - the actress playing the wife
- Tony Revolori as Gen. Gibson's aide-de-camp
- Jake Ryan as
  - Woodrow, Steenbeck's son and Zak's grandson, and a Junior Stargazer winner
  - the understudy for the character of Woodrow who later is promoted to take on the role full-time
- Grace Edwards as Dinah, Midge's daughter, and a Junior Stargazer awardee who develops a relationship with Woodrow
- Aristou Meehan as Clifford, J.J.'s son, and a Junior Stargazer awardee
- Sophia Lillis as Shelly, Sandy's daughter, and a Junior Stargazer awardee
- Ethan Josh Lee as Ricky, Roger's son, and a Junior Stargazer awardee who reports on the alien
- Jeff Goldblum as the alien
- Kim Keukeleire as the puppeteer for the alien
- Fisher Stevens as Detective 1
- Rita Wilson as Mrs. Weatherford
- Jarvis Cocker as a cowboy
- Bob Balaban as Larkings Executive
- Seu Jorge as a cowboy
- Deanna Dunagan as a waitress

== Production ==
=== Development and casting ===
In September 2020, it was reported Wes Anderson would write and direct a romance film, which he would produce with Jeremy Dawson of American Empirical Pictures and Steven Rales of Indian Paintbrush. By February 2021, Michael Cera and Jeff Goldblum entered negotiations to star; the film was then described as being about a "group of brainy teenagers". Cera ultimately did not join the cast, but went on to star in Anderson's next film. Tilda Swinton was the first person to officially join the cast, in June 2021. In May 2023, Anderson talked about how the COVID-19 pandemic inspired the film and its story, saying: "I don't think there would be a quarantine in the story if we weren't experiencing it. It wasn't deliberate...Writing is the most improvisational part of the whole process. It relies on having nothing."

Bill Murray was originally cast as the motel manager, but had to drop out of the role due to being infected with COVID-19, leading to Steve Carell playing the part instead. Asteroid City is therefore the first Anderson film since his feature-length debut, 1996's Bottle Rocket, to not feature a performance from Murray. However, after Murray's recovery, he arrived at the film set in Spain, and while Anderson could not add another role to the film, he gave Murray the role of Tab Whitney, the actor playing Jock Larkings, business titan of the company bearing his name, which was an additional character created for a short promotional film trailer.

=== Filming ===
Principal photography, originally planned for Rome, took place in Spain between August and October 2021, with COVID-19 safety precautions in place. Several sets were built in Chinchón, including a vast diorama resembling a desert landscape with the eponymous town of Asteroid City, including its train station, a diner, a garage and an observatory. Cast member Fisher Stevens said the film would include "the wildest cast since The Bridge on the River Kwai" and that the cast and crew "were all bubbled together in a hotel, which was an old monastery".

Scarlett Johansson was paid $4,131 a week for her two months of work.

=== Post-production ===
The film's title was revealed by Bill Murray to be Asteroid City at the BFI London Film Festival in October 2021. Alexandre Desplat composed the score, his sixth collaboration with Anderson. Costume design was by multiple Academy Award winner Milena Canonero. In July 2022, it was announced that Focus Features would distribute the film, reuniting them with Anderson after Moonrise Kingdom (2012). It was also revealed that Murray would not be in the film as initially reported, as a result of contracting COVID-19 before he could shoot his scenes, leading to him being replaced by Steve Carell for the role of the motel manager.

== Marketing ==
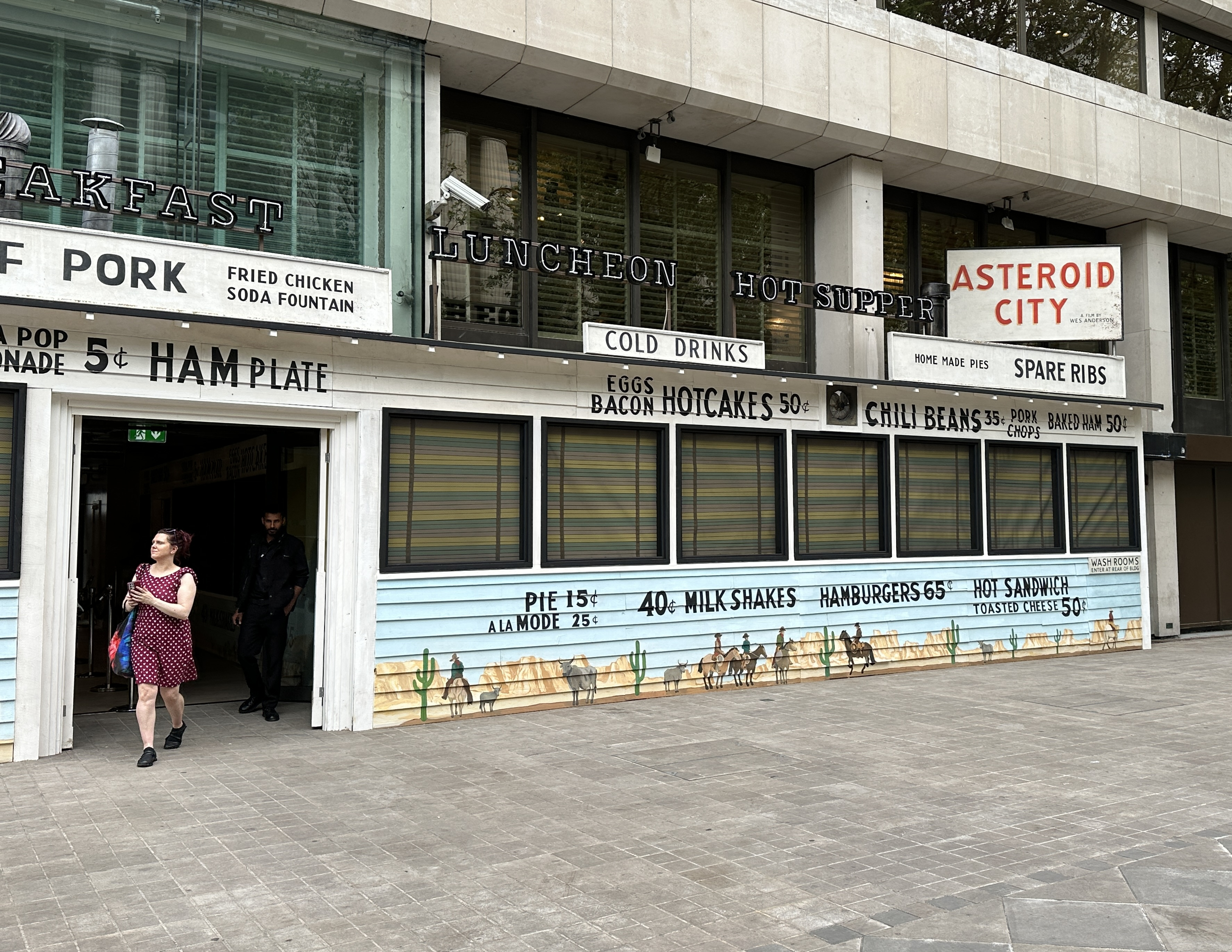
The Asteroid City immersive exhibition in London

A teaser poster for Asteroid City was released on March 28, 2023. The first trailer was released the following day, which featured a rendition of Johnny Duncan's 1957 song "Last Train to San Fernando". Jazz Monroe of Pitchfork called the trailer "extremely Andersonian", while Charles Pulliam-Moore of The Verge wrote that the film "looks and feels exactly how you'd think a Wes Anderson coming-of-age movie about stargazing in the desert would".

== Release ==
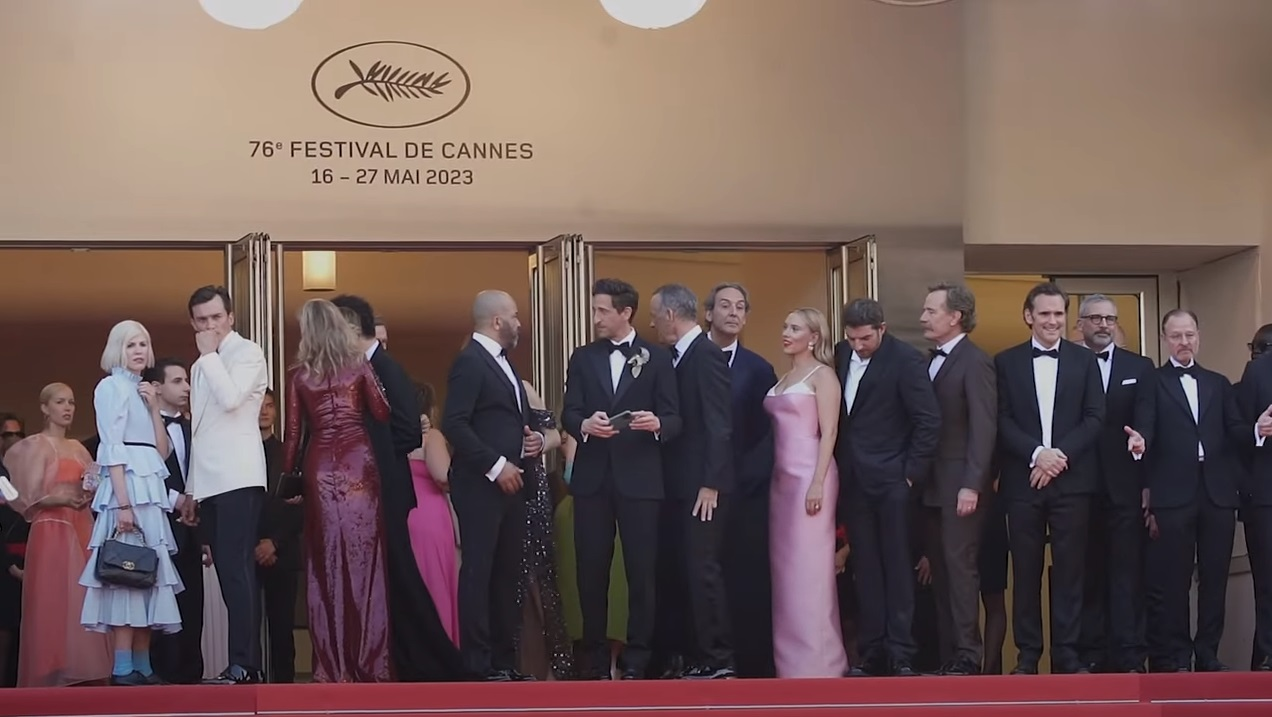
The cast of Asteroid City at the 2023 Cannes Film Festival

Asteroid City premiered at the 76th Cannes Film Festival on May 23, 2023. It was given a limited theatrical release in New York City and Los Angeles in the United States on June 16, 2023, expanding to a wide release on June 23, 2023. It had an earlier premiere in Sweden and a limited number of other countries on June 9, 2023.

=== Home media ===
Asteroid City was released digitally on July 11, 2023, two and a half weeks after its theatrical premiere. A DVD and Blu-ray were released on August 15, 2023. It began streaming on Peacock on August 11, 2023.

=== MPA rating ===
Due to a "blink-and-you-could-miss-it" scene when Scarlett Johansson appears naked, the Motion Picture Association (MPA) initially gave the film an R-rating "for brief graphic nudity" in the United States. Focus Features successfully appealed the decision, and the film was re-rated PG-13 "for brief graphic nudity, smoking, and some suggestive material", which was the first time the MPA accepted an appeal to lower a rating due to "graphic content". The MPA did not give an official reason for the change, but Ann Lee of The Guardian reported that there had been "speculation that it was down to the nudity being non-sexual".

== Reception ==
=== Box office ===
Asteroid City grossed $28.2 million in the United States and Canada, and $25.8 million in other territories, for a worldwide gross of $54 million.

In its limited opening weekend, it made $853,382 from six theaters, finishing in tenth. Its per-venue average of $142,230 was the best total since the start of the COVID-19 pandemic, and the largest since La La Land in 2016. Expanding to 1,675 theaters in its second weekend, it was projected to gross $7–8 million. It made $3.8 million on its first day of wide release, including $1.1 million from Thursday night previews. It went on to make $9 million, finishing sixth. It also had the highest opening for a Wes Anderson film in wide release. Asteroid City completed its theatrical run in the United States and Canada on September 7, 2023.

=== Critical response ===
On the review aggregator website Rotten Tomatoes, 76% of 362 critics' reviews are positive, with an average rating of 7.0/10. The website's consensus reads: "Asteroid City is unlikely to win Wes Anderson many new converts, but those who respond to his signature style will find this a return to immaculately arranged form." Metacritic, which uses a weighted average, assigned the film a score of 76 out of 100, based on 60 critics, indicating "generally favorable" reviews. Audiences polled by CinemaScore gave the film an average grade of "B" on an A+ to F scale, while PostTrak reported 78% of filmgoers gave it a positive score, with 51% saying they would definitely recommend it.

In The Guardian, Peter Bradshaw called Asteroid City "terrifically entertaining and lightly sophisticated", and wrote: "The movie rattles cleverly and exhilaratingly along, adroitly absorbing the implications of pathos and loneliness without allowing itself to slow down. It is tempting to consider this savant blankness as some kind of symptom, but I really don't think so: it is the expression of style. And what style it is". John Nugent of Empire commended the film's unique visual and narrative style, writing: "[Anderson] remains cinema's most astonishing stylist, the rigour and detail in every frame never better", but warned: "It is occasionally a bit unfocused, and always a bit indulgent. If you don't like The Wes Anderson Film, you won't like this. But we others must hope he keeps making it".

In his review for Vulture, Bilge Ebiri wrote: "To the casual observer, Wes Anderson might seem like someone who either refuses to read his own press or has bought into his press to an absurd degree", alluding to criticism of Anderson's filmmaking style, but later argued: "There's a point to all this indulgence. Anderson's obsessively constructed dioramas explore the very human need to organize, quantify, and control our lives in the face of the unexpected and the uncertain [...] Asteroid City might be the purest expression of this dynamic because it's about the unknown in all its forms".

In his review for The New Yorker, Anthony Lane highlighted Johansson's performance as what "cracks the movie's ordered surface", and wrote: "Even if you regard the latest movie as a box of tricks, you have to admire the nerve with which Johansson, as Midge, delves into that box and plucks out scraps of coolly agonized wit. More deftly than anyone else, she traffics in the to-and-fro between the real and the imagined". Adam Mullins-Khatib of the Chicago Reader hailed the film as "a true achievement from one of America's most unique cinematic voices", complimenting Anderson's direction and screenplay, as well as the cast's performances.

Filmmakers Robert Eggers, Carlos López Estrada, Chad Hartigan and James Ponsoldt all named Asteroid City among their favorite films of 2023.

In June 2025, IndieWire ranked the film at number 16 on its list of "The 100 Best Movies of the 2020s (So Far)".

In July 2025, it was one of the films voted for the "Readers' Choice" edition of The New York Times' list of "The 100 Best Movies of the 21st Century", finishing at number 292.

More critical reviews of Asteroid City focused on its pace and story. Writing for the BBC, Nicholas Barber said that "at no point does [Anderson] allow us to settle into any narrative in particular". Owen Gleiberman of Variety found the film similar to the "fussy, top-heavy, narratively batty yet stretched-thin concoctions" he saw in The Darjeeling Limited and The Life Aquatic with Steve Zissou, and concluded: "...[the] extraterrestrial visit results in Asteroid City being placed under quarantine, which means that everyone who has come to town is trapped there. The audience will know just how that feels. Asteroid City looks smashing, but as a movie it's for Anderson die-hards only, and maybe not even too many of them". Gleiberman called Asteroid City one of the worst movies of 2023. Time's Stephanie Zacharek said: "Wes Anderson's Asteroid City is what happens when a filmmaker's world of wonder and whimsy becomes a prison".

=== Accolades ===
The film appeared on multiple critics' lists of the best films of 2023, including:

- 2nd – The New Yorker
- 2nd – Esquire
- 3rd – IndieWire
- 3rd – IGN
- 4th – The Atlantic
- 5th – RogerEbert.com
- 6th – The New York Times
- 7th – The Independent
- 8th - The Film Stage
- 9th – Vulture
- 10th – Vanity Fair
- 10th – IndieWire
- 11th – Slant Magazine
- 13th – Sight and Sound
- 15th – Mashable

=== Awards and nominations ===
Awards and nominations for Showing Up
Award	Date of ceremony	Category	Recipient(s)	Result	Ref.
ADG Excellence in Production Design Awards	February 10, 2024	Excellence in Production Design for a Period Film	Adam Stockhausen	Nominated	
Artios Awards	March 7, 2024	Outstanding Achievement in Casting – Big Budget Feature (Comedy)	Douglas Aibel, Jina Jay, Matthew Glasner	Nominated	
Astra Film Awards	February 26, 2023	Best Production Design	Adam Stockhausen	Nominated	
Boston Society of Film Critics Awards	December 10, 2023	Best Ensemble Cast	Asteroid City	Runner-up	
Boston Society of Film Critics Awards	December 10, 2023	Best Cinematography	Robert D. Yeoman	Runner-up	
Cannes Film Festival	May 27, 2023	Palme d'Or	Wes Anderson	Nominated	
Chicago Film Critics Association Awards	December 12, 2023	Best Art Direction/Production Design	Adam Stockhausen	Nominated	
Chicago Film Critics Association Awards	December 12, 2023	Best Cinematography	Robert D. Yeoman	Nominated	
Chicago Film Critics Association Awards	December 12, 2023	Best Costume Design	Milena Canonero	Nominated	
Critics' Choice Awards	January 14, 2024	Best Production Design	Adam Stockhausen	Nominated	
Critics' Choice Super Awards	April 4, 2024	Best Science Fiction/Fantasy Movie	Asteroid City	Nominated	
Columbus Film Critics Association	January 4, 2024	Best Ensemble	Asteroid City	Nominated	
Columbus Film Critics Association	January 4, 2024	Best Original Screenplay	Wes Anderson & Roman Coppola	Nominated	
Columbus Film Critics Association	January 4, 2024	Frank Gabrenya Award for Best Comedy	Asteroid City	Nominated	
Columbus Film Critics Association	January 4, 2024	Actor of the Year (for an exemplary body of work)	Willem Dafoe, also for Poor Things, Inside and The Boy and the Heron	Nominated	
Columbus Film Critics Association	January 4, 2024	Actor of the Year (for an exemplary body of work)	Jeffrey Wright, also for American Fiction and Rustin	Runner-up	
Florida Film Critics Circle	December 21, 2023	Best Ensemble	Asteroid City	Runner-up	
Florida Film Critics Circle	December 21, 2023	Best Director	Wes Anderson	Nominated	
Florida Film Critics Circle	December 21, 2023	Best Original Screenplay	Wes Anderson	Runner-up	
Florida Film Critics Circle	December 21, 2023	Best Art Direction/Production Design	Adam Stockhausen	Won	
Greater Western New York Film Critics Association Awards	January 6, 2024	Best Picture	Asteroid City	Nominated	
Hollywood Critics Association Midseason Film Awards	June 30, 2023	Best Picture	Asteroid City	Nominated	
Hollywood Critics Association Midseason Film Awards	June 30, 2023	Best Supporting Actress	Scarlett Johansson	Nominated	
Hollywood Critics Association Midseason Film Awards	June 30, 2023	Best Screenplay	Wes Anderson	Nominated	
Hollywood Music in Media Awards	November 15, 2023	Best Original Score – Sci-Fi/Fantasy Film	Alexandre Desplat	Nominated	
Indiana Film Journalists Association	December 18, 2023	Best Picture	Asteroid City	Nominated	
Indiana Film Journalists Association	December 18, 2023	Best Original Screenplay	Wes Anderson & Roman Coppola	Nominated	
Indiana Film Journalists Association	December 18, 2023	Best Ensemble Acting	Asteroid City	Nominated	
Indiana Film Journalists Association	December 18, 2023	Best Cinematography	Robert D. Yeoman	Nominated	
Indiana Film Journalists Association	December 18, 2023	Best Musical Score	Alexandre Desplat	Nominated	
IndieWire Critics Poll	December 11, 2023	Best Film	Asteroid City	10th Place	
IndieWire Critics Poll	December 11, 2023	Best Director	Wes Anderson	8th Place	
IndieWire Critics Poll	December 11, 2023	Best Screenplay	Wes Anderson and Roman Coppola	10th Place	
Las Vegas Film Critics Society Awards	December 13, 2023	Best Art Direction	Adam Stockhausen	Nominated	
Las Vegas Film Critics Society Awards	December 13, 2023	Youth in Film - Male	Jake Ryan	Nominated	
London Critics Circle Film Awards	February 24, 2023	Best British/Irish Performer of the Year	Tilda Swinton	Nominated (Note: Also for The Eternal Daughter and The Killer)	
Manaki Brothers Film Festival	September 29, 2023	Golden Camera 300	Robert D. Yeoman	Nominated	
Minnesota Film Critics Alliance	February 4, 2024	Best Ensemble	Asteroid City	Nominated	
North Texas Film Critics Association	December 18, 2023	Gary Murray Award for Best Ensemble	Asteroid City	Nominated	
North Texas Film Critics Association	December 18, 2023	Best Cinematography	Robert D. Yeoman	Nominated	
Online Association of Female Film Critics	December 21, 2023	Best Costume Design	Milena Canonero	Nominated	
People's Choice Awards	February 18, 2024	The Comedy Movie of the Year	Asteroid City	Nominated	
People's Choice Awards	February 18, 2024	The Comedy Movie Star of the Year	Scarlett Johansson	Nominated	
Phoenix Critics Circle	December 15, 2023	Best Comedy Film	Asteroid City	Nominated	
Phoenix Critics Circle	December 15, 2023	Best Science Fiction Film	Asteroid City	Nominated	
San Francisco Bay Area Film Critics Circle Awards	January 9, 2024	Best Production Design	Adam Stockhausen	Nominated	
Seattle Film Critics Society	January 8, 2024	Best Ensemble Cast	Asteroid City	Nominated	
Seattle Film Critics Society	January 8, 2024	Best Cinematography	Robert D. Yeoman	Runner-up	
Seattle Film Critics Society	January 8, 2024	Best Art Direction/Production Design	Adam Stockhausen	Nominated	
Washington DC Area Film Critics Association Awards	December 10, 2023	Best Production Design	Adam Stockhausen & Kris Moran	Nominated	
