= Indian Paintbrush (company) =

American film production company

- Industry: Film
- Founded: 2006; 20 years ago
- Founder: Steven Rales
- Headquarters: Santa Monica, California, U.S.

Indian Paintbrush Productions LLC is an American film production company founded by businessman Steven Rales in 2006. It is based in Santa Monica, California, and specializes in the production and distribution of comedy-drama and romantic films. Rales and Indian Paintbrush have financed and produced several releases by filmmaker Wes Anderson, such as The Grand Budapest Hotel (2014), Isle of Dogs (2018), and The Wonderful Story of Henry Sugar (2023). Other notable productions include Like Crazy (2011), Me and Earl and the Dying Girl (2015), and Conclave (2024).

== Films ==
List of films produced by Indian Paintbrush
| Year | Title | Ref. |
|---|---|---|
| 2007 | Towelhead | |
| 2007 | The Darjeeling Limited | |
| 2009 | Fantastic Mr. Fox | |
| 2011 | Like Crazy | |
| 2011 | Jeff, Who Lives at Home | |
| 2012 | Moonrise Kingdom | |
| 2012 | Seeking a Friend for the End of the World | |
| 2012 | Not Fade Away | |
| 2013 | Breathe In | |
| 2013 | Stoker | |
| 2013 | Trance | |
| 2013 | Labor Day | |
| 2014 | The Grand Budapest Hotel | |
| 2015 | Me and Earl and the Dying Girl | |
| 2018 | Isle of Dogs | |
| 2021 | The French Dispatch | |
| 2023 | Asteroid City | |
| 2023 | The Wonderful Story of Henry Sugar | |
| 2023 | My Mother's Wedding | |
| 2024 | My Old Ass | |
| 2024 | The Wonderful Story of Henry Sugar and Three More | |
| 2024 | Conclave | |
| 2025 | The Phoenician Scheme | |
| 2027 | Jack of Spades | |
