= Robert Yeoman =

American cinematographer

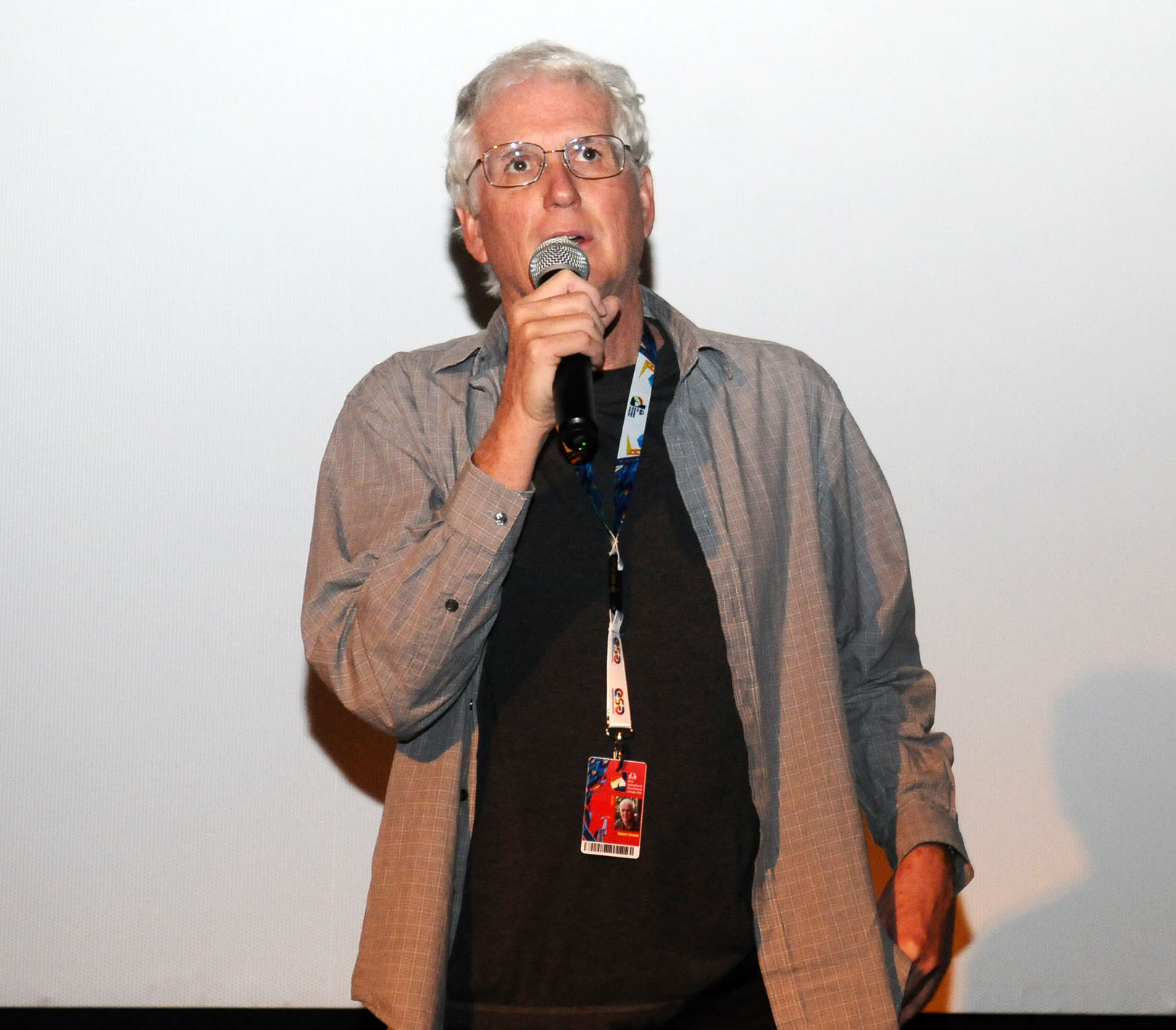
- Yeoman in 2016
- Born: Robert David Yeoman; March 10, 1951 (age 75); Erie, Pennsylvania, U.S.
- Education: Duke University
- Years active: 1982–2026
- Organization: American Society of Cinematographers

Robert David Yeoman, ASC (born March 10, 1951) is an American cinematographer.

He is best known for his collaboration with director Wes Anderson, working on all of his live-action films from 1996 to 2024, with his work on The Grand Budapest Hotel (2014) earning him an Academy Award and a BAFTA Award nomination for Best Cinematography.

== Life and career ==
Born in Erie, Pennsylvania, Yeoman spent his childhood in the northern suburbs of Chicago. He received a Bachelor of Arts from Duke University in 1973 and a Master of Fine Arts from the University of Southern California School of Cinematic Arts in 1979.

Yeoman's first filmwork was done as a second unit director of photography on To Live and Die in LA, directed by William Friedkin in 1986. He went on to shoot many independent films including Gus Van Sant's Drugstore Cowboy — for which he won the Independent Spirit Award for Best Cinematography — Noah Baumbach's The Squid and the Whale, Roman Coppola's CQ and Kevin Smith's Dogma. He has worked on almost every live-action feature film by Wes Anderson (except The Phoenician Scheme), including Bottle Rocket (1996), Rushmore (1998), and The Royal Tenenbaums (2001) as cinematographer, as well as The Life Aquatic with Steve Zissou (2004), The Darjeeling Limited (2007), Moonrise Kingdom (2012) and The Grand Budapest Hotel (2014), credited as director of photography. He was nominated for an Academy Award for Best Cinematography for his work on The Grand Budapest Hotel.

Yeoman is a member of the American Society of Cinematographers.

== Style ==
Yeoman frequently collaborates with director Wes Anderson. His style in Anderson's films consists of using color palettes to highlight the colors of the set and costumes. Anderson and Yeoman shoot the movies with film stock, anamorphic lenses, soft lighting, and theater-like composition, giving them the distinctive visuals for which Anderson's films are known.

== Filmography ==
=== Film ===
Year	Title	Director
1983	Hero (Note: Shared credit with Alexandre Rockwell)	Alexandre Rockwell
1987	Rampage	William Friedkin
1988	Rented Lips	Robert Downey Sr.
1988	Johnny Be Good	Bud S. Smith
1988	Dead Heat	Mark Goldblatt
1989	Drugstore Cowboy	Gus Van Sant
1989	The Wizard	Todd Holland
1990	Too Much Sun	Robert Downey Sr.
1990	Kid	John Mark Robinson
1991	The Linguini Incident	Richard Shepard
1991	Past Midnight	Jan Eliasberg
1993	The Paint Job	Michael Taav
1994	Somebody to Love	Alexandre Rockwell
1995	Coldblooded	Wallace Wolodarsky
1996	Bottle Rocket	Wes Anderson
1996	The Substance of Fire	Daniel J. Sullivan
1997	White Lies	Ken Selden
1998	Permanent Midnight	David Veloz
1998	Rushmore	Wes Anderson
1999	Dogma	Kevin Smith
2000	Down to You	Kris Isacsson
2000	Beautiful	Sally Field
2001	Double Whammy	Tom DiCillo
2001	CQ	Roman Coppola
2001	The Royal Tenenbaums	Wes Anderson
2004	The Life Aquatic with Steve Zissou	Wes Anderson
2005	The Squid and the Whale	Noah Baumbach
2005	Red Eye	Wes Craven
2007	The Darjeeling Limited	Wes Anderson
2007	Martian Child	Menno Meyjes
2008	Manolete	Menno Meyjes
2008	Yes Man	Peyton Reed
2009	Whip It	Drew Barrymore
2010	Get Him to the Greek	Nicholas Stoller
2011	Bridesmaids	Paul Feig
2012	Moonrise Kingdom	Wes Anderson
2013	The Heat	Paul Feig
2014	The Grand Budapest Hotel	Wes Anderson
2014	Love & Mercy	Bill Pohlad
2015	Spy	Paul Feig
2016	Ghostbusters	Paul Feig
2018	Mamma Mia! Here We Go Again	Ol Parker
2021	The French Dispatch	Wes Anderson
2023	Asteroid City	Wes Anderson
2026	Office Romance	Ol Parker
TBA	The Collaboration	Kwame Kwei-Armah

Short film

Year	Title	Director
2007	Hotel Chevalier	Wes Anderson
2023	The Wonderful Story of Henry Sugar	Wes Anderson
2023	The Rat Catcher	Wes Anderson
2023	Poison	Wes Anderson

=== Television ===
TV movies

Year	Title	Director
1986	C.A.T. Squad	William Friedkin
1991	Perfect Harmony	Will Mackenzie
1993	Double Deception	Jan Egleson
1998	The Pentagon Wars	Richard Benjamin

== Awards and nominations ==
Year	Title	Award/Nomination
1989	Drugstore Cowboy	Independent Spirit Award for Best Cinematography
2012	Moonrise Kingdom	Nominated- Boston Society of Film Critics Award for Best Cinematography; Nominated- Chlotrudis Award for Best Cinematography in a Feature Film; Nominated- Independent Spirit Award for Best Cinematography; Nominated- Online Film Critics Society Award for Best Cinematography
2014	The Grand Budapest Hotel	Chicago Film Critics Association Award for Best Cinematography (Note: Tied with Emmanuel Lubezki); IndieWire Critics Poll Award for Best Cinematography (3rd place); Online Film Critics Society Award for Best Cinematography; Nominated- Academy Award for Best Cinematography; Nominated- BAFTA Award for Best Cinematography; Nominated- Critics' Choice Movie Award for Best Cinematography; Nominated- ASC Award for Outstanding Achievement in Cinematography; Nominated- BSC Best Cinematography Award; Nominated- Chlotrudis Award for Best Cinematography in a Feature Film; Nominated- Florida Film Critics Circle Award for Best Cinematography; Nominated- Georgia Film Critics Association Award for Best Cinematography; Nominated- Houston Film Critics Society Award for Best Cinematography; Nominated- San Francisco Film Critics Circle Award for Best Cinematography; Nominated- St. Louis Gateway Film Critics Award for Best Cinematography; Nominated- Washington D.C. Area Film Critics Award for Best Cinematography
