= Fantastic Mr. Fox (film) =

2009 film by Wes Anderson

- Theatrical release poster
- Directed by: Wes Anderson
- Screenplay by: Wes Anderson; Noah Baumbach
- Based on: Fantastic Mr Fox by Roald Dahl
- Produced by: Allison Abbate; Scott Rudin; Wes Anderson; Jeremy Dawson
- Starring: George Clooney; Meryl Streep; Jason Schwartzman; Bill Murray; Willem Dafoe; Owen Wilson
- Cinematography: Tristan Oliver
- Edited by: Andrew Weisblum
- Music by: Alexandre Desplat
- Production companies: 20th Century Fox; American Empirical Pictures
- Distributed by: 20th Century Fox
- Release dates: October 14, 2009 (BFI); October 23, 2009 (United Kingdom); November 13, 2009 (United States)
- Running time: 87 minutes
- Countries: United Kingdom; United States
- Language: English
- Budget: $40 million
- Box office: $47.1 million

Fantastic Mr. Fox is a 2009 stop motion animated adventure comedy film directed by Wes Anderson, who co-wrote it with Noah Baumbach, based on the 1970 novel by Roald Dahl. It stars George Clooney, Meryl Streep, Jason Schwartzman, Bill Murray, Willem Dafoe, and Owen Wilson. In the stop-motion animated film, a spree of thefts led by Mr. Fox (Clooney) results in his family, and later his community, being hunted down by three farmers.

Development on the project began in 2004 as a collaboration between Anderson and Henry Selick under Revolution Studios; by 2007, Revolution and Selick left for other projects. Work on Fantastic Mr. Fox was moved to 20th Century Fox, where production began in 2007 on Stage C of 3 Mills Studios in London. In addition to an original score by Alexandre Desplat, the soundtrack includes several songs from other artists.

Fantastic Mr. Fox premiered as the opening film of the 53rd BFI London Film Festival on October 14, 2009, and was released in the United Kingdom on October 23 and United States on November 13. The film received critical acclaim, with praise for its humor, stop-motion animation and Anderson's direction. However, it underperformed at the box-office, grossing $47.1 million against a $40 million budget. The film received Academy Award nominations for Best Animated Feature and Best Original Score but lost both to Up. It is now considered to be among the best animated films of the 21st century.

== Plot ==
While raiding Berk's Squab Farm, Mr. Fox and his wife, Felicity, are caught in a trap. Felicity reveals her pregnancy to her husband and makes him promise to find a safer job. Twelve fox-years later, the Foxes and their son, Ash, are living in a hole. Ignoring his lawyer Clive Badger's warnings, Mr. Fox moves them into a better home inside a tree, perilously close to the operations of three notorious farmers: Walt Boggis, Nate Bunce, and Frank Bean.

Soon after the Foxes move in, Felicity's nephew Kristofferson Silverfox comes to live with them due to his father receiving long-term treatment for double pneumonia. Longing for his days as a thief, Mr. Fox and his opossum friend Kylie steal poultry and cider from Boggis, Bunce, and Bean's farms. Angered by the raids, the farmers shoot off Mr. Fox's tail and demolish his home, forcing the Foxes underground. The group encounters Badger and many other animals whose homes the three farmers have destroyed. As the homeless animals begin fearing starvation and blaming the Foxes, Mr. Fox leads them on a digging expedition to tunnel to the three farms, stealing their prized goods.

Discovering that Mr. Fox has stolen all their goods, the farmers and the fire chief flood the animals' tunnel network with Bean's cider, washing them out into the sewers. Ash and Kristofferson slip away from the celebration and return to Bean's farm, intending to reclaim the missing tail, but Bean's wife discovers their presence and captures Kristofferson. Realizing that the farmers plan to use Kristofferson to lure him into an ambush, Mr. Fox heads to the surface to surrender but returns when Rat, Bean's violent security guard, confronts the animals and attacks Ash and Felicity. A fight between Mr. Fox and Rat results in the latter being pushed into a generator, electrocuting him. Before dying, Rat reveals that Kristofferson is being held in an attic in Bean Annex, prompting Mr. Fox to organize a rescue mission.

He asks the farmers for a meeting in Paddington near the sewer hub, offering to surrender himself on the condition that the farmers free Kristofferson and spare the other animals. The farmers prepare an ambush, but the animals, anticipating it, launch a counterattack that allows Mr. Fox, Ash, and Kylie to enter Bean Annex undetected. Ash frees Kristofferson and impresses his father and the group by braving enemy fire to release a rabid beagle to keep the farmers at bay.

As the farmers wait for the animals to come out of the manhole, the animals settle into their new homes in the sewers. Soon afterward, Fox raids a supermarket owned by the farmers, where Felicity reveals her new pregnancy. The animals dance in the aisles, celebrating their abundant new food source.

== Voice cast ==
- George Clooney as Mr. Fox
- Meryl Streep as Mrs. Felicity Fox
- Jason Schwartzman as Ash Fox, their son
- Eric Anderson as Kristofferson Silverfox, Felicity's nephew and Ash's younger cousin
- Bill Murray as lawyer Clive Badger
- Wally Wolodarsky as Kylie the opossum
- Michael Gambon as farmer Franklin Bean
- Helen McCrory as Mrs. Bean
- Garth Jennings as Bean's son
- Robin Hurlstone as farmer Walter Boggis
- Hugo Guinness as farmer Nathan Bunce
- Willem Dafoe as Rat
- Owen Wilson as Coach Skip
- Jarvis Cocker as Petey
- Wes Anderson as Stan Weasel
- Karen Duffy as Linda Otter
- Roman Coppola as Squirrel Contractor
- Juman Malouf as Agnes, Mr. Fox and Felicity's adopted daughter
- Brian Cox as Daniel Peabody
- James Hamilton as Phil Mole
- Steven Rales as Beaver
- Jeremy Dawson as Beaver's son
- Jennifer Furches as Dr. Badger
- Adrien Brody as Rickity the Field Mouse
- Mario Batali as Rabbit
- Allison Abbate as Rabbit's ex-girlfriend

== Production ==
=== Development ===
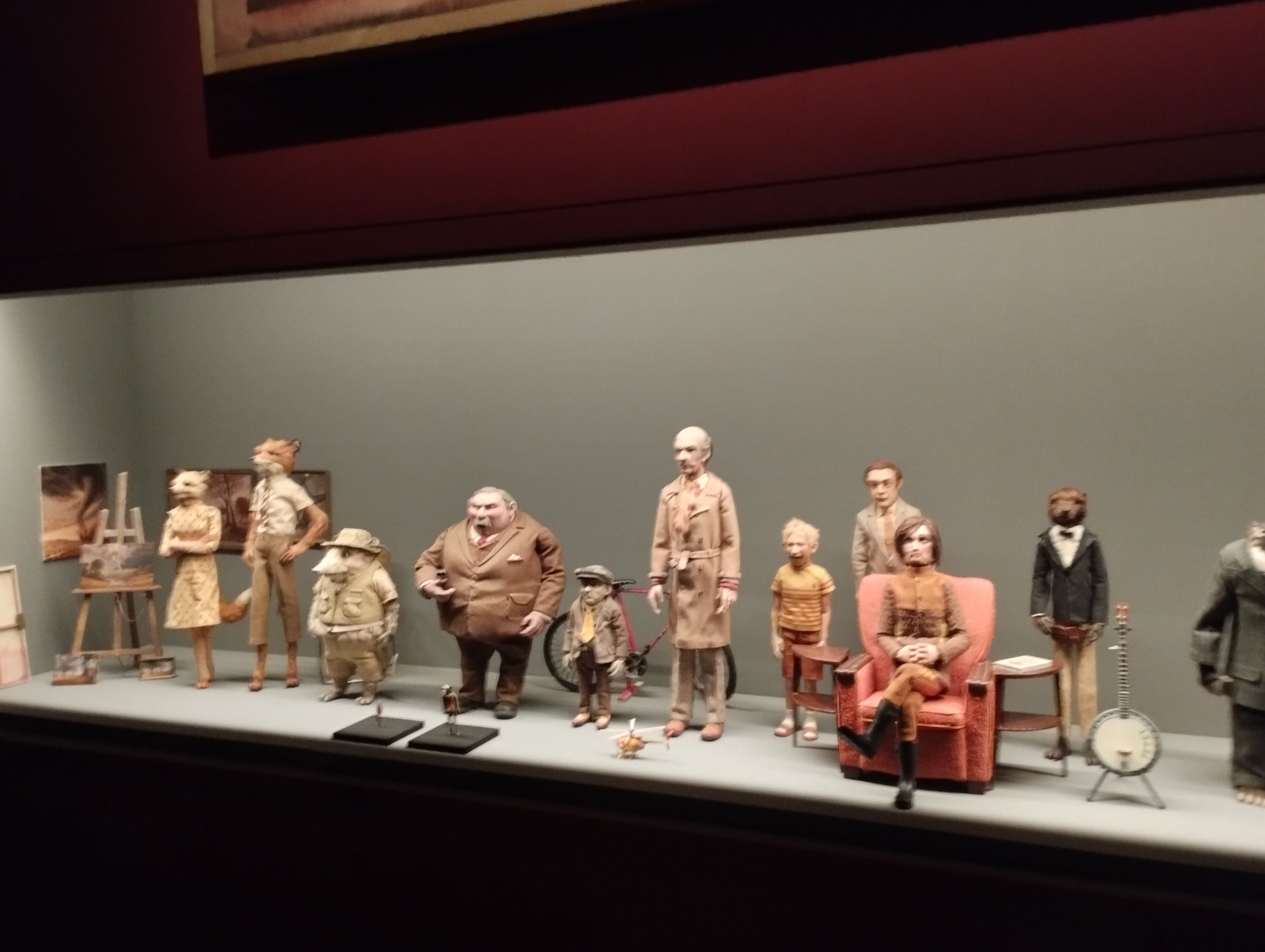
Marionettes at Cinémathèque française

Joe Roth and Revolution Studios bought the film rights to Fantastic Mr Fox in 2004. In 2006, Mark Mothersbaugh said that he was working on the soundtrack. Wes Anderson signed on as director with Henry Selick, who worked with Anderson on The Life Aquatic with Steve Zissou, as animation director. Anderson revealed that he signed on because Roald Dahl was one of his heroes. Originally, Cate Blanchett was to voice Mrs. Fox, but she left the role for undisclosed reasons.

The story the novel covers would amount to the second act of the film. Anderson added new scenes to serve for the film's beginning and end. The new scenes precede Mr. Fox's plan to steal from the three farmers and follow the farmers bulldozing of the hill, beginning with the flooding of the tunnel. Selick left the project, to work on the Neil Gaiman story Coraline in February 2006. He was replaced by Mark Gustafson. 20th Century Fox Animation became the project's home in October 2006 after Revolution left for other projects.

By September 2007, voice work on the film began. Anderson chose to record the voices outside rather than in a studio: "We went out in a forest, went in an attic, and went in a stable. We went underground for some things. There was a great spontaneity in the recordings because of that". The voices were recorded before any animation was done.

=== Animation ===
Anderson, regarding the production design, said his intention was to use real trees and sand for the sets, "but it's all miniature". Great Missenden, where Roald Dahl lived, has a major influence on the film's look. The film mixes several forms of animation but consists primarily of stop motion. Animation took place in London, on Stage C at 3 Mills Studios, and the puppets were created by Mackinnon & Saunders, with Anderson directing the crew, many of whom animated Tim Burton's Corpse Bride. Selick, who kept in contact with Anderson, said the director would act out scenes while in Paris and send them to Gustafson and the animators via iPhone. To capture an autumnal aesthetic, there is no frame in the film that lacks the color orange.

== Music ==
The film's soundtrack featured a selection of songs from The Beach Boys, The Bobby Fuller Four, Burl Ives, Art Tatum, Georges Delerue, The Rolling Stones, and other artists. An original score composed by Alexandre Desplat accompanied the remainder of the album. ABKCO Records released the soundtrack on November 10, 2009, three days ahead of the film. Desplat was nominated for the Academy Award for Best Original Score and BAFTA Award for Best Original Music for his work in the film.

== Themes ==
Themes in the film include gluttony and greed, which are manifested by both the protagonists and antagonists, in addition to hardship, economic determinism, justice and freedom, individuality, classism, insecurity and conformity (such as the case with Mr. Fox's son Ash), self-acceptance, personal struggle and accepting social change.

=== Characters symbolization and traits ===
The three farmers, Boggis, Bunce, and Bean, represent the wealthy in society. Mr. Fox has a desperate desire for validation from others, as he battles his own internal insecurities. Mr. Fox exhibits narcissism and a fear of accepting defeat, although the film demonstrates that failure is not a bad thing, despite the destruction of his home. The farmers' attacks on the animals is due to Mr. Fox's narcissism and his reliance on burglary.

Unlike in the book, Mr. Fox possesses self-consciousness and has an existential crisis in the film. Mr. Fox's existential crisis is what drives him to purchase a newer house and regress to his criminal habits in order to obtain better food for his family. However, only by the end of the film he realizes that his pride had gotten in the way, where he put his loved ones in danger, and this therefore becomes the moral of the story; to prohibit self-pride getting in the way of loved ones.

=== Class struggle ===
The film depict issues of class struggle, as Mr. Fox feels poor and is then determined to take on the affluent, avaricious farmers. In retaliation to Mr. Fox's thievery of produce, the farmers destroy nearly everything, killing almost every animal in town (as a means of collective punishment), with others being displaced. In the end, however, it is the lower class (or the unfortunate and feeble) animals who are the champions and are able to outwit the rich, vindictive farmers.

=== Gender roles ===
The film focuses on what it means to be a father and husband; Mr. Fox breaks his promise made to his wife by continuing to steal, and therefore turns everyone's lives upside down: the situation compels him to look at himself and to acknowledge who he is.

Many of the qualities that Mr. Fox feels makes him great are linked with his masculinity. Although it is actually set in the mid-to-late 2000s, the film's style and aesthetic is anachronistically 1970s, a period when men were taught that they should be strong and confident earners for the family. Mr. Fox's failure halfway through the film is due to him not achieving sufficiently as a man, even though his wife says that they were "poor but happy". As a housewife, Mrs. Fox's main contribution to the film's plot is pressing Mr. Fox to evaluate the impact of his recklessness; she is stereotyped as a "proper woman", a notion commonly held in the 1970s.

Fox's misfit son Ash is considered "different", despite his efforts to be athletic like his father. He walks in an effeminate way and has markings that resemble eyeliner, unlike other male characters in the film – a contrast in style that could imply that he is gay.

=== Denialism and acceptance ===
Throughout the film, the animal protagonists are in denial about being "wild animals", even though the way they interact and fight showcase that they are wild. Mr. Fox and Kylie discuss how they are afraid of wolves, an example of a wild animal; however, after coming into contact with a wolf in the film's ending, they appreciate the wolf's beauty and their similarities with them. Mr. Fox then acknowledges the idea of living underground since he accepts himself to be a wild animal with a simple life.

== Release ==
The film had its world premiere as the opening film of the 53rd BFI London Film Festival on October 14, 2009. 20th Century Fox released it theatrically in the United Kingdom on October 23 and the United States on November 13.

=== Home media ===
20th Century Fox Home Entertainment released the DVD and Blu-ray in the United States on March 23, 2010. The Criterion Collection released the film on Blu-ray and DVD on February 18, 2014. It was released on Ultra HD Blu-ray by Criterion (who became Indian Paintbrush's sister company in May 2024) on September 30, 2025, as part of the ten film collection The Wes Anderson Archive: Ten Films, Twenty-Five Years.

On May 22, 2020, Fantastic Mr. Fox was made available to stream on Disney+ in North America.

=== Box office ===
Fantastic Mr. Fox grossed $21,002,919 in the U.S., and $25,468,104 outside the U.S., making a total of $46,187,511 worldwide.

=== Critical reception ===
On the review aggregator website Rotten Tomatoes, 93% of 245 critics' reviews are positive, with an average rating of 8.1/10. The website's consensus reads: "Fantastic Mr. Fox is a delightfully funny feast for the eyes with multi-generational appeal – and it shows Wes Anderson has a knack for animation." The film also became the second highest-rated animated film in 2009 on the site, behind Up. On Metacritic, it has a weighted average score of 83 out of 100 based on 34 reviews, indicating "universal acclaim". Audiences polled by CinemaScore gave the film an average grade of "B+" on an A+ to F scale.

Roger Ebert gave the film three and a half stars out of four, writing that, like Willy Wonka & the Chocolate Factory, children may find some aspects of the film perplexing or scary, which he considered a positive element to a children's film. Devin D. O'Leary of Weekly Alibi called it "a one-of-a-kind family classic."

A. O. Scott called Fantastic Mr. Fox:

In some ways (Wes Anderson's) most fully realized and satisfying film. Once you adjust to its stop-and-start rhythms and its scruffy looks, you can appreciate its wit, its beauty and the sly gravity of its emotional undercurrents. The work done by the animation director, Mark Gustafson, by the director of photography, Tristan Oliver, and by the production designer, Nelson Lowry, shows amazing ingenuity and skill, and the music (by Alexandre Desplat, with the usual shuffle of well-chosen pop tunes, famous and obscure) is both eccentric and just right.

According to Time, the film is "both a delightful amusement and a distillation of the filmmaker's essential playfulness" and was one of the ten best films of the year. Cosmo Landesman of The Sunday Times said "having a quirky auteur like Anderson make a children's film is a bit like David Byrne, of Talking Heads, recording an album of nursery rhymes produced by Brian Eno". According to Landesman:

In style and sensibility, this is really a Wes Anderson film, with little Dahl. It's missing the darker elements that characterize Dahl's books. There you find the whiff of something nasty: child abuse, violence, misogyny. Gone, too, is any sense of danger. Even the farmers, who are made to look a touch evil, don't seem capable of it. We never feel the tension of watching the Fox family facing real peril. The film certainly has Americanized Dahl's story, and I don't mean the fact that the good animals have American accents and the baddies have British ones. It offers yet another celebration of difference and a lesson on the importance of being yourself. But it does leave you thinking: isn't it time that children's films put children first?

Amy Biancolli from the Houston Chronicle wrote:

Anderson injects such charm and wit, such personality and nostalgia—evident in the old-school animation, storybook settings and pitch-perfect use of Burl Ives—that it's easy to forgive his self-conscious touches.

Ann Hornaday from The Washington Post calls it a:

Self-consciously quirky movie that manages to be twee and ultra-hip at the same time, it qualifies as yet another wry, carefully composed bibelot in the cabinet of curios that defines the Anderson oeuvre.

Peter Howell from the Toronto Star stated:

In an age when everything seems digital, computer-driven and as fake as instant coffee, more and more artists (Spike Jonze and John Lasseter among them) are embracing the old ways of vinyl records, hand-drawn cartoons and painstaking stop-motion character movements.

In 2011, Richard Corliss of Time magazine named it one of "The 25 All-Time Best Animated Films".

In 2025, the film ranked number 65 on the "Readers' Choice" edition of The New York Times' list of "The 100 Best Movies of the 21st Century" and number 88 on Rolling Stone's list of "The 100 Best Movies of the 21st Century."

=== Awards ===
The film was nominated for the 2010 Critics Choice Awards for Best Animated Feature, the 2010 Golden Globe Award for Best Animated Feature Film, the 2010 Academy Award for Best Animated Feature, and Academy Award for Best Original Score.

Award	Date of ceremony	Category	Recipients	Result
Academy Awards	March 7, 2010	Best Animated Feature	Wes Anderson	Nominated
Academy Awards	March 7, 2010	Best Original Score	Alexandre Desplat	Nominated
Annie Awards	February 6, 2010	Best Animated Feature	Wes Anderson	Nominated
Annie Awards	February 6, 2010	Directing in a Feature Production	Wes Anderson	Nominated
Annie Awards	February 6, 2010	Writing in a Feature Production	Wes Anderson and Noah Baumbach	Won
British Academy Film Awards	February 15, 2010	Best Original Music	Alexandre Desplat	Nominated
British Academy Film Awards	February 15, 2010	Best Animated Film	Wes Anderson	Nominated
British Academy Children's Awards	November 28, 2010	Feature Film	Wes Anderson, Allison Abbate, Scott Rudin, Jeremy Dawson	Nominated
Critics Choice Movie Awards	January 15, 2010	Best Adapted Screenplay	Wes Anderson and Noah Baumbach	Nominated
Critics Choice Movie Awards	January 15, 2010	Best Animated Feature	Wes Anderson	Nominated
Golden Globe Awards	January 17, 2010	Best Animated Feature	Wes Anderson	Nominated
Los Angeles Film Critics Association	December 14, 2009	Best Animated Film	Wes Anderson	Won
New York Film Critics Circle	December 14, 2009	Best Picture	Wes Anderson	3rd Place
New York Film Critics Circle	December 14, 2009	Best Animated Film	Wes Anderson	Won
New York Film Critics Circle	December 14, 2009	Best Director	Wes Anderson	2nd Place
New York Film Critics Circle	December 14, 2009	Best Actor	George Clooney (also for Up in the Air)	Won
Online Film Critics Society	January 5, 2010	Best Adapted Screenplay	Wes Anderson and Noah Baumbach	Won
Online Film Critics Society	January 5, 2010	Best Animated Film	Wes Anderson	Nominated
Online Film Critics Society	January 5, 2010	Best Original Score	Alexandre Desplat	Nominated
San Diego Film Critics Society	December 15, 2009	Best Adapted Screenplay	Wes Anderson and Noah Baumbach	Won
San Diego Film Critics Society	December 15, 2009	Best Animated Film	Wes Anderson	Nominated
San Diego Film Critics Society	December 15, 2009	Best Original Score	Alexandre Desplat	Nominated
San Francisco Bay Area Film Critics Circle	December 14, 2009	Best Adapted Screenplay	Wes Anderson and Noah Baumbach	Won

It was also nominated for the Grand Prix of the Belgian Syndicate of Cinema Critics. Alexandre Desplat won Soundtrack Composer of the Year and World Soundtrack of the Year at the 2010 World Soundtrack Awards. On January 14, 2010, the National Board of Review awarded Anderson a Special Filmmaking Achievement award.

After giving his acceptance speech, the audio of the speech was used in a short animation of Anderson's character (Weasel) giving the speech, animated by Payton Curtis, a key stop-motion animator on the film.

== Video game ==
A mobile game based on the movie was released for iPhone. In the game, the player controls Mr. Fox in various topdown accelerometer-controlled levels and avoids obstacles in the path.

== See also ==
- Foxes in popular culture, films and literature
