= Poison (story) =

1950 short story by Roald Dahl

- Short story by Roald Dahl
- Country: United Kingdom
- Language: English

Publication
- Published in: Collier's
- Publication type: Magazine
- Publication date: June 1950

Poison is a short story written by Roald Dahl that was originally published in June 1950 in Collier's.

== Plot summary ==
The story is set in India during the British Raj. The main character is Harry Pope, and the narrator of the story is Timber Woods. Timber goes over to his friend Harry, who is in bed, motionless, sweating, and panicked. He explains that a venomous snake, the krait, has crawled onto his stomach, underneath the covers, and asks Timber to fetch a doctor. Timber calls Dr. Ganderbai, a local Indian doctor who rushes to help. Timber and Ganderbai frantically try to get the snake off Harry through various methods (which include sedating the snake and giving Harry an antivenom). As the story progresses, it is revealed that there is in fact no snake on Harry.

After the initial panic, Ganderbai inquires whether Harry is certain that there actually was a snake. Harry, believing that Ganderbai is calling him a liar, shouts at the doctor and calls him names, including racial slurs. As Ganderbai walks out of the room, Timber thanks him and apologises for Harry's behaviour, telling him not to listen to Harry because of chloroform that has changed the way he acts. When Dr. Ganderbai walks out of the home he tells Timber the only thing Harry needs is a good holiday.

== Adaptations ==
In 1950, Poison was adapted for the radio programme Escape.

In 1958, the story was turned into an episode of Alfred Hitchcock Presents, directed by Alfred Hitchcock himself.

In 1980, it was adapted as the fifth episode of the second series of Tales of the Unexpected. The episode has a few differences from the short story - before he discovers Harry's predicament, Timber has brought home a married local woman, Sandra (played by Judy Geeson) for an illicit rendezvous which slows down the attempts to help Harry as she has to remain hidden from the other characters. Also, at the end of the episode, the krait is discovered by Harry in the drinks cabinet. It bites him, giving him the comeuppance he deserves for his insults toward the doctor (played by Saeed Jaffrey, here named Doctor Kunzru).

In 2023, director Wes Anderson adapted the story as a short film for Netflix, starring Benedict Cumberbatch as Harry, Dev Patel as Timber, and Ben Kingsley as Dr. Ganderbai. That short film is part of Anderson's 2024 anthology film.
