= Jeremy Dawson (producer) =

Canadian-American film producer

- Education: Harvard College, School of Visual Arts: MFA Photography, Video and Related Media
- Occupations: Visual effects artist and film producer
- Years active: 1992–present

Jeremy Dawson is a Canadian-American film producer and visual effects artist. He was nominated for the Academy Award in the category of Best Picture for the 2014 film The Grand Budapest Hotel at the 87th Academy Awards, as well as the Academy Award for Best Animated Feature for the stop-motion film Isle of Dogs (2018). With The Grand Budapest Hotel, he won the Golden Globe Award for Best Motion Picture – Musical or Comedy.

Dawson grew up in Vancouver, British Columbia. He attended the School of Visual Arts (SVA) where he graduated in 1993 in Photography and Related Media. After graduating, he did some freelance work and taught classes at SVA. While pursuing an animation class, he made the title sequence of the film Pi (1998) for Darren Aronofsky, who was a friend of Dawson. He then helped on making visual effects on the movie Requiem for a Dream (2000) and Frida (2002). In 2006, he worked as a second-unit director on the set of the film The Fountain. After helping Wes Anderson with the stop motion segments for the film The Life Aquatic with Steve Zissou, Anderson asked him to produce the films The Darjeeling Limited and Fantastic Mr. Fox (2009). More recently, Dawson has produced The Whale, Asteroid City, and The Wonderful Story of Henry Sugar.
