= Steven Rales =

American businessman and film producer (born 1951)

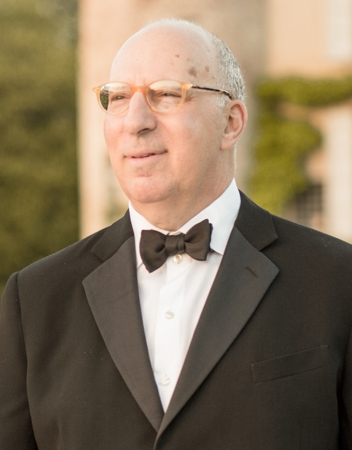
- Rales in 2016
- Born: March 31, 1951 (age 75); Pittsburgh, PA, U.S.
- Education: DePauw University (BA); American University (JD)
- Occupations: Businessman; film producer
- Title: Founder, Danaher and Indian Paintbrush
- Spouses: Christine Plank (m. 1983; div. 2003); Lalage Damerell (m. 2012)
- Children: 3
- Relatives: Amaryllis Fox Kennedy (stepdaughter)
- Family: Mitchell Rales (brother)

Steven M. Rales (born March 31, 1951) is an American businessman and film producer. He founded Danaher Corporation with his brother Mitchell Rales in 1984 and is its chairman. Rales also founded the film production company Indian Paintbrush in 2006, which works closely with filmmaker Wes Anderson. His work with Anderson has resulted in three Academy Award nominations, winning Best Live Action Short Film for The Wonderful Story of Henry Sugar (2023). Rales also owns the media distribution companies Janus Films and The Criterion Collection and holds a 20% stake in the Indiana Pacers of the National Basketball Association (NBA). His net worth was estimated by Forbes in 2024 to be $8.9 billion.

== Early life ==
Raised in a Jewish family, Rales is one of four sons of Ruth (née Abramson) and Norman Rales. His father was raised in the Hebrew Orphan Asylum of New York and later became a businessman and philanthropist in Washington, D.C. credited for enacting the first employee stock ownership plan transaction in U.S. history. In 1969, Rales graduated from Walt Whitman High School in Bethesda, Maryland. In 1973, he graduated from DePauw University, where he was in the Beta Theta Pi fraternity. In 1978, he earned a juris doctor (JD) degree from American University.

== Career ==
In 1979, he left his father's real estate firm to found Equity Group Holdings with his brother Mitchell Rales. Using junk bonds, they bought a diversified line of businesses. They changed the name to Diversified Mortgage Investors in 1978 and to Danaher in 1984, with him serving as its chairman since then. In 1985, they bought Easco Corporation, the then-largest independent aluminum extrusion manufacturer and hand tool manufacturer which produced the Craftsman brand of sockets and wrenches for Sears.

In 1988, they made a hostile takeover bid for Interco, a conglomerate comprising manufacturers as diverse as Converse shoes and Ethan Allen furniture. When the company responded with a poison pill, they sued, and prevailed in court. They later ended the bid after five months with a profit of $60 million.

In 1992, the AM side of WGMS was sold off to the Rales brothers who converted the music station into the first frequency for WTEM, the first full-time sports talk radio station in the Washington metropolitan area. He and his brother founded Colfax Corporation in 1995, an industrial pumps manufacturer based in Richmond, Virginia. In 2008, Rales engineered the initial public offering of the company. Rales also owns a 20% stake in the Indiana Pacers, a National Basketball Association (NBA) team.

=== Indian Paintbrush ===
Rales founded the film production company Indian Paintbrush in 2006. The company works frequently with filmmaker Wes Anderson, producing films such as Moonrise Kingdom, The Grand Budapest Hotel, and Isle of Dogs. Rales has earned three Academy Award nominations for his work with Anderson, winning Best Live Action Short Film for The Wonderful Story of Henry Sugar (2023) at the 96th Academy Awards. In May 2024, he acquired media distribution companies Janus Films and The Criterion Collection.

List of films produced by Rales
Year	Title	Director
2012	Moonrise Kingdom	Wes Anderson
2014	The Grand Budapest Hotel	Wes Anderson
2015	Me and Earl and the Dying Girl	Alfonso Gomez-Rejon
2018	Isle of Dogs	Wes Anderson
2021	The French Dispatch	Wes Anderson
2023	Asteroid City	Wes Anderson
2023	The Wonderful Story of Henry Sugar	Wes Anderson
2023	My Mother's Wedding	Kristin Scott Thomas
2024	My Old Ass	Megan Park
2024	The Wonderful Story of Henry Sugar and Three More	Wes Anderson
2025	The Phoenician Scheme	Wes Anderson
2027	Jack of Spades	Joel Coen

== Personal life ==
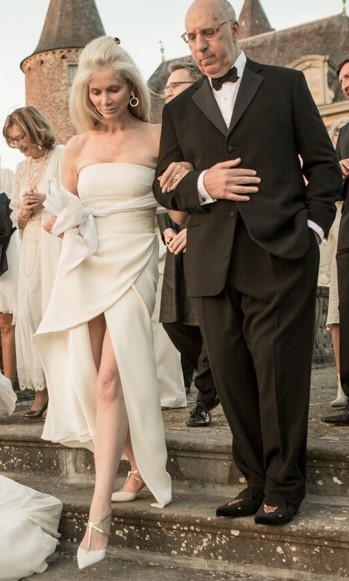
Rales and his wife Lalage in 2016

Rales was married to Christine Plank from 1983 to 2003. They have three children: Alexander, Gregory, and Stephanie. He married Lalage Damerell in 2012, the mother of writer and former CIA officer Amaryllis Fox Kennedy.

Rales was a major donor in the 2002 dedication of the Peeler Art Center at DePauw. As of November 2024, he held a net worth of $8.9 billion according to Forbes.
