= Mamie Parker =

American biologist and conservationist (born 1957)

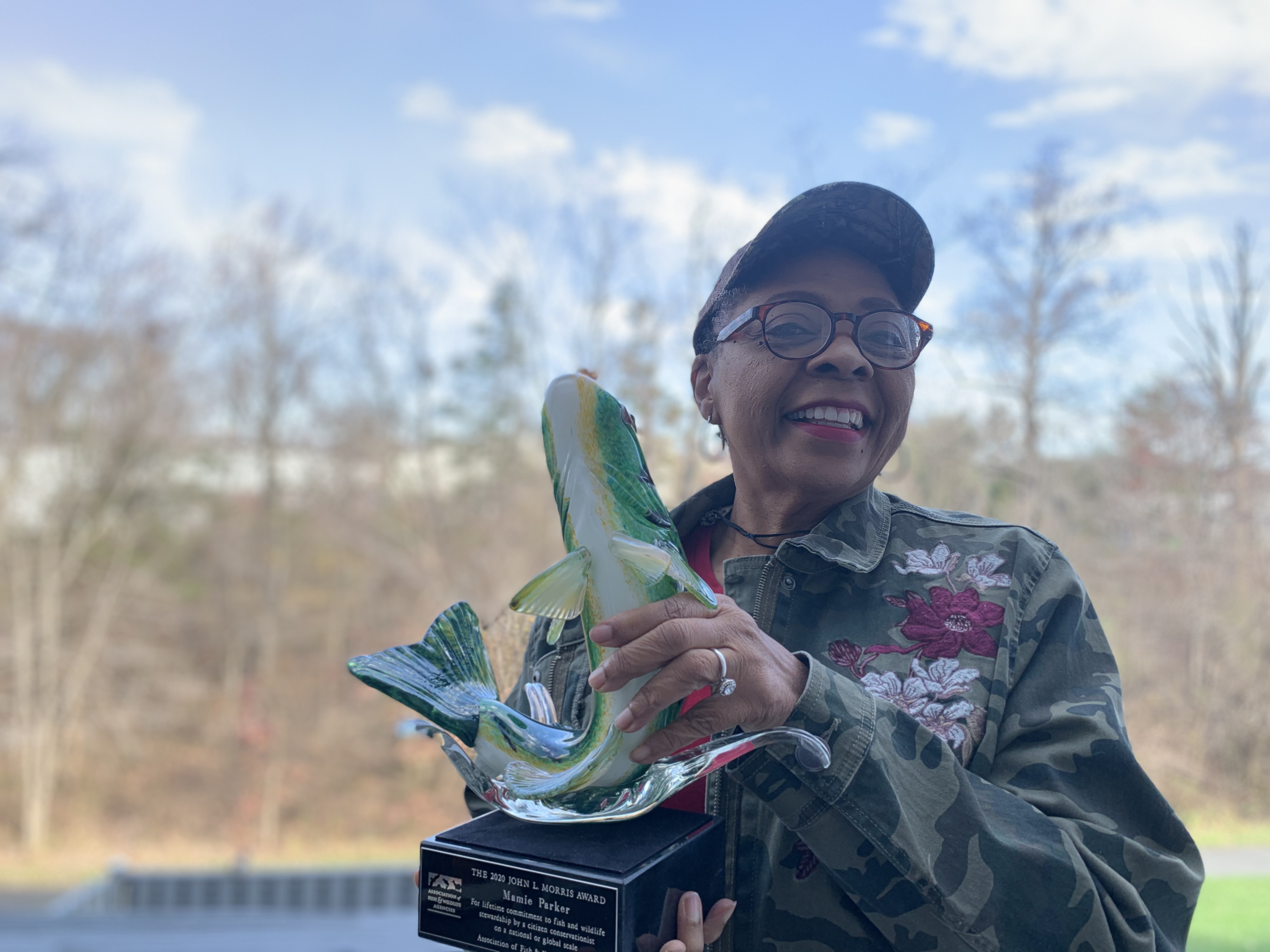
- Parker in 2020
- Born: October 14, 1957 (age 68)
- Education: University of Arkansas (BS); University of Wisconsin-Green Bay (MS, PhD)
- Awards: Presidential Rank Award; Arkansas Outdoor Hall of Fame; University of Arkansas-Pine Bluff Hall of Fame; Emmeline Moore Prize; USFWS Ira Gabrielson Leadership Award; William K. Reilly Environmental Leadership Award; 2020 John L. Morris Award by the Association of Fish and Wildlife Agencies
- Scientific career
- Fields: Biology; Conservation; Fisheries
- Workplaces: US Fish and Wildlife Service

Mamie Parker (born October 14, 1957) is an American biologist, conservationist, executive coach, facilitator, and inspirational speaker from Wilmot, Arkansas. She holds a PhD in limnology from the University of Wisconsin and spent 30 years with the United States Fish and Wildlife Service (USFWS) in a variety of positions in Wisconsin, Minnesota, Missouri, Georgia, and Washington, D.C. Highly regarded as a pioneer in the field, she was the first Black woman to serve as the assistant director of Fisheries and Habitat Conservation and the first African American to lead a USFWS regional office when she served as the Northeast Service Regional Director, covering 13 northeastern states. She also served as USFWS Chief of Staff and Chief of Fisheries. She received the US government's highest honor for career service employees for her accomplishments, the Presidential Rank Meritorious Service Award, and in 2005 was the first African American inducted into the Arkansas Outdoor Hall of Fame. Since retiring from USFWS, she has worked as an executive leadership coach, inspirational speaker, and environmental consultant with Ma Parker and Associates and EcoLogix Group, Inc. She is on the board of directors of the National Wildlife Federation, Chesapeake Bay Foundation, Duke University Nicholas School of the Environment, The Nature Conservancy-Virginia Chapter, American University School of Public Affairs, Ducks Unlimited, and the Student Conservation Association. Throughout her career she has worked to advance diversity and opportunities for minority students in conservation and fisheries careers; in 2016 she was awarded the Emmeline Moore Prize from the American Fisheries Society for these efforts.

== Early life and education ==
Parker was born and raised in Wilmot, Arkansas, the youngest of 11 children. Her mother was a single parent and supported the family by working as a sharecropper. Her interest in the outdoors started in childhood, inspired by her mother who was an avid angler and outdoorswoman, and her interest in biology began in high school when a biology teacher introduced her to issues of environmental degradation. Parker holds a BS in biology from the University of Arkansas at Pine Bluff (UAPB), and an MS in fish and wildlife management and PhD in limnology, both from the University of Wisconsin-Green Bay (UW). Her work at UW included researching ways to clean contaminants and pollutants from the Great Lakes and its tributaries. She has also completed executive leadership training at the Harvard University John F. Kennedy School of Government.

== Career ==
=== United States Fish and Wildlife Service ===
Parker was inspired to join the USFWS when Hannibal Bolton, a 1971 alumnus of the UAPB, visited the university to recruit students for a USFWS internship. She completed two internships with the USFWS, one in Wisconsin and one in Minnesota. She then moved to work for USFWS in the Columbia, Missouri Ecological Services Office, where she worked on providing ecological recommendations for federal permits and projects. She later was reassigned to work in the Missouri Bootheel region, the Midwest regional office in Minneapolis in 1990, and the Southeastern Regional Office in Atlanta in 1996, where she was appointed Deputy Assistant Regional Director of Fisheries and Deputy Geographic Assistant Regional Director in Arkansas, Louisiana and Mississippi.

In 1998, Parker moved to Washington, D.C. to serve as Special Assistant to the deputy director and Director (now known as Chief of Staff) in the USFWS headquarters in Washington D.C. where she worked with programs in all 50 states. In 1999, she moved to the North Atlantic-Appalachian regional field office and served as the Northeast Regional Director, covering 13 northeastern states from Maine to Virginia and West Virginia. She was the first African American to lead as the director of a regional USFWS office in the agency's history.

In 2003, she was appointed USFWS Assistant Director of Fisheries and Habitat Conservation. She was the first Black woman to hold this position. In this position, she provided leadership on national projects, including the National Fish Habitat Action Partnership, and served as the facilitator at the White House Conference on the Environment. She also served as co-chair of the Aquatic Nuisance Species Task Force. She was awarded the Presidential Rank Meritorious Service Award, the highest award given to government employees, for her leadership in the creation of the National Fish Habitat Action Partnership.

=== Executive consulting ===
Since retiring from the USFWS in 2007, Parker has worked as an executive leadership coach and speaker. She is a member of the Brown Advisory Sustainable Investment Board and serves as a principal consultant of EcoLogix Group, Inc. and Ma Parker and Associates. Clients include the Gates Millennium Scholars Program, the Bureau of Land Management, Defense Language Institute, the USFWS, the Maryland Department of Labor, the Department of the Interior, Minnesota Department of Natural Resources, Maryland Port Administration, Maryland Department of Labor, the William J. Clinton Presidential Center, Little Rock Central High School National Historic Site, National Wild Turkey Federation, and Ducks Unlimited.

=== Mentoring and service ===
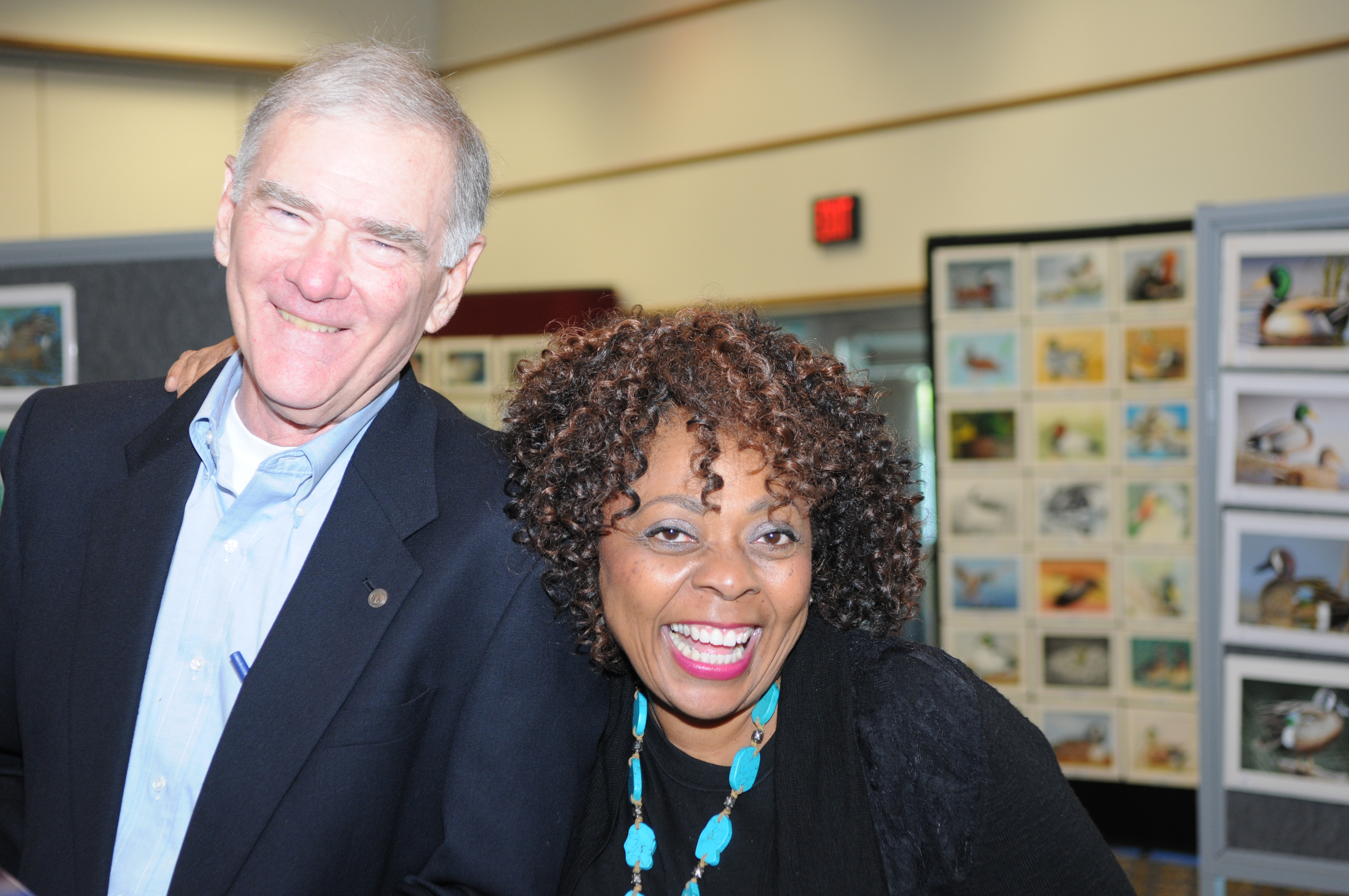
Dr. Mamie Parker and John Cornely at the USFWS stamp art contest, September 2013

Parker is views herself as a pioneer in her field for women of color and feels a "responsibility to do well". In a 2016 address, she noted: "As one of very few women of color working in conservation at that time, I was a pioneer. It can be lonely when you're a pioneer, because you're all by yourself." During her time at USFWS, Parker helped create Chicago Wilderness, a diverse coalition of conservation groups working to conserve areas in the Chicago metropolitan area. While at the USFWS Northeast regional office, she helped establish the USFWS "Invest in People" mentoring and professional leadership development program, which included opportunities for administrative personnel to get outdoors and experience some of the work conducted by field biologists; the program was later expanded to the D.C. headquarters and other regions throughout the country.

She has also promoted diversity in STEM by starting career awareness institutes at Tennessee Tech University and within USFWS to expose minority students from across the country to careers in fisheries. In her current work, she continues to help underserved communities and advance diversity and inclusion in STEM. She helps conduct Wild STEM workshops throughout the world, to expose more minority youth to careers in conservation. In a 2020 feature on her career, she noted:

"At this point in life, I have learned more about showing gratitude by giving back. This includes work to encourage others to help us address the climate crisis, particularly in vulnerable and underserved communities, by looking for opportunities to make a profound impact on the lives of women and diverse employees in conservation by working harder on diversity, inclusion, justice and equity. Serving in nominating and governance roles on multiple boards, I recruit and retain diversity."

In 2016, she was awarded the Emmeline Moore Prize from the American Fisheries Society for her work promoting diversity and opportunity for minorities in fisheries education and careers. She has written about supporting and mentoring minority students in fisheries, including a chapter entitled Mentoring Minorities for More Effective Fisheries Management and Conservation, published in The Future of Fisheries: Perspectives for Emerging Professionals by the American Fisheries Society. On encouraging minority youth to enter conservation careers, she has said:

"When I speak to youth, I tell them about my story as a pioneer conservationist and call them to action....I ask them to think about the things they can do to better their communities. Several youth have expressed interest in pursuing careers in conservation, marine biology and environmental justice, fighting the environmental inequality that communities of color often face."

Parker is currently a speaker with the Diverse Environmental Leaders Speakers Bureau and serves on the board of the Chesapeake Conservancy, the National Wildlife Refuge Association Board of Directors Advisory Council, Marstel-Day's Advisory Council, and Brown Advisory's Board of Directors on the Sustainable Investing Advisory Board. She also serves or has served on the boards of the U.S. Fish and Wildlife Service Retirees Association, Student Conservation Association, The Virginia Chapter of the Nature Conservancy, Duke University's Nicholas School of the Environment, Duke University School of the Environment Visitors Board, the Potomac Conservancy, the Chesapeake Bay Foundation, and Defenders of Wildlife. She was appointed by Governor Terry McAuliffe to the Virginia Department of Game and Inland Fisheries.

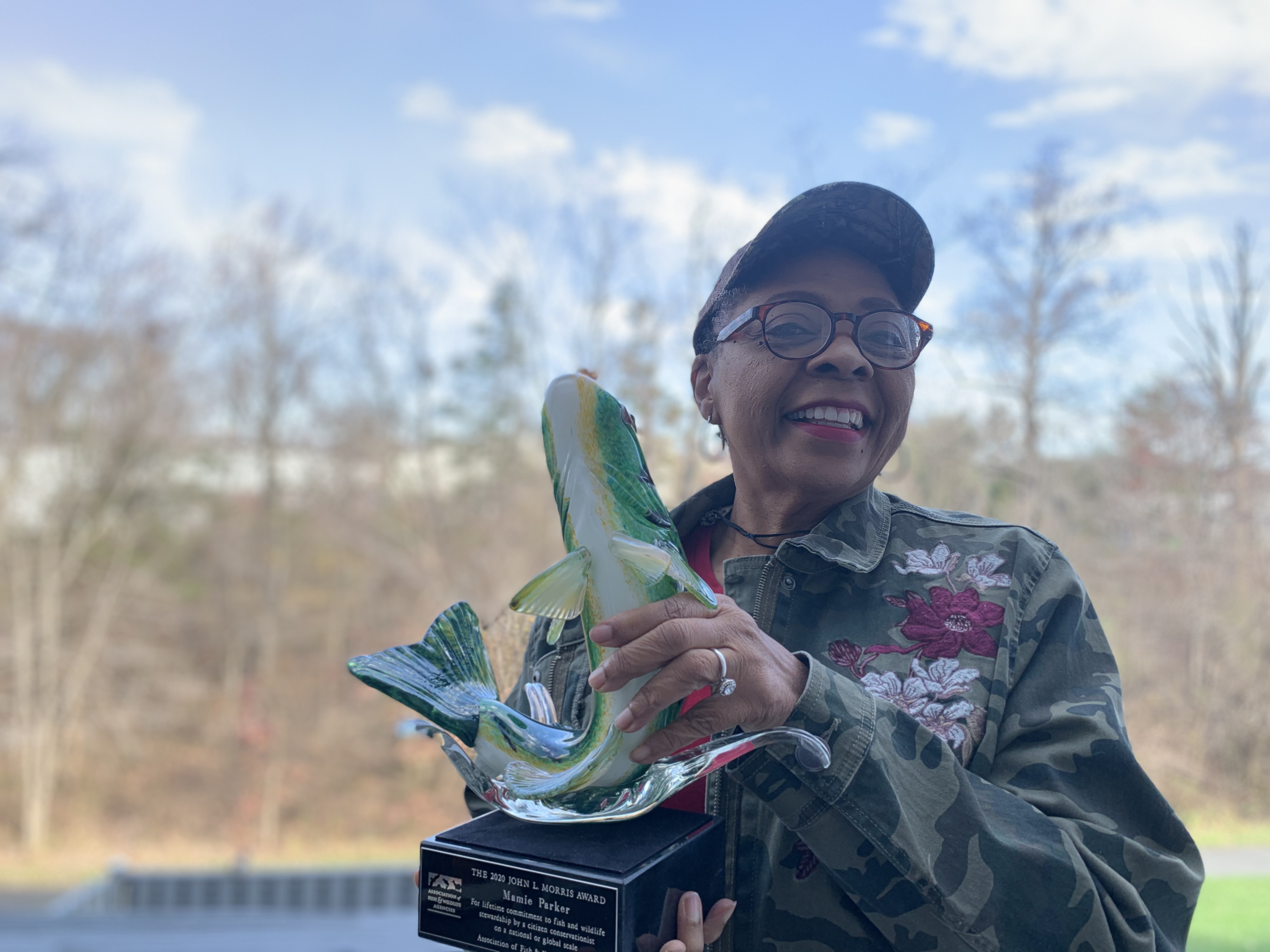
Dr. Mamie Parker is the recipient of The 2020 John L. Morris Award by the Association of Fish and Wildlife Agencies

== Awards and honors ==
- Inducted into University of Arkansas at Pine Bluff Hall of Fame
- Named the University of Arkansas at Pine Bluff Simon Haley Distinguished Lecturer
- The Council of Women World Leaders awarded her with an Aspen Institute Fellowship where she worked in the Kingdom of Lesotho and in Cape Town and Johannesburg, South Africa.
- Department of Interior's Silver Award, presented by the Secretary of the USFWS
- Member of Alpha Kappa Alpha sorority.
- USFWS Advanced Leadership Development Program - Ira Gabrielson Leadership Award for outstanding leader of the year
- Presidential Rank Meritorious Service Award
- Appointed by Governor Terry McAuliffe to the Virginia Department of Game and Inland Fisheries
- 1999: Appointed USFWS Northeast Regional Director
- 2002: Good Housekeeping Magazine Women in Government Leadership Award
- 2003: Appointed USFWS Assistant Director of Fisheries and Habitat Conservation
- 2005: Inducted into the Arkansas Outdoor Hall of Fame
- 2015: Champion of the Chesapeake from Chesapeake Conservancy
- 2016: Emmeline Moore Prize from the American Fisheries Society for "exemplary service to the cause of equal opportunity of access to higher education in fisheries and/or professional development in any of the disciplines of fisheries science or management"
- 2018: William K. Reilly Environmental Leadership Award from American University School of Public Affairs' Center for Environmental Policy
- 2020: Recipient of The 2020 John L. Morris Award by the Association of Fish and Wildlife Agencies
