= List of Mexican films of 2015 =

This is a list of Mexican films released in 2015.

Title	Director	Cast	Genre	Notes
600 Miles	Gabriel Ripstein	Tim Roth	Drama	
Epitaph	Rubén Imaz, Yulene Olaizola			
Scherzo Diabolico	Adrián García Bogliano	Francisco Barreiro, Daniela Soto Brenner Pablo Guisa Koestinger, Milena Pezzi	Comedy horror	
Una última y nos vamos	Noé Santillán-López	Martha Higareda, Héctor Bonilla, Alejandro Calva, Mauricio Argüelles, José Sefami, Hernán Mendoza, Roberto Medina, Cesar Rodriguez, Ernesto Loera, Oliver Nava, Mariana Treviño	Comedy, Road Movie	

== See also ==
- List of 2015 box office number-one films in Mexico
