= Louella =

- Gender: Female
- Language: English

Origin
- Origin: England

Other names
- Alternative spelling: Luella
- Nickname: Lue or Lou
- Derived: Louise + Ella

Louella is a feminine given name which may refer to:

- Louella Ballerino (1900–1978), American fashion designer
- Louella E. Cable (1900–1986), American ichthyologist
- Louella Daetweiler (1918–2004), American baseball catcher
- Louella D. Everett (1883–1967), American poet
- Louella Maxam (1891–1970), American actress
- Louella Parsons (1881–1972), American movie columnist
- Louella Pettway (1921–2006), American artist
- Louella Tomlinson (born 1988), Australian basketball player
- Louella Caraway Lee, character in seasons 2-4 of the original Dallas TV show
- Louella McCoy, character in Sunrise on the Reaping, a novel by Suzanne Collins from The Hunger Games cycle and in the movie based on it.

== See also ==
- "Louella", a song by Pat Boone from his EP Four by Pat, 1957
- Wayne, Pennsylvania, an unincorporated community in Pennsylvania originally named Louella
- Louella Persons written by Secun de la Rosa
