= Conservation conveyance =

The Conservation Conveyance is a 2003 statute, Title 10 of the United States Code, section 2694(a), authorizing military departments to convey surplus real property to states, local governments, or private, land-acquiring non-profit conservators for perpetual conservation use.

The Conservation Conveyance is unique to the U.S. Department of Defense (DoD), allowing it to transfer closed military bases into permanent conservation status. According to a January, 2005 Report by the United States Government Accountability Office (GAO), titled Military Base Closures: Updated Status of Prior Base Realignments and Closures (BRAC): “This method was used by DOD for the first time in September 2003 to transfer property for natural resource and conservation purposes. Under this method, the U.S. Army transferred almost 58,000 acres (230 km^{2}) from the Sierra Army Depot, California, to the Honey Lake Conservation Team, which is made up of two nonprofit organizations—the Center for Urban Watershed Renewal and the Trust for Public Land—and two private-sector companies. This is the largest single transfer of surplus BRAC property that the Army has undertaken. Nearly 22 percent of the BRAC acreage transferred to nonfederal users in the prior rounds was accomplished through this method.” The Army describes its first experience with the Conservation Conveyance in an article titled Army Finds Success in New Method of Returning Land to Civilian Use.

The Conservation Conveyance was created by Rebecca R. Rubin, founder and President of Marstel-Day, LLC as a technique for transferring closed military bases into permanent conservation status, an accomplishment for which she received the Association of Defense Communities’ 2008 Private Sector Leader of the Year Award. To date, approximately 68,000 acres (280 km^{2}) of land have been permanently conserved using this approach. Ms. Rubin also hosts an audio program entitled “Vital Voices of the Environment” in which she interviews environmental thinkers and planners of our times, each of whom offers a perspective on the key issues now and for the environmental future of our planet.
