= NatureServe =

American non-profit organization

- Formation: 1994
- Purpose: To leverage the power of science, data, and technology to guide biodiversity conservation and stewardship.
- Location: Arlington, Virginia, US
- Region served: North America
- Website: www.natureserve.org
- Formerly called: Association for Biodiversity Information

NatureServe, Inc. is a nonprofit organization based in Arlington County, Virginia, US, that provides proprietary wildlife conservation-related data, tools, and services to private and government clients, partner organizations, and the public. NatureServe reports being "headquartered in Arlington, Virginia, with regional offices in four U.S. locations and in Canada". In calendar year 2011 it reported having 86 employees, 6 volunteers, and 15 independent officers.

== History ==
The Nature Conservancy reports that in 2000 it spun off its 85-center Natural Heritage Network "into a new independent organization, the Association for Biodiversity Information (later renamed NatureServe)." NatureServe reports that it was established in 1994 as the Association for Biodiversity Information. In 2001 the IRS approved a name change to NatureServe that was requested in 1999, while maintaining the organization's 501(c)(3) tax-exempt status granted in July 1995. NatureServe's website declares that it is a 501(c)(3) non-profit, tax-exempt corporation incorporated in 1999 as a Washington, DC Nonprofit Corporation.

== Programs ==
NatureServe's programs focus on four main areas:

- Documenting the conservation status and location of species and ecosystems
- Producing analyses to guide conservation planning
- Developing software tools to guide conservation planning
- Managing natural heritage programs and conservation data centers

NatureServe partners with IUCN Red List, the accepted standard for worldwide imperiled species classification, providing coordination assistance and data from their own assessments to the IUCN's conservation assessments, and working together on ongoing assessments.

NatureServe Explorer is a web-based database provides public access to NatureServe's proprietary information on US and Canadian ecosystems and plant, animal, and fungus species. This includes ranked NatureServe conservation status assessment data on state, national, and global levels, considered a leading classification of imperiled species in the United States. InfoNatura was a nearly identical service providing information on Latin American wildlife and ecosystems.

NatureServe maintains the National Vegetation Classification Standard for the United States as well as the International Classification of Ecological Communities, currently focused on the Western Hemisphere.

== The NatureServe network ==
The natural heritage network now supported by NatureServe, began in 1974 with the creation of the South Carolina Heritage Trust. After working with Patrick Noonan, president of The Nature Conservancy (TNC), to arrange the donation of the 24,000-acre (97 km^{2}) Santee Coastal Reserve, Joseph Hudson, chairman of South Carolina's Wildlife and Marine Resources Department, wanted to identify other preservation-worthy lands in the state. He provided TNC with initial funding to amass information that could inform conservation and land-use decision-making while accounting for impacts on biodiversity.

While establishing that first program, TNC chief scientist Robert Jenkins Jr., chose to focus on biological features in need of conservation, and to use this information to suggest priority sites for protection. Targeted features included both species and natural communities, or elements of natural diversity.

Programs in West Virginia, Mississippi, and Oregon followed in 1975. By 1976, TNC had developed a model for expanding the emerging state network: go to the states and offer to hire and train a staff of biologists, establish an operating center, and, two years later, let the state take over operations. By 1993, the U.S. network consisted of organizations in all fifty states. Programs were formed in Latin American countries in 1982, and the Canadian programs first established in 1988 now extend to all provinces and Yukon Territory.

By the early 1990s, a group of natural heritage program directors began to develop network-wide information products. This effort led to the establishment of an independent nonprofit organization devoted to promoting the products and services of the network. Incorporated in 1994 as the Association for Biodiversity Information (ABI), this membership organization created the framework for network-wide coordination. In 1999, TNC's natural heritage network and ABI formally joined forces, with the Conservancy transferring its databases, professional staff, and scientific standards and methodology to ABI. In 2001, having grown into its present form, this new, independent nonprofit became known as NatureServe.

== Financial information ==
NatureServe Inc.'s 2011 IRS Form 990 lists total revenue of $8,680,216 and total expenses of $8,892,007.

The corporation's fiscal year 2011 audited financial statement says that "the accompanying notes are an integral part of these financial statements." It reports "total revenue, gains, and other support" of $9,499,301, and "total expenses" of $8,913,138. $7,932,133 of revenue came from grants and contracts, including a sizable portion in federal awards for mapping services, wildlife assessments, and other products and services. It also reports $186,290 in revenue from general contributions, $56,470 in revenue from membership dues, and $216,062 in fundraising expenses.

Some major contributions are made in the form of grants for specific projects. The MacArthur Foundation reported that they awarded $1,191,500 in grants to NatureServe between 2003 and 2013, and NatureServe announced that the Doris Duke Charitable Foundation awarded two grants totaling nearly $800,000 in 2005. Between 2004 and 2009, the Gordon and Betty Moore Foundation donated $6.63 million, the Nature Conservency donated $3.43 million, the Knoblock Family Foundation donated $2.38 million, and the Doris Duke Charitable Foundation donated $1.21 million.
