= Louella E. Cable =

American ichthyologist (1900–1986)

- Born: July 5, 1900; Chamberlain, South Dakota, U.S.
- Died: May 25, 1986 (aged 85)
- Resting place: Riverview Cemetery, Chamberlain, South Dakota
- Education: University of South Dakota, University of Michigan
- Scientific career
- Fields: Ichthyology
- Workplaces: U.S. Fish & Wildlife Service
- Thesis: Validity of Age Determination from Scales, and Growth of Marked Lake Michigan Lake Trout (1959)

Louella E. Cable (July 5, 1900 – May 25, 1986) was a pioneering American ichthyologist and scientific illustrator for the U.S. Bureau of Fisheries, which later became the U.S. Fish & Wildlife Service. She was the first woman professional biologist at the Bureau and made significant contributions to the understanding of fish life cycles, successfully culturing several species through their larval stages for the first time in a lab setting.

Cable's research was instrumental in efforts to conserve and restore shad fisheries in the Chesapeake Bay watershed during the 1940s. She later shifted her focus to the Great Lakes, where she studied the decline of lake trout and other freshwater species. Over her 43-year career, she authored numerous scientific publications and was recognized for her work by Secretary of the Interior Harold L. Ickes. A species of goby from the Galápagos Islands, the Cable's goby, is named in her honor.

== Biography ==
Louella E. Cable was born in Chamberlain, South Dakota on July 5, 1900. She received a teacher's certificate from Dakota Wesleyan University and B.A. (1926) and M.A. (1927) degrees from the University of South Dakota.

In 1927, the U.S. Bureau of Fisheries hired Cable to assist Samuel Frederick Hildebrand at its research station and lab in Beaufort, North Carolina. Working as a scientific illustrator, Cable was the first woman professional biologist at the Bureau. Cable's illustrations won praise in the scientific community and notoriety in the popular press. In her lab in 1929–1930, Cable successfully cultured several fish through their larval stages, a ground-breaking accomplishment: prior to this time, for many species, their early life cycles were only known from capture of wild specimens.

In 1937, Cable turned her research attention to shad in South Carolina's Edisto River. By 1941, she was studying the family of fishes in the Chesapeake Bay watershed, and in 1942 Cable was named chair of a multi-state committee dedicated to restoring the Bay's shad fisheries. With Robert A. Nesbitt, in 1943 she presented her research to Select Committee on Conservation of Wildlife Resources of the House of Representatives. Cable wrote a nationally syndicated article, "Delaware Shad Fishing Has Suffered Great Reduction," in August 1944, arguing for a 50 percent reduction in annual catch tonnage in order to restore the fishery. Along with fellow Fish and Wildlife Service scientist Lucille Farrier Stickel, Cable was praised by Secretary of the Interior Harold L. Ickes in a press release, as well as in an October 1945 article on the wire services, "Women Scientists Helped Yanks Win the War."

In 1950, working from Ann Arbor, Michigan, Cable shifted her focus to the fisheries of the Great Lakes, studying ciscoes and the decline of lake trout. She received a Ph.D. in Fisheries Biology from the University of Michigan in 1959. From 1957 to 1964, she led the agency's fish hatchery in Northville, researching ciscoes and other freshwater whitefish species. Cable retired in 1970 after 43 years of service.

A fish from the Galápagos Islands, Cable's goby, was named for Louella Cable by Isaac Ginsburg. Cable called his attention to the fish's ventral fins, which are not united. Cable was, for a time, one of two female members of the American Fisheries Society, along with Emmeline Moore.

Cable died on 25 May 1986. She left her estate to the University of South Dakota to endow the Louella E. Cable Memorial Scholarship for zoology students.

== Selected publications ==
- Cable, Louella E. (1928), Food of Bullheads, Bureau of Fisheries document; no. 1037, U.S. Bureau of Fisheries, pp. 27–41 Appendix II to the Report of the U.S. Commissioner of Fisheries for 1928. Document no. 1037.
- Hildebrand, Samuel F.; Cable, Louella E. (1930). "Development and life history of fourteen teleostean fishes at Beaufort, N.C." Bulletin of the Bureau of Fisheries. 46: 383–488. Document no. 1093.
- Hildebrand, Samuel F.; Cable, Louella E. (1938). "Further notes on the development and life history of some teleosts at Beaufort, N.C.". Bulletin (24). U.S. Bureau of Fisheries.
- Cable, Louella E. (January 1950). "A Cheek Tag for Marking Fish, with Semi-Automatic Pliers for Application of Tag". ICES Journal of Marine Science. 16 (2): 185–191. doi:10.1093/icesjms/16.2.185.
- Cable, Louella E. (1956). "Validity of Age Determination from Scales, and Growth of Marked Lake Michigan Lake Trout" (PDF). Fishery Bulletin of the Fish and Wildlife Service. 57 (107).
- Cable, Louella E.; van-Haagen, Richard H. (1 September 1967). "Digital Caliper". Copeia. 1967 (3): 683–685. doi:10.2307/1442258. JSTOR 1442258.

== Bibliography ==
- Larson, Todd E. A. (2021), "Louella E. Cable (1900-1986)", in Springer, Craig (ed.), America's Bountiful Waters: 150 Years of Fisheries Conservation and the U. S. Fish & Wildlife Service, Guilford, CT: Stackpole Books, pp. 131–132
