= Garcia River Forest =

Forest in Mendocino County, California

Coordinates: 38°57′16″N 123°44′01″W

The Garcia River Forest is a 24,000-acre (97 km^{2}) forest located in Mendocino County, California, about 100 miles (160 km) north of San Francisco. It is owned and managed by The Conservation Fund. The fund generates CO_{2} credits by logging a portion of the forest less intensely than is allowed under California law. These credits are sold to PG&E which retires them on behalf of customers enrolled in its ClimateSmart program. PG&E's ClimateSmart program is a program where customers voluntarily pay more on their utility bill to offset a percentage of their GHG emissions.

The California Climate Action Registry (CCAR) conducts and monitors The Garcia River Forest Project in order to restore forests to reduce global warming.
