= Eleotrica =

Conservation status
- Least Concern (IUCN 3.1)

Scientific classification
- Kingdom: Animalia
- Phylum: Chordata
- Class: Actinopterygii
- Order: Gobiiformes
- Family: Gobiidae
- Genus: Eleotrica; Ginsburg, 1933
- Species: E. cableae

Binomial name
- Eleotrica cableae Ginsburg, 1933

Synonyms
- For Genus Eleotrica: Alepideleotris Herre, 1935

Genus of fishes

Cable's goby (Eleotrica cableae) is a species of goby endemic to reefs around the Galápagos Islands. This species grows to a length of 7 centimetres (2.8 in) SL. This species is the only known member of its genus. The specific name honours the United States Government biologist Louella E. Cable (1900–1986), who illustrated this goby for the describer Isaac Ginsburg, and drew his attention to its separated ventral fins.
