= Tragic Jungle =

2020 film

- Film poster
- Spanish: Selva trágica
- Directed by: Yulene Olaizola
- Written by: Rubén Imaz; Yulene Olaizola
- Starring: Indira Rubie Andrewin; Gilberto Barraza; Mariano Tun Xool
- Production companies: Malacosa Cine; Varios Lobos; Manny Films
- Distributed by: Netflix
- Release dates: September 2020 (Venice); 9 June 2021
- Running time: 96 minutes
- Country: Mexico
- Language: Spanish

Tragic Jungle (Spanish: Selva trágica) is a 2020 Mexican adventure drama mystery film directed by Yulene Olaizola, written by Rubén Imaz and Yulene Olaizola and starring Indira Rubie Andrewin, Gilberto Barraza and Mariano Tun Xool. The film premiered at the 2020 Venice Film Festival.

== Cast ==
- Indira Rubie Andrewin as Agnes
- Gilberto Barraza as Ausencio
- Mariano Tun Xool as Jacinto
- Eligio Meléndez as Don Mundo
- Gabino Rodríguez as El Caimán
- Shantai Obispo as Florence
- Cornelius McLaren as Norm
- Gildon Roland as Gildon
- Dale Carley as Cacique
- Ian Flowers as Ian
- José Alfredo González Dzul as Campechano
- Antonio Tun Xool as Hilario
- Eliseo Mancilla as el Faisán
- Marcelino Cobá Flota as Lazarito
- Mario Canché as Yucateco

== Reception ==
On the review aggregator website Rotten Tomatoes, 73% of 26 critics' reviews are positive, with an average rating of 6.5/10. The website's critics consensus reads, "A searing contemporary fable that deftly taps into its often ignored subject, Tragic Jungle is an otherworldly journey into the heart of darkness." Metacritic, which uses a weighted average, assigned the film a score of 70 out of 100, based on 4 critics, indicating "generally favorable" reviews.
