= Bartlett's Familiar Quotations =

Book by John Bartlett

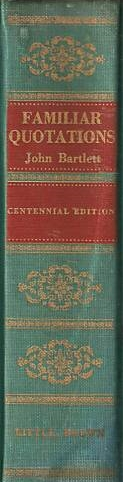
- The binding of the 13th edition, known as the Centennial Edition and published in 1955
- Author: John Bartlett and others subsequently
- Language: English
- Genre: Notable quotations
- Published: Little, Brown and Company
- Publication place: United States

Bartlett's Familiar Quotations, often simply called Bartlett's, is an American reference work that is the longest-lived and most widely distributed collection of quotations. The book was first issued in 1855 and is currently in its 19th edition, published in 2022.

The book arranges its entries by author, rather than by subject, unlike many other quotation collections, and enters the authors chronologically by date of birth rather than alphabetically. Within years, authors are arranged alphabetically and quotations are arranged chronologically within each author's entry, followed by attributed remarks whose source in the author's writings has not been confirmed. The book contains a thorough keyword index and details the source of each quotation.

== History ==
=== 19th century ===
John Bartlett, an American publisher and writer, who ran the University Book Store in Cambridge, Massachusetts, was frequently asked for information on quotations. Bartlett began a commonplace book, including quotations from his own extensive readings and memory. In 1855, Bartlett acknowledged in the book's preface that, "this Collection ... has been considerably enlarged by additions from an English work on a similar plan," a reference to Handbook of Familiar Quotations from English Authors, written by Isabella Rushton Preston in 1853.

In 1855, Bartlett privately printed his compilation as A Collection of Familiar Quotations. This first edition included 258 pages of quotations by 169 authors, chiefly the Bible, William Shakespeare, and the great English poets. Bartlett wrote in the fourth edition that "it is not easy to determine in all cases the degree of familiarity that may belong to phrases and sentences which present themselves for admission; for what is familiar to one class of readers may be quite new to another."

The book was a great success, and Bartlett authored and published three additional editions before joining the Boston publishing firm of Little, Brown and Company. Bartlett rose to be the senior partner of the firm, and supervised the publication of nine additional editions prior to his death in 1905, selling over 300,000 copies. The seventh edition was published in 1875, the eighth edition in 1882, and the ninth in 1891. The 10th edition, however, did not appear for another 20 years.

=== 20th century ===
Edited by Nathan Haskell Dole, the 10th edition was published in 1914, and was much like its predecessors. The book began with quotations originally in English, arranged them chronologically by author; Geoffrey Chaucer was the first entry and Mary Frances Butts the last. The quotes were chiefly from literary sources. A "miscellaneous" section followed, including quotations in English from politicians and scientists, such as "fifty-four forty or fight!". A section of translations followed, including mainly quotes from the ancient Greeks and Romans. The last section was devoted to the Bible and the Book of Common Prayer. Quotations were arranged in a single column.

The 11th edition, published in 1937 and edited by Christopher Morley and Louella D. Everett, expanded the page size and created a two-column format, making it the first edition that is recognizable to users of the modern work. The 12th edition, published in 1948, was also edited by Morley and Everett.

The 13th edition, published in 1955, was billed by the publisher as the "Centennial Edition". While the work was credited to the editors of Little, Brown, the preface gives special thanks to Morley and Everett and Emily Morison Beck. The volume continued to add more recent material, such as quotes from cartoonist Bill Mauldin and Queen Elizabeth II. Beck edited the 14th edition, published in 1968, and the 15th edition, published in 1980.

Aram Bakshian argued that Beck's work on the 15th edition was the start of the work's downfall, writing that, "Donning the intellectual bell-bottoms and platform shoes of its era, Bartlett's began spouting third-rate Third World, youth-culture, and feminist quotes", part of "a middle-aged obsession with staying trendy."

Following Beck's retirement, Little, Brown appointed a new editor, Justin Kaplan, whose book on Mark Twain, Mr. Clemens and Mark Twain, won the 1967 Pulitzer Prize. Kaplan's 16th edition, published in 1993, was met with criticism in part because he included only three minor Ronald Reagan quotations and commented publicly that he despised Reagan. In comparison, Franklin D. Roosevelt was given 35 entries and John F. Kennedy 28. Jonathan Siegel, who edited the Macmillan Book of Political Quotations, said Kaplan was "an insult to the memory of John Bartlett and the ideologically inclusive spirit of the first fifteen editions." Kaplan was also criticized for including pop culture material that was considered neither familiar nor durable.

=== 21st century ===
Similar criticisms were leveled against Kaplan's 17th edition, published in 2003, which for the first time included entries from J. K. Rowling, Jerry Seinfeld, and Larry David. But classics were cut, including eleven quotations by Alexander Pope and high-sounding sentimental quotes that Kaplan considered not worthy of inclusion. Kaplan did, however, expand his number of quotations from Ronald Reagan from three to six, telling USA Today, "I admit I was carried away by prejudice. Mischievously I did him dirt."

The 18th edition, published in 2012, was edited by poet, critic, and editor Geoffrey O'Brien, who was also the editor-in-chief of the Library of America. He continues as editor of the 19th edition, published in 2022.

== See also ==
- The Oxford Dictionary of Quotations
- The Yale Book of Quotations
