= Geoffrey O'Brien =

American poet, editor, book and film critic, translator, and cultural historian

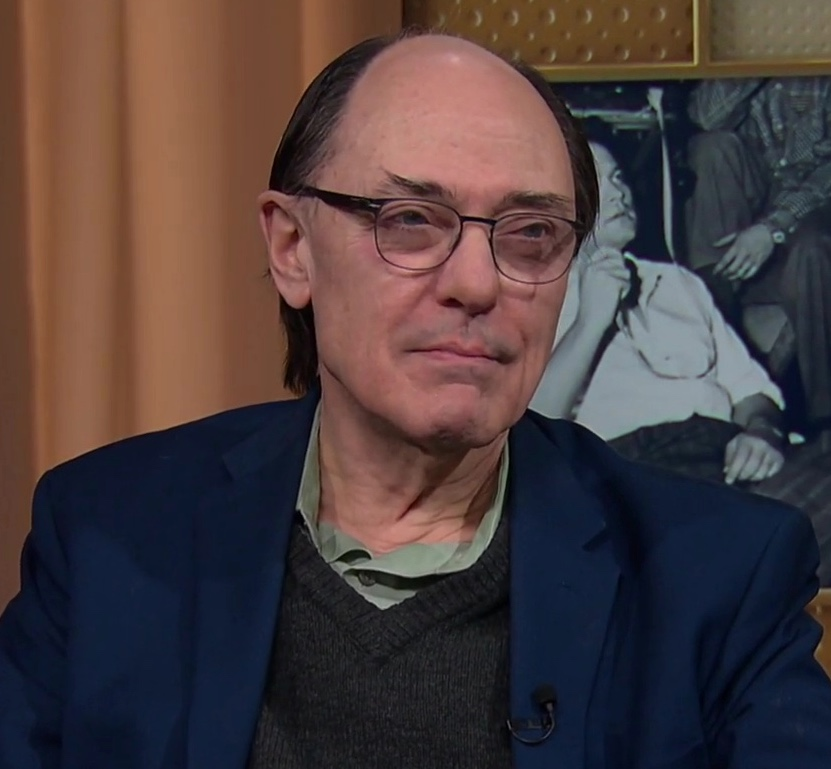
- O'Brien on CUNY TV's City Cinematheque, 2025
- Born: 1948 (age 77–78); New York City, New York, United States
- Occupations: Poet, editor, critic, translator, historian

Geoffrey O'Brien (born 1948) is an American poet, editor, book and film critic, translator, and cultural historian. In 1992, he joined the staff of the Library of America as executive editor, becoming editor-in-chief in 1998.

== Biography ==
O'Brien was born in New York City and grew up in Great Neck, Long Island. His mother, Margaret O'Brien, née Owens, was a theater actress, and his father was Joseph O'Brien, one of the original WMCA Good Guys.

O'Brien began publishing poetry and criticism in the 1960s. He has been a contributor to Artforum, Film Comment, The New York Times and The New York Times Book Review, Village Voice, New Republic, Bookforum, and, especially, to the New York Review of Books. He has also been published in numerous other publications, including Filmmaker, American Heritage, The Armchair Detective, Bomb, Boston Globe, Fence, GQ, The Los Angeles Times Book Review, Men's Vogue, Mother Jones, The Nation, Newsday and Slate, and has contributed many essays for liner notes for The Criterion Collection. In addition, his work has been included in numerous anthologies.

He has served as editor of The Reader's Catalog (1987–1991), a faculty member of The Writing Program at The New School, a contributing editor at Open City, and was a member of the selection committee for The New York Film Festival in 2003.

== Literary style ==
Erudite but playful, O'Brien's style as an essayist and reviewer is unique. His dense, highbrow prose is often brought to bear upon the worlds of low-budget exploitation films and pulp fiction as well as more upscale and respectable venues. These wide-ranging pieces have been described as idiosyncratic "prose poems" and tend towards partial autobiography in which he recollects youthful experiences as a reader or viewer which — although they may or may not have been shared by his readership — can lead deeply into unexpected aspects of the material at hand. Publishers Weekly noted "O'Brien's remarkable sensitivity" in Sonata for Jukebox, adding that "[m]ost striking, however, are the essays in which O'Brien explores the way music defined—and now defines how he remembers—his own formative youthful experiences, from the influence of his father, a popular radio disk jockey, to the way the pop music of the 1960s defined how he and his friends lived."

Writing in Bookforum, Robert P. Baird described Early Autumn as a "book of elegant, often moving poems" "written so comfortably in the elegiac mode that [O'Brien] sometimes makes us forget poetry was equipped to handle any other." Nathaniel Tarn wondered whether O'Brien, in Red Sky Café, "endows these poems with such a flowing sense of narrative, so that, together with everything else you expect from a poem today, you get such a wonderful and rare gift: a story that you can read as such as if the poem were a novel in micrograms?" Tarn concluded that "O'Brien is hands down the most elegant poet writing today."

== Awards and accolades ==
- 1988 Whiting Award
- 1994 Finalist, National Book Critics Circle Award (Criticism)
- 1998 Fellow, New York Institute for the Humanities
- 1999 Fellow, John Simon Guggenheim Memorial Foundation
- 2002 Fellow, Rockefeller Foundation, Bellagio Study Center, Italy
- 2011 Fellow, Bosch Public Policy Prize, American Academy in Berlin

== Books ==
=== Reviews and cultural criticism ===
- O'Brien, Geoffrey (1981). Hardboiled America: Lurid Paperbacks and the Masters of Noir. Da Capo Press. ISBN 978-0-306-80773-2. (reprint 1997)
- O'Brien, Geoffrey (1988). Dreamtime: Chapters from the Sixties. Counterpoint. ISBN 978-1-58243-191-8. (reprint Counterpoint Press, 2002, ISBN 978-1-58243-191-8)
- O'Brien, Geoffrey (1995). The Phantom Empire: Movies in the Mind of the Twentieth Century. W. W. Norton & Company. ISBN 978-0-393-31296-6.
- O'Brien, Geoffrey (1998). The Times Square Story. W. W. Norton & Company. ISBN 978-0-393-31846-3.
- O'Brien, Geoffrey (1998), Bardic Deadlines: Reviewing Poetry 1984–1995, University of Michigan Press.
- O'Brien, Geoffrey (2000). The Browser's Ecstasy: A Meditation on Reading. Counterpoint. ISBN 978-1-58243-245-8. (reprint Counterpoint Press, 2003, ISBN 978-1-58243-245-8)
- O'Brien, Geoffrey (2001), Doing It: Five Performing Arts, New York Review of Books (One of 5 authors)
- O'Brien, Geoffrey (2002). Castaways of the image planet: movies, show business, public spectacle. Counterpoint. ISBN 978-1-58243-190-1.
- O'Brien, Geoffrey (2004). Sonata for Jukebox : Pop Music, Memory, and the Imagined Life. Counterpoint. ISBN 978-1-58243-329-5. "geoffrey o'brien." (Paperback title: Sonata for Jukebox: An Autobiography of My Ears, Counterpoint Press, 2005, ISBN 978-1-58243-329-5)

=== History ===
- O'Brien, Geoffrey (2010), The Fall of the House of Walworth: Madness and Murder in Gilded Age America, Henry Holt.

=== Poetry ===
- O'Brien, Geoffrey (1983). Maciste in the Valley of the Pagans. Three Bears Press.
- O'Brien, Geoffrey (1989). A Book of Maps. Red Dust. ISBN 978-0-87376-061-4.
- O'Brien, Geoffrey (1994). The Hudson Mystery. Red Dust. ISBN 978-0-87376-078-2.
- O'Brien, Geoffrey (1996). Floating City: Selected Poems 1978–1995. Talisman House. ISBN 978-1-883689-38-4.
- O'Brien, Geoffrey (2002). A View of Buildings and Water. Salt Publishing. ISBN 978-1-876857-55-4.
- O'Brien, Geoffrey (2005). Red Sky Café. Salt Publishing. ISBN 978-1-84471-071-3.
- O'Brien, Geoffrey (2010). Early Autumn. Salt Publishing. ISBN 978-1-84471-572-5.
- O'Brien, Geoffrey (2015). In a Mist. Shearsman. ISBN 9781848613607.
- O'Brien, Geoffrey (2020). Who Goes There. Dos Madres. ISBN 9781948017985.

=== Anthology contributor ===
- June Skinner Sawyers, ed. (2006). "Seven Fat Years". Read the Beatles: classic and new writings on the Beatles, their legacy, and why they still matter. Penguin Group. ISBN 978-0-14-303732-3.
- Mary Gaitskill; Daphne Carr, eds. (2006). "Will You Love Me Tomorrow". Da Capo Best Music Writing 2006: The Year's Finest Writing on Rock, Hip-Hop, Jazz, Pop, Country, & More. Da Capo Press. p. 119. ISBN 978-0-306-81499-0. "geoffrey o'brien."
- Eric Weisbard, ed. (2004). "Interrupted Symphony". This is pop: in search of the elusive at Experience Music Project. Harvard University Press. p. 90. ISBN 978-0-674-01321-6. "geoffrey o'brien."
- Richard Howard; David Lehman, eds. (1995). "The Interior Prisoner". The Best American Poetry 1995. Simon and Schuster. ISBN 978-0-684-80151-3.

=== Editor ===
- The Reader's Catalog: An Annotated Listing of the 40,000 Best Books in Print in Over 300 Categories (1989; Second Edition, 1997)
- American Poetry: The Twentieth Century, The Library of America, 2000
  - Volume One: Henry Adams to Dorothy Parker
  - Volume Two: E.E. Cummings to May Swenson
- O'Brien, Geoffrey (2004). Bartlett's Poems for Occasions. Little, Brown and Company. ISBN 978-0-316-73501-8.
- Bartlett, John. Bartlett's Familiar Quotations, editions 18th (2012) and 19th (2022) ISBN 978-0316375306
