= Fogo (film) =

2012 film

- Film poster
- Directed by: Yulene Olaizola
- Written by: Yulene Olaizola
- Produced by: Yulene Olaizola; Rubén Imaz
- Starring: Norman Foley
- Cinematography: Diego Garcia
- Release date: 20 May 2012 (Cannes)
- Running time: 61 minutes
- Countries: Mexico; Canada
- Language: English

Fogo is a 2012 Canadian-Mexican drama film directed by Yulene Olaizola. The film was screened in the Directors' Fortnight section at the 2012 Cannes Film Festival.

== Cast ==
- Norman Foley
- Ron Broders
- Joseph Dwyer
