= The Conservation Fund =

U.S. non-profit organization

- Founded: 1985
- Founder: Pat Noonan
- Location: Arlington, Virginia
- Region served: United States
- Method: The fund's conservation strategy is through balancing environmental preservation and economic development.
- Employees: 140
- Website: www.conservationfund.org

The Conservation Fund is a U.S. nonprofit organization with a dual charter to pursue environmental preservation and economic development. From 2008 to 2018, it has placed more than 500,000 acres under conservation management through a program whose goal is to purchase and permanently protect working forests. Since its founding in 1985, the organization has protected land and water in all 50 states, including parks, historic battlefields, and wild areas. The fund works with community and government leaders, businesses, landowners, conservation nonprofits and other partners to integrate economic and environmental objectives.

The Conservation Fund was founded in 1985 by Pat Noonan, former head of the Nature Conservancy. The current CEO is Larry Selzer. About 200 full-time staff work in the Fund's headquarters, located in Arlington, Virginia, and in offices in several states across the U.S. including California, Florida, Michigan, Minnesota, North Carolina, Pennsylvania, Oregon, Texas and Wyoming.

== Conservation strategy ==
The fund's services include land acquisition, conservation finance, small green business financing, community and economic development, environmental mitigation services, green infrastructure planning, and conservation training. The fund works primarily with partners who have identified conservation priorities and request assistance achieving their goals. Frequent partners include federal government agencies—such as the National Park Service, U.S. Fish and Wildlife Service, U.S. Forest Service, and Bureau of Land Management—and state agencies, such as departments of natural resources. Land trusts, corporations, foundations and other non-profit organizations are also common partners.

== Timeline: 1985–2015 ==
1985

- Patrick Noonan founds The Conservation Fund.

2001

- The Great Lakes Revolving Fund was created in 2001 with a $4 million grant from the Charles Stewart Mott Foundation.

2009

- The fund's Great Lakes Revolving Fund helped the Land Conservancy of West Michigan protect a critical stretch of shoreline that became part of the Saugatuck Dunes State Park on Lake Michigan—saving wetlands, dunelands and safe havens for migratory birds and other threatened species.

2011

- The Conservation Fund helped the National Park Service acquire a 95-acre property, historically known as the Harman Farm, which was the site of significant fighting during the first day of the Battle of Gettysburg.

2012

- After a nearly five-year process, the Fund conveys the final piece of Rocky Fork, the largest tract of unprotected land in the southern Appalachian Mountains, to the US Forest Service in September 2012. Tennessee named it the newest state park that year.

2013

- The Conservation Fund plays an instrumental role in the protection of key historic lands for the establishment of First State National Monument in Delaware and Harriet Tubman Underground Railroad National Monument in Maryland.
- The fund completes a decade-long effort to reunite and conserve a 30-mile forested property on California's North Coast with the purchase of Buckeye Forest.

2015

- The Conservation Fund partners with Apple.

== See also ==
Garcia River Forest (a forest in Northern California owned and managed by the Conservation Fund)
