= Conanicut Island Light =

- Conanicut Island Lighthouse
- U.S. National Register of Historic Places
- Conanicut Island Light in early twentieth century

- Location within Rhode Island Location within the United States
- Location: Jamestown, Rhode Island
- Coordinates: 41°34′24″N 71°22′21″W
- Built: 1886
- Architectural style: Late Gothic Revival
- MPS: Lighthouses of Rhode Island TR
- NRHP reference No.: 87001698
- Added to NRHP: February 25, 1988

Conanicut Island Light (also known as Conanicut Island Lighthouse), built in 1886, is an inactive lighthouse in Jamestown, Rhode Island.

The light was built primarily to assist the ferry between Jamestown and Newport, Rhode Island. The lighthouse lies on the northern tip of Conanicut Island in Jamestown. The light was deactivated in 1933 and its lantern was removed. In 1934 it was sold as government surplus and is now a private residence. The lighthouse is listed on the National Register of Historic Places. It was featured in Wes Anderson's 2012 film Moonrise Kingdom.

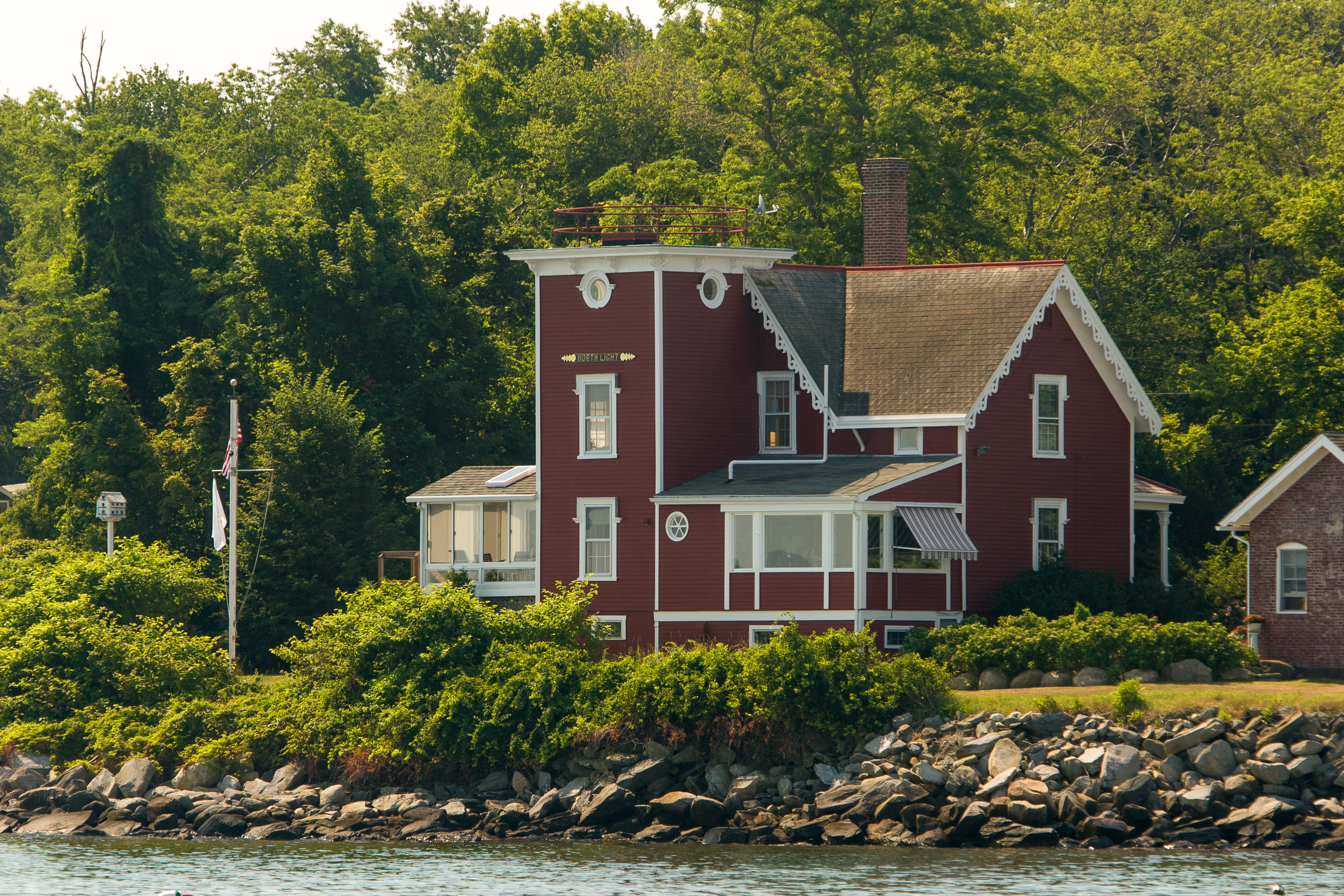
Conanicut Lighthouse

== See also ==
- National Register of Historic Places listings in Newport County, Rhode Island

== Notes ==
- Lighthouse pics and info
- America's Atlantic Coast Lighthouses, Kenneth Kochel, Betken Publications; 2nd ed., 1996. ISBN 0-9640765-2-7
- Northeast Lights: Lighthouses and Lightships, Rhode Island to Cape May, New Jersey, Robert Bachand, Sea Sports Publications. 1989. ISBN 0-9616399-3-8
- "Conanicut Lighthouse, RI," George Worthylake, The Keeper's Log, Winter 2004.
