= Lady Bird Johnson Environmental Award =

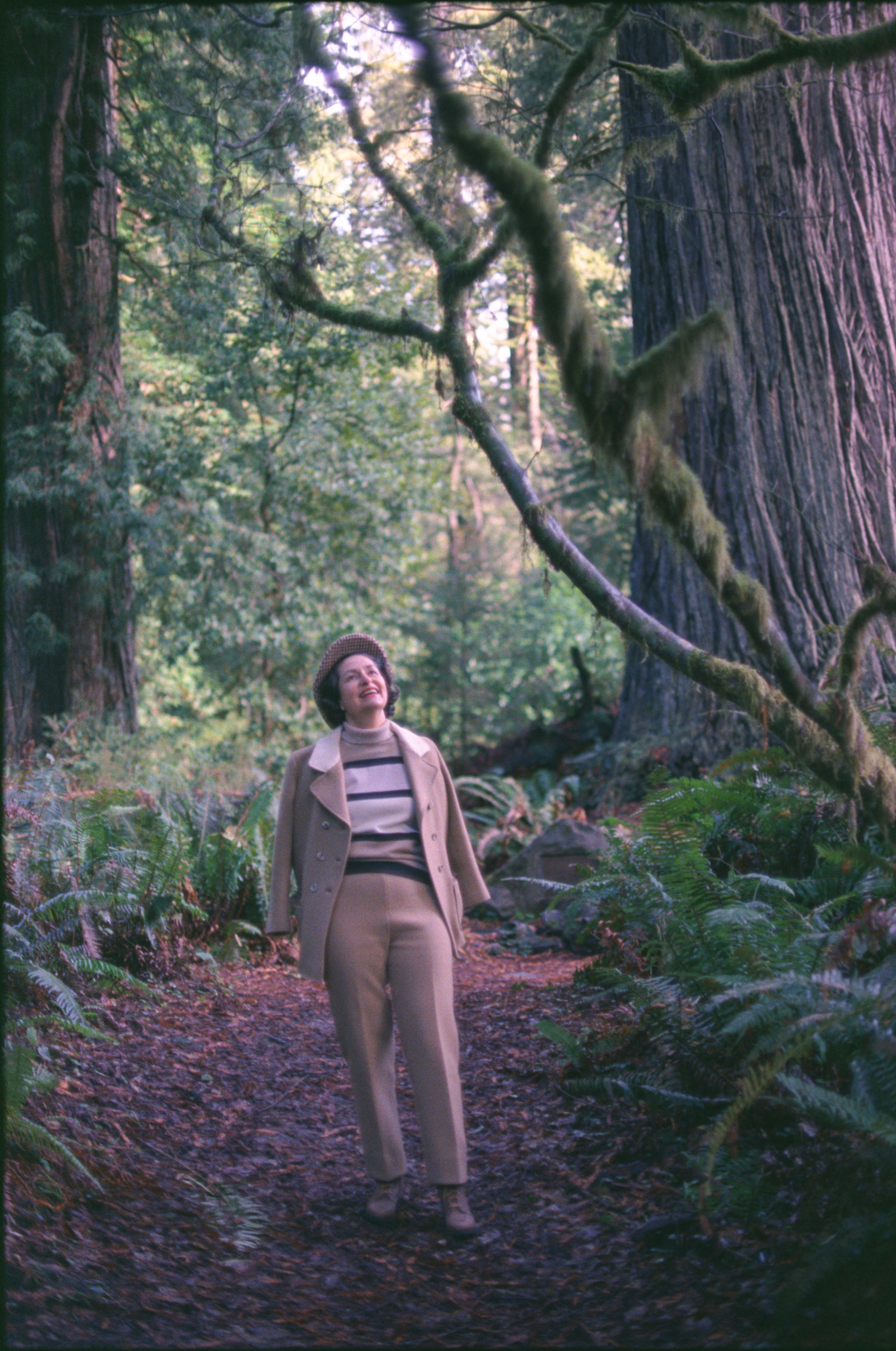
- Lady Bird Johnson toured the Giant Redwoods in Eureka, California in the fall of 1968
- Description: Exceptional achievement in the preservation and restoration of the natural world
- Country: United States
- Presented by: LBJ Foundation
- Reward: $25,000
- Website: http://www.lbjlibrary.org/page/foundation/initiatives/

The Lady Bird Johnson Environmental Award is awarded to a U.S. citizen, corporation or non-profit organization whose work demonstrates his or her dedication, passion for and commitment to the environment. The award is named for Lady Bird Johnson, former First Lady and wife of 36th President Lyndon Baines Johnson and was established in 1992 by the LBJ Foundation Board of Directors. It honors exceptional achievement in the preservation, restoration, or improvement of the natural world that embraces Johnson's style, energy, and commitment to her work. The Lady Bird Johnson Environmental Award is in the amount of $25,000.

The award was created by the Board of Trustees of The Lyndon Baines Johnson Foundation to honor the 80th birthday of the former First Lady to underscore her commitment to conservation and the environment and to increase public awareness of environmental issues. Recipients include Vice President Al Gore, U.S. Senator John Chafee, Governor Bruce Babbitt, Laurance Rockefeller, Patrick Noonan, Ted Turner, Ken Burns, and Michael Dombeck. Former Vice President Al Gore received the 2018 award in a ceremony at the Metropolitan Club in New York City, New York.

For purposes of the award, "environmentalism" is defined to include conservation, energy, climate change, sustainable agriculture, environmental justice, protection of natural resources, environmental health, land management, and other areas.

== See also ==
- List of environmental awards
