= John Bartlett (publisher) =

American writer and publisher (1820–1905)

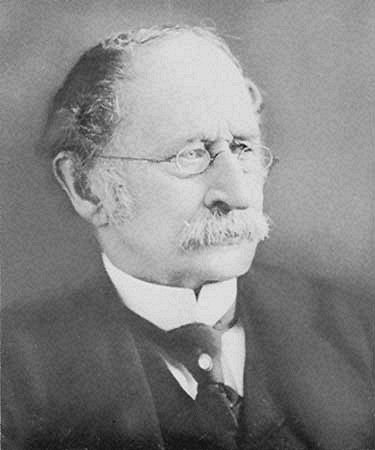
Bartlett, the first editor of Bartlett's Familiar Quotations

John Bartlett (June 14, 1820 – December 3, 1905) was an American writer and publisher and the editor of Bartlett's Familiar Quotations, which he revised continuously and published in several editions. Since Bartlett's death in 1905, the book has continued to be published in multiple editions, most recently in 2022.

== Early life and education ==
Bartlett was born in Plymouth, Massachusetts, to William Bartlett and Susan Thacher.

His father was a descendant of Mayflower Pilgrims, including Love Brewster, a founder of Bridgewater, Massachusetts, William Brewster, the Pilgrim colonist leader and spiritual elder of the Plymouth Colony, and John Alden, who was a cooper in Southampton, England, and who along with the Brewsters was a signer of the Mayflower Compact.

His mother was a direct descendant of Anthony and Elizabeth Thacher, who were the sole survivors of a shipwreck on August 14, 1635, in which 21 passengers, including their four children, drowned. Thacher Island, a small island off Cape Ann off the Massachusetts coast in the United States is named after them.

Bartlett was able to read by age three. By age nine, he read the entire Bible.

== Career ==
He finished school at age 16, and then moved to Cambridge, Massachusetts, where he worked for the University Bookstore that served Harvard University. By 29-years-old, he owned the store. Known for his memory for quotations and trivia, "Ask John Bartlett" became a byword in the community when someone was stumped.

=== Bartlett's Familiar Quotations ===
Bartlett began keeping a commonplace book of quotations to answer queries. In 1855, he privately printed the first edition of his Bartlett's Familiar Quotations, which was 258 pages long and included notable historical and current quotes from 169 people. One-third of the book was quotations from the Bible and the works of William Shakespeare, and most of the balance were quotes from the great English poets.

Bartlett sold the bookstore in 1862 to become a paymaster in the U.S. Navy during the Civil War. He served on the South Atlantic station, and returned to Boston in 1863, joining Little, Brown and Company, one of the nation's leading book publishers. That same year, Little, Brown issued the fourth edition of his quotation book. He rose to be the firm's senior partner in 1878 and retired in 1889. In addition to his work on quotations, overseeing nine editions of the book, he wrote on fishing and chess and compiled a massive concordance of Shakespeare, published in 1894, that is still the standard work of its kind.

The concordance, which Bartlett estimated consumed 16,000 hours of his time, was compiled with his wife Hannah, the daughter of Sidney Willard, a professor of Hebrew at Harvard University, and the granddaughter of Joseph Willard, president of Harvard.

== Honors ==
In 1971, Bartlett was awarded an honorary degree from Harvard University. In 1892, he was elected a Fellow of the American Academy of Arts and Sciences.

In 2022, the 19th edition of his Familiar Quotations was published by Little, Brown and Company.

== Death ==
Bartlett died in Cambridge, Massachusetts at age 85.
