= Yulene Olaizola =

Yulene Olaizola (born June 13, 1983, Mexico City) is a Mexican director, editor and producer. She graduated from the Centro de Capacitación Cinematográfica (CCC). She won several awards for her debut film, Intimacies of Shakespeare and Victor Hugo. She was selected to participate in "L’atelier" of the Cinéfondation, designed to help filmmakers get in touch with producers, obtain international funding, and be part of the Cannes Film Festival.

== Professional career ==
She graduated summa cum laude for her documentary thesis "Intimacies of Shakespeare and Victor Hugo" (Intimidades de Shakespeare y Víctor Hugo).

Her film Fogo is the result of work done during an artistic residency sponsored by the Fogo Island Arts Corporation in Newfoundland, Canada. It was part of the Official Selection of the 10th Morelia International Film Festival (FICM) and the 44th Directors' Fortnight, a parallel section of the 65th Cannes Film Festival.

She founded her production company, Malacosa Cine, with Rubén Imaz.

She was a member of the advisory board of Procine in 2018.

She participated in the 71st Cannes Film Festival with her film Tragic Jungle, supported by “L’atelier" of the Cinefondation.

== Filmography ==
- Intimidades de Shakespeare y Víctor Hugo (2008)
- Paraísos artificiales (2011)
- Fogo (2012)
- Epitaph (2015) codirección con Rubén Imaz
- Tragic Jungle (2020)
