= Epitaph (2015 film) =

2015 film

- Film poster
- Directed by: Rubén Imaz; Yulene Olaizola
- Written by: Rubén Imaz; Yulene Olaizola
- Starring: Xabier Coronado
- Release date: 22 November 2015 (BNFF)
- Running time: 82 minutes
- Country: Mexico
- Language: Spanish

Epitaph (Spanish: Epitafio) is a 2015 Mexican adventure historical drama film directed by Rubén Imaz and Yulene Olaizola. The film was named on the shortlist for Mexico's entry for the Academy Award for Best Foreign Language Film at the 89th Academy Awards.

== Cast ==
- Xabier Coronado as Diego de Ordaz
- Martín Román as Gonzalo de Monovar
- Carlos Triviño as Pedrito
