= Patrick Noonan =

American conservationist

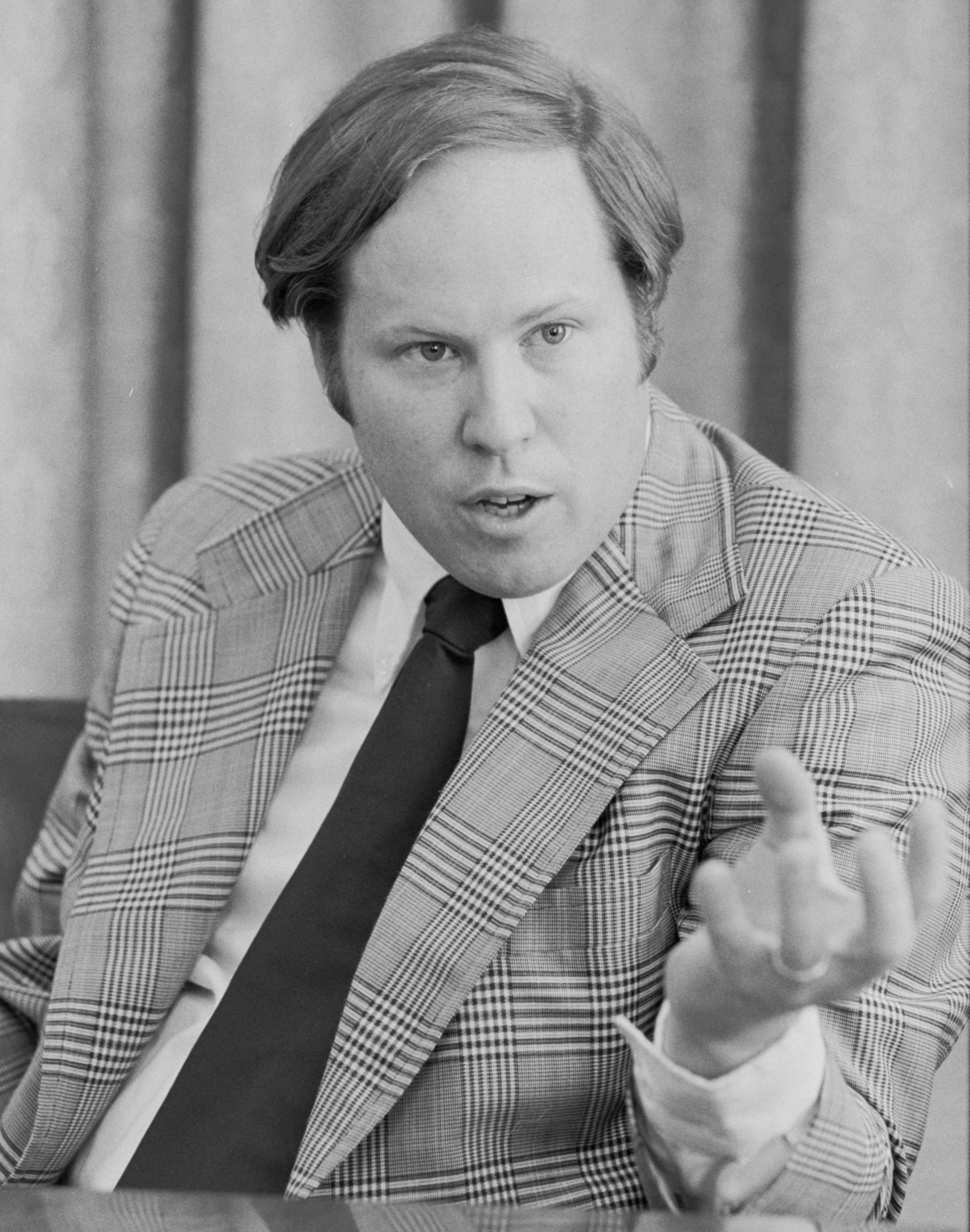
- Noonan in 1977
- Born: 1943 (age 82–83); Maryland
- Education: Gettysburg College
- Occupation: Conservationist

Patrick F. Noonan (born 1943) is an American conservationist and was president of The Nature Conservancy from 1973 to 1980, and the Conservation Fund. He was a recipient of the Lady Bird Johnson Environmental Award.

He graduated from Gettysburg College with BS Business Administration, (1965), from American University with an MBA, and from Catholic University of America, with a MS in City and Regional Planning.

He has served on three Presidential Commissions: the Commission on Americans Outdoors; Commission on Environmental Quality; and the Commission on White House Fellows. He currently serves on the board of trustees of the National Geographic Society and is Vice Chairman of the Society's Education Foundation. He is also on the board of advisors of the Nicholas Institute for Environmental Policy Solutions and was previously a board member of the Chesapeake Conservancy.

His daughter, Karen Elizabeth Noonan (1967–1988) was one of the victims of the terrorist bombing of Pan Am Flight 103 over Lockerbie, Scotland.

Noonan is quoted in the profile prepared by the American Academy for Park and Recreation Administration when he received its Pugsley Medal in 2005: "Noonan's early childhood was spent with weekends in the great outdoors on rural lands owned by his family in Maryland. He developed there a deep and abiding love for nature and respect for its beauty. Later he noted, 'I had the privilege of transferring the land to the Maryland Parks and Planning Commission to create Little Bennett Regional Park. It was the most satisfying moment of my life, realizing that for all time generations would come to walk the land and experience firsthand the daily miracles of nature.'"

== Awards ==
- 1985 MacArthur Fellows Program
- 2005 Pugsley Medal
- 2009 George Bird Grinnell Memorial Award
