= Chesapeake Conservancy =

Nonprofit organization in Maryland, U.S.

- Chesapeake Conservancy Inc.
- Type: Nonprofit
- Tax ID no.: 26-2271377
- Legal status: 501(c)(3)
- Headquarters: Annapolis, Maryland
- Board Chair: Randall W. Larrimore
- President & CEO: Joel Dunn
- Website: https://www.chesapeakeconservancy.org

Chesapeake Conservancy is a non-profit organisation, whose aim is to use technology and advocacy to support conservation of the Chesapeake Bay estuary on the east coast of the United States. The group is based in Annapolis, Maryland.

== History ==
In December 2016, the organisation announced that Robert Stanton, former director of the National Park Service, and Anne Scott, a philanthropic investment manager, had joined the board of directors, replacing outgoing board members Patrick Noonan, Stephen Adkins and Lloyd Beatty, Jr.

=== Board of directors ===
The current board of directors of the conservancy includes:

- President and CEO: Joel E. Dunn
- Chair: Randall W. Larrimore
- Vice Chair: Mark Belton
- Treasurer: Leslie Delgran
- Secretary: Marc Guenter Bunting
- Maite Arce
- Thad Bench
- Michael Brubaker
- Matthew Earl
- Colin Harrington
- Verna Harrison
- Jeffery More
- Stephanie Meeks
- John G. Neely
- Dr. Mamie A. Parker
- John J. Reynolds
- Chief G. Anne Richardson, Rappahannock Tribe
- Jeff Sabot
- Nancy B. Walters, PhD
- Molly Joseph Ward
- Beattra Wilson

Honorary Board Members

- Gilbert Melville Grosvenor
- U.S. Senator John Warner

Emeritus Directors

- Patrick Noonan
- Charles A. Stek

== Projects ==
=== High-Resolution Land Cover ===
Chesapeake Conservancy used topographical mapping to create the Chesapeake Bay High-Resolution Land Cover Project, a high-resolution map of natural and man-made objects spanning the bay's 64,000 square mile watershed. Initially a small-scale pilot program, using mapping to update the United States Geological Survey's existing land-change model of the bay, the Conservancy subsequently formed a partnership with the University of Vermont and WorldView Solutions to extrapolate the method to the whole bay. The map has square meter resolution, substantially improving the previous 30-square-meter resolution data. The data was then converted into a web-based application for public use, released in late 2016, allowing those involved in conservation of the bay to locate optimal locations for tree buffers and other measures aimed at reducing soil and nutrient pollution in the bay's watershed. The Conservancy refers to this method as "precision conservation". The Chesapeake Bay Program then combined the mapping data with land use data from the area to inform other conservation measures and attempts to improve land use, as well as monitoring water pollution. Chesapeake Conservancy also developed other applications to combine with different kinds of data, such as municipal stormwater reports. In 2014, the Conservancy received a grant from Microsoft, as well as access to their Azure cloud computing service, which drastically increased the speed of the web-based application. A deep neural network model developed by Chesapeake Conservancy and Microsoft allowed the data used in creating the map to be updated at more frequent intervals, which will allow researchers to track changes such as deforestation, urbanization, and the impact of climate change.

In 2018, Chesapeake Conservancy was awarded $1.1 million from the Environmental Protection Agency to support its land cover project and to expand a pilot program that maps how water moves across the landscape. The land cover project uses aerial images and computer programming to identify natural and man-made objects across the watershed. Updating the previous 2013/14 land cover dataset to more recent years, aids states, counties and local jurisdictions to see how development shapes the watershed over time. To map how water moves across the land, the Conservancy uses existing United States Geological Survey lidar data, which is collected by a plane bouncing a laser to the ground to collect the height of objects. Combining this information with the updated land cover map will help to precisely locate areas where restoration projects will be the most efficient.

=== Return of Native American land ===
In 2017, the conservancy worked with former Virginia Senator John Warner to return an area of land adjacent to the Rappahannock River to the Rappahannock Native Americans who had been forcibly moved from the area in the 17th century.

== Champions of the Chesapeake ==
Each year, the organization gives out Champions of the Chesapeake awards to recognize individuals for their contribution to conservation of the bay, its environment, and its resources. In 2017 the award was given to Maryland Governor Larry Hogan. In 2018 the award was given to Ecosystem Investment Partners, The Conservation Fund, and The Department of Defense's Readiness and Environmental Protection Integration (REPI) program.
