= Emmeline Moore =

American biologist

- Born: Emmeline Moore; April 29, 1872; Batavia, New York, U.S.
- Died: September 12, 1963 (aged 91); Guilderland, New York, U.S.
- Education: Cornell University(BA, PhD); Wellesley College(MA)
- Scientific career
- Fields: Biology; Fisheries

Emmeline Moore (April 29, 1872–September 12, 1963) was an American biologist known for her various articles on fish diseases, as well as pioneering work in conservation and combating water pollution. She earned a PhD in biology from Cornell University in 1916. Moore supervised and edited fourteen watershed reports conducted in New York between 1926 and 1939 and these were the most comprehensive scientific surveys of any states' water resources. She died at a nursing home in Guilderland, New York, at the age of 91 following an extended illness.

== Early life and education ==
Emmeline Moore was born in Batavia, New York, in 1872 and grew up on a farm there. In 1895, she graduated from Geneseo Normal School (now SUNY Geneseo), and, like many women born in the 1870s she taught at the normal schools.

She then enrolled at Cornell University, earning a BA in 1905, followed by an MA at Wellesley College in 1906. After acquiring her masters she taught biology in normal schools for four years and then accepted a position of substitute professor of botany at Huguenot College in South Africa for a year in 1911.

Moore then returned to the United States. This was followed by further study at Cornell, where she received her PhD in 1916 in biology. From 1914 to 1919, Moore taught biology at Vassar College, eventually rising to the level of assistant professor. She also worked at the Bureau of Fisheries during summers which piqued her interest in research work.

== Career ==
Moore was the first woman to work as a research biologist in the New York State Conservation Department, as of 1920. She became chief aquatic biologist and director of the New York State Biological Survey in 1932, where she produced some of the best early state surveys of aquatic resources. She studied rivers, lake pollution, and fish diseases while working with New York Conservation Department for the next 24 years. She and her staff assessed watersheds as systems, conducting synoptic surveys of biota and assessing the chemistry, hydrology, and presence of pollutants in waterways. Through the surveys voucher specimens were collected, and a generation of biologists were trained in fisheries science and management.

Moore's research was extensive and accorded her with significant attention. She was the first woman to be elected as President of the American Fisheries Society, serving 1927-1928. She also published technical papers on fish culture and fish diseases. After her retirement she continued research at Laboratory of Oceanography at Yale University for a few years.

=== Awards ===
Emmeline Moore has been honored twice with the Walker Prize from the Boston Society of Natural History. She was also awarded an honorary degree from Hobart College in 1939. In her late eighties, she christened a New York oceanographic research ship named in her honor.

== Emmeline Moore prize ==
The American Fisheries Society established the Emmeline Moore Prize as a prestigious career achievement in order to recognize AFS members who display a strong commitment to promoting diversity in fisheries and to those who encourage greater involvement of underrepresented groups in fisheries science, education, research, or management. Previous recipients include:

- Gwen White
- Mamie Parker, 2016
- Hannibal Bolton, 2017
- Julie Claussen, 2018
- Kenneth Beal, 2019
