= Louella D. Everett =

American anthologist and editor

Louella D. Everett (17 October 1883–September 1967) was a poetry anthologist and associate editor of the 11th and 12th editions of Bartlett's Familiar Quotations (with Christopher Morley). Morley described Everett as having done "the most laborious part of the work" for both editions. The 11th edition was the first to divide pages into two columns of quotes and was marked by a notable increase in the number of women quoted: 303 were women out of a total of 2280 quoted (13.2%), compared to 92 of 1058 (8.6%) in the 10th edition.

Everett started her collection and organization of verses as a teenager, eventually gathering more than "a hundred thousand poetic items [...] filed and cross-indexed alphabetically." Between 1918 and 1960, she was a contributor to the New York Times Book Review, working in the "Queries and Answers" department to help readers find the sources of bits of verse. She was considered a "super sleuth of poetry fragments" who "was especially knowledgeable in popular light verse." At one time, her fame was such that she was the topic of a short piece in The New Yorker's The Talk of the Town. She also answered queries sent directly to her home address in her spare time. She said her entrance into the quotation business was "rather an accident", explaining, "One Sunday I read a reply to a question in a New York paper that was entirely wrong. I sent in the correct reply, and this was followed by other queries which I answered." Everett said she normally devoted herself to quotation queries at night, until 2 a.m. "I can do this work because I need only five hours of sleep every night" she said.

She was born in Middletown, New York and moved to Boston when she was 16. She married Charles H. Young in Philadelphia in 1907. They divorced in Boston before 1930 and she did not use her married name in her editing work. In addition to her quotation-finding work, Everett worked full-time as a public stenographer who typed medical papers. Furthermore, she published two poetry anthologies: The Cat in Verse (with Carolyn Wells) and Home and Holiday Verse. A reporter for the Miami Herald reported on his visit to Everett's office, and described her as someone who "looks you straight in the eye and if you want to ask questions she tells you to fire away."

Louella D. Everett of Boston, Mass.,

Must be an industrious, painstaking lass;
I'm sure she refuses the diners and dancers

To devote all her time to Queries and Answers

— Carolyn Wells, Queries and Answers column

Everett died in Boston, Massachusetts in 1967.
