= Marstel-Day =

Marstel-Day, LLC
- Type: Privately held Membership
- Industry: Environmental Planning and Management Services
- Founded: 2002
- Headquarters: Fredericksburg, Virginia, USA
- Key people: Dan Choike, CEO Jason Winner, CSO Sean Donahoe, Board Chairman
- Number of employees: 79
- Website: www.marstel-day.com (US)

Marstel-Day, LLC is a natural resource and environmental consulting firm that provides management, planning, and analytical services. Headquartered in Fredericksburg, VA, Marstel-Day operates in locations nationwide. The firm has an 80-member, multidisciplinary team of scientists, policy strategists, planners, natural and cultural resource experts, analysts, engineers, and geographic information system (GIS) specialists. Marstel-Day LLC is led by Daniel J. Choike, CEO.

== History and Leadership ==
A U.S. Government Accountability Office (GAO) report, Military Base Closures, noted that the DOD used conservation conveyance in the largest single transfer of surplus property that the U.S. Army has undertaken, conveying almost 58,000 acres from the Sierra Army Depot in California to qualified not-for-profit groups for natural resource and conservation purposes.

The White House named Rubin a Champion of Change for Community Resilience in 2013. She currently leads a regional initiative on climate, environment, and readiness in Virginia, and Gov. Terry McAuliffe named Rubin to the State Air Pollution Control Board. In addition to Rubin, the Marstel-Day leadership team includes H. Lee Halterman, partner, and general counsel; James P. "Phil" Huber, partner; Sean B. Donohoe, Ph.D., partner; and Jennifer Graham, partner, and Air Force program manager. Halterman, who served as policy director of the U.S. House Armed Services Committee, also known as the United States House Committee on Armed Services, and general counsel to U.S. Rep. Ron Dellums, co-authored Lying Down with the Lions: A Public Life from the Streets of Oakland to the Halls of Power (2000) and Defense Sense: The Search for a Rational Military Policy (1983).

== Services ==
Marstel-Day provides environmental and conservation policy and planning services; it also develops and executes implementation strategies. Its clients predominantly include military and civilian agencies, businesses, local governments, and nonprofit conservators.

== Vital Voices of the Environment ==
The Environmental Business Journal gave Marstel-Day a project merit award for launching the Vital Voices of the Environment series featuring former Marstel-Day President and CEO Rebecca R. Rubin's interviews with environmental thinkers and planners on key environmental and conservation issues. The Vital Voices collection includes Rubin's discussion with extreme snowboarder Jeremy Jones about the dire future of winter playgrounds due to climate change. All-star drummer Rich Redmond tells Rubin in an interview about his eco-friendly drum set made of bamboo and how the music industry can practice sustainability.

In John Englander's discussion with Rubin, the oceanographer explains the certainty of 50 feet of sea level rise. During her Vital Voices interview, Earth Day Network President Kathleen Rogers talks about how individuals make a difference for the planet.

== Wildlife Conservation Awareness Campaign ==
Former CEO and President Rebecca R. Rubin created Marstel-Day's 2015 Wildlife Conservation Awareness Campaign to highlight issues and celebrate ways that individuals and organizations can make a difference. The campaign's speaker series featured conservationists highlighting the illegal wildlife trade, applauding ways to reconnect children to nature, and hailing the smartphone's ability to help people interact with public lands. Other speakers have spotlighted the havoc that plastic pollution wreaks on oceans and the challenges that environmental journalism faces.

== Internal Green Business Practices ==
The company established an internal Green Vision Council that works to decrease Marstel-Day's carbon footprint, increase company sustainability, and promote an ethic of environmental awareness. Run by employees serving for six-month terms, the council has greened the company's supply chain by buying from sustainable sources and buying green products. The company has offset its carbon dioxide emissions since it joined Carbonfund.org, one of the nation's leading nonprofit carbon offset organizations, in 2010. Marstel-Day has offset carbon emissions attributed to employee business travel by air and personal vehicle and the carbon footprint of the company's U.S. offices. The offsets occur through payments to support renewable energy, energy efficiency, or reforestation projects, or to buy carbon reductions that are then retired.

Marstel-Day became the nation's first company to achieve certification as a sustainable service provider under the National Standards Foundation (NSF) International P391 program. The certification requires the demonstration of sustainable achievement in the categories of environment, labor, and social responsibility across a framework of more than 100 criteria. At NSF's request, Marstel-Day helped test-pilot the protocol even before P391 standards were officially introduced as North America's first protocol to define sustainable services within the service industry. Later, NSF used Marstel-Day's experience to create a case study to guide other service providers seeking to understand the value of sustainability certification. Marstel-Day has published its Corporate Social Responsibility Report and its Climate Change Adaptation Plan to outline everything from the company's land conservation and water demand forecasting to its Earth Day commitment.

== Awards ==
- August 2015: Inc. magazine named Marstel-Day one of the 5,000 fastest-growing, privately held U.S. companies for the seventh consecutive year (2009, 2010, 2011, 2012, 2013, 2014, 2015).
- May 2015: The Virginia Chamber of Commerce named Marstel-Day to its annual Fantastic 50, which recognizes the fastest-growing, privately held companies based in Virginia for their four-year revenue history (2008, 2014, 2015).
- April 2015: The nonprofit Alliance for Workplace Excellence (AWE) has recognized Marstel-Day with an EcoLeadership Award for four consecutive years (2012, 2013, 2014, 2015). The 2015 award highlighted Marstel-Day's sustainability-focused community outreach efforts and its internal sustainability accomplishments.
- March 2015: The Virginia Department of Environmental Quality named Marstel-Day a 2015 Sustainability Partner, recognizing the company for the second consecutive year as having a culture of environmental sustainability and community involvement. (2014, 2015).
- July 2014: The Zweig Group named Marstel-Day to its 2014 Hot Firm List of the fastest-growing architecture, engineering, planning, and environmental consulting firms in the United States and Canada for the sixth consecutive year, listing Marstel-Day at #56 for 2014 (2009, 2010, 2011, 2012, 2013, 2014).
- May 2014: The Virginia Department of Environmental Quality gave Marstel-Day a Bronze Medal as part of the Governor's Environmental Excellence Award program, recognizing the company for its multiyear effort to help NSF International and the federal government create the first sustainability certification tool applicable to all businesses in the service industry.
- January 2014: The Environmental Business Journal gave Marstel-Day a gold medal for Business Growth and a "New Practice Area" award, recognizing the company for accomplishments in 2013, notably its nearly 40 percent revenue growth, the addition of three offices and multiple new clients, and its support of the Air Force in developing policy for and implementing a new authority allowing installations to partner with surrounding communities to share services, cut costs, and reduce resource consumption.
- September 2010: The University of Virginia Darden School of Business gave Marstel-Day the Chairman's Award in the Tayloe Murphy Resilience Award Competition, recognizing the company's commitment to environmental practices.
