= List of accolades received by Whiplash =

Whiplash accolades
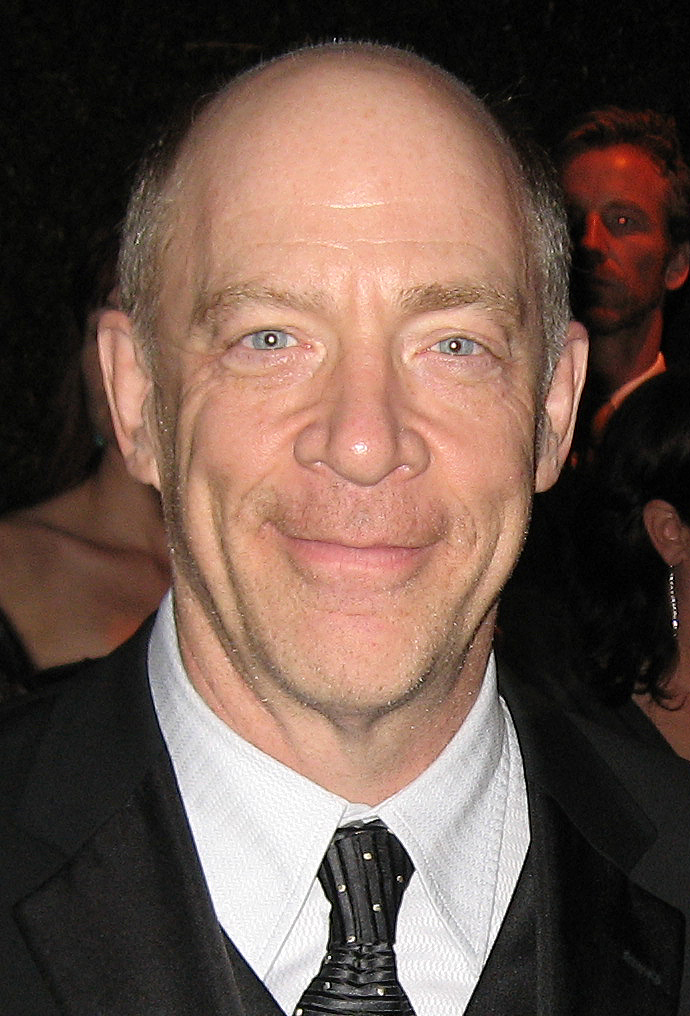
- J. K. Simmons received many awards and nominations for his performance in the film including the Academy Award for Best Supporting Actor.
Accolades
Award	Won	Nominated
AACTA Awards	1	4
Academy Awards	3	5
African-American Film Critics Association	1	1
Alliance of Women Film Journalists	1	2
American Cinema Editors	0	1
American Film Institute	1	1
Austin Film Critics Association	1	1
Belgian Film Critics Association	0	1
Bodil Awards	0	1
Boston Society of Film Critics	1	1
British Academy Film Awards	3	5
Calgary International Film Festival	1	1
Camerimage	0	1
Cannes Film Festival	0	1
Casting Society of America	0	1
Chicago Film Critics Association	3	5
Critics' Choice Movie Awards	1	4
Dallas–Fort Worth Film Critics Association	1	1
Deauville American Film Festival	2	2
Detroit Film Critics Society	2	5
Film Independent Spirit Awards	2	4
Florida Film Critics Circle	2	2
Golden Globe Awards	1	1
Gotham Awards	0	1
Grammy Awards	0	1
Houston Film Critics Society	1	4
London Film Critics Circle	1	4
Los Angeles Film Critics Association	1	1
Mill Valley Film Festival	1	1
Motion Picture Sound Editors	0	2
MTV Movie Awards	0	5
New York Film Critics Circle	1	1
New York Film Critics Online	1	1
Nikkan Sports Film Award	1	1
Online Film Critics Society	0	4
Palm Springs International Film Festival	1	1
Producers Guild of America Awards	0	1
San Diego Film Critics Society	0	1
San Francisco Film Critics Circle	0	4
Santa Barbara International Film Festival	1	1
Satellite Awards	2	5
Saturn Awards	1	3
Screen Actors Guild Awards	1	1
St. Louis Film Critics Association	2	5
Sundance Film Festival	2	2
Tallinn Black Nights Film Festival	0	1
Toronto Film Critics Association	1	1
Valladolid International Film Festival	1	2
Village Voice Film Poll	1	2
Washington D.C. Area Film Critics Association	1	5
Writers Guild of America Awards	0	1
- Totals
Totals	49	114
- References

Whiplash is a 2014 American drama film directed by Damien Chazelle. The screenplay, also written by Chazelle, was partly based on his experiences in the Princeton High School Studio Band. The film stars Miles Teller as an ambitious jazz drummer selected to join a school studio band taught by a cruel music instructor played by J. K. Simmons. Paul Reiser, Melissa Benoist, and Austin Stowell feature in supporting roles.

The film premiered at the opening night of the 2014 Sundance Film Festival on January 16, 2014, where it went on to win the Grand Jury Prize and Audience Award for Dramatic Feature. Sony Picture Classics provided a limited release in United States and Canada on October 10, 2014. The film grossed more than $48 million at the worldwide box office on a production budget of $3.3 million. Rotten Tomatoes, a review aggregator, surveyed 290 reviews and judged 93% to be positive.

Whiplash garnered awards and nominations in a variety of categories with particular praise for Chazelle's screenplay and direction, Teller and Simmons' performance, and Tom Cross' editing. At the 87th Academy Awards, the film received five nominations with Simmons winning for Best Supporting Actor, Cross for Best Film Editing, and the Academy Award for Best Sound Mixing. Whiplash garnered five nominations at the British Academy Film Awards with Simmons winning for Best Supporting Actor, Cross for Best Editing, and the BAFTA Award for Best Sound. Simmons also received awards in the "Best Supporting Actor" category at the 72nd Golden Globe Awards, 21st Screen Actors Guild Awards, and the 20th Critics' Choice Awards. The American Film Institute included the film in their list of top ten films of the year.

== Accolades ==
Award	Date of ceremony	Category	Recipient(s)	Result	Ref.
AACTA Awards	January 31, 2015	Best International Film	Whiplash	Nominated	
AACTA Awards	January 31, 2015	Best International Direction	Damien Chazelle	Nominated	
AACTA Awards	January 31, 2015	Best International Screenplay	Damien Chazelle	Nominated	
AACTA Awards	January 31, 2015	Best International Supporting Actor	J. K. Simmons	Won	
Academy Awards	February 22, 2015	Best Picture	Whiplash	Nominated	
Academy Awards	February 22, 2015	Best Supporting Actor	J. K. Simmons	Won	
Academy Awards	February 22, 2015	Best Adapted Screenplay	Damien Chazelle	Nominated	
Academy Awards	February 22, 2015	Best Film Editing	Tom Cross	Won	
Academy Awards	February 22, 2015	Best Sound Mixing	Craig Mann, Ben Wilkins, and Thomas Curley	Won	
African-American Film Critics Association	December 8, 2014	Best Supporting Actor	J. K. Simmons (Tied with Tyler Perry for Gone Girl)	Won	
Alliance of Women Film Journalists	January 12, 2015	Best Supporting Actor	J. K. Simmons	Won	
Alliance of Women Film Journalists	January 12, 2015	Best Editing	Tom Cross	Nominated	
American Cinema Editors	January 30, 2015	Best Edited Feature Film – Dramatic	Tom Cross	Nominated	
American Film Institute	December 9, 2014	Top Ten Movies of the Year	Whiplash	Won	
Austin Film Critics Association	December 17, 2014	Best Supporting Actor	J. K. Simmons	Won	
Belgian Film Critics Association	January 9, 2016	Grand Prix	Whiplash	Nominated	
Bodil Awards	March 5, 2016	Best US Film	Whiplash	Nominated	
Boston Society of Film Critics	December 7, 2014	Best Supporting Actor	J. K. Simmons	Won	
British Academy Film Awards	February 8, 2015	Best Direction	Damien Chazelle	Nominated	
British Academy Film Awards	February 8, 2015	Best Original Screenplay	Damien Chazelle	Nominated	
British Academy Film Awards	February 8, 2015	Best Actor in a Supporting Role	J. K. Simmons	Won	
British Academy Film Awards	February 8, 2015	Best Editing	Tom Cross	Won	
British Academy Film Awards	February 8, 2015	Best Sound	Craig Mann; Ben Wilkins; Thomas Curley	Won	
Calgary International Film Festival	October 1, 2014	Audience Choice Narrative Award	Damien Chazelle	Won	
Camerimage	November 22, 2014	Best Directorial Debut	Damien Chazelle	Nominated	
Cannes Film Festival	May 24, 2014	Queer Palm	Damien Chazelle	Nominated	
Casting Society of America	January 22, 2015	Feature Film Studio or Independent Drama	Terri Taylor	Nominated	
Chicago Film Critics Association	December 15, 2014	Best Picture	Whiplash	Nominated	
Chicago Film Critics Association	December 15, 2014	Best Supporting Actor	J. K. Simmons	Won	
Chicago Film Critics Association	December 15, 2014	Best Editing	Tom Cross	Won	
Chicago Film Critics Association	December 15, 2014	Best Original Screenplay	Damien Chazelle	Nominated	
Chicago Film Critics Association	December 15, 2014	Most Promising Filmmaker	Damien Chazelle	Won	
Critics' Choice Movie Awards	January 15, 2015	Best Picture	Whiplash	Nominated	
Critics' Choice Movie Awards	January 15, 2015	Best Supporting Actor	J. K. Simmons	Won	
Critics' Choice Movie Awards	January 15, 2015	Best Original Screenplay	Damien Chazelle	Nominated	
Critics' Choice Movie Awards	January 15, 2015	Best Editing	Tom Cross	Nominated	
Dallas–Fort Worth Film Critics Association	December 15, 2014	Best Supporting Actor	J. K. Simmons	Won	
Deauville American Film Festival	September 13, 2014	Audience Award	Whiplash	Won	
Deauville American Film Festival	September 13, 2014	Grand Special Prize	Whiplash	Won	
Detroit Film Critics Society	December 15, 2014	Best Film	Whiplash	Nominated	
Detroit Film Critics Society	December 15, 2014	Best Director	Damien Chazelle	Nominated	
Detroit Film Critics Society	December 15, 2014	Best Supporting Actor	J. K. Simmons	Won	
Detroit Film Critics Society	December 15, 2014	Best Screenplay	Damien Chazelle	Nominated	
Detroit Film Critics Society	December 15, 2014	Breakthrough Artist	Damien Chazelle	Won	
Film Independent Spirit Awards	February 21, 2015	Best Film	Whiplash	Nominated	
Film Independent Spirit Awards	February 21, 2015	Best Director	Damien Chazelle	Nominated	
Film Independent Spirit Awards	February 21, 2015	Best Supporting Male	J. K. Simmons	Won	
Film Independent Spirit Awards	February 21, 2015	Best Editing	Tom Cross	Won	
Florida Film Critics Circle	December 19, 2014	Best Supporting Actor	J. K. Simmons	Won	
Florida Film Critics Circle	December 19, 2014	Pauline Kael Breakout Award	Damien Chazelle	Won	
Golden Globe Awards	January 11, 2015	Best Supporting Actor – Motion Picture	J. K. Simmons	Won	
Gotham Awards	December 1, 2014	Best Actor	Miles Teller	Nominated	
Grammy Awards	February 15, 2016	Best Score Soundtrack for Visual Media	Justin Hurwitz	Nominated	
Houston Film Critics Society	January 10, 2015	Best Picture	Whiplash	Nominated	
Houston Film Critics Society	January 10, 2015	Best Director	Damien Chazelle	Nominated	
Houston Film Critics Society	January 10, 2015	Best Supporting Actor	J. K. Simmons	Won	
Houston Film Critics Society	January 10, 2015	Best Screenplay	Damien Chazelle	Nominated	
London Film Critics Circle	January 18, 2015	Film of the Year	Whiplash	Nominated	
London Film Critics Circle	January 18, 2015	Screenwriter of the Year	Damien Chazelle	Nominated	
London Film Critics Circle	January 18, 2015	Supporting Actor of the Year	J. K. Simmons	Won	
London Film Critics Circle	January 18, 2015	Technical Achievement	Tom Cross	Nominated	
Los Angeles Film Critics Association	December 7, 2014	Best Supporting Actor	J. K. Simmons	Won	
Mill Valley Film Festival	October 12, 2014	Audience Award (Best U.S. Feature Film)	Damien Chazelle	Won	
Motion Picture Sound Editors	February 15, 2015	Feature English Language – Dialogue/ADR	Craig Mann; Ben Wilkins; Joe Schiff; Lauren Hadaway	Nominated	
Motion Picture Sound Editors	February 15, 2015	Feature Musical	Craig Mann; Ben Wilkins; Richard Henderson	Nominated	
MTV Movie Awards	April 12, 2015	Movie of the Year	Damien Chazelle	Nominated	
MTV Movie Awards	April 12, 2015	Best Male Performance	Miles Teller	Nominated	
MTV Movie Awards	April 12, 2015	Best Musical Moment	Miles Teller	Nominated	
MTV Movie Awards	April 12, 2015	Best WTF Moment	Miles Teller	Nominated	
MTV Movie Awards	April 12, 2015	Best Villain	J. K. Simmons	Nominated	
New York Film Critics Circle	December 1, 2014	Best Supporting Actor	J. K. Simmons	Won	
New York Film Critics Online	December 7, 2014	Best Supporting Actor	J. K. Simmons	Won	
Nikkan Sports Film Award	December 28, 2015	Best Foreign Film	Whiplash	Won	
Online Film Critics Society	December 15, 2014	Best Picture	Whiplash	Nominated	
Online Film Critics Society	December 15, 2014	Best Supporting Actor	J. K. Simmons	Nominated	
Online Film Critics Society	December 15, 2014	Best Original Screenplay	Damien Chazelle	Nominated	
Online Film Critics Society	December 15, 2014	Best Editing	Tom Cross	Nominated	
Palm Springs International Film Festival	January 3, 2015	Spotlight Award	J. K. Simmons	Won	
Producers Guild of America Awards	January 24, 2015	Best Theatrical Motion Picture	Jason Blum; David Lancaster; Helen Estabrook	Nominated	
San Diego Film Critics Society	December 15, 2014	Best Supporting Actor	J. K. Simmons	Nominated	
San Francisco Film Critics Circle	December 14, 2014	Best Picture	Whiplash	Nominated	
San Francisco Film Critics Circle	December 14, 2014	Best Supporting Actor	J. K. Simmons	Nominated	
San Francisco Film Critics Circle	December 14, 2014	Best Original Screenplay	Damien Chazelle	Nominated	
San Francisco Film Critics Circle	December 14, 2014	Best Editing	Tom Cross	Nominated	
Santa Barbara International Film Festival	February 1, 2015	Virtuoso Award	J. K. Simmons	Won	
Satellite Awards	February 16, 2015	Best Film	Whiplash	Nominated	
Satellite Awards	February 16, 2015	Best Director	Damien Chazelle	Nominated	
Satellite Awards	February 16, 2015	Best Actor – Motion Picture	Miles Teller	Nominated	
Satellite Awards	February 16, 2015	Best Supporting Actor – Motion Picture	J. K. Simmons	Won	
Satellite Awards	February 16, 2015	Best Sound (Editing and Mixing)	Craig Mann; Ben Wilkins; Thomas Curley	Won	
Saturn Awards	June 25, 2015	Best Independent Film	Whiplash	Won	
Saturn Awards	June 25, 2015	Best Supporting Actor	J. K. Simmons	Nominated	
Saturn Awards	June 25, 2015	Best Writing	Damien Chazelle	Nominated	
Screen Actors Guild Awards	January 25, 2015	Outstanding Performance by a Male Actor in a Supporting Role	J. K. Simmons	Won	
St. Louis Film Critics Association	December 15, 2014	Best Arthouse Film	Whiplash	Won	
St. Louis Film Critics Association	December 15, 2014	Best Supporting Actor	J. K. Simmons	Won	
St. Louis Film Critics Association	December 15, 2014	Best Original Screenplay	Damien Chazelle	Nominated	
St. Louis Film Critics Association	December 15, 2014	Best Music Soundtrack	Whiplash	Nominated	
St. Louis Film Critics Association	December 15, 2014	Best Scene	"Finale drum solo"	Nominated	
Sundance Film Festival	January 25, 2014	Audience Award (Dramatic)	Damien Chazelle	Won	
Sundance Film Festival	January 25, 2014	Grand Jury Prize (Dramatic)	Damien Chazelle	Won	
Tallinn Black Nights Film Festival	November 29, 2014	Best North American Independent Film	Damien Chazelle	Nominated	
Toronto Film Critics Association	January 6, 2015	Best Supporting Actor	J. K. Simmons	Won	
Valladolid International Film Festival	October 25, 2014	Pilar Miró Award (Best New Director)	Damien Chazelle	Won	
Valladolid International Film Festival	October 25, 2014	Golden Spike (Best Film)	Damien Chazelle	Nominated	
Village Voice Film Poll	December 17, 2014	Best Film	Whiplash	Nominated	
Village Voice Film Poll	December 17, 2014	Best Supporting Actor	J. K. Simmons	Won	
Washington D.C. Area Film Critics Association	December 8, 2014	Best Film	Whiplash	Nominated	
Washington D.C. Area Film Critics Association	December 8, 2014	Best Director	Damien Chazelle	Nominated	
Washington D.C. Area Film Critics Association	December 8, 2014	Best Supporting Actor	J. K. Simmons	Won	
Washington D.C. Area Film Critics Association	December 8, 2014	Best Original Screenplay	Damien Chazelle	Nominated	
Washington D.C. Area Film Critics Association	December 8, 2014	Best Editing	Tom Cross	Nominated	
Writers Guild of America Awards	February 14, 2015	Best Original Screenplay	Damien Chazelle	Nominated	

== See also ==
- 2014 in film
