= 68th British Academy Film Awards =

2015 film award ceremony

- Date: 8 February 2015
- Site: Royal Opera House, London
- Hosted by: Stephen Fry

Highlights
- Best Film: Boyhood
- Best British Film: The Theory of Everything
- Best Actor: Eddie Redmayne; The Theory of Everything
- Best Actress: Julianne Moore; Still Alice
- Most awards: The Grand Budapest Hotel (5)
- Most nominations: The Grand Budapest Hotel (11)

The 68th British Academy Film Awards, more commonly known as the BAFTAs, were held on 8 February 2015 at the Royal Opera House in London, honouring the best national and foreign films of 2014. Presented by the British Academy of Film and Television Arts, accolades were handed out for the best feature-length film and documentaries of any nationality that were screened at British cinemas in 2014.

The nominations were announced on 9 January 2015 by Stephen Fry and actor Sam Claflin. The ceremony was broadcast on BBC One and BBC Three. It was hosted by Stephen Fry for the tenth time in the award's history. The ceremony opened with a number "Stevie" by the British rock band Kasabian.

Boyhood won three of its five nominations, including Best Film, Best Director for Richard Linklater, and Best Actress in a Supporting Role for Patricia Arquette. Eddie Redmayne won Best Actor in a Leading Role for The Theory of Everything, Julianne Moore won Best Actress in a Leading Role for Still Alice, and J. K. Simmons won Best Actor in a Supporting Role for Whiplash. The Grand Budapest Hotel won five of its eleven nominations, the most of any film. Jack O'Connell won the Rising Star Award. The Theory of Everything, directed by James Marsh, was voted Outstanding British Film of 2014, while The Lego Movie won Best Animated Film and Citizenfour won Best Documentary.

The telecast garnered more than 5.09 million viewers in UK, with the viewing figures slightly higher than previous year ceremony.

== Winners and nominees ==
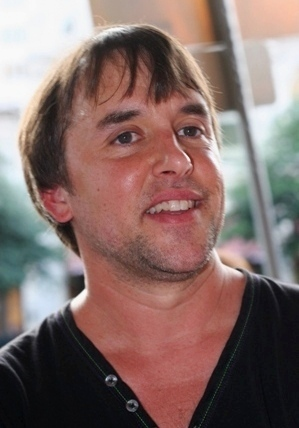
Richard Linklater, Best Director winner

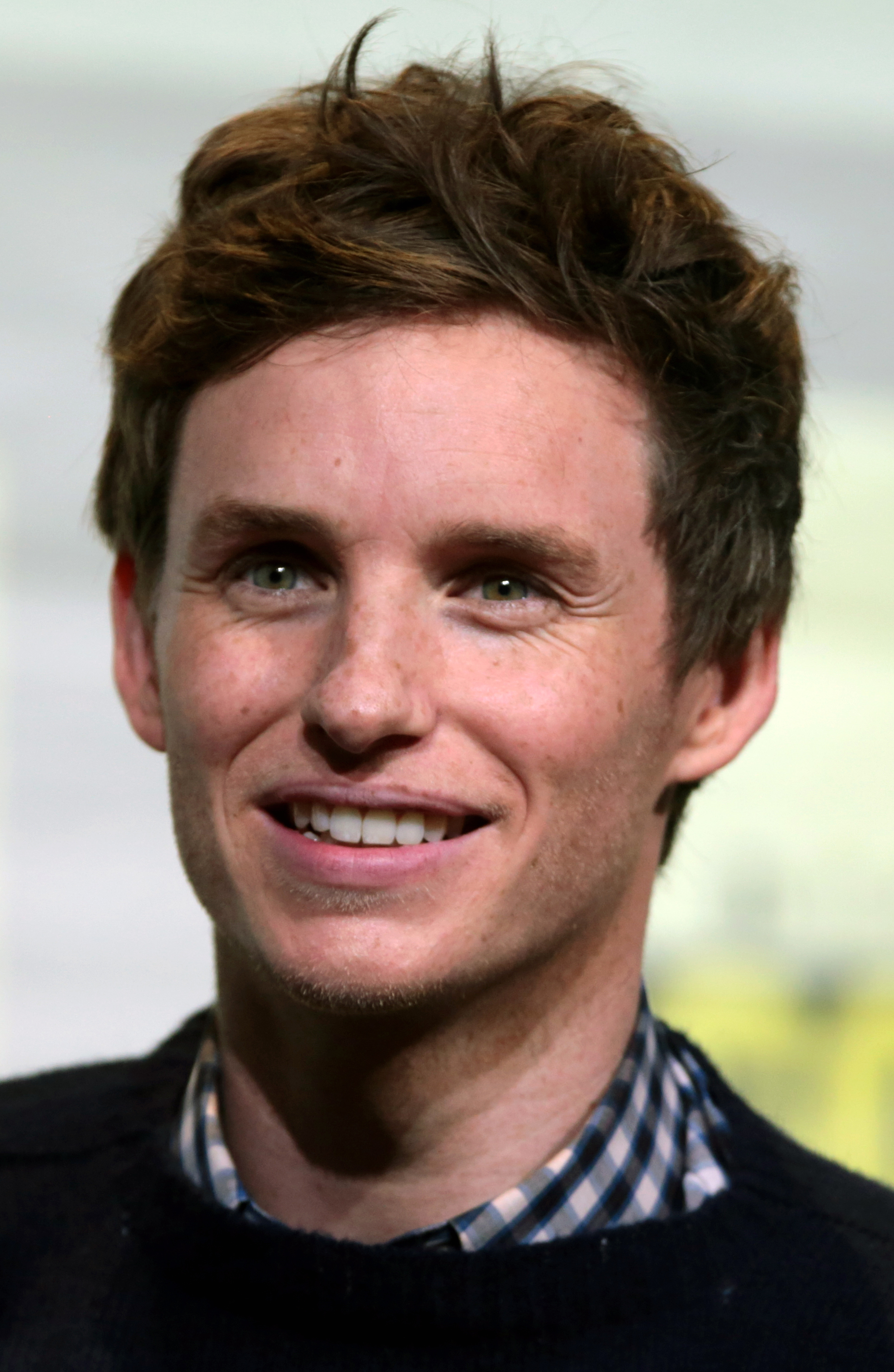
Eddie Redmayne, Best Actor winner

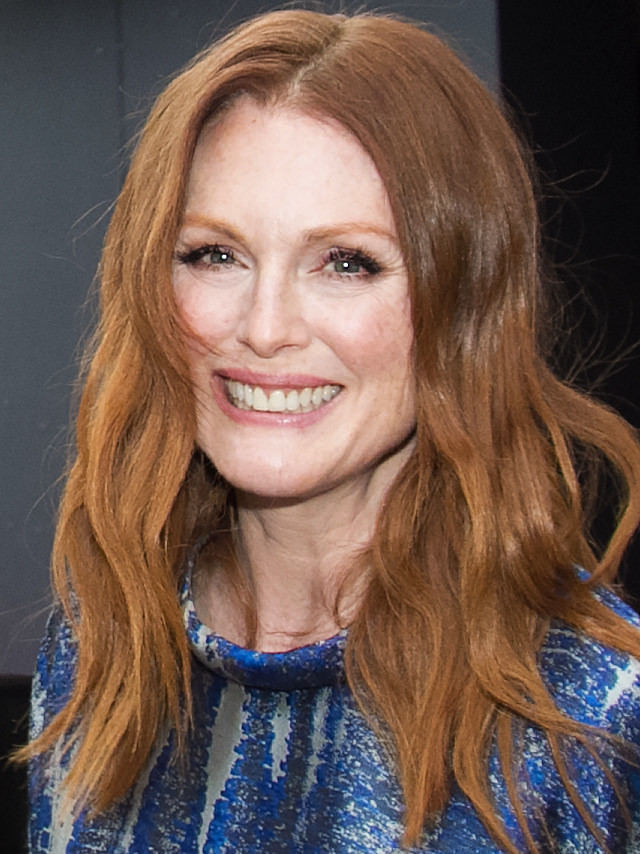
Julianne Moore, Best Actress winner

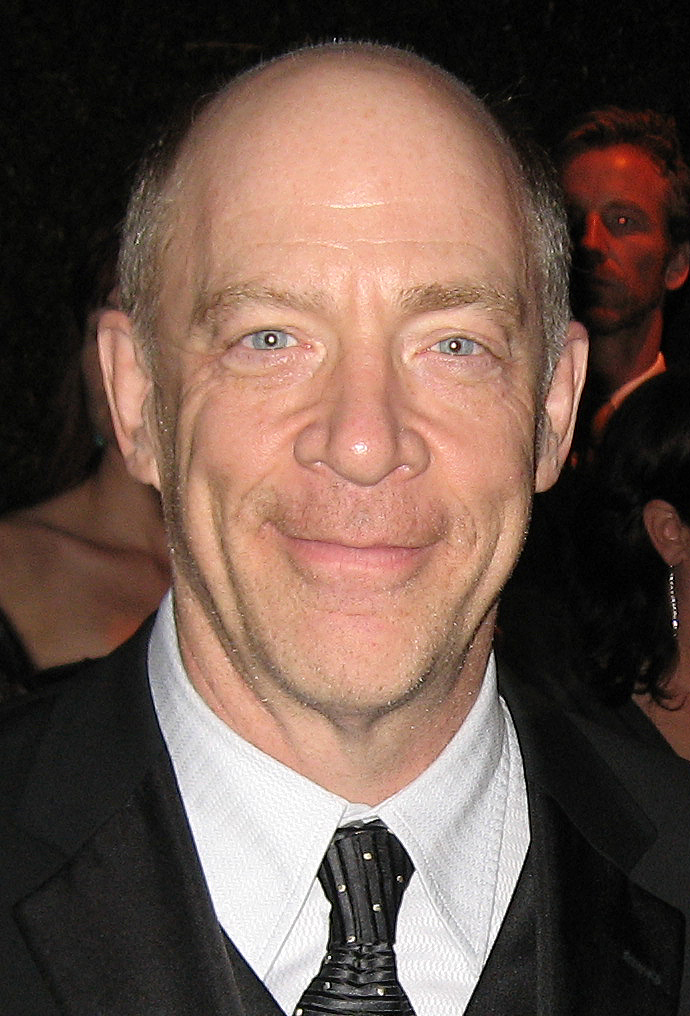
J. K. Simmons, Best Supporting Actor winner

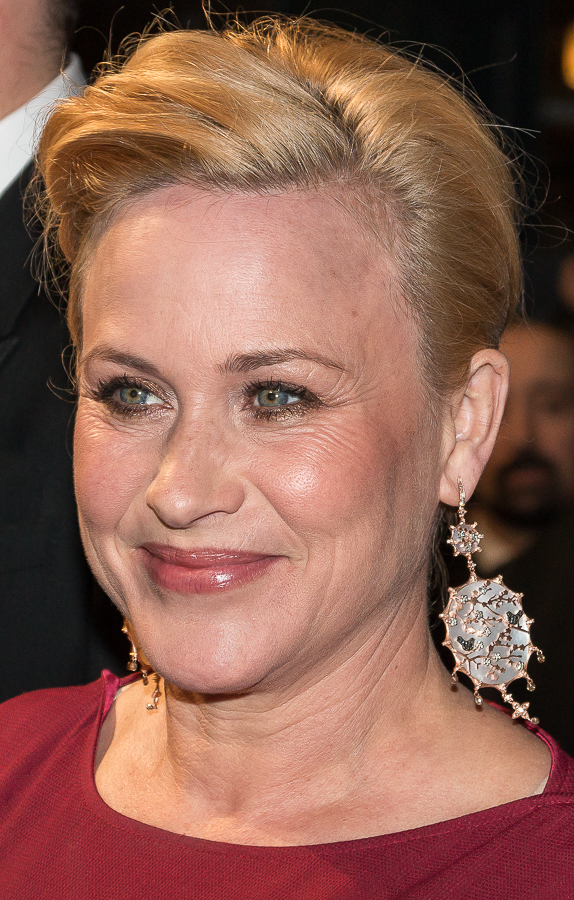
Patricia Arquette, Best Supporting Actress winner

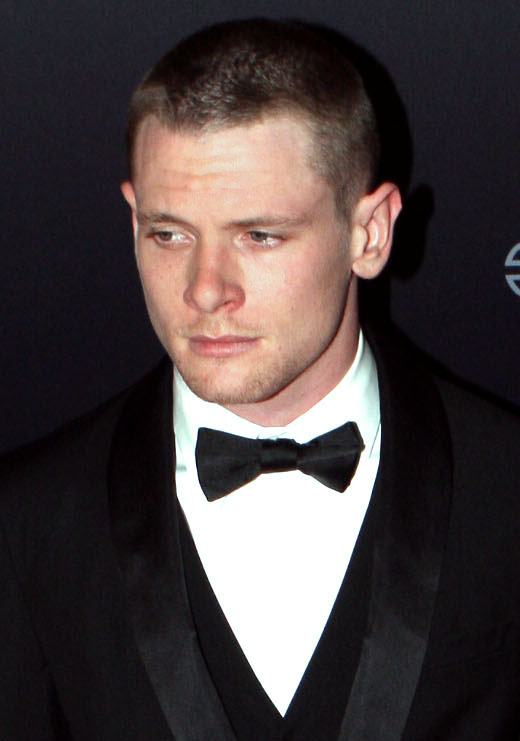
Jack O'Connell, EE Rising Star Award winner

=== BAFTA Fellowship ===
- Mike Leigh

=== Outstanding British Contribution to Cinema ===
- BBC Films

Best Film: Boyhood – Richard Linklater and Cathleen Sutherland; Birdman – Alejandro González Iñárritu, John Lesher and James W. Skotchdopole; The Grand Budapest Hotel – Wes Anderson, Scott Rudin, Steven Rales and Jeremy Dawson; The Imitation Game – Nora Grossman, Ido Ostrowsky and Teddy Schwarzman; The Theory of Everything – Tim Bevan, Eric Fellner, Lisa Bruce and Anthony McCarten	Best Direction: Richard Linklater – Boyhood; Wes Anderson – The Grand Budapest Hotel; Damien Chazelle – Whiplash; Alejandro González Iñárritu – Birdman; James Marsh – The Theory of Everything
Best Actor in a Leading Role: Eddie Redmayne – The Theory of Everything as Stephen Hawking; Benedict Cumberbatch – The Imitation Game as Alan Turing; Ralph Fiennes – The Grand Budapest Hotel as Monsieur Gustave H.; Jake Gyllenhaal – Nightcrawler as Louis Bloom; Michael Keaton – Birdman as Riggan Thomson	Best Actress in a Leading Role: Julianne Moore – Still Alice as Alice Daly Howland; Amy Adams – Big Eyes as Margaret Keane; Felicity Jones – The Theory of Everything as Jane Hawking; Rosamund Pike – Gone Girl as Amy Elliott Dunne; Reese Witherspoon – Wild as Cheryl Strayed
Best Actor in a Supporting Role: J. K. Simmons – Whiplash as Terence Fletcher; Steve Carell – Foxcatcher as John du Pont; Ethan Hawke – Boyhood as Mason Evans Sr.; Edward Norton – Birdman as Mike Shiner; Mark Ruffalo – Foxcatcher as Dave Schultz	Best Actress in a Supporting Role: Patricia Arquette – Boyhood as Olivia Evans; Keira Knightley – The Imitation Game as Joan Clarke; Rene Russo – Nightcrawler as Nina Romina; Imelda Staunton – Pride as Hefina Headon; Emma Stone – Birdman as Sam Thomson
Best Original Screenplay: The Grand Budapest Hotel – Wes Anderson; Birdman – Alejandro González Iñárritu, Nicolás Giacobone, Alexander Dinelaris Jr. and Armando Bó; Boyhood – Richard Linklater; Nightcrawler – Dan Gilroy; Whiplash – Damien Chazelle	Best Adapted Screenplay: The Theory of Everything – Anthony McCarten; American Sniper – Jason Hall; Gone Girl – Gillian Flynn; The Imitation Game – Graham Moore; Paddington – Paul King
Best Cinematography: Birdman – Emmanuel Lubezki; The Grand Budapest Hotel – Robert Yeoman; Ida – Łukasz Żal and Ryszard Lenczewski; Interstellar – Hoyte van Hoytema; Mr. Turner – Dick Pope	Best Costume Design: The Grand Budapest Hotel – Milena Canonero; The Imitation Game – Sammy Sheldon Differ; Into the Woods – Colleen Atwood; Mr. Turner – Jacqueline Durran; The Theory of Everything – Steven Noble
Best Editing: Whiplash – Tom Cross; Birdman – Douglas Crise and Stephen Mirrione; The Grand Budapest Hotel – Barney Pilling; The Imitation Game – William Goldenberg; Nightcrawler – John Gilroy; The Theory of Everything – Jinx Godfrey	Best Makeup and Hair: The Grand Budapest Hotel – Frances Hannon and Mark Coulier; Guardians of the Galaxy – Elizabeth Yianni-Georgiou and David White; Into the Woods – Peter King and J. Roy Helland; Mr. Turner – Christine Blundell and Lesa Warrener; The Theory of Everything – Jan Sewell and Kristyan Mallett
Best Original Music: The Grand Budapest Hotel – Alexandre Desplat; Birdman – Antonio Sánchez; Interstellar – Hans Zimmer; The Theory of Everything – Jóhann Jóhannsson; Under the Skin – Micachu	Best Production Design: The Grand Budapest Hotel – Adam Stockhausen and Anna Pinnock; Big Eyes – Rick Heinrichs and Shane Vieau; The Imitation Game – Maria Djurkovic and Tatiana Macdonald; Interstellar – Nathan Crowley and Gary Fettis; Mr. Turner – Suzie Davies and Charlotte Watts
Best Sound: Whiplash – Thomas Curley, Ben Wilkins and Craig Mann; American Sniper – Walt Martin, John T. Reitz, Gregg Rudloff, Alan Robert Murray and Bub Asman; Birdman – Thomas Varga, Martin Hernández, Aaron Glascock, Jon Taylor and Frank A. Montaño; The Grand Budapest Hotel – Wayne Lemmer, Christopher Scarabosio and Pawel Wdowczak; The Imitation Game – John Midgley, Lee Walpole, Stuart Hilliker, Martin Jensen and Andy Kennedy	Best Special Visual Effects: Interstellar – Paul Franklin, Scott R. Fisher, Andrew Lockley and Ian Hunter; Dawn of the Planet of the Apes – Joe Letteri, Dan Lemmon, Erik Winquist and Daniel Barrett; Guardians of the Galaxy – Stephane Ceretti, Paul Corbould, Jonathan Fawkner and Nicolas Aithadi; The Hobbit: The Battle of the Five Armies – Joe Letteri, Eric Saindon, David Clayton and R. Christopher White; X-Men: Days of Future Past – Richard Stammers, Anders Langlands, Tim Crosbie and Cameron Waldbauer
Outstanding British Film: The Theory of Everything – James Marsh, Tim Bevan, Eric Fellner, Lisa Bruce and Anthony McCarten; '71 – Yann Demange, Angus Lamont, Robin Gutch and Gregory Burke; The Imitation Game – Morten Tyldum, Nora Grossman, Ido Ostrowsky, Teddy Schwarzman and Graham Moore; Paddington – Paul King and David Heyman; Pride – Matthew Warchus, David Livingstone and Stephen Beresford; Under the Skin – Jonathan Glazer, James Wilson, Nick Wechsler and Walter Campbell	Outstanding Debut by a British Writer, Director or Producer: Pride – Stephen Beresford (Writer) and David Livingstone (Producer); '71 – Gregory Burke (Writer) and Yann Demange (Director); Kajaki – Paul Katis (Director/Producer) and Andrew de Lotbiniere (Producer); Lilting – Hong Khaou (Director/Producer); Northern Soul – Elaine Constantine (Director/Producer)
Best Short Animation: The Bigger Picture – Chris Hees, Daisy Jacobs and Jennifer Majka; Money Love Experiments – Ainslie Henderson, Cam Fraser and Will Anderson; My Dad – Marcus Armitage	Best Short Film: Boogaloo and Graham – Brian J. Falconer, Michael Lennox and Ronan Blaney; Emotional Fusebox – Michael Berliner and Rachel Tunnard; The Karman Line – Campbell Beaton, Dawn King, Tiernan Hanby and Oscar Sharp; Slap – Islay Bell-Webb, Michelangelo Fano and Nick Rowland; Three Brothers – Aleem Khan, Matthieu de Braconier and Stephanie Paeplow
Best Animated Film: The Lego Movie – Phil Lord and Christopher Miller; Big Hero 6 – Don Hall and Chris Williams; The Boxtrolls – Anthony Stacchi and Graham Annable	Best Documentary: Citizenfour – Laura Poitras, Mathilde Bonnefoy and Dirk Wilutzky; 20 Feet from Stardom – Morgan Neville, Caitrin Rogers and Gil Friesen; 20,000 Days on Earth – Iain Forsyth and Jane Pollard; Finding Vivian Maier – John Maloof and Charlie Siskel; Virunga – Orlando von Einsiedel and Joanna Natasegara
Best Film Not in the English Language: Ida – Paweł Pawlikowski, Eric Abraham, Piotr Dzieciol and Ewa Puszczynska; Leviathan – Andrey Zvyagintsev, Alexander Rodnyansky and Sergey Melkumov; The Lunchbox – Ritesh Batra, Arun Rangachari, Anurag Kashyap and Guneet Monga; Trash – Stephen Daldry, Tim Bevan, Eric Fellner and Kris Thykier; Two Days, One Night – Jean-Pierre Dardenne, Luc Dardenne and Denis Freyd	Rising Star Award: Jack O'Connell; Gugu Mbatha-Raw; Margot Robbie; Miles Teller; Shailene Woodley

== Statistics ==
Films that received multiple nominations
Nominations	Film
11	The Grand Budapest Hotel
10	Birdman
10	The Theory of Everything
9	The Imitation Game
5	Boyhood
5	Whiplash
4	Interstellar
4	Mr. Turner
4	Nightcrawler
3	Pride
2	'71
2	American Sniper
2	Big Eyes
2	Foxcatcher
2	Gone Girl
2	Guardians of the Galaxy
2	Ida
2	Into the Woods
2	Paddington
2	Under the Skin

Films that received multiple awards
Awards	Film
5	The Grand Budapest Hotel
3	Boyhood
3	The Theory of Everything
3	Whiplash

== In Memoriam ==
- Mickey Rooney
- Mike Nichols
- Alain Resnais
- Eli Wallach
- Harold Ramis
- Dick Smith
- HR Giger
- Billie Whitelaw
- Gordon Willis
- Anita Ekberg
- Dora Bryan
- Gerry Fisher
- Richard Kiel
- Chris Collins
- Assheton Gorton
- Walt Martin
- Sid Caesar
- Robin Williams
- Johnny Goodman
- Luise Rainer
- Gabriel Axel
- Malik Bendjelloul
- Oswald Morris
- Samuel Goldwyn Jr.
- Terry Richards
- David Ryall
- Lauren Bacall

== See also ==
- 4th AACTA International Awards
- 87th Academy Awards
- 40th César Awards
- 20th Critics' Choice Awards
- 67th Directors Guild of America Awards
- 28th European Film Awards
- 72nd Golden Globe Awards
- 35th Golden Raspberry Awards
- 29th Goya Awards
- 30th Independent Spirit Awards
- 20th Lumière Awards
- 5th Magritte Awards
- 2nd Platino Awards
- 26th Producers Guild of America Awards
- 19th Satellite Awards
- 41st Saturn Awards
- 21st Screen Actors Guild Awards
- 67th Writers Guild of America Awards
