= 4th AACTA International Awards =

Australian film and TV awards ceremony in 2015

- Date: 31 January 2015
- Site: Los Angeles, California
- Hosted by: Nicole Kidman; Geoffrey Rush

Highlights
- Best Film: Birdman
- Most awards: Birdman (4)
- Most nominations: Birdman (7)

Television coverage
- Channel: Arena

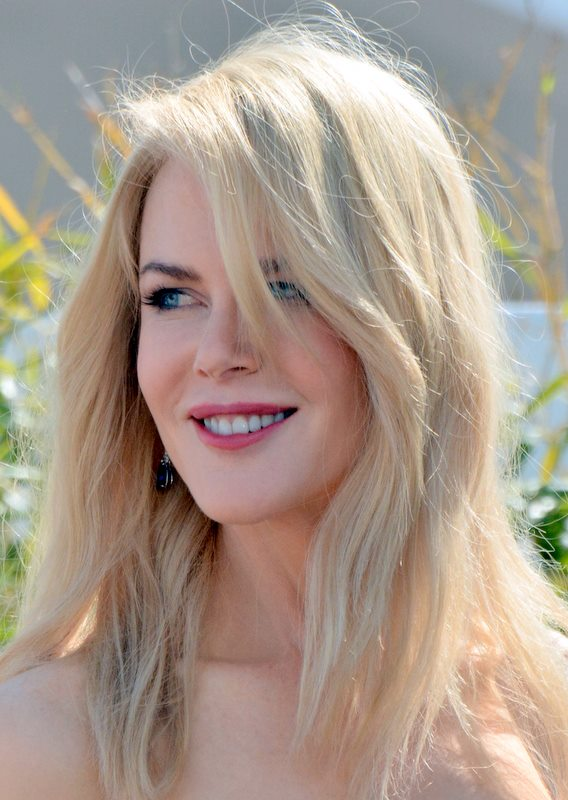
Nicole Kidman at the 2017 Cannes Film Festival

The 4th Australian Academy of Cinema and Television Arts International Awards (commonly known as the AACTA International Awards), were presented by the Australian Academy of Cinema and Television Arts (AACTA), a non-profit organisation whose aim is to identify, award, promote and celebrate Australia's greatest achievements in film and television. Awards were handed out for the best films of 2014 regardless of the country of origin, and are the international counterpart to the awards for Australian films (held on 27 and 29 January). The winners were announced in Los Angeles, California on 31 January 2015 as part of the Australia Week event. The ceremony was hosted by Nicole Kidman and Geoffrey Rush and broadcast in Australia on Arena on 1 February.

The nominees were announced on 7 January 2015. Birdman received the most nominations with seven in all categories except Best Lead Actress.

== Background ==
On 9 December 2014, a partnership between AACTA and G'day LA organisers was announced. At this announcement it was revealed that the 4th AACTA International Awards will be presented during the G'day LA black tie gala, an event which usually hands out awards for achievements by Australians in Hollywood. Nominees were chosen by the international chapter of the academy which comprises 140 members of Australian filmmakers and executives "with distinguished international credentials." The ceremony was held on 31 January and presided over by Nicole Kidman and Geoffrey Rush. The event was broadcast in Australia on subscription television channel Arena for the second year running on 1 February 2015.

== Winners and nominees ==
The final nominees were announced on 7 January 2015. Of those nominated, Birdman or (The Unexpected Virtue of Ignorance) received the most nominations with seven in all categories except for Best Actress. Other nominated productions include Boyhood and The Imitation Game with five, Whiplash with four, The Grand Budapest Hotel with three, Foxcatcher and The Theory of Everything with two and The Babadook, Dawn of the Planet of the Apes, Gone Girl, Into the Woods, Still Alice and Wild with one each.

Best Film	Best Direction
Birdman; Boyhood; The Grand Budapest Hotel; The Imitation Game; Whiplash	Alejandro G. Iñárritu – Birdman; Richard Linklater – Boyhood; Wes Anderson – The Grand Budapest Hotel; Morten Tyldum – The Imitation Game; Damien Chazelle – Whiplash
Best Actor	Best Actress
Michael Keaton – Birdman as Riggan Thomson; Steve Carell – Foxcatcher as John Eleuthère du Pont; Benedict Cumberbatch – The Imitation Game as Alan Turing; Jake Gyllenhaal – Nightcrawler as Louis “Lou” Bloom; Eddie Redmayne – The Theory of Everything as Stephen Hawking	Julianne Moore – Still Alice as Dr. Alice Howland; Essie Davis – The Babadook as Amelia Vanek; Felicity Jones – The Theory of Everything as Jane Wilde Hawking; Rosamund Pike – Gone Girl as Amy Elliott-Dunne; Reese Witherspoon – Wild as Cheryl Strayed
Best Supporting Actor	Best Supporting Actress
J. K. Simmons – Whiplash as Terence Fletcher; Ethan Hawke – Boyhood as Mason Evans, Sr.; Edward Norton – Birdman as Mike Shiner; Mark Ruffalo – Foxcatcher as Dave Schultz; Andy Serkis – Dawn of the Planet of the Apes as Caesar	Patricia Arquette – Boyhood as Olivia Evans; Keira Knightley – The Imitation Game as Joan Clarke; Emma Stone – Birdman as Sam Thomson; Meryl Streep – Into the Woods as The Witch; Naomi Watts – Birdman as Lesley
Best Screenplay
Alejandro G. Iñárritu, Nicolás Giacobone, Alexander Dinelaris Jr., and Armando Bo – Birdman; Wes Anderson – The Grand Budapest Hotel; Damien Chazelle – Whiplash; Richard Linklater – Boyhood; Graham Moore – The Imitation Game

== See also ==
- 4th AACTA Awards
- 20th Critics’ Choice Awards
- 21st Screen Actors Guild Awards
- 68th British Academy Film Awards
- 72nd Golden Globe Awards
- 87th Academy Awards
