= San Francisco Film Critics Circle Awards 2014 =

Annual US film awards ceremony

13th SFFCC Awards

December 14, 2014

Best Picture:
Boyhood

The 13th San Francisco Film Critics Circle Awards, honoring the best in film for 2014, were given on December 14, 2014.

== Winners ==
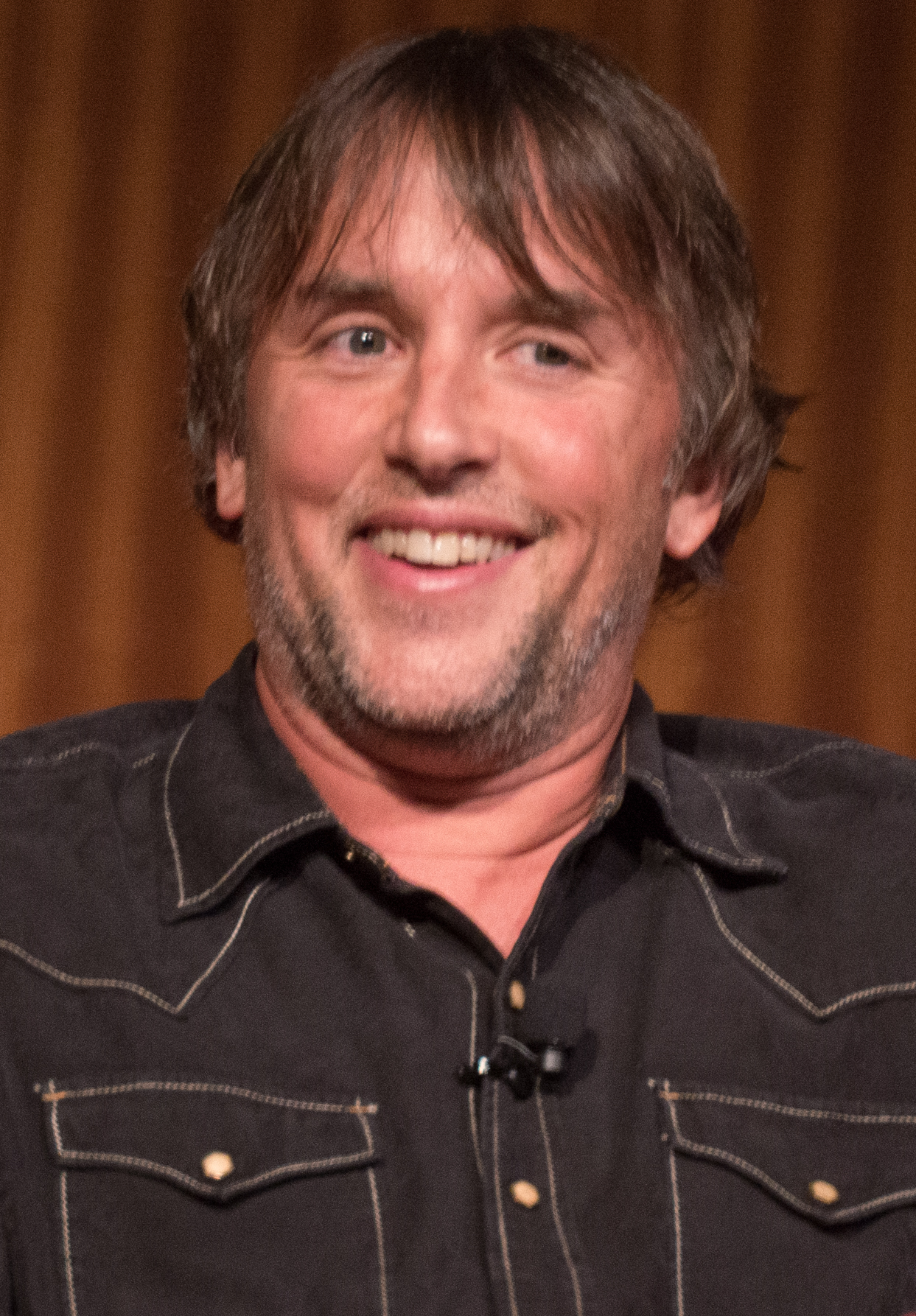
Richard Linklater, Best Director winner

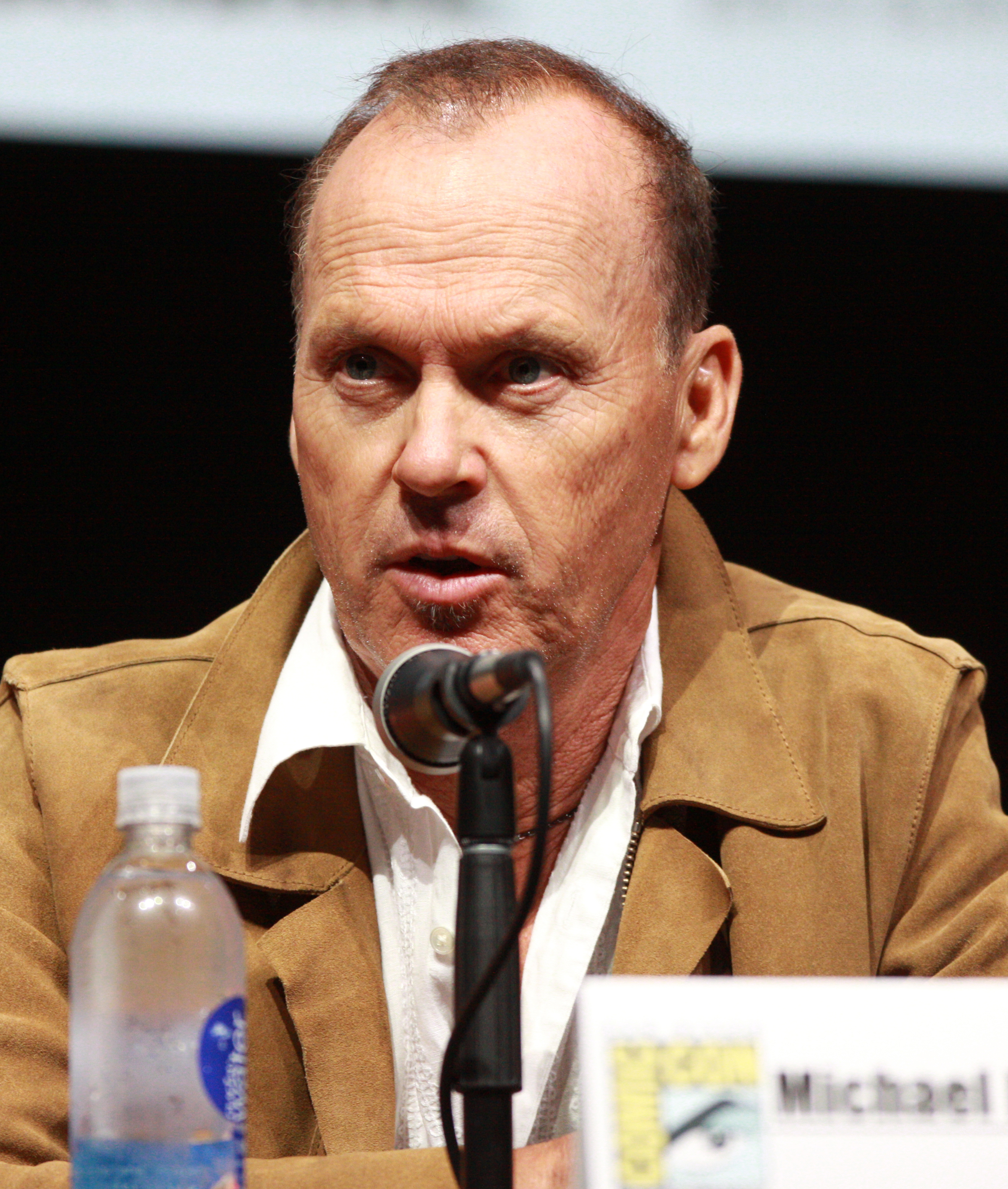
Michael Keaton, Best Actor winner

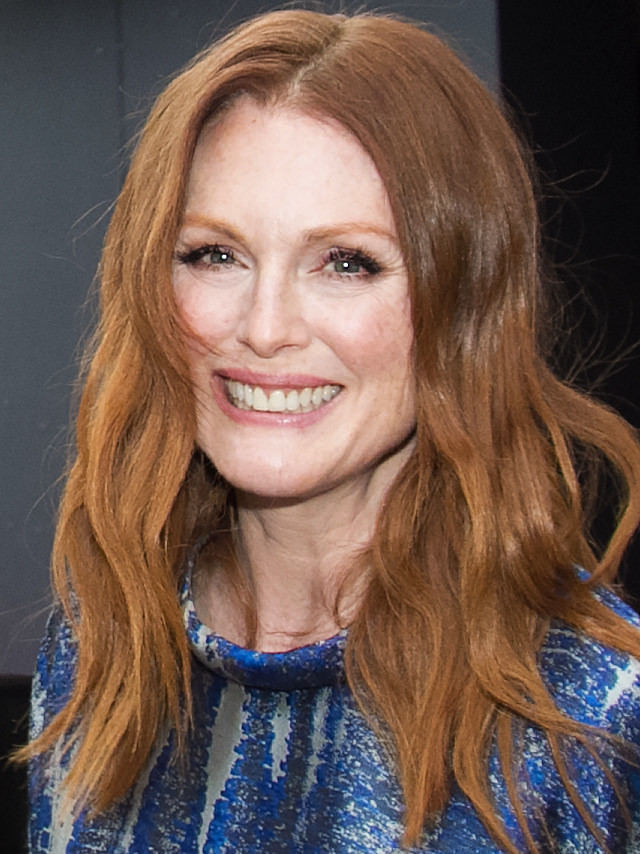
Julianne Moore, Best Actress winner

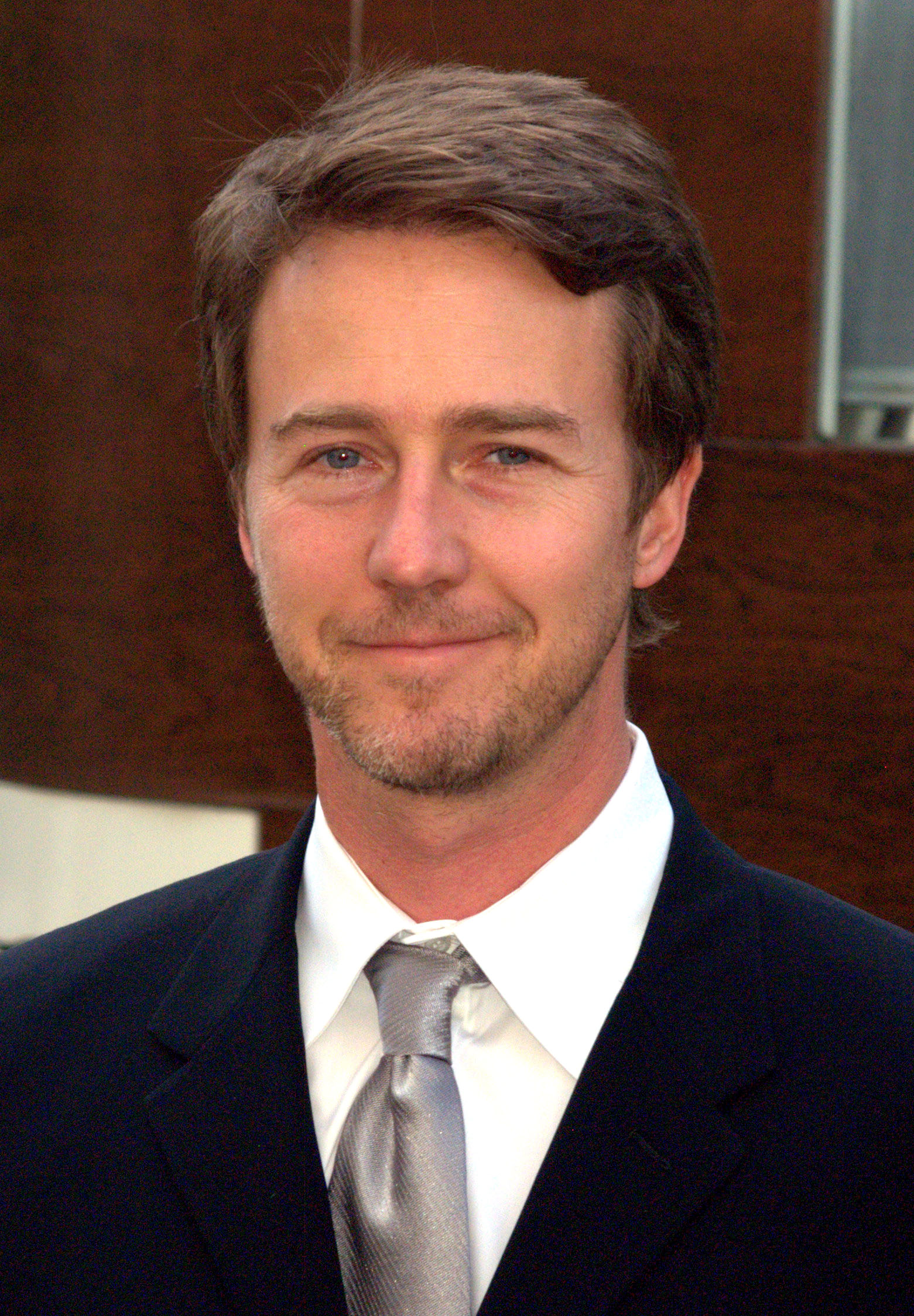
Edward Norton, Best Supporting Actor winner

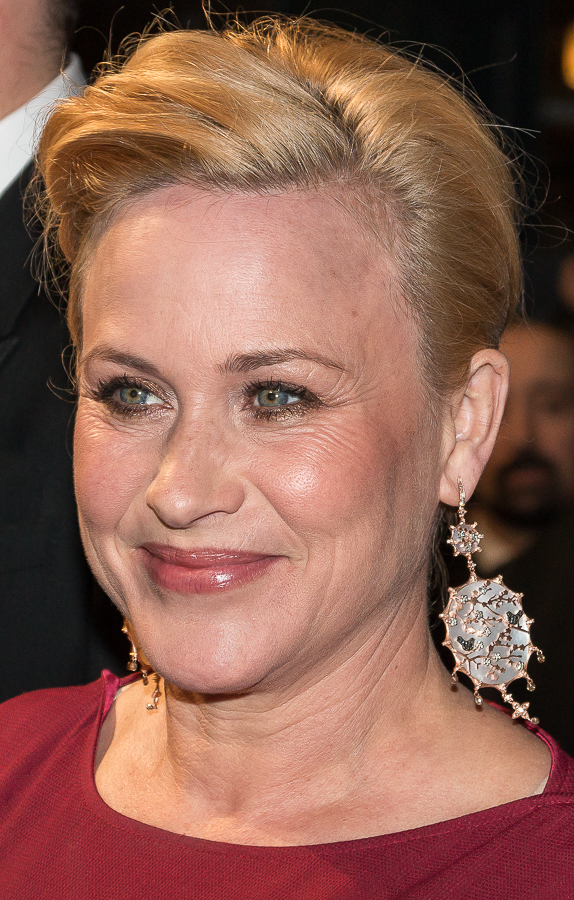
Patricia Arquette, Best Supporting Actress winner

=== Best Picture ===
Boyhood

- Birdman
- The Imitation Game
- Under the Skin
- Whiplash

=== Best Director ===
Richard Linklater – Boyhood

- Wes Anderson – The Grand Budapest Hotel
- Jonathan Glazer – Under the Skin
- Alejandro G. Iñárritu – Birdman
- Mike Leigh – Mr. Turner

=== Best Actor ===
Michael Keaton – Birdman

- Benedict Cumberbatch – The Imitation Game
- Jake Gyllenhaal – Nightcrawler
- Eddie Redmayne – The Theory of Everything
- Timothy Spall – Mr. Turner

=== Best Actress ===
Julianne Moore – Still Alice

- Marion Cotillard – Two Days, One Night
- Essie Davis – The Babadook
- Scarlett Johansson – Under the Skin
- Reese Witherspoon – Wild

=== Best Supporting Actor ===
Edward Norton – Birdman

- Ethan Hawke – Boyhood
- Gene Jones – The Sacrament
- Mark Ruffalo – Foxcatcher
- J. K. Simmons – Whiplash

=== Best Supporting Actress ===
Patricia Arquette – Boyhood

- Jessica Chastain – A Most Violent Year
- Agata Kulesza – Ida
- Emma Stone – Birdman
- Tilda Swinton – Snowpiercer

=== Best Original Screenplay ===
Birdman – Alejandro G. Iñárritu, Nicolás Giacobone, Alexander Dinelaris Jr., and Armando Bo

- Boyhood – Richard Linklater
- The Grand Budapest Hotel – Wes Anderson and Hugo Guinness
- A Most Violent Year – J. C. Chandor
- Mr. Turner – Mike Leigh
- Whiplash – Damien Chazelle

=== Best Adapted Screenplay ===
Inherent Vice – Paul Thomas Anderson

- Gone Girl – Gillian Flynn
- The Imitation Game – Graham Moore
- Snowpiercer – Bong Joon-ho and Kelly Masterson
- Wild – Nick Hornby

=== Best Cinematography ===
Ida – Łukasz Żal and Ryszard Lenczewski

- Birdman – Emmanuel Lubezki
- The Grand Budapest Hotel – Robert Yeoman
- Mr. Turner – Dick Pope
- Under the Skin – Daniel Landin

=== Best Production Design ===
The Grand Budapest Hotel – Adam Stockhausen

- Birdman – Kevin Thompson
- Inherent Vice – David Crank
- Mr. Turner – Suzie Davies
- Snowpiercer – Ondrej Nekvasil

=== Best Editing ===
Boyhood – Sandra Adair

- Birdman – Douglas Crise and Stephen Mirrione
- Inherent Vice – Leslie Jones
- Under the Skin – Paul Watts
- Whiplash – Tom Cross

=== Best Animated Feature ===
The Lego Movie

- Big Hero 6
- The Boxtrolls
- How to Train Your Dragon 2
- The Tale of the Princess Kaguya

=== Best Foreign Language Picture ===
Ida – Poland / Denmark

- A Girl Walks Home Alone at Night – Iran
- Force Majeure – Sweden
- Two Days, One Night – Belgium
- Wild Tales – Argentina

=== Best Documentary ===
Citizenfour

- Finding Vivian Maier
- Jodorowsky's Dune
- Life Itself
- The Overnighters

=== Marlon Riggs Award for courage & vision in the Bay Area film community ===
Joel Shepard

=== Special Citation for under-appreciated independent cinema ===
The One I Love
