= Tom Cross (film editor) =

American television and film editor

- Born: Milwaukee, Wisconsin, U.S.
- Education: State University of New York at Purchase (BFA, 1993)
- Occupation: Film editor
- Years active: 1997–present
- Spouse: Holly Ramos
- Children: 2

Tom Cross is an American television and film editor. He is known for his collaborations with Damien Chazelle, including Whiplash (2014), for which he won the Academy Award for Best Film Editing, La La Land (2016), and First Man (2018).

== Early life ==
Tom has a Vietnamese mother, Mrs. Loc Vo - an artist (linocut/serigraphy), originally from Hue, and his father is Jim Cross. In 1993, he graduated with a degree in visual arts from Purchase College, New York State.

== Career ==
He began his career in 1997 as an assistant editor, contributing to such diverse projects as We Own the Night (2007), Crazy Heart (2009), The Switch (2010) and the Primetime Emmy Award-winning drama series Deadwood. He came to worldwide prominence in 2015 when he won the Independent Spirit Award for Best Editing, BAFTA Award for Best Editing and Academy Award for Best Editing (among other honors) for his work on the acclaimed film Whiplash (2014). and reunited with writer/director Damien Chazelle on the musical romantic comedy La La Land (2016).

He is also known for his work on David O. Russell's biographical drama Joy (2015), the musical The Greatest Showman (2016), Scott Cooper's western drama Hostiles (2017), and Cary Joji Fukunaga's James Bond film No Time to Die (2021).

== Influences ==
He has cited The Wild Bunch (1969) and The French Connection (1971) as influences.

== Personal life ==
Tom is married to Holly Ramos and they have two sons. When Cross received his first Oscar nomination, Ramos took to her blog to congratulate her husband and share her pride, she said: ".. Tom is the personification of Conan O’Brien’s quote. “if you work really really hard and are kind, amazing things will happen”. He inspires me everyday."

== Filmography ==
Year	Film	Director	Notes	Ref.
2010	The Space Between	Travis Fine		
2012	Any Day Now	Travis Fine		
2014	Whiplash	Damien Chazelle		
2014	Time Lapse	Bradley D. King		
2015	The Driftless Area	Zachary Slusser		
2015	Joy	David O. Russell	Co-edited with Alan Baumgarten, Christopher Tellefsen and Jay Cassidy	
2016	La La Land	Damien Chazelle		
2017	Hostiles	Scott Cooper		
2017	The Greatest Showman	Michael Gracey	Co-edited with Joe, Jon Poll, Michael McCusker, Robert Duffy and Spencer Susser	
2018	First Man	Damien Chazelle		
2021	No Time to Die	Cary Joji Fukunaga	Co-edited with Elliot Graham	
2022	Babylon	Damien Chazelle		
2026	Michael	Antoine Fuqua	Co-edited with Conrad Buff IV, John Ottman and Harry Yoon	
TBA	Untitled Damien Chazelle film †	Damien Chazelle		

== Accolades ==
Awards and nominations received by Tom Cross
Organizations (Note: Awards, festivals, honors and other miscellaneous organizations are listed in alphabetical order.)	Year (Note: Indicates the year of ceremony. Each year is linked to the article about the awards held that year, wherever possible.)	Category	Work	Result	Ref.
Academy Awards	2015	Best Film Editing	Whiplash	Won	
Academy Awards	2017	Best Film Editing	La La Land	Nominated	
Alliance of Women Film Journalists	2015	Best Editing	Whiplash	Nominated	
Alliance of Women Film Journalists	2016	Best Editing	La La Land	Nominated	
Austin Film Critics Association	2019	Best Film Editing	First Man	Won	
Boston Society of Film Critics	2016	Best Editing	La La Land	Won	
Boston Society of Film Critics	2018	Best Editing	First Man	Won	
British Academy Film Awards	2015	Best Editing	Whiplash	Won	
British Academy Film Awards	2017	Best Editing	La La Land	Nominated	
British Academy Film Awards	2019	Best Editing	First Man	Nominated	
British Academy Film Awards	2022	Best Editing	No Time to Die	Won	
British Film Editors Cut Above Awards	2022	Best Edited British Drama	No Time to Die	Nominated	
Chicago Film Critics Association	2014	Best Editing	Whiplash	Won	
Chicago Film Critics Association	2016	Best Editing	La La Land	Won	
Chicago Film Critics Association	2018	Best Editing	First Man	Nominated	
Chicago Film Critics Association	2022	Best Editing	Babylon	Nominated	
Critics' Choice Movie Awards	2015	Best Editing	Whiplash	Nominated	
Critics' Choice Movie Awards	2016	Best Editing	La La Land	Won	
Critics' Choice Movie Awards	2019	Best Editing	First Man	Won	
Critics' Choice Movie Awards	2023	Best Editing	Babylon	Nominated	
Eddie Awards	2015	Best Edited Feature Film – Dramatic	Whiplash	Nominated	
Eddie Awards	2016	Best Edited Feature Film – Comedy or Musical	Joy	Nominated	
Eddie Awards	2017	Best Edited Feature Film – Comedy or Musical	La La Land	Won	
Eddie Awards	2019	Best Edited Feature Film – Dramatic	First Man	Nominated	
Eddie Awards	2022	Best Edited Feature Film – Dramatic	No Time to Die	Nominated	
Gold Derby Awards	2015	Film Editing	Whiplash	Won	
Gold Derby Awards	2017	Film Editing	La La Land	Won	
Gold Derby Awards	2019	Film Editing	First Man	Won	
Gold Derby Awards	2020	Film Editing of the Decade	Whiplash	3rd place	
Gold Derby Awards	2020	Film Editing of the Decade	La La Land	Nominated	
Hollywood Film Awards	2018	Hollywood Editor Award	First Man	Won	
Hollywood Professional Association	2015	Outstanding Editing – Theatrical Feature	Whiplash	Won	
Hollywood Professional Association	2022	Outstanding Editing – Theatrical Feature	No Time to Die	Nominated	
Independent Spirit Awards	2015	Best Editing	Whiplash	Won	
IndieWire Critics Poll	2014	Best Editing	Whiplash	Runner-up	
IndieWire Critics Poll	2016	Best Editing	La La Land	3rd place	
International Cinephile Society	2015	Best Editing	Whiplash	Won	
Las Vegas Film Critics Society	2016	Best Film Editing	La La Land	Nominated	
London Film Critics' Circle	2015	Technical Achievement	Whiplash	Nominated	
Los Angeles Film Critics Association	2016	Best Editing	La La Land	Runner-up	
Online Film Critics Society	2014	Best Editing	Whiplash	Nominated	
Online Film Critics Society	2017	Best Editing	La La Land	Won	
Online Film Critics Society	2019	Best Editing	First Man	Nominated	
Phoenix Film Critics Society	2016	Best Film Editing	La La Land	Nominated	
San Diego Film Critics Society	2016	Best Editing	La La Land	Nominated	
San Francisco Bay Area Film Critics Circle	2014	Best Film Editing	Whiplash	Nominated	
San Francisco Bay Area Film Critics Circle	2016	Best Film Editing	La La Land	Nominated	
San Francisco Bay Area Film Critics Circle	2018	Best Film Editing	First Man	Nominated	
San Francisco Bay Area Film Critics Circle	2023	Best Film Editing	Babylon	Nominated	
Satellite Awards	2017	Best Editing	La La Land	Nominated	
Satellite Awards	2019	Best Editing	First Man	Nominated	
Seattle Film Critics Society	2017	Best Film Editing	La La Land	Nominated	
Seattle Film Critics Society	2018	Best Film Editing	First Man	Nominated	
St. Louis Gateway Film Critics Association	2016	Best Editing	La La Land	Runner-up	
St. Louis Gateway Film Critics Association	2018	Best Editing	First Man	Runner-up	
Washington D.C. Area Film Critics Association	2014	Best Editing	Whiplash	Nominated	
Washington D.C. Area Film Critics Association	2016	Best Editing	La La Land	Won	
Washington D.C. Area Film Critics Association	2018	Best Editing	First Man	Won	

== See also ==
- Asian Americans in arts and entertainment
- List of Academy Award winners and nominees of Asian descent
