= Craig Mann =

Canadian re-recording mixer

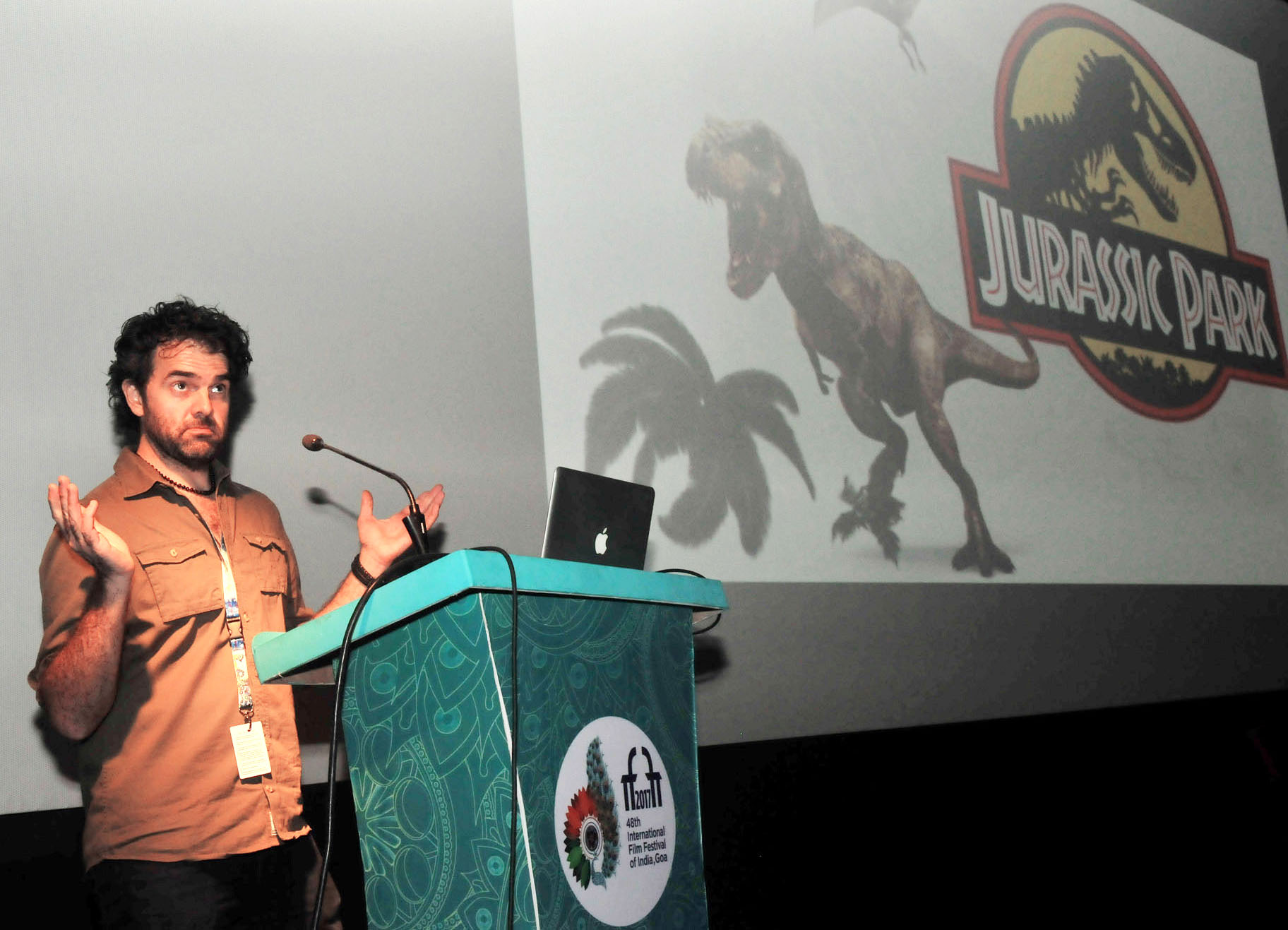
- Craig Mann, IFFI (2017)
- Born: Oakville, Ontario
- Education: Fanshawe College
- Occupation: Re-recording mixer
- Years active: 1998-present

Craig Mann is a Canadian re-recording mixer. He won an Oscar in the category Best Sound Mixing for Whiplash. He has worked on more than 110 films since 1998. Mann was born in Oakville, Ontario and raised in Pickering and Burlington. He graduated from the music engineering program at Fanshawe College in London, Ontario.

== Selected filmography ==
- Whiplash (2014)
- Uttama Villain (2015)
- Ponniyin Selvan 1 (2022)
- Ponniyin Selvan 2 (2023)
