= Ben Wilkins =

British re-recording mixer

- Occupation: Re-recording mixer
- Years active: 1991-present

Ben Wilkins is a British re-recording mixer. He has won an Academy Award in the category Best Sound for Whiplash. He has worked on more than 150 films since 1991.

== Selected filmography ==
- Whiplash (2014)
- Desterted (2016)
- Mansfield 66/67 (2017)
