= 20th Critics' Choice Awards =

2015 US film awards

- Date: January 15, 2015
- Site: Hollywood Palladium, California, United States
- Hosted by: Michael Strahan
- Official website: www.criticschoice.com

Highlights
- Best Film: Boyhood
- Most awards: Birdman (7)
- Most nominations: Birdman (13)

Television coverage
- Network: A&E

The 20th Critics' Choice Awards were presented on January 15, 2015, at the Hollywood Palladium, honoring the finest achievements of 2014 filmmaking. The ceremony was broadcast on A&E and hosted by Michael Strahan. The nominees were announced on December 15, 2014.

In recognition of the breadth of her accomplishments in 2014, Jessica Chastain received the first-ever Critics' Choice MVP Award. The honor celebrates "one extraordinary actor for his/her standout work in several movies throughout a single year".

== Winners and nominees ==
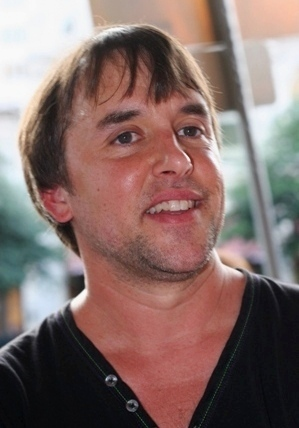
Richard Linklater, Best Director winner

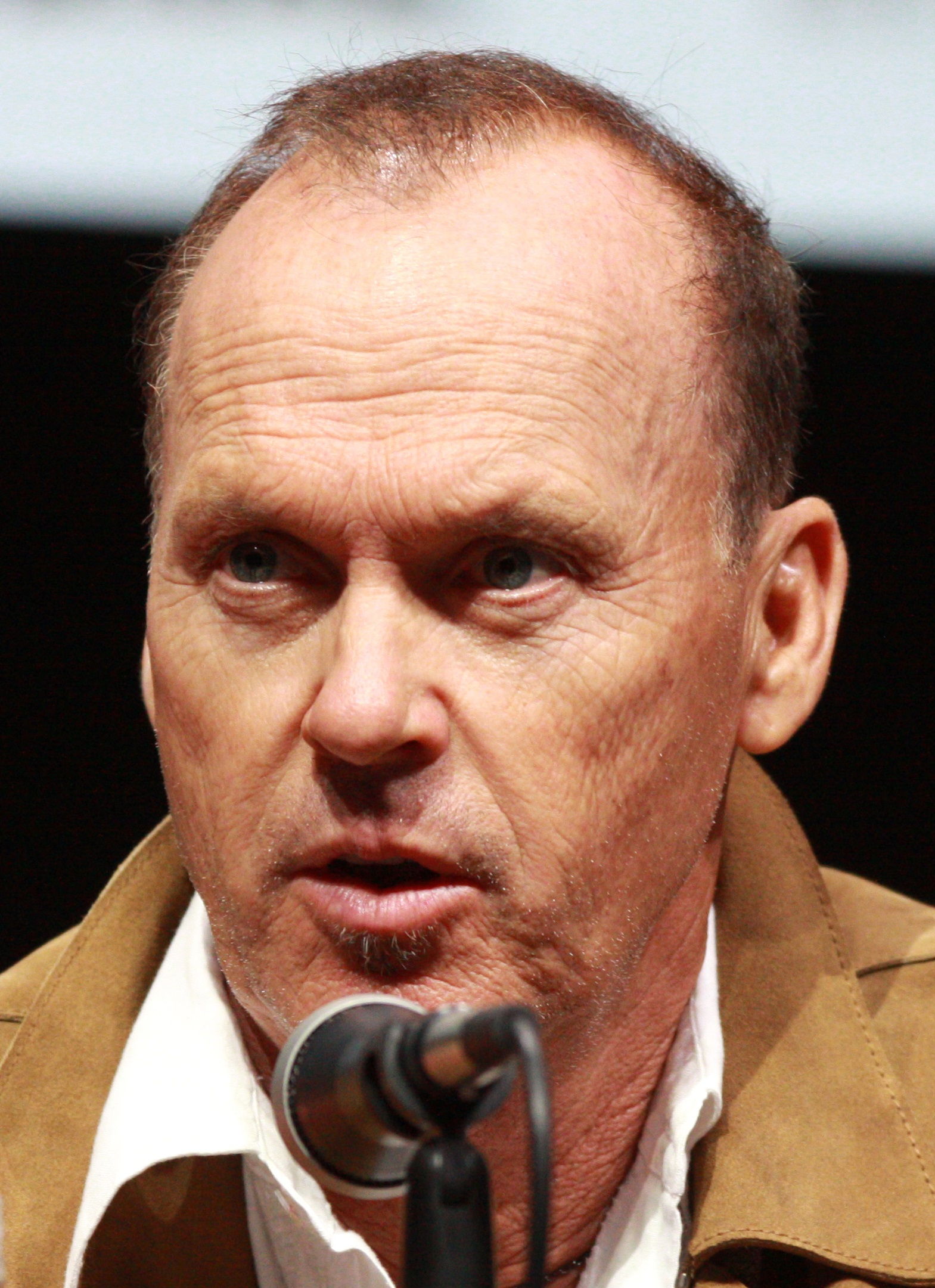
Michael Keaton, Best Actor and Best Actor in a Comedy Movie winner

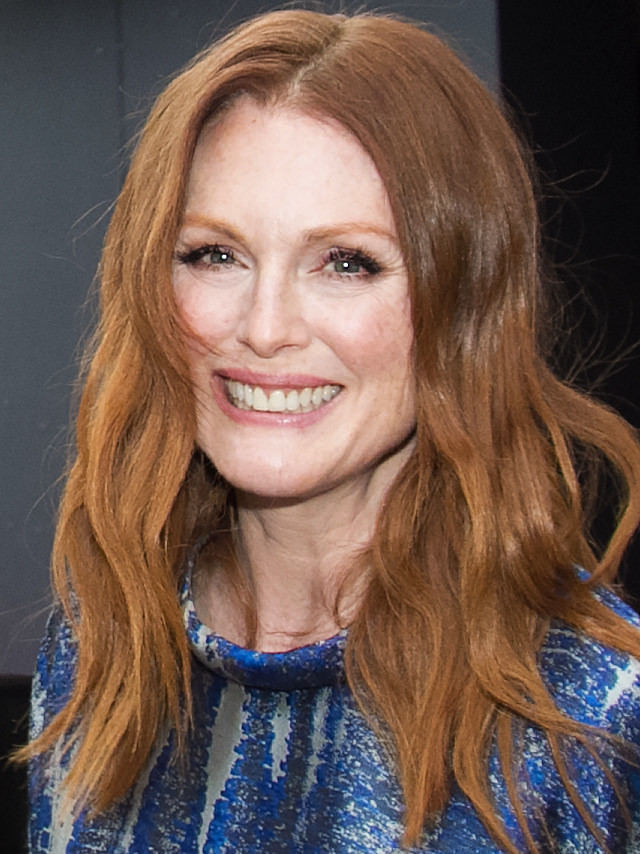
Julianne Moore, Best Actress winner

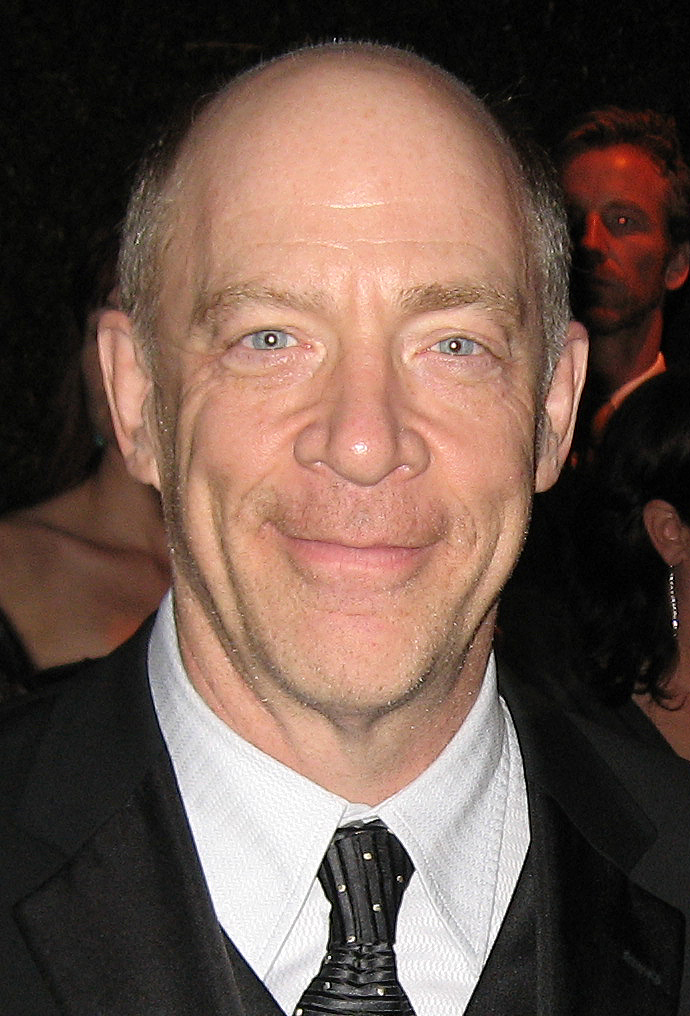
J. K. Simmons, Best Supporting Actor winner

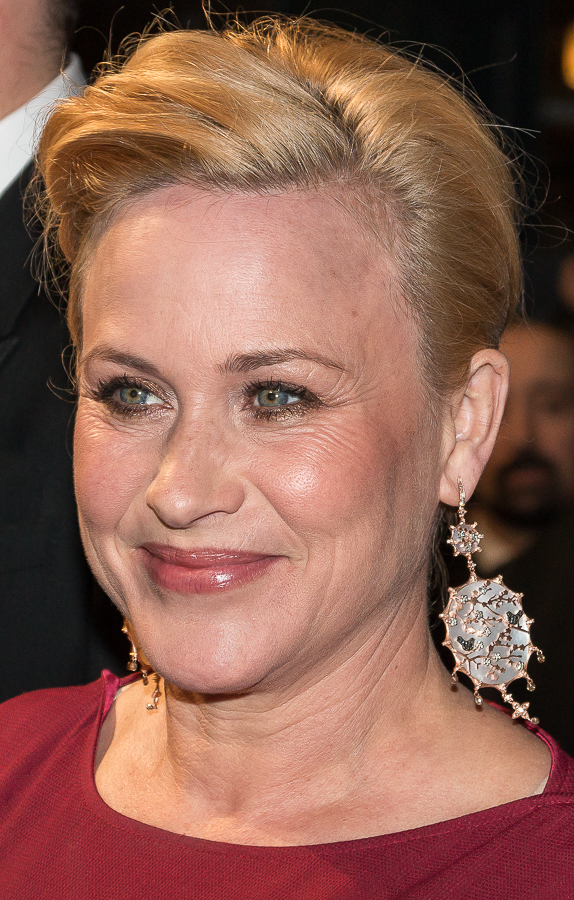
Patricia Arquette, Best Supporting Actress winner

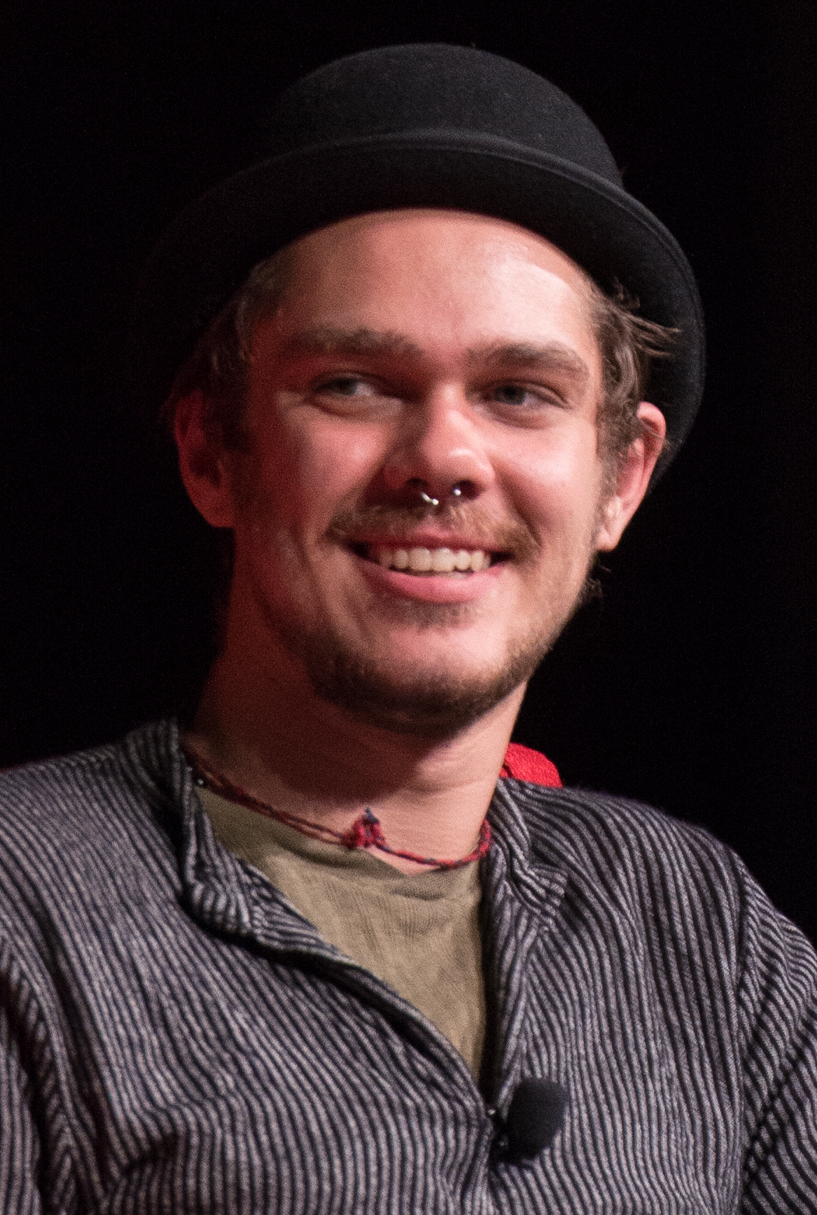
Ellar Coltrane, Best Young Actor/Actress winner

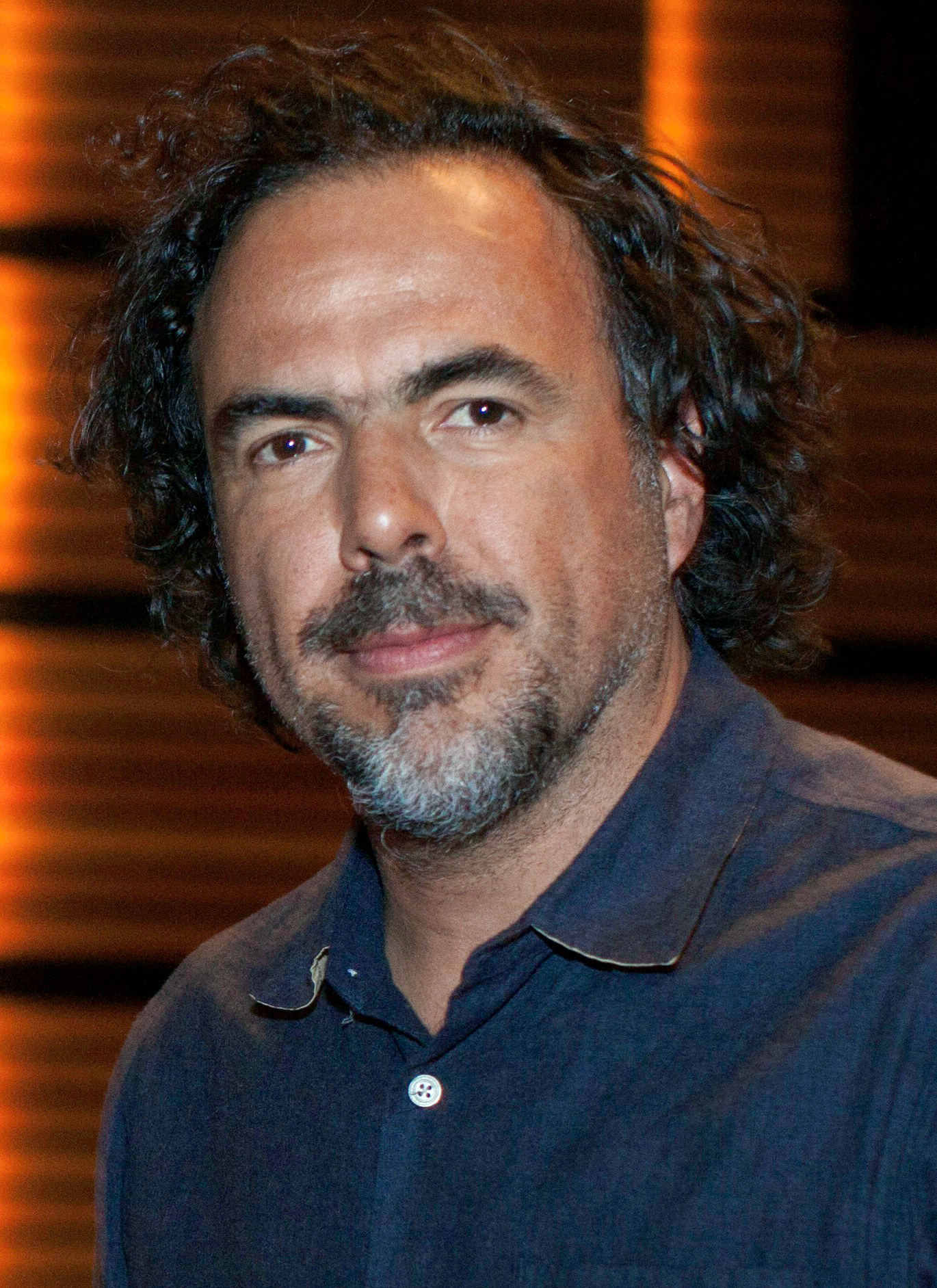
Alejandro G. Iñárritu, Best Original Screenplay co-winner

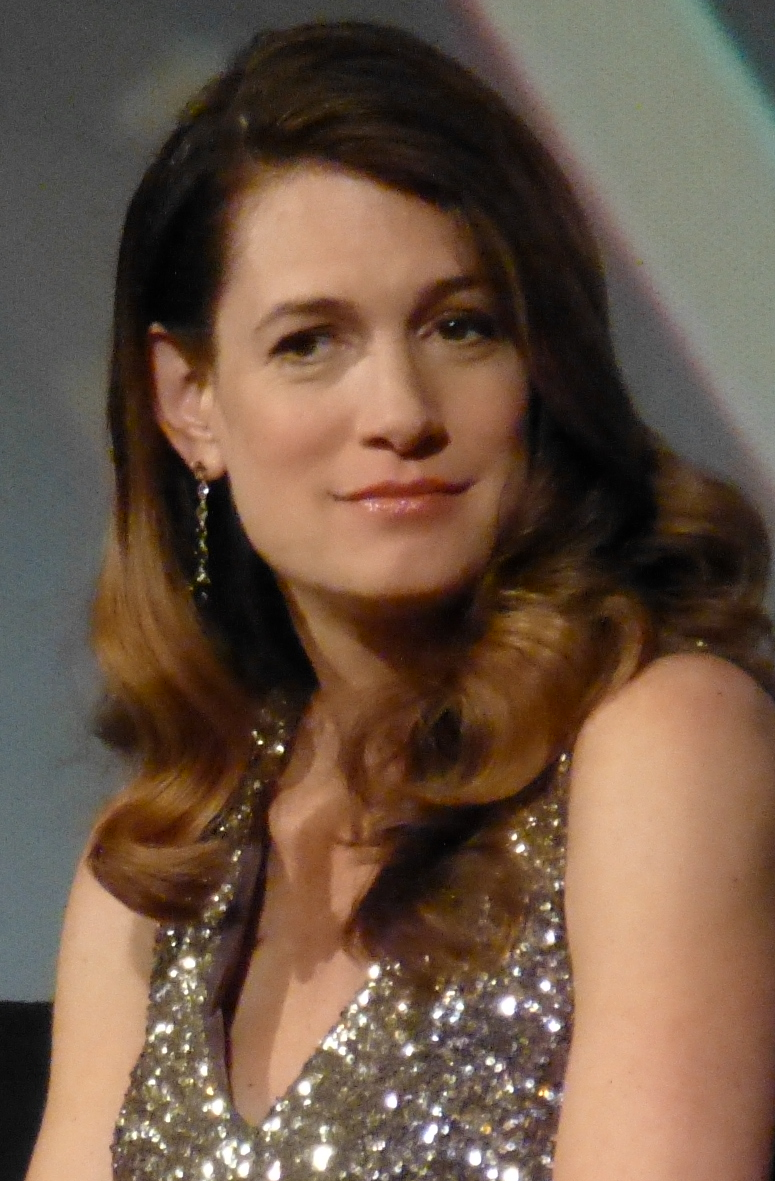
Gillian Flynn, Best Adapted Screenplay winner

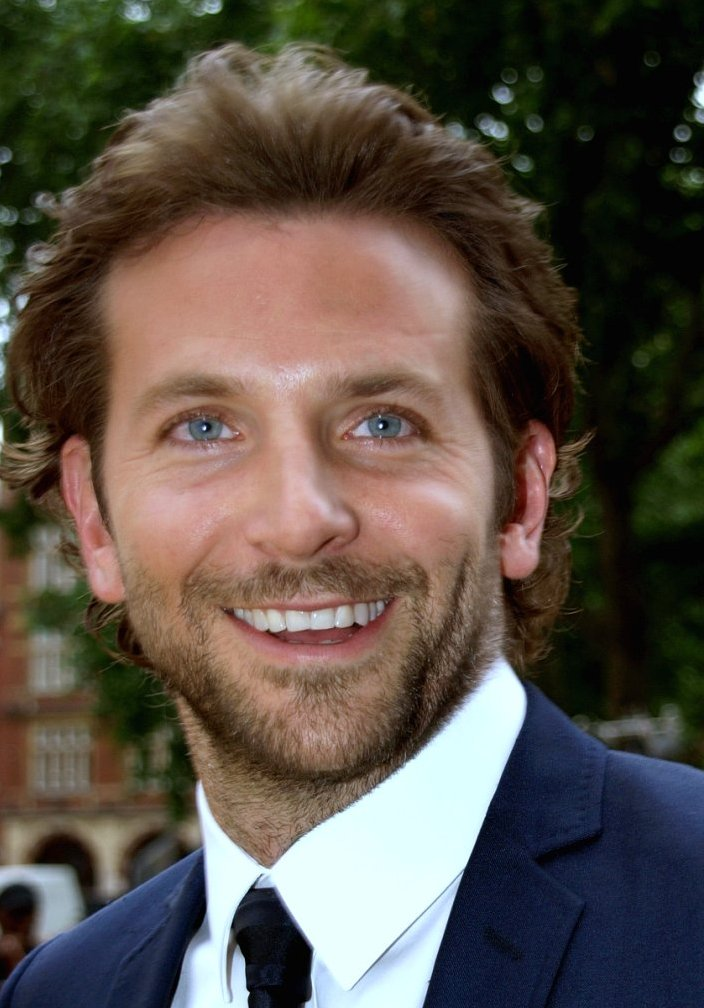
Bradley Cooper, Best Actor in an Action Movie winner

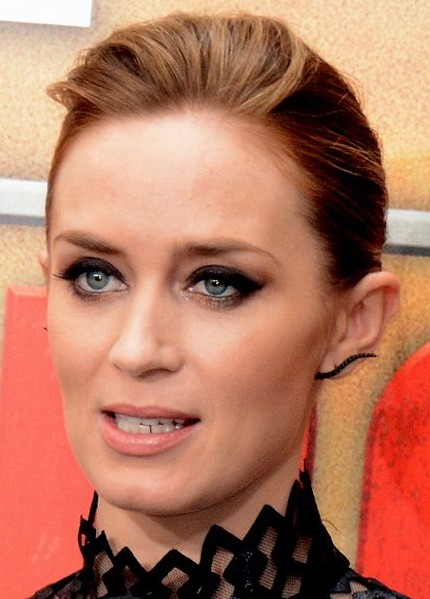
Emily Blunt, Best Actress in an Action Movie winner

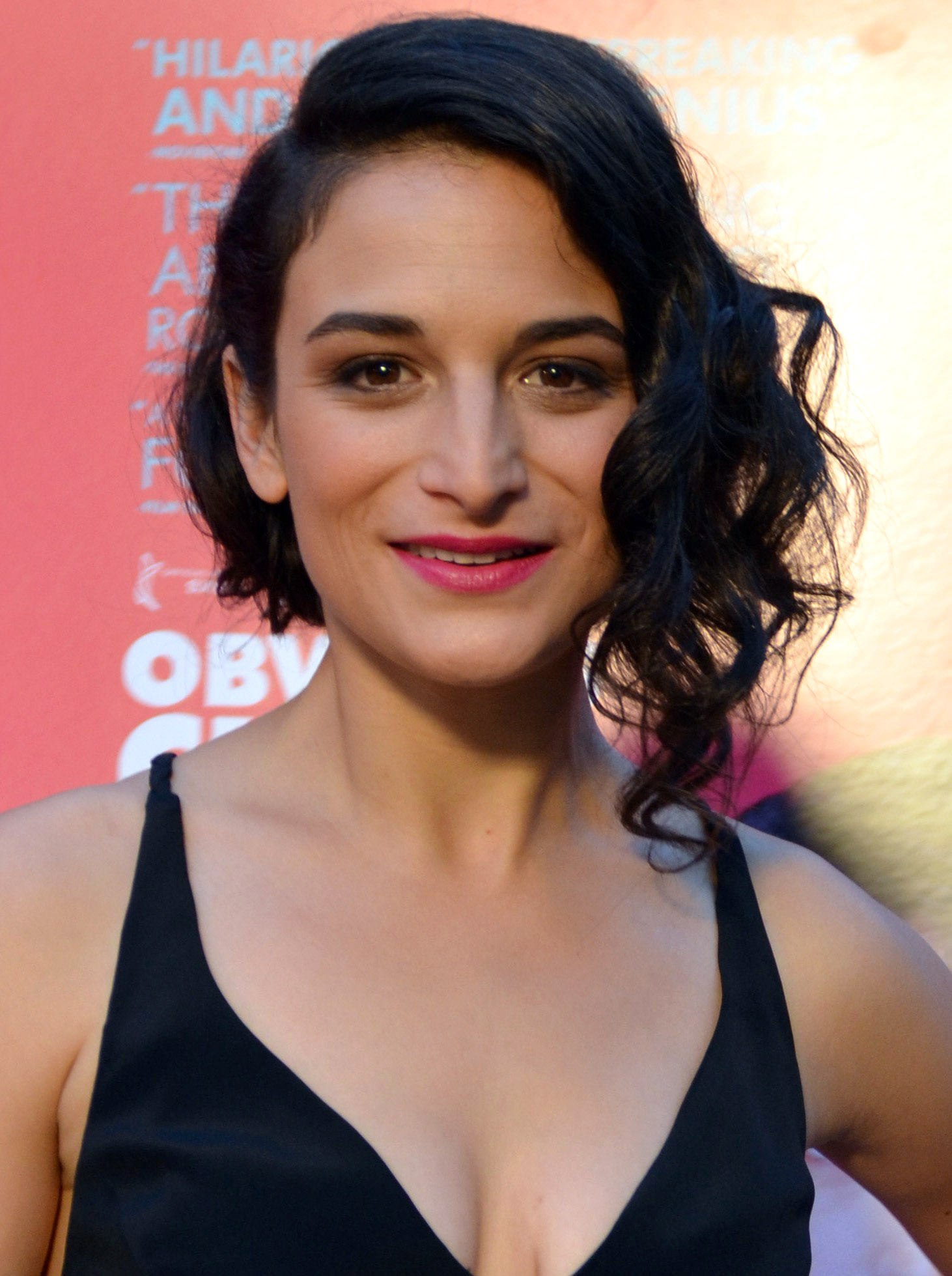
Jenny Slate, Best Actress in a Comedy Movie winner

Best Picture Boyhood: Birdman; Gone Girl; The Grand Budapest Hotel; The Imitation Game; Nightcrawler; Selma; The Theory of Everything; Unbroken; Whiplash	Best Director Richard Linklater – Boyhood: Wes Anderson – The Grand Budapest Hotel; Ava DuVernay – Selma; David Fincher – Gone Girl; Alejandro G. Iñárritu – Birdman; Angelina Jolie – Unbroken
Best Actor Michael Keaton – Birdman as Riggan Thomson: Benedict Cumberbatch – The Imitation Game as Alan Turing; Ralph Fiennes – The Grand Budapest Hotel as Monsieur Gustave H.; Jake Gyllenhaal – Nightcrawler as Louis "Lou" Bloom; David Oyelowo – Selma as Martin Luther King Jr.; Eddie Redmayne – The Theory of Everything as Stephen Hawking	Best Actress Julianne Moore – Still Alice as Dr. Alice Howland: Jennifer Aniston – Cake as Claire Bennett; Marion Cotillard – Two Days, One Night as Sandra Bya; Felicity Jones – The Theory of Everything as Jane Hawking; Rosamund Pike – Gone Girl as Amy Elliott Dunne; Reese Witherspoon – Wild as Cheryl Strayed
Best Supporting Actor J. K. Simmons – Whiplash as Terence Fletcher: Josh Brolin – Inherent Vice as Lt. Det. Christian F. "Bigfoot" Bjornsen; Robert Duvall – The Judge as Judge Joseph Palmer; Ethan Hawke – Boyhood as Mason Evans Sr.; Edward Norton – Birdman as Mike Shiner; Mark Ruffalo – Foxcatcher as Dave Schultz	Best Supporting Actress Patricia Arquette – Boyhood as Olivia Evans: Jessica Chastain – A Most Violent Year as Anna Morales; Keira Knightley – The Imitation Game as Joan Clarke; Emma Stone – Birdman as Sam Thomson; Meryl Streep – Into the Woods as The Witch; Tilda Swinton – Snowpiercer as Minister Mason
Best Young Actor/Actress Ellar Coltrane – Boyhood as Mason Evans Jr.: Ansel Elgort – The Fault in Our Stars as Augustus "Gus" Waters; Mackenzie Foy – Interstellar as Murphy "Murph" Cooper; Jaeden Lieberher – St. Vincent as Oliver Bronstein; Tony Revolori – The Grand Budapest Hotel as Zero Moustafa; Quvenzhané Wallis – Annie as Annie Bennett; Noah Wiseman – The Babadook as Samuel Vanek	Best Acting Ensemble Birdman: Boyhood; The Grand Budapest Hotel; The Imitation Game; Into the Woods; Selma
Best Original Screenplay Alejandro G. Iñárritu, Nicolás Giacobone, Alexander Dinelaris Jr., and Armando Bó – Birdman: Wes Anderson and Hugo Guinness – The Grand Budapest Hotel; Damien Chazelle – Whiplash; Dan Gilroy – Nightcrawler; Richard Linklater – Boyhood	Best Adapted Screenplay Gillian Flynn – Gone Girl: Paul Thomas Anderson – Inherent Vice; Joel Coen, Ethan Coen, Richard LaGravenese, and William Nicholson – Unbroken; Anthony McCarten – The Theory of Everything; Graham Moore – The Imitation Game; Nick Hornby – Wild
Best Animated Feature The Lego Movie: Big Hero 6; The Book of Life; The Boxtrolls; How to Train Your Dragon 2	Best Action Movie Guardians of the Galaxy: American Sniper; Captain America: The Winter Soldier; Edge of Tomorrow; Fury
Best Actor in an Action Movie Bradley Cooper – American Sniper as Chris Kyle: Tom Cruise – Edge of Tomorrow as Major William Cage; Chris Evans – Captain America: The Winter Soldier as Steve Rogers / Captain America; Brad Pitt – Fury as First Sergeant Don "Wardaddy" Collier; Chris Pratt – Guardians of the Galaxy as Peter Quill / Star-Lord	Best Actress in an Action Movie Emily Blunt – Edge of Tomorrow as Sergeant Rita Vrataski: Scarlett Johansson – Lucy as Lucy; Jennifer Lawrence – The Hunger Games: Mockingjay – Part 1 as Katniss Everdeen; Zoe Saldaña – Guardians of the Galaxy as Gamora; Shailene Woodley – Divergent as Beatrice "Tris" Prior
Best Documentary Feature Life Itself: Citizenfour; Glen Campbell: I'll Be Me; Jodorowsky's Dune; Last Days in Vietnam; The Overnighters	Best Comedy Movie The Grand Budapest Hotel: 22 Jump Street; Birdman; St. Vincent; Top Five
Best Actor in a Comedy Movie Michael Keaton – Birdman as Riggan Thomson: Jon Favreau – Chef as Carl Casper; Ralph Fiennes – The Grand Budapest Hotel as Monsieur Gustave H.; Bill Murray – St. Vincent as Vincent MacKenna; Chris Rock – Top Five as Andre Allen; Channing Tatum – 22 Jump Street as Greg Jenko	Best Actress in a Comedy Movie Jenny Slate – Obvious Child as Donna Stern: Rose Byrne – Neighbors as Kelly Radner; Rosario Dawson – Top Five as Chelsea Brown; Melissa McCarthy – St. Vincent as Maggie Bronstein; Kristen Wiig – The Skeleton Twins as Maggie Dean
Best Sci-Fi/Horror Movie Interstellar: The Babadook; Dawn of the Planet of the Apes; Snowpiercer; Under the Skin	Best Foreign Language Film Force Majeure (Turist) • France / Norway / Sweden: Ida • Denmark / France / Poland / UK; Leviathan (Leviafan) • Russia; Two Days, One Night (Deux jours, une nuit) • Belgium / France / Italy; Wild Tales (Relatos salvajes) • Argentina / Spain
Best Art Direction Adam Stockhausen (Production Designer), Anna Pinnock (Set Decorator) – The Grand Budapest Hotel: David Crank (Production Designer), Amy Wells (Set Decorator) – Inherent Vice; Nathan Crowley (Production Designer), Gary Fettis (Set Decorator) – Interstellar; Dennis Gassner (Production Designer), Anna Pinnock (Set Decorator) – Into the Woods; Ondřej Nekvasil (Production Designer), Beatrice Brentnerovà (Set Decorator) – Snowpiercer; Kevin Thompson (Production Designer), George DeTitta Jr. (Set Decorator) – Birdman	Best Cinematography Emmanuel Lubezki – Birdman: Roger Deakins – Unbroken; Dick Pope – Mr. Turner; Hoyte van Hoytema – Interstellar; Robert Yeoman – The Grand Budapest Hotel
Best Costume Design Milena Canonero – The Grand Budapest Hotel: Colleen Atwood – Into the Woods; Mark Bridges – Inherent Vice; Jacqueline Durran – Mr. Turner; Anna B. Sheppard – Maleficent	Best Editing Douglas Crise and Stephen Mirrione – Birdman: Sandra Adair – Boyhood; Kirk Baxter – Gone Girl; Tom Cross – Whiplash; Lee Smith – Interstellar
Best Score Antonio Sánchez – Birdman: Alexandre Desplat – The Imitation Game; Jóhann Jóhannsson – The Theory of Everything; Trent Reznor and Atticus Ross – Gone Girl; Hans Zimmer – Interstellar	Best Song "Glory" (Common and John Legend) – Selma: "Big Eyes" (Lana Del Rey) – Big Eyes; "Everything Is Awesome" (Jo Li and The Lonely Island) – The Lego Movie; "Lost Stars" (Keira Knightley) – Begin Again; "Yellow Flicker Beat" (Lorde) – The Hunger Games: Mockingjay – Part 1
Best Hair and Makeup Guardians of the Galaxy: Foxcatcher; The Hobbit: The Battle of the Five Armies; Into the Woods; Maleficent	Best Visual Effects Dawn of the Planet of the Apes: Edge of Tomorrow; Guardians of the Galaxy; The Hobbit: The Battle of the Five Armies; Interstellar

=== Louis XIII Genius Award ===
Ron Howard

=== Critics' Choice MVP Award ===
Jessica Chastain (for The Disappearance of Eleanor Rigby, Interstellar, Miss Julie, and A Most Violent Year)

=== Lifetime Achievement Award ===
Kevin Costner

== Films by multiple nominations and wins ==
The following thirty-two films received multiple nominations:

Nominations	Film
13	Birdman
11	The Grand Budapest Hotel
8	Boyhood
7	Interstellar
6	Gone Girl
6	The Imitation Game
5	Guardians of the Galaxy
5	Into the Woods
5	Selma
5	The Theory of Everything
4	Edge of Tomorrow
4	Inherent Vice
4	St. Vincent
4	Unbroken
4	Whiplash
3	Nightcrawler
3	Snowpiercer
3	Top Five
2	22 Jump Street
2	American Sniper
2	The Babadook
2	Captain America: The Winter Soldier
2	Dawn of the Planet of the Apes
2	Foxcatcher
2	Fury
2	The Hobbit: The Battle of the Five Armies
2	The Hunger Games: Mockingjay – Part 1
2	The Lego Movie
2	Maleficent
2	Mr. Turner
2	Two Days, One Night
2	Wild

The following four films received multiple awards:

Awards	Film
7	Birdman
4	Boyhood
3	The Grand Budapest Hotel
2	Guardians of the Galaxy
