= Thomas Curley (sound engineer) =

American sound mixer

- Born: May 16, 1976 (age 50); Troy, New York, United States
- Occupation: Production sound mixer
- Years active: 2002-present

Thomas Curley (born May 16, 1976) is an American production sound mixer. He has won a BAFTA and an Oscar in the category of Best Sound Mixing for Whiplash.

Thomas M. Curley was born in Troy, New York, and graduated from Shenendehowa High School in 1994. He graduated from the University at Buffalo, The State University of New York with a B.A. in Film Studies in 2001. Curley is a member of International Alliance of Theatrical Stage Employees Local 695 since 2003. In 2008, he was inducted into the Cinema Audio Society, and then the Academy of Motion Picture Arts and Sciences in 2015. He is currently a contributor to the entertainment website, Screen Radar, which offers film, television and streaming news and reviews, celebrity interviews and blogs.

== Selected filmography ==
- Current TV (2005–2007)
- D-War (2007)
- The Spectacular Now (2013)
- Whiplash (2014)
- Documentary Now! (2015)
- Once Upon a Time in Venice (2017)
- How to Be a Latin Lover (2017)
- Chappaquiddick (2017)
- A.X.L (2018)
- Yellowstone (2018–2020)
- A Million Little Pieces (2019)
- Queenpins (2021)
- The Gray Man (2022 film) (2022)
