= Whiplash (2014 film) =

2014 film by Damien Chazelle

- Theatrical release poster
- Directed by: Damien Chazelle
- Written by: Damien Chazelle
- Produced by: Jason Blum; Helen Estabrook; Michel Litvak; David Lancaster
- Starring: Miles Teller; J. K. Simmons; Paul Reiser
- Cinematography: Sharone Meir
- Edited by: Tom Cross
- Music by: Justin Hurwitz
- Production companies: Bold Films; Blumhouse Productions; Right of Way Films
- Distributed by: Sony Pictures Classics
- Release dates: January 16, 2014 (Sundance); October 10, 2014 (United States)
- Running time: 106 minutes
- Country: United States
- Language: English
- Budget: $3.3 million
- Box office: $50.4 million

Whiplash is a 2014 American psychological drama film written and directed by Damien Chazelle, and starring Miles Teller, J. K. Simmons, and Paul Reiser. It focuses on an ambitious music student and aspiring jazz drummer (Teller), who is pushed to his limit by his abusive instructor (Simmons).

The film was produced by Bold Films, Blumhouse Productions, and Right of Way Films. Sony Pictures acquired distribution rights for most of the world, releasing the film under Sony Pictures Classics in North America, Germany, and Australia, and Stage 6 Films in the UK, Scandinavia, Benelux, Eastern Europe (excluding the CIS), Greece, South Africa, Spain, Italy, Portugal and Latin America.

Chazelle completed the script in 2013, drawing upon his experiences in a "very competitive" jazz band in high school. Soon after, Right of Way and Blumhouse helped Chazelle turn fifteen pages of the screenplay into an 18-minute short film, Whiplash (2013). The short film received acclaim after debuting at the 2013 Sundance Film Festival, which attracted investors to produce the complete version of the script. Filming took place in September 2013 throughout Los Angeles over twenty days. The film explores concepts of perfectionism, dedication, and success, and deconstructs the concept of ambition.

Whiplash premiered in competition at the 2014 Sundance Film Festival on January 16, as the festival's opening film, where it won the Audience Award Dramatic and the Grand Jury Prize Dramatic. It opened in limited release domestically in the United States and Canada on October 10, 2014, gradually expanding to over 500 screens and finally closing on March 26, 2015. Whiplash received acclaim for its screenplay, direction, editing, sound mixing and Simmons’s performance. It grossed $50 million on a $3.3 million budget during its original theatrical run. Its accolades include Academy Awards for Best Film Editing and Best Sound Mixing, and it was nominated for Best Picture and Best Adapted Screenplay. Simmons won the Academy, Golden Globe, BAFTA, Critics' Choice, and Screen Actors Guild awards for Best Supporting Actor. Whiplash has since been assessed as one of the best films of the 21st century.

== Plot ==
Nineteen-year-old jazz drummer Andrew Neiman attends the prestigious Shaffer Conservatory in New York City. Terence Fletcher, the conductor of Shaffer's most prestigious ensemble, overhears Andrew practicing and prompts him to play rudiments and a double-time swing beat. Apparently unimpressed, Fletcher leaves, but later recruits him to perform in his ensemble as a backup for the core drummer, Carl Tanner. On his first day in Fletcher's class, Andrew quickly discovers that Fletcher is relentlessly strict and abuses students verbally, physically, and psychologically. When Andrew apparently fails to keep tempo on Hank Levy's "Whiplash" during his first ensemble rehearsal, Fletcher throws a chair at him, repeatedly slaps his face, and berates him. Determined to impress Fletcher, Andrew excessively practices, often until his hands bleed.

After their first set at a jazz competition, Andrew misplaces Tanner's sheet music. Tanner cannot play without the sheets, yet Andrew professes that he memorized the music. Fletcher allows Andrew to perform in his stead; Shaffer wins the competition. Fletcher promotes Andrew to core drummer, but abruptly reassigns the position to Ryan Connolly, a drummer from Andrew's previous ensemble within Shaffer. Andrew's single-mindedness toward music leads to him clashing with his family and breaking up with his girlfriend Nicole. One day, Fletcher begins rehearsal by announcing that Sean Casey, a former member of the Studio Band, has died in a car crash. He then pushes the three drummers to play at a faster tempo on "Caravan", keeping them for a grueling five-hour practice. Andrew earns the core position back after he is the only one able to perform on tempo.

Andrew's bus gets a flat tire on his way to the next competition. He rents a car, but arrives late and forgets his drumsticks at the rental office. Andrew races back and retrieves them, but his car is hit by a truck on the way back. An injured Andrew runs to the theater, arriving bloodied and weak as the ensemble enters the stage. He struggles to keep tempo and Fletcher halts the performance to dismiss him. Enraged, Andrew attacks Fletcher onstage and is expelled from Shaffer.

At the request of his father Jim, Andrew meets a lawyer representing Casey's parents, who explain that Casey did not die in a traffic accident, but actually hanged himself after suffering from depression and anxiety inflicted by Fletcher's abuse; his parents want Fletcher held accountable. Andrew agrees to anonymously testify against Fletcher.

Months later, Andrew, having abandoned drumming altogether, encounters Fletcher playing piano at a jazz club. They have a conversation over drinks, during which Fletcher reveals that he was let go from Shaffer following complaints about his conduct. Though he admits his methods were harsh, he also insists they were necessary to motivate students. He cites a story where Jo Jones allegedly threw a cymbal at Charlie Parker, arguing that the next transformative jazz musician would never let themself be discouraged. Fletcher invites Andrew to perform with his professional band at a New York JVC Jazz Festival, playing the same pieces from Shaffer; Andrew accepts. He calls Nicole to invite her to the event, but learns she has a new boyfriend.

At the festival, Fletcher reveals to Andrew that he knows Andrew testified against him; as revenge, he leads the band into Tim Simonec's "Upswingin'", a song that Andrew does not know nor have the sheet music to. After a disastrous performance, a humiliated Andrew walks offstage. After Jim embraces him, Andrew returns to the stage, reclaims the drum kit, and cuts off Fletcher by cueing the band into "Caravan". Fletcher, though angered, resumes conducting. Towards the end of "Caravan", Andrew improvises a lengthy solo. Fletcher nods in approval before cueing the final chord.

== Cast ==
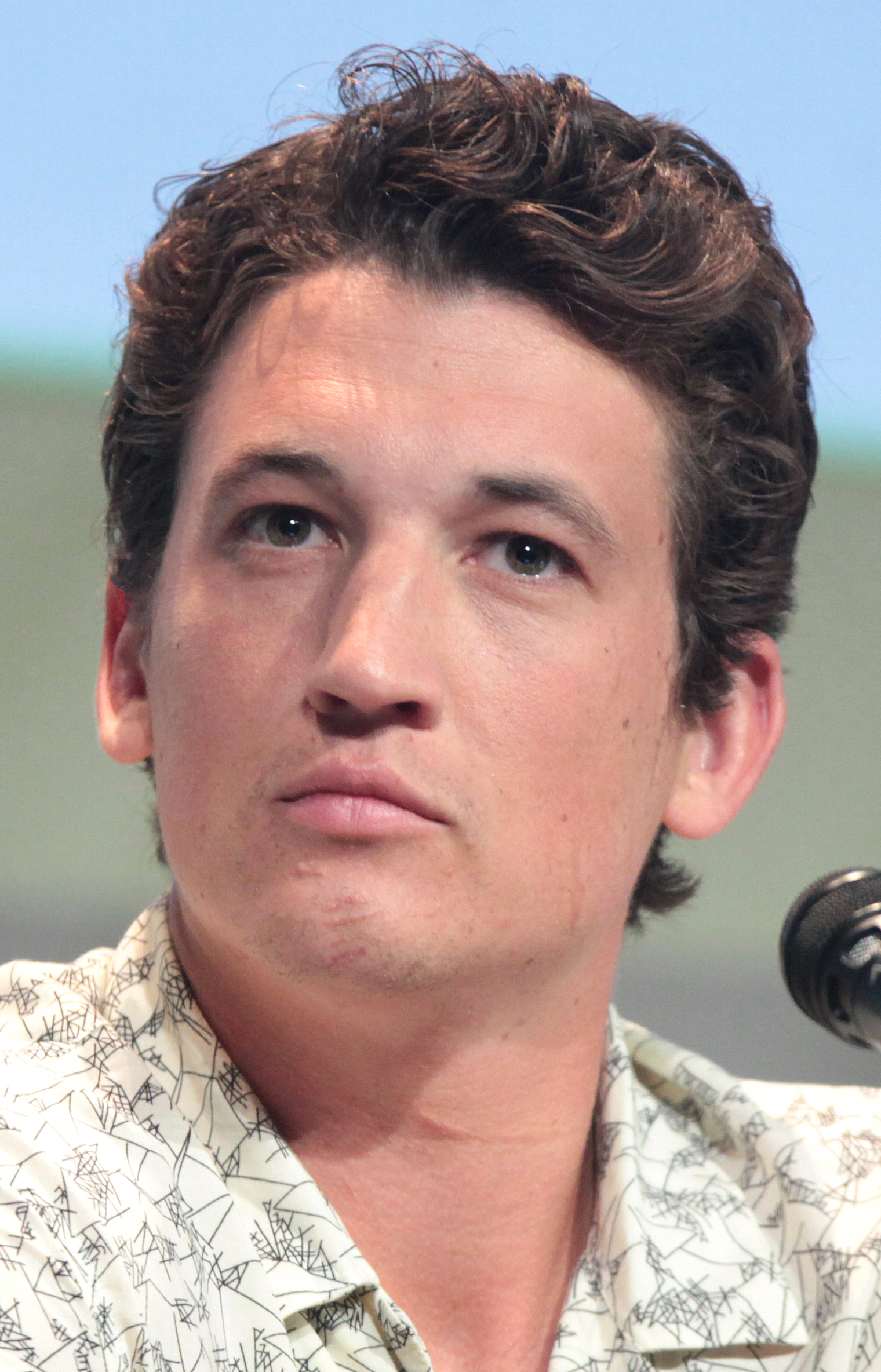
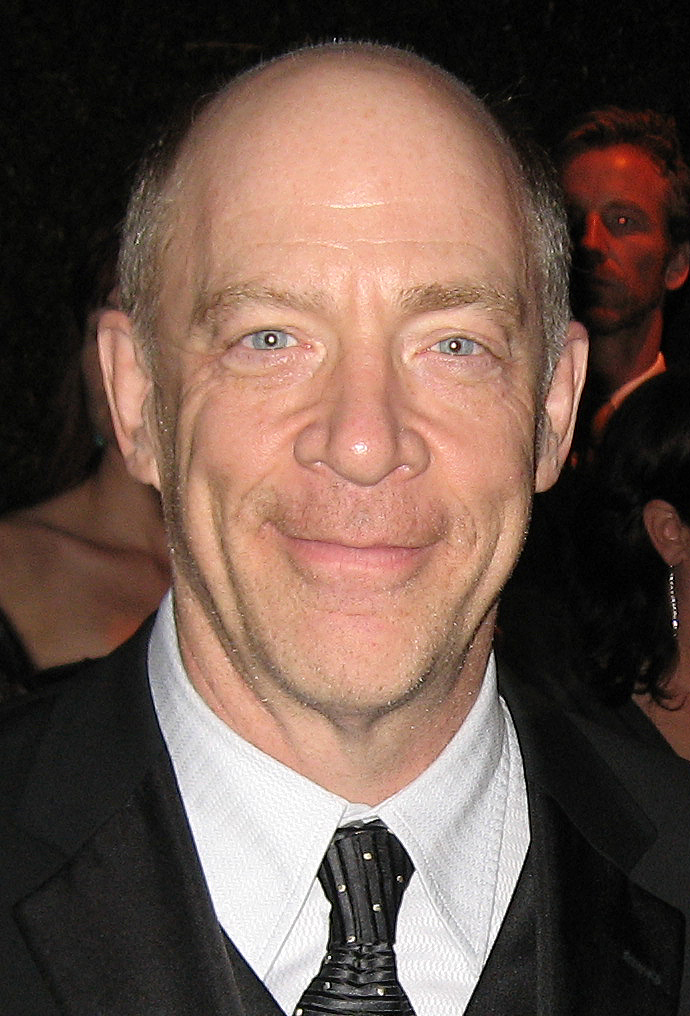
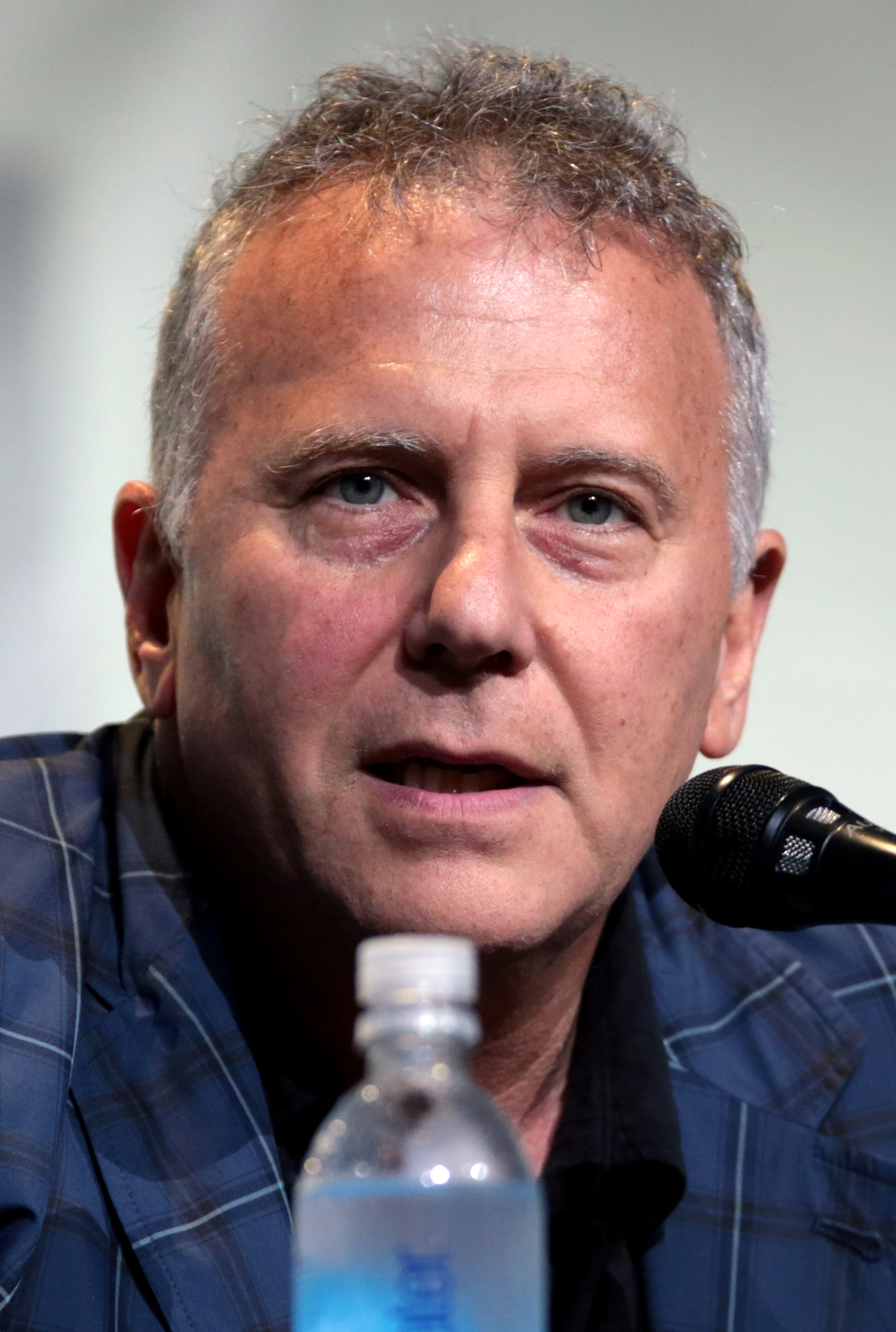
The film stars Miles Teller (left), J. K. Simmons (middle), and Paul Reiser (right).
- Miles Teller as Andrew Neiman, an ambitious 19-year-old jazz drummer
  - Sam Campisi as an 8-year-old Andrew Neiman
- J. K. Simmons as Terence Fletcher, Andrew's jazz instructor
- Paul Reiser as Jim Neiman, Andrew's father
- Melissa Benoist as Nicole, Andrew's girlfriend
- Austin Stowell as Ryan Connolly, Andrew's classmate and fellow drummer
- Nate Lang as Carl Tanner, Andrew's classmate and fellow drummer
- Chris Mulkey as Frank Neiman, Andrew's uncle and Jim's brother
- Damon Gupton as Mr. Kramer, Andrew's first instructor
- Michael D. Cohen as Stagehand Overbrook
- April Grace as Rachel Bornholdt, Andrew's and Jim's lawyer

== Production ==
=== Development ===
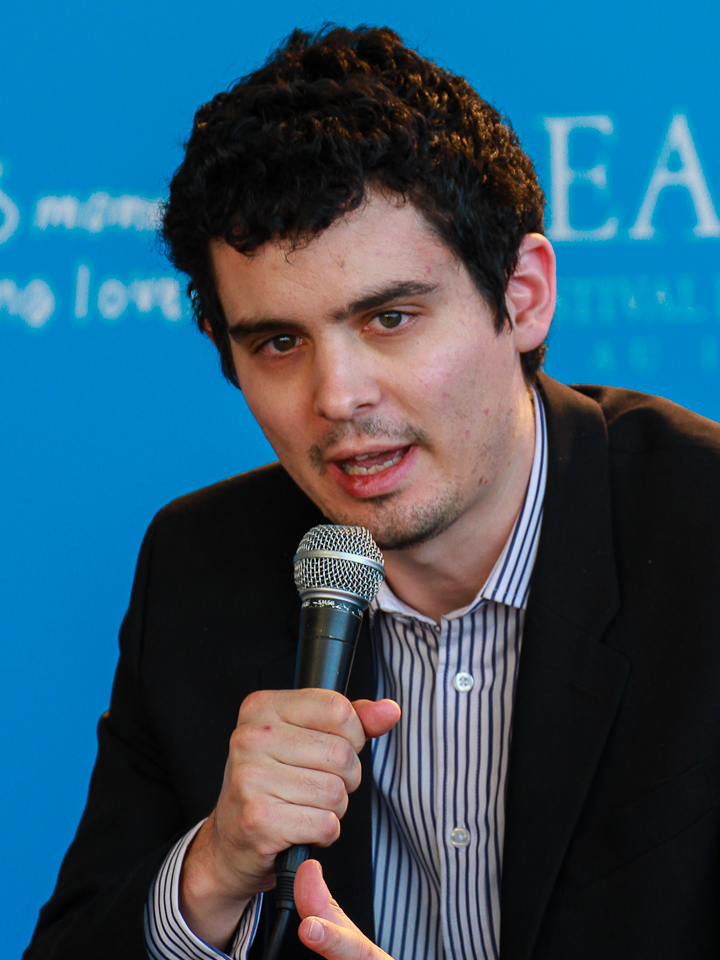
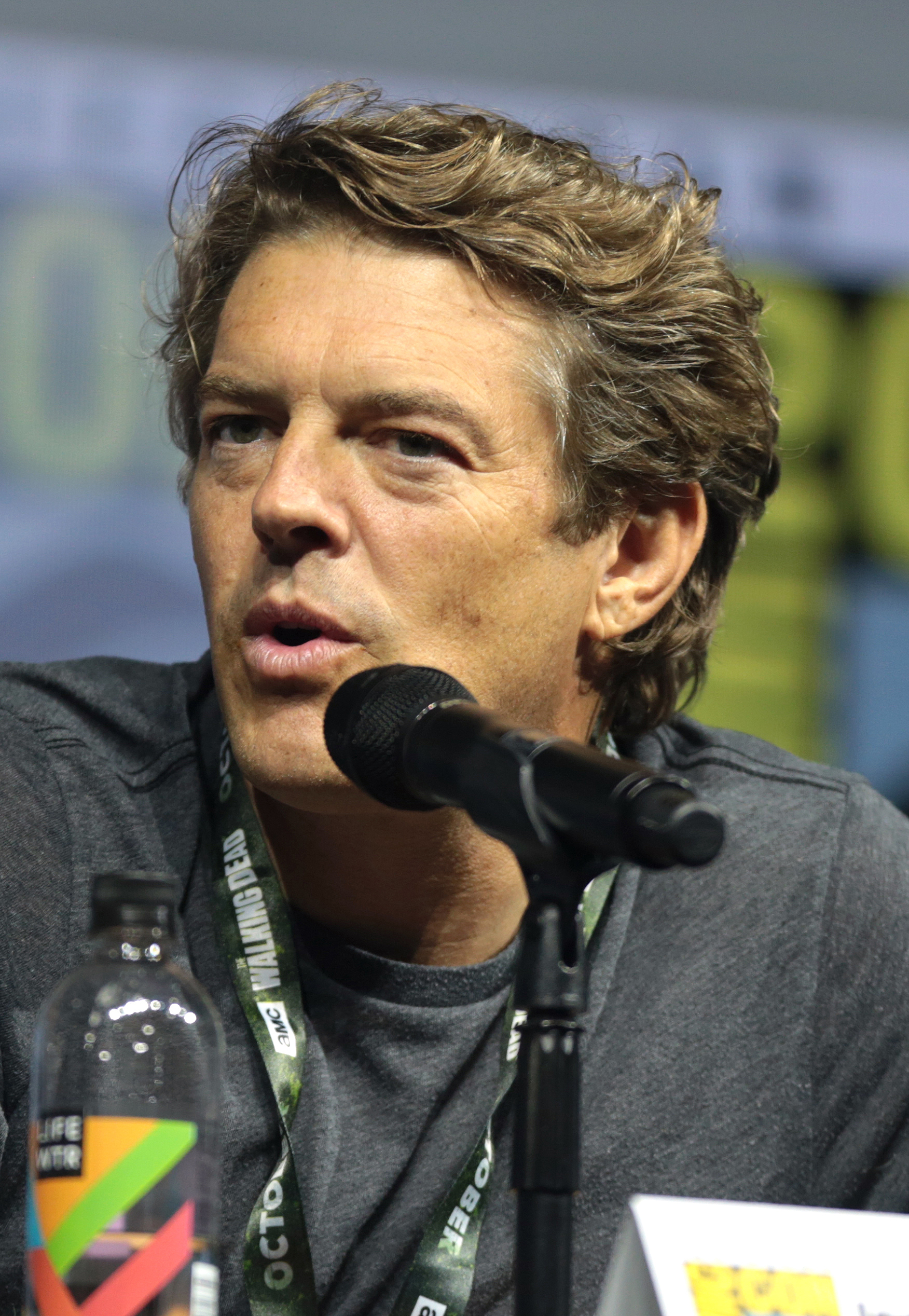
Writer-director Damien Chazelle and producer Jason Blum

While attending Princeton High School, writer-director Damien Chazelle was in a "very competitive" studio band and drew on the dread he felt in those years. He based the conductor, Terence Fletcher, on his former band instructor (who died in 2003) but "pushed it further", adding elements of Buddy Rich and other band leaders known for their harsh treatment. Chazelle wrote the film "initially in frustration" while trying to get his musical La La Land off the ground.

Right of Way Films and Blumhouse Productions helped Chazelle turn fifteen pages of his original screenplay into a short film, Whiplash (2013), starring Johnny Simmons as Neiman and J. K. Simmons (no relation) as Fletcher. The eighteen-minute short film received acclaim after debuting at the 2013 Sundance Film Festival, winning the short film Jury Award for fiction, which attracted investors to produce the complete version of the script. The feature-length film was financed for $3.3 million by Bold Films.

In August 2013, Miles Teller signed on to star in the role originated by Johnny Simmons; J. K. Simmons remained attached to his original role. Early on, Chazelle gave J. K. Simmons direction that "I want you to take it past what you think the normal limit would be," telling him: "I don't want to see a human being on-screen any more. I want to see a monster, a gargoyle, an animal." Many of the band members were real musicians or music students, and Chazelle tried to capture their expressions of fear and anxiety when Simmons pressed them. Chazelle said that, between takes, Simmons was "as sweet as can be", which he credits for keeping "the shoot from being nightmarish".

=== Filming ===
Principal photography began in September 2013, with filming taking place throughout Los Angeles, including the Hotel Barclay, Palace Theater, and the Orpheum Theatre. Whiplash was shot in nineteen days, with a schedule of fourteen hours of filming per day. Chazelle was involved in a serious car accident in the third week of filming and was hospitalized with possible concussion, but he returned to set the following day to wrap the shoot on time.

Having taught himself to play drums at age fifteen, Teller performed much of the drumming. Supporting actor and jazz drummer Nate Lang, who plays Neiman's rival Carl, trained Teller in the specifics of jazz drumming; this included changing his grip from matched to traditional. For certain scenes, professional drummer Kyle Crane served as Teller's drum double.

== Music ==
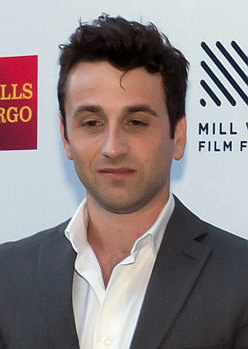
Composer Justin Hurwitz

The soundtrack album was released on October 7, 2014, via the Varèse Sarabande label. The soundtrack consists of 24 tracks divided into jazz pieces and underscore parts written for the film and classic jazz standards written by Stan Getz, Duke Ellington, and other musicians. The actual drummer was Bernie Dresel.

On March 27, 2020, an expanded deluxe edition was released on double CD and 2-LP gatefold sleeve vinyl with new cover art, featuring a bonus track, "Fletcher's Song", and a "Caravan" remix by Timo Garcia.

== Reception ==
=== Box office ===
In North America, Whiplash opened in a limited release on October 10, 2014, in six theaters, grossing $135,388 ($22,565 per theater) and finishing 34th at the box office. It expanded to 88 locations, then 419 locations. After three months on release, it had earned $7 million, and finally expanded nationwide to 1000 locations to capitalize on receiving five Academy Awards nominations. As of October 3, 2024, Whiplash grossed $14 million in the U.S. and Canada and $36.3 million in other territories, for a worldwide total of $50.4 million against a budget of $3.3 million.

=== Critical response ===
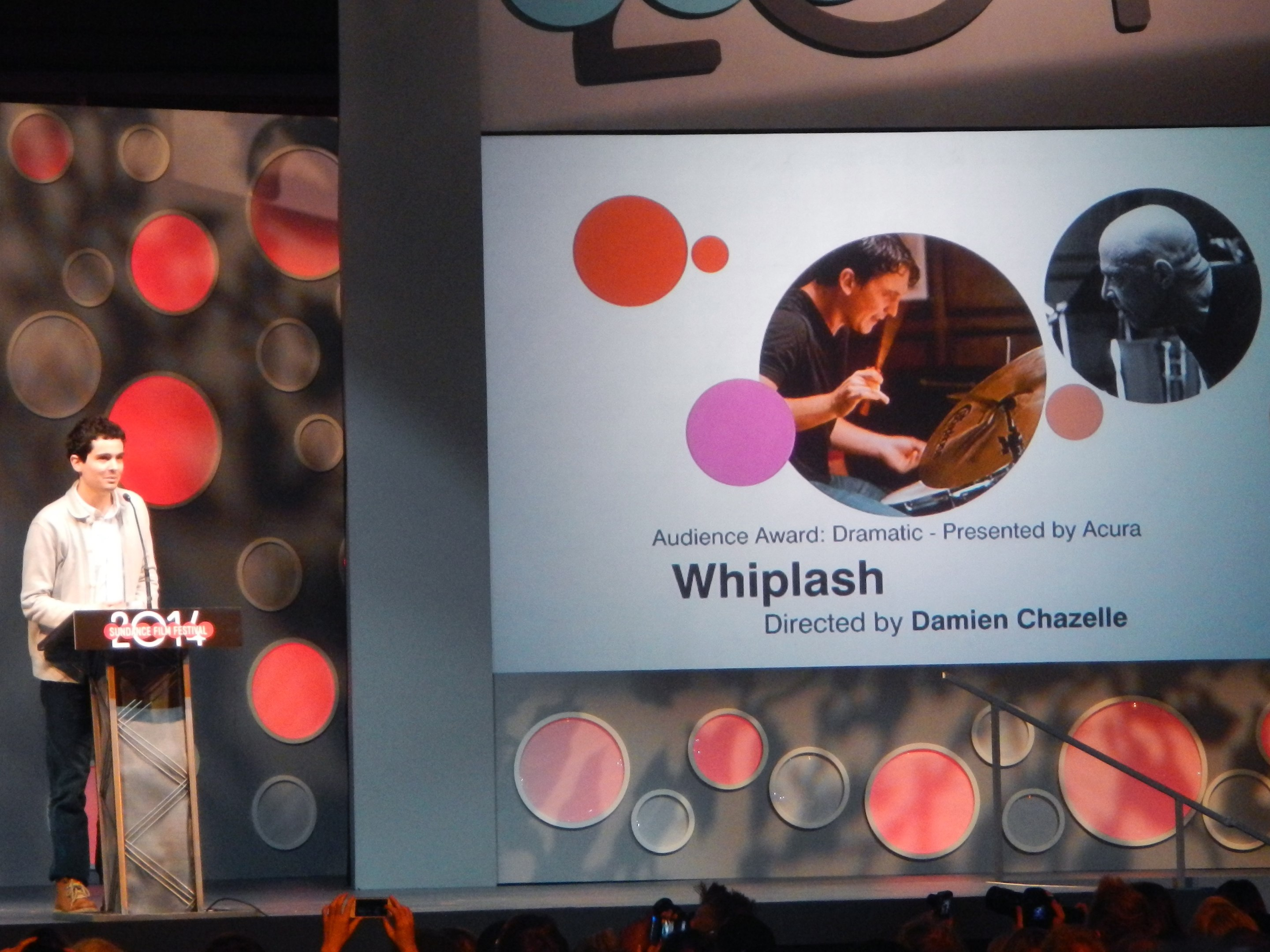
Director Damien Chazelle at the 2014 Sundance Film Festival

On the review aggregation website Rotten Tomatoes, Whiplash scored 94% based on 304 reviews, with an average rating of 8.6/10. The site's critical consensus states, "Intense, inspiring, and well-acted, Whiplash is a brilliant sophomore effort from director Damien Chazelle and a riveting vehicle for stars J. K. Simmons and Miles Teller." On Metacritic, it has a score of 89 out of 100, based on reviews from 49 critics, indicating "universal acclaim". Simmons received wide praise for his performance and won the 2015 Academy Award for Best Supporting Actor.

Peter Debruge, in his review for Variety, said Whiplash "demolishes the cliches of the musical-prodigy genre, investing the traditionally polite stages and rehearsal studios of a topnotch conservatory with all the psychological intensity of a battlefield or sports arena." Todd McCarthy of The Hollywood Reporter praised the performances of Teller and Simmons, writing: "Teller, who greatly impressed in last year's Sundance entry The Spectacular Now, does so again in a performance that is more often simmering than volatile ... Simmons has the great good fortune for a character actor to have here found a co-lead part he can really run with, which is what he excitingly does with a man who is profane, way out of bounds and, like many a good villain, utterly compelling." Whiplash also won the 87th Academy Award for Best Sound Mixing and the 87th Academy Award for Best Film Editing.

Amber Wilkinson of The Daily Telegraph praised the direction and editing, writing: "Chazelle's film has a sharp and gripping rhythm, with shots beautifully edited by Tom Cross... often cutting to the crash of Andrew's drums." James Rocchi of IndieWire wrote: "Whiplash is [...] full of bravado and swagger, uncompromising where it needs to be, informed by great performances and patient with both its characters and the things that matter to them." Henry Barnes of The Guardian called it a rare film "about music that professes its love for the music and its characters equally." Forrest Wickman of Slate said Whiplash distorted jazz history and promoted a misleading idea of genius, adding, "In all likelihood, Fletcher isn't making a Charlie Parker. He's making the kind of musician that would throw a cymbal at him." In The New Yorker, Richard Brody said, "Whiplash honors neither jazz nor cinema."

=== Top ten lists ===
Whiplash appeared on many critics' end-of-year lists. Metacritic collected lists published by major film critics and publications and in their analysis, recorded that it appeared on 57 lists and in 1st place on 5 of those lists. It was ranked the fifth best-reviewed film of the year by Metacritic.

- 1st – Haleigh Foutch, Collider
- 1st – William Bibbiani, CraveOnline
- 1st – Chris Nashawaty, Entertainment Weekly
- 1st – Erik Davis, Movies.com
- 2nd – A. A. Dowd, The A.V. Club
- 2nd – Scott Feinberg, The Hollywood Reporter
- 2nd – Mara Reinstein, Us Weekly
- 3rd – Tasha Robinson, The Dissolve
- 3rd – Amy Taubin, Artforum
- 3rd – Steve Persall, Tampa Bay Times
- 3rd – Matt Singer, ScreenCrush
- 3rd – Rob Hunter, Film School Rejects
- 4th – Ignatiy Vishnevetsky, The A.V. Club
- 4th – Perri Nemiroff, Collider
- 4th – Catherine Shoard, The Guardian
- 4th – Kyle Smith, New York Post
- 4th – Peter Hartlaub, SFGate
- 4th – Brian Miller, Seattle Weekly
- 4th – Michael Phillips, Chicago Tribune
- 4th – David Edelstein, Vulture
- 5th – Bill Goodykoontz, The Arizona Republic
- 5th – Ty Burr, The Boston Globe
- 5th – Genevieve Koski, The Dissolve
- 5th – James Berardinelli, Reelviews
- 5th – David Ansen, The Village Voice
- 5th – Betsy Sharkey, Los Angeles Times (tied with Foxcatcher)
- 6th – Peter Travers, Rolling Stone
- 6th – Richard Roeper, Chicago Sun-Times
- 6th – Joe Neumaier, New York Daily News
- 7th – Jesse Hassenger, The A.V. Club
- 7th – Rex Reed, New York Observer
- 7th – Noel Murray, The Dissolve
- 7th – Jocelyn Noveck, Associated Press
- 7th – Wesley Morris, Grantland
- 7th – Alison Willmore, BuzzFeed
- 8th – Keith Phipps, The Dissolve
- 8th – Mike Scott, The Times-Picayune
- 8th – Rafer Guzman, Newsday
- 8th – Ben Kenigsberg, The A.V. Club
- 8th – Barbara Vancheri, Pittsburgh Post-Gazette
- 8th – Kristopher Tapley, Hitfix
- 8th – Matthew Jacobs and Christopher Rosen, HuffPost
- 9th – Nathan Rabin, The Dissolve
- 10th – Owen Gleiberman, BBC
- Top 10 (listed alphabetically, not ranked) – Carrie Rickey
- Top 10 (listed alphabetically, not ranked) – Claudia Puig, USA Today
- Top 10 (listed alphabetically, not ranked) – Stephen Whitty, The Star-Ledger

=== Accolades ===
Whiplash received the top audience and grand jury awards in the U.S. dramatic competition at the 2014 Sundance Film Festival; Chazelle's short film won the jury award in the U.S. fiction category in the 2013 festival. Whiplash also took the grand prize and the audience award for its favorite film at the 40th Deauville American Film Festival.

Whiplash was originally planned to compete for the Academy Award for Best Original Screenplay, but on January 6, 2015, the Academy of Motion Picture Arts and Sciences (AMPAS) announced that it would instead compete in the Adapted Screenplay category to the surprise of many including Chazelle, due to the short film premiering at the 2013 Sundance Film Festival (one year before the feature film's release), even though the feature film's script was written first and the short was made to attract investors into producing the feature-length film. Although the Writers Guild of America categorized the screenplay as original, AMPAS classed it as an adaptation of the 2013 short version.

At the 87th Academy Awards, J. K. Simmons received the Academy Award for Best Supporting Actor for his performance, Tom Cross won the Academy Award for Best Film Editing while Craig Mann, Ben Wilkins, and Thomas Curley won the Academy Award for Best Sound Mixing. In December 2015, the score received a Grammy nomination, and Whiplash was nominated for the NME Award for Best Film.

== Legacy ==
In 2020, it ranked 13 on Empire's list of "The 100 Greatest Movies Of The 21st Century" and number 51 on its 2024 list. In 2021, members of Writers Guild of America West (WGAW) and Writers Guild of America, East (WGAE) ranked its screenplay 32nd in WGA's 101 Greatest Screenplays of the 21st Century (so far). In 2024, it topped the list of the Sundance Film Festival's Top 10 Films of All Time as the result of a survey conducted with 500 filmmakers and critics in honor of the festival's 40th anniversary. Actors Danielle Brooks, Katie McGrath, and Tramell Tillman praised the film, with McGrath saying "There isn't one needless second in this film...every frame is perfect." For its 10th anniversary, a new 4K remaster of Whiplash was released theatrically on September 20, 2024, following a special anniversary screening at the 2024 Toronto International Film Festival on September 9.

In June 2025, Tom Bernard, co-President of Sony Pictures Classics, cited Whiplash as among the best films to come from the studio in the 21st century. It also ranked number 60 on The New York Times' list of "The 100 Best Movies of the 21st Century" and number 19 on the "Readers' Choice" edition of the list.

Awards
Preceded by Fruitvale Station	Sundance Grand Jury Prize: U.S. Dramatic; 2014	Succeeded by Me and Earl and the Dying Girl
