= List of accolades received by Birdman (film) =

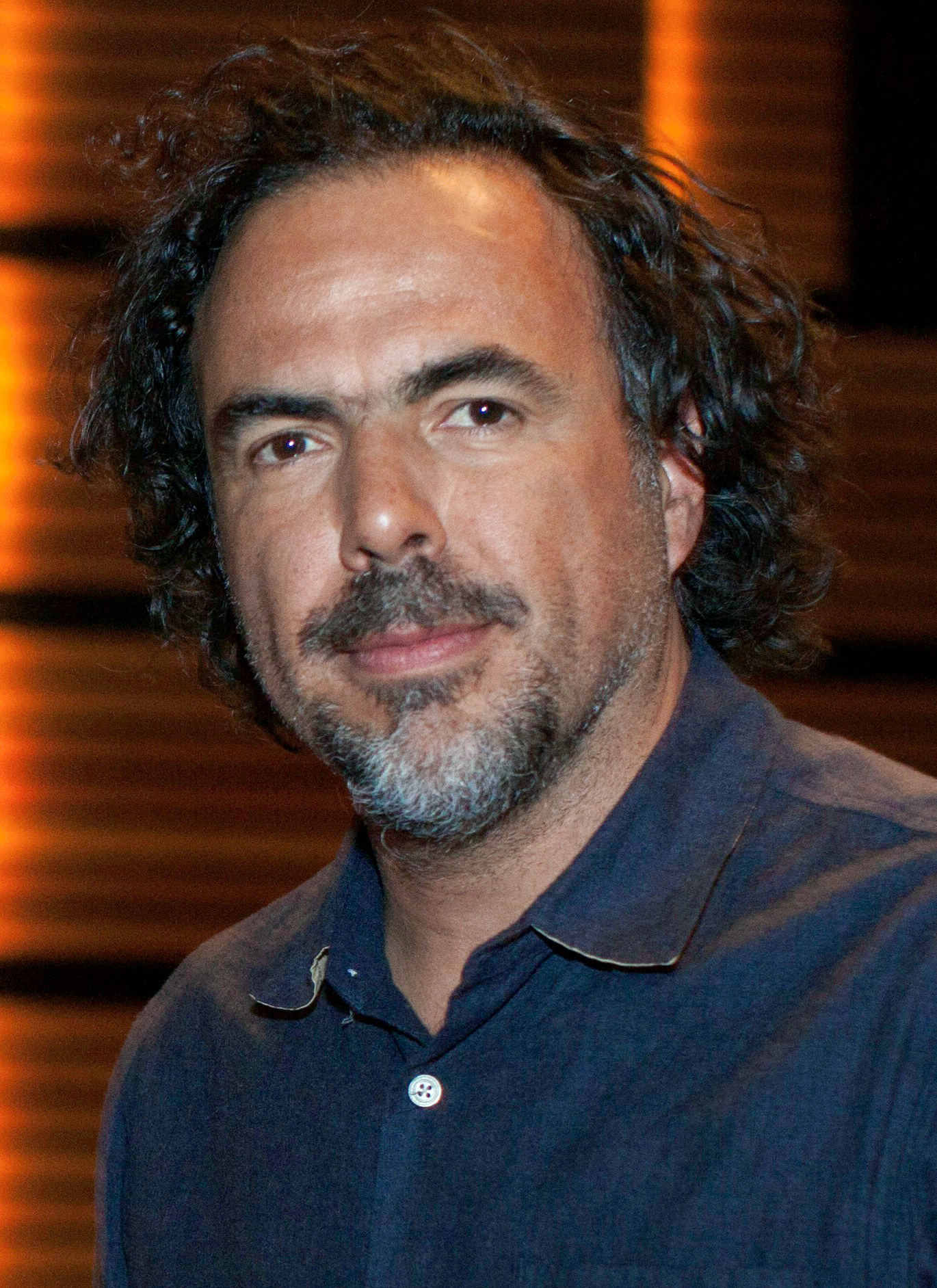
- Alejandro G. Iñárritu received many awards for his work on the film
Accolades
Award	Won	Nominated
AACTA International Awards	4	6
Academy Awards	4	9
ACE Eddie Awards	0	1
African-American Film Critics Association	0	1	4th Place
Alliance of Women Film Journalists	6	10
American Film Institute	1	1
American Society of Cinematographers	1	1
Art Directors Guild	1	1
Austin Film Critics Association	2	3	4th Place
BAFTA Awards	1	10
Boston Society of Film Critics	4	4
Casting Society of America	0	1
César Awards	1	1
Chicago Film Critics Association	2	9
Chicago International Film Festival	1	1
Cinema Audio Society Awards	0	1
Costume Designers Guild	1	1
Critics' Choice Movie Awards	7	13
Dallas–Fort Worth Film Critics Association	4	6	2nd Place (2)
David di Donatello Awards	1	1
Detroit Film Critics Society	2	7
Directors Guild of America Awards	1	1
Florida Film Critics Circle	2	8	2nd Place
Golden Globe Awards	2	7
Gotham Independent Film Awards	2	2
Houston Film Critics Society	1	10
Independent Spirit Awards	3	6
London Film Critics' Circle	1	7
Los Angeles Film Critics Association	1	4	2nd Place (3)
National Board of Review	3	3
New York Film Critics Online	4	4
Online Film Critics Society	3	4
Producers Guild of America Awards	1	1
San Diego Film Critics Society	1	8
San Francisco Bay Area Film Critics Circle	3	9
Satellite Awards	3	10
Saturn Awards	0	4
Screen Actors Guild Awards	1	4
St. Louis Film Critics Association	4	10
Toronto Film Critics Association	0	1	Runner-up
Vancouver Film Critics Circle	1	5
Venice Film Festival	4	5
Washington D.C. Area Film Critics Association	5	11
- Total number of awards and nominations (Note: Certain award groups do not simply award one winner, as they may recognize several recipients and have runners-up. Since this is a specific recognition and is different from losing an award, runner-up mentions are considered wins in the awards tally.) (Note: Awards in certain categories do not have prior nominations and only winners are announced by the jury. For simplification and to avoid errors, each award in this list has been presumed to have had a prior nomination.) (Note: Organizations without a Wikipedia page are not included in list of accolades.)
Totals	105	222		
- References

Birdman or (The Unexpected Virtue of Ignorance) is a 2014 American black comedy-drama film co-written, co-produced, and directed by Alejandro G. Iñárritu, released on October 17, 2014 in the United States. In addition to its competitive awards, the American Film Institute selected it as one of the Top 11 Films of 2014.

== Accolades ==
Award	Date of ceremony	Category	Recipients	Result	Ref(s)
AACTA International Awards	January 31, 2015	Best Film	Alejandro G. Iñárritu, John Lesher, and James W. Skotchdopole	Won	
AACTA International Awards	January 31, 2015	Best Direction	Alejandro G. Iñárritu	Won	
AACTA International Awards	January 31, 2015	Best Actor	Michael Keaton	Won	
AACTA International Awards	January 31, 2015	Best Supporting Actor	Edward Norton	Nominated	
AACTA International Awards	January 31, 2015	Best Supporting Actress	Emma Stone	Nominated	
AACTA International Awards	January 31, 2015	Best Supporting Actress	Naomi Watts	Nominated	
AACTA International Awards	January 31, 2015	Best Screenplay	Alejandro G. Iñárritu, Nicolás Giacobone, Alexander Dinelaris Jr., and Armando Bo	Won	
AARP's Movies for Grownups Awards	February 2, 2015	Top 10 Movies for Grownups of 2014	Birdman	Won	
AARP's Movies for Grownups Awards	February 2, 2015	Best Actor	Michael Keaton	Nominated	
Academy Awards	February 22, 2015	Best Picture	Alejandro G. Iñárritu, John Lesher, and James W. Skotchdopole	Won	
Academy Awards	February 22, 2015	Best Director	Alejandro G. Iñárritu	Won	
Academy Awards	February 22, 2015	Best Actor	Michael Keaton	Nominated	
Academy Awards	February 22, 2015	Best Supporting Actor	Edward Norton	Nominated	
Academy Awards	February 22, 2015	Best Supporting Actress	Emma Stone	Nominated	
Academy Awards	February 22, 2015	Best Original Screenplay	Alejandro G. Iñárritu, Nicolás Giacobone, Alexander Dinelaris Jr., and Armando Bo	Won	
Academy Awards	February 22, 2015	Best Cinematography	Emmanuel Lubezki	Won	
Academy Awards	February 22, 2015	Best Sound Editing	Aaron Glascock and Martin Hernández	Nominated	
Academy Awards	February 22, 2015	Best Sound Mixing	Frank A. Montaño, Jon Taylor, and Thomas Varga	Nominated	
African-American Film Critics Association	December 8, 2014	Best Picture	Birdman	4th Place	
Alliance of Women Film Journalists	January 12, 2015	Best Film	Birdman	Nominated	
Alliance of Women Film Journalists	January 12, 2015	Best Director	Alejandro G. Iñárritu	Nominated	
Alliance of Women Film Journalists	January 12, 2015	Best Actor	Michael Keaton	Won	
Alliance of Women Film Journalists	January 12, 2015	Best Supporting Actor	Edward Norton	Nominated	
Alliance of Women Film Journalists	January 12, 2015	Best Supporting Actress	Emma Stone	Nominated	
Alliance of Women Film Journalists	January 12, 2015	Best Original Screenplay	Alejandro G. Iñárritu, Nicolás Giacobone, Alexander Dinelaris Jr., and Armando Bo	Won	
Alliance of Women Film Journalists	January 12, 2015	Best Ensemble Cast	Francine Maisler	Won (Note: Tied with Douglas Aibel, Simone Bar, Antoinette Boulat, Debra Maxwell Dion, Jina Jay, and Alexandra Montag for The Grand Budapest Hotel.)	
Alliance of Women Film Journalists	January 12, 2015	Best Cinematography	Emmanuel Lubezki	Won	
Alliance of Women Film Journalists	January 12, 2015	Best Film Editing	Douglas Crise and Stephen Mirrione	Won	
Alliance of Women Film Journalists	January 12, 2015	Best Film Music or Score	Antonio Sánchez	Won	
American Cinema Editors Awards	January 30, 2015	Best Edited Feature Film – Comedy or Musical	Douglas Crise and Stephen Mirrione	Nominated	
American Society of Cinematographers Awards	February 15, 2015	Outstanding Achievement in Cinematography in Theatrical Releases	Emmanuel Lubezki	Won	
Art Directors Guild Awards	January 31, 2015	Excellence in Production Design for a Contemporary Film	Kevin Thompson	Won	
Austin Film Critics Association	December 17, 2014	Best Film	Birdman	4th place	
Austin Film Critics Association	December 17, 2014	Best Cinematography	Emmanuel Lubezki	Won	
Austin Film Critics Association	December 17, 2014	Best Score	Antonio Sánchez	Won	
Australian Film Critics Association	February 16, 2016	Best International Film (English Language)	Birdman	Won	
Boston Society of Film Critics	December 7, 2014	Best Film	Birdman	Runner-up	
Boston Society of Film Critics	December 7, 2014	Best Actor	Michael Keaton	Won	
Boston Society of Film Critics	December 7, 2014	Best Supporting Actor	Edward Norton	Runner-up	
Boston Society of Film Critics	December 7, 2014	Best Supporting Actress	Emma Stone	Won	
Boston Society of Film Critics	December 7, 2014	Best Screenplay	Alejandro G. Iñárritu, Nicolás Giacobone, Alexander Dinelaris Jr., and Armando Bo	Won (Note: Tied with Richard Linklater for Boyhood.)	
Boston Society of Film Critics	December 7, 2014	Best Ensemble	Birdman	Runner-up	
Boston Society of Film Critics	December 7, 2014	Best Cinematography	Emmanuel Lubezki	Won	
British Academy Film Awards	February 8, 2015	Best Film	Birdman	Nominated	
British Academy Film Awards	February 8, 2015	Best Direction	Alejandro G. Iñárritu	Nominated	
British Academy Film Awards	February 8, 2015	Best Actor in a Leading Role	Michael Keaton	Nominated	
British Academy Film Awards	February 8, 2015	Best Actor in a Supporting Role	Edward Norton	Nominated	
British Academy Film Awards	February 8, 2015	Best Actress in a Supporting Role	Emma Stone	Nominated	
British Academy Film Awards	February 8, 2015	Best Original Screenplay	Alejandro G. Iñárritu, Nicolás Giacobone, Alexander Dinelaris Jr., and Armando Bo	Nominated	
British Academy Film Awards	February 8, 2015	Best Cinematography	Emmanuel Lubezki	Won	
British Academy Film Awards	February 8, 2015	Best Editing	Douglas Crise and Stephen Mirrione	Nominated	
British Academy Film Awards	February 8, 2015	Best Original Music	Antonio Sánchez	Nominated	
British Academy Film Awards	February 8, 2015	Best Sound	Aaron Glascock, Martin Hernández, Frank A. Montaño, Jon Taylor, and Thomas Varga	Nominated	
Camerimage	November 22, 2014	Golden Frog	Emmanuel Lubezki	Nominated	
Casting Society of America Awards	January 22, 2015	Outstanding Achievement in Casting – Studio or Independent Feature – Drama	Francine Maisler	Nominated	
César Awards	February 26, 2016	Best Foreign Film	Birdman	Won	
Chicago Film Critics Association	December 15, 2014	Best Picture	Birdman	Nominated	
Chicago Film Critics Association	December 15, 2014	Best Director	Alejandro G. Iñárritu	Nominated	
Chicago Film Critics Association	December 15, 2014	Best Actor	Michael Keaton	Won	
Chicago Film Critics Association	December 15, 2014	Best Supporting Actor	Edward Norton	Nominated	
Chicago Film Critics Association	December 15, 2014	Best Supporting Actress	Emma Stone	Nominated	
Chicago Film Critics Association	December 15, 2014	Best Original Screenplay	Alejandro G. Iñárritu, Nicolás Giacobone, Alexander Dinelaris Jr., and Armando Bo	Nominated	
Chicago Film Critics Association	December 15, 2014	Best Cinematography	Emmanuel Lubezki	Won (Note: Tied with Robert Yeoman for The Grand Budapest Hotel.)	
Chicago Film Critics Association	December 15, 2014	Best Editing	Douglas Crise and Stephen Mirrione	Nominated	
Chicago Film Critics Association	December 15, 2014	Best Original Score	Antonio Sánchez	Nominated	
Chicago International Film Festival	October 17, 2014	Founder's Award	Michael Keaton	Won	
Cinema Audio Society Awards	February 14, 2015	Outstanding Achievement in Sound Mixing for a Motion Picture – Live Action	Gustavo Borner, Frank A. Montaño, Jason Oliver, John Sanacore, Jon Taylor, and Thomas Varga	Won	
Costume Designers Guild Awards	February 17, 2015	Excellence in Contemporary Film	Albert Wolsky	Won	
Critics' Choice Movie Awards	January 15, 2015	Best Picture	Birdman	Nominated	
Critics' Choice Movie Awards	January 15, 2015	Best Director	Alejandro G. Iñárritu	Nominated	
Critics' Choice Movie Awards	January 15, 2015	Best Actor	Michael Keaton	Won	
Critics' Choice Movie Awards	January 15, 2015	Best Supporting Actor	Edward Norton	Nominated	
Critics' Choice Movie Awards	January 15, 2015	Best Supporting Actress	Emma Stone	Nominated	
Critics' Choice Movie Awards	January 15, 2015	Best Original Screenplay	Alejandro G. Iñárritu, Nicolás Giacobone, Alexander Dinelaris Jr., and Armando Bo	Won	
Critics' Choice Movie Awards	January 15, 2015	Best Acting Ensemble	Zach Galifianakis, Michael Keaton, Edward Norton, Andrea Riseborough, Amy Ryan, Emma Stone, and Naomi Watts	Won	
Critics' Choice Movie Awards	January 15, 2015	Best Art Direction	George DeTitta Jr. and Kevin Thompson	Nominated	
Critics' Choice Movie Awards	January 15, 2015	Best Cinematography	Emmanuel Lubezki	Won	
Critics' Choice Movie Awards	January 15, 2015	Best Editing	Douglas Crise and Stephen Mirrione	Won	
Critics' Choice Movie Awards	January 15, 2015	Best Score	Antonio Sánchez	Won	
Critics' Choice Movie Awards	January 15, 2015	Best Comedy	Birdman	Nominated	
Critics' Choice Movie Awards	January 15, 2015	Best Actor in a Comedy	Michael Keaton	Won	
Dallas–Fort Worth Film Critics Association	December 15, 2014	Best Picture	Birdman	Won	
Dallas–Fort Worth Film Critics Association	December 15, 2014	Best Director	Alejandro G. Iñárritu	Won	
Dallas–Fort Worth Film Critics Association	December 15, 2014	Best Actor	Michael Keaton	Won	
Dallas–Fort Worth Film Critics Association	December 15, 2014	Best Supporting Actor	Edward Norton	2nd Place	
Dallas–Fort Worth Film Critics Association	December 15, 2014	Best Supporting Actress	Emma Stone	2nd Place	
Dallas–Fort Worth Film Critics Association	December 15, 2014	Best Cinematography	Emmanuel Lubezki	Won	
David di Donatello Awards	June 12, 2015	Best Foreign Film	Birdman	Won	
Detroit Film Critics Society	December 15, 2014	Best Film	Birdman	Nominated	
Detroit Film Critics Society	December 15, 2014	Best Director	Alejandro G. Iñárritu	Nominated	
Detroit Film Critics Society	December 15, 2014	Best Actor	Michael Keaton	Won	
Detroit Film Critics Society	December 15, 2014	Best Supporting Actor	Edward Norton	Nominated	
Detroit Film Critics Society	December 15, 2014	Best Supporting Actress	Emma Stone	Nominated	
Detroit Film Critics Society	December 15, 2014	Best Screenplay	Alejandro G. Iñárritu, Nicolás Giacobone, Alexander Dinelaris Jr., and Armando Bo	Nominated	
Detroit Film Critics Society	December 15, 2014	Best Ensemble	Birdman	Won	
Directors Guild of America Awards	February 7, 2015	Outstanding Directorial Achievement in Feature Film	Alejandro G. Iñárritu	Won	
Florida Film Critics Circle	December 19, 2014	Best Picture	Birdman	Won	
Florida Film Critics Circle	December 19, 2014	Best Director	Alejandro G. Iñárritu	2nd Place	
Florida Film Critics Circle	December 19, 2014	Best Actor	Michael Keaton	Won	
Florida Film Critics Circle	December 19, 2014	Best Supporting Actor	Edward Norton	2nd Place	
Florida Film Critics Circle	December 19, 2014	Best Supporting Actress	Emma Stone	2nd Place	
Florida Film Critics Circle	December 19, 2014	Best Original Screenplay	Alejandro G. Iñárritu, Nicolás Giacobone, Alexander Dinelaris Jr., and Armando Bo	2nd Place	
Florida Film Critics Circle	December 19, 2014	Best Ensemble	Birdman	Nominated	
Florida Film Critics Circle	December 19, 2014	Best Cinematography	Emmanuel Lubezki	Nominated	
Golden Eagle Award	January 29, 2016	Best Foreign Language Film	Birdman	Won	
Golden Globe Awards	January 11, 2015	Best Motion Picture – Musical or Comedy	Alejandro G. Iñárritu, John Lesher, Arnon Milchan, and James W. Skotchdopole	Nominated	
Golden Globe Awards	January 11, 2015	Best Director	Alejandro G. Iñárritu	Nominated	
Golden Globe Awards	January 11, 2015	Best Actor – Motion Picture Musical or Comedy	Michael Keaton	Won	
Golden Globe Awards	January 11, 2015	Best Supporting Actor – Motion Picture	Edward Norton	Nominated	
Golden Globe Awards	January 11, 2015	Best Supporting Actress – Motion Picture	Emma Stone	Nominated	
Golden Globe Awards	January 11, 2015	Best Screenplay	Alejandro G. Iñárritu, Nicolás Giacobone, Alexander Dinelaris Jr., and Armando Bo	Won	
Golden Globe Awards	January 11, 2015	Best Original Score	Antonio Sánchez	Nominated	
Gotham Awards	December 1, 2014	Best Feature	Birdman	Won	
Gotham Awards	December 1, 2014	Best Actor	Michael Keaton	Won	
Houston Film Critics Society	January 10, 2015	Best Picture	Birdman	Nominated	
Houston Film Critics Society	January 10, 2015	Best Director	Alejandro G. Iñárritu	Nominated	
Houston Film Critics Society	January 10, 2015	Best Actor	Michael Keaton	Nominated	
Houston Film Critics Society	January 10, 2015	Best Supporting Actor	Edward Norton	Nominated	
Houston Film Critics Society	January 10, 2015	Best Supporting Actress	Emma Stone	Nominated	
Houston Film Critics Society	January 10, 2015	Best Screenplay	Alejandro G. Iñárritu, Nicolás Giacobone, Alexander Dinelaris Jr., and Armando Bo	Nominated	
Houston Film Critics Society	January 10, 2015	Best Cinematography	Emmanuel Lubezki	Won	
Houston Film Critics Society	January 10, 2015	Best Original Score	Antonio Sánchez	Nominated	
Houston Film Critics Society	January 10, 2015	Best Poster	Birdman	Nominated	
Houston Film Critics Society	January 10, 2015	Technical Achievement	Birdman	Nominated	
Independent Spirit Awards	February 21, 2015	Best Film	Birdman	Won	
Independent Spirit Awards	February 21, 2015	Best Director	Alejandro G. Iñárritu	Nominated	
Independent Spirit Awards	February 21, 2015	Best Male Lead	Michael Keaton	Won	
Independent Spirit Awards	February 21, 2015	Best Supporting Male	Edward Norton	Nominated	
Independent Spirit Awards	February 21, 2015	Best Supporting Female	Emma Stone	Nominated	
Independent Spirit Awards	February 21, 2015	Best Cinematography	Emmanuel Lubezki	Won	
London Film Critics' Circle	January 18, 2015	Film of the Year	Birdman	Nominated	
London Film Critics' Circle	January 18, 2015	Director of the Year	Alejandro G. Iñárritu	Nominated	
London Film Critics' Circle	January 18, 2015	Actor of the Year	Michael Keaton	Won	
London Film Critics' Circle	January 18, 2015	Supporting Actor of the Year	Edward Norton	Nominated	
London Film Critics' Circle	January 18, 2015	Supporting Actress of the Year	Emma Stone	Nominated	
London Film Critics' Circle	January 18, 2015	Screenwriter of the Year	Alejandro G. Iñárritu, Nicolás Giacobone, Alexander Dinelaris Jr., and Armando Bo	Nominated	
London Film Critics' Circle	January 18, 2015	Technical Achievement	Emmanuel Lubezki (cinematography)	Nominated	
Los Angeles Film Critics Association	December 7, 2014	Best Actor	Michael Keaton	2nd Place	
Los Angeles Film Critics Association	December 7, 2014	Best Supporting Actor	Edward Norton	2nd Place	
Los Angeles Film Critics Association	December 7, 2014	Best Screenplay	Alejandro G. Iñárritu, Nicolás Giacobone, Alexander Dinelaris Jr., and Armando Bo	2nd Place	
Los Angeles Film Critics Association	December 7, 2014	Best Cinematography	Emmanuel Lubezki	Won	
Make-Up Artists and Hair Stylists Guild	February 14, 2015	Best Contemporary Hair Styling – Feature Films	Kat Drazen and Jerry Popolis	Won	
Motion Picture Sound Editors	February 15, 2015	Best Sound Editing – Dialogue and ADR in an English Language Feature	Martin Hernández, Aaron Glascock, Thierry J. Couturier, Michele Perrone, Michelle Pazer, Glynna Grimala, and Gloria D'Alessandro	Nominated	
Motion Picture Sound Editors	February 15, 2015	Best Sound Editing – Music in a Feature Film	Will Kaplan and Terry Wilson	Won	
Motion Picture Sound Editors	February 15, 2015	Best Sound Editing – Sound Effects and Foley in an English Language Feature	Martin Hernández, Aaron Glascock, Peter Brown, Goeun Lee, Catherine Harper, Jeffrey Wilholt, Gary Marullo, Roland N. Thai, Jeremy Peirson, Alejandro Quevedo, Albert Gasser, Gary Hecker, and Joe Dzuban	Nominated	
MTV Movie Awards	April 12, 2015	Best Female Performance	Emma Stone	Nominated	
MTV Movie Awards	April 12, 2015	Best Fight	Edward Norton vs. Michael Keaton	Nominated	
National Board of Review	December 2, 2014	Best Actor	Michael Keaton	Won	
National Board of Review	December 2, 2014	Best Supporting Actor	Edward Norton	Won	
National Society of Film Critics	January 3, 2015	Best Picture	Birdman	3rd Place	
National Society of Film Critics	January 3, 2015	Best Supporting Actor	Edward Norton	3rd Place	
National Society of Film Critics	January 3, 2015	Best Screenplay	Alejandro G. Iñárritu, Nicolás Giacobone, Alexander Dinelaris Jr., and Armando Bo	2nd Place	
New York Film Critics Online	December 7, 2014	Best Screenplay	Alejandro G. Iñárritu, Nicolás Giacobone, Alexander Dinelaris Jr., and Armando Bo	Won	
New York Film Critics Online	December 7, 2014	Best Ensemble	Birdman	Won	
New York Film Critics Online	December 7, 2014	Best Cinematography	Emmanuel Lubezki	Won	
Palm Springs International Film Festival	January 3, 2015	Director of the Year Award	Alejandro G. Iñárritu	Won	
Producers Guild of America Awards	January 24, 2015	Darryl F. Zanuck Award for Outstanding Producer of Theatrical Motion Pictures	Alejandro G. Iñárritu, John Lesher, and James W. Skotchdopole	Won	
San Diego Film Critics Society	December 15, 2014	Best Film	Birdman	Nominated	
San Diego Film Critics Society	December 15, 2014	Best Director	Alejandro G. Iñárritu	Nominated	
San Diego Film Critics Society	December 15, 2014	Best Actor	Michael Keaton	Nominated	
San Diego Film Critics Society	December 15, 2014	Best Supporting Actor	Edward Norton	Nominated	
San Diego Film Critics Society	December 15, 2014	Best Supporting Actress	Emma Stone	Nominated	
San Diego Film Critics Society	December 15, 2014	Best Original Screenplay	Alejandro G. Iñárritu, Nicolás Giacobone, Alexander Dinelaris Jr., and Armando Bo	Nominated	
San Diego Film Critics Society	December 15, 2014	Best Film Ensemble	Zach Galifianakis, Benjamin Kanes, Michael Keaton, Edward Norton, Andrea Riseborough, Amy Ryan, Emma Stone, and Naomi Watts	Won	
San Diego Film Critics Society	December 15, 2014	Best Score	Antonio Sánchez	Nominated	
San Francisco Bay Area Film Critics Circle	December 14, 2014	Best Film	Birdman	Nominated	
San Francisco Bay Area Film Critics Circle	December 14, 2014	Best Director	Alejandro G. Iñárritu	Nominated	
San Francisco Bay Area Film Critics Circle	December 14, 2014	Best Actor	Michael Keaton	Won	
San Francisco Bay Area Film Critics Circle	December 14, 2014	Best Supporting Actor	Edward Norton	Won	
San Francisco Bay Area Film Critics Circle	December 14, 2014	Best Supporting Actress	Emma Stone	Nominated	
San Francisco Bay Area Film Critics Circle	December 14, 2014	Best Original Screenplay	Alejandro G. Iñárritu, Nicolás Giacobone, Alexander Dinelaris Jr., and Armando Bo	Won	
San Francisco Bay Area Film Critics Circle	December 14, 2014	Best Cinematography	Emmanuel Lubezki	Nominated	
San Francisco Bay Area Film Critics Circle	December 14, 2014	Best Editing	Douglas Crise and Stephen Mirrione	Nominated	
San Francisco Bay Area Film Critics Circle	December 14, 2014	Best Production Design	Kevin Thompson	Nominated	
Santa Barbara International Film Festival	January 27 – February 7, 2015	Modern Master Award	Michael Keaton	Won	
Satellite Awards	February 15, 2015	Best Motion Picture	Birdman	Won	
Satellite Awards	February 15, 2015	Best Director	Alejandro G. Iñárritu	Nominated	
Satellite Awards	February 15, 2015	Best Actor – Motion Picture	Michael Keaton	Won	
Satellite Awards	February 15, 2015	Best Supporting Actor – Motion Picture	Edward Norton	Nominated	
Satellite Awards	February 15, 2015	Best Supporting Actress – Motion Picture	Emma Stone	Nominated	
Satellite Awards	February 15, 2015	Best Original Screenplay	Alejandro G. Iñárritu, Nicolás Giacobone, Alexander Dinelaris Jr., and Armando Bo	Nominated	
Satellite Awards	February 15, 2015	Best Art Direction and Production Design	Stephen H. Carter, George DeTitta Jr., and Kevin Thompson	Nominated	
Satellite Awards	February 15, 2015	Best Cinematography	Emmanuel Lubezki	Nominated	
Satellite Awards	February 15, 2015	Best Film Editing	Douglas Crise and Stephen Mirrione	Nominated	
Satellite Awards	February 15, 2015	Best Original Score	Antonio Sánchez	Won	
Saturn Awards	June 25, 2015	Best Fantasy Film	Birdman	Nominated	
Saturn Awards	June 25, 2015	Best Director	Alejandro G. Iñárritu	Nominated	
Saturn Awards	June 25, 2015	Best Actor	Michael Keaton	Nominated	
Saturn Awards	June 25, 2015	Best Supporting Actress	Emma Stone	Nominated	
Screen Actors Guild Awards	January 25, 2015	Outstanding Performance by a Cast in a Motion Picture	Zach Galifianakis, Michael Keaton, Edward Norton, Andrea Riseborough, Amy Ryan, Emma Stone, and Naomi Watts	Won	
Screen Actors Guild Awards	January 25, 2015	Outstanding Performance by a Male Actor in a Leading Role	Michael Keaton	Nominated	
Screen Actors Guild Awards	January 25, 2015	Outstanding Performance by a Male Actor in a Supporting Role	Edward Norton	Nominated	
Screen Actors Guild Awards	January 25, 2015	Outstanding Performance by a Female Actor in a Supporting Role	Emma Stone	Nominated	
St. Louis Film Critics Association	December 15, 2014	Best Film	Birdman	Nominated	
St. Louis Film Critics Association	December 15, 2014	Best Director	Alejandro G. Iñárritu	Won	
St. Louis Film Critics Association	December 15, 2014	Best Actor	Michael Keaton	Nominated	
St. Louis Film Critics Association	December 15, 2014	Best Supporting Actor	Edward Norton	Nominated	
St. Louis Film Critics Association	December 15, 2014	Best Supporting Actress	Emma Stone	Nominated	
St. Louis Film Critics Association	December 15, 2014	Best Original Screenplay	Birdman	Won	
St. Louis Film Critics Association	December 15, 2014	Best Cinematography	Emmanuel Lubezki	Won	
St. Louis Film Critics Association	December 15, 2014	Best Music	Antonio Sánchez	Won	
St. Louis Film Critics Association	December 15, 2014	Best Visual Effects	Birdman	Nominated	
St. Louis Film Critics Association	December 15, 2014	Special Merit (for best scene, cinematic technique or other memorable aspect or moment)	"Times Square"	Nominated	
Toronto Film Critics Association	December 15, 2014	Best Supporting Actor	Edward Norton	Runner-up	
Vancouver Film Critics Circle	January 5, 2015	Best Film	Birdman	Nominated	
Vancouver Film Critics Circle	January 5, 2015	Best Director	Alejandro G. Iñárritu	Won	
Vancouver Film Critics Circle	January 5, 2015	Best Actor	Michael Keaton	Nominated	
Vancouver Film Critics Circle	January 5, 2015	Best Supporting Actor	Edward Norton	Nominated	
Vancouver Film Critics Circle	January 5, 2015	Best Screenplay	Alejandro G. Iñárritu, Nicolás Giacobone, Alexander Dinelaris Jr., and Armando Bo	Nominated	
Venice Film Festival	September 7, 2014	Golden Lion	Alejandro G. Iñárritu	Nominated	
Venice Film Festival	September 7, 2014	Leoncino d'Oro Agiscuola Award	Alejandro G. Iñárritu	Won	
Venice Film Festival	September 7, 2014	Nazareno Taddei Award	Alejandro G. Iñárritu	Won	
Venice Film Festival	September 7, 2014	Future Film Festival Digital Award	Alejandro G. Iñárritu	Won	
Venice Film Festival	September 7, 2014	Best Soundtrack	Alejandro G. Iñárritu	Won	
Visual Effects Society	February 4, 2015	Outstanding Supporting Visual Effects in a Photoreal/Live Action Feature Motion Picture	Ivy Agregan, Ara Khanikian, and Sebastien Moreau	Won	
Washington D.C. Area Film Critics Association	December 8, 2014	Best Film	Birdman	Nominated	
Washington D.C. Area Film Critics Association	December 8, 2014	Best Director	Alejandro G. Iñárritu	Nominated	
Washington D.C. Area Film Critics Association	December 8, 2014	Best Actor	Michael Keaton	Won	
Washington D.C. Area Film Critics Association	December 8, 2014	Best Supporting Actor	Edward Norton	Nominated	
Washington D.C. Area Film Critics Association	December 8, 2014	Best Supporting Actress	Emma Stone	Nominated	
Washington D.C. Area Film Critics Association	December 8, 2014	Best Original Screenplay	Alejandro G. Iñárritu, Nicolás Giacobone, Alexander Dinelaris Jr., and Armando Bo	Won	
Washington D.C. Area Film Critics Association	December 8, 2014	Best Acting Ensemble	Zach Galifianakis, Michael Keaton, Edward Norton, Andrea Riseborough, Amy Ryan, Emma Stone, and Naomi Watts	Won	
Washington D.C. Area Film Critics Association	December 8, 2014	Best Art Direction	Production Designer: Kevin Thompson; Set Decorator: George DeTitta Jr.	Nominated	
Washington D.C. Area Film Critics Association	December 8, 2014	Best Cinematography	Emmanuel Lubezki	Won	
Washington D.C. Area Film Critics Association	December 8, 2014	Best Editing	Douglas Crise and Stephen Mirrione	Won	
Washington D.C. Area Film Critics Association	December 8, 2014	Best Original Score	Antonio Sánchez	Nominated	

== See also ==
- 2014 in film
