= Washington D.C. Area Film Critics Association Awards 2014 =

Annual US film awards ceremony

13th WAFCA Awards
- Date: December 8, 2014

Highlights
- Best Film: Boyhood
- Best Director: Richard Linklater for Boyhood
- Best Actor: Michael Keaton
- Best Actress: Julianne Moore

The 13th Washington D.C. Area Film Critics Association Awards were announced on December 8, 2014.

== Winners and nominees ==
Best Film

- Boyhood

- Birdman or (The Unexpected Virtue of Ignorance)
- Gone Girl
- Selma
- Whiplash

Best Director

- Richard Linklater – Boyhood

- Damien Chazelle – Whiplash
- Ava DuVernay – Selma
- David Fincher – Gone Girl
- Alejandro G. Iñárritu – Birdman or (The Unexpected Virtue of Ignorance)

Best Actor

- Michael Keaton – Birdman or (The Unexpected Virtue of Ignorance)

- Benedict Cumberbatch – The Imitation Game
- Oscar Isaac – A Most Violent Year
- David Oyelowo – Selma
- Eddie Redmayne – The Theory of Everything

Best Actress

- Julianne Moore – Still Alice

- Scarlett Johansson – Under the Skin
- Felicity Jones – The Theory of Everything
- Rosamund Pike – Gone Girl
- Reese Witherspoon – Wild

Best Supporting Actor

- J. K. Simmons – Whiplash

- Ethan Hawke – Boyhood
- Edward Norton – Birdman or (The Unexpected Virtue of Ignorance)
- Mark Ruffalo – Foxcatcher
- Andy Serkis – Dawn of the Planet of the Apes

Best Supporting Actress

- Patricia Arquette – Boyhood

- Jessica Chastain – A Most Violent Year
- Laura Dern – Wild
- Emma Stone – Birdman or (The Unexpected Virtue of Ignorance)
- Tilda Swinton – Snowpiercer

Best Adapted Screenplay

- Gone Girl – Gillian Flynn

- The Imitation Game – Graham Moore
- Inherent Vice – Paul Thomas Anderson
- The Theory of Everything – Anthony McCarten
- Wild – Nick Hornby

Best Original Screenplay

- Birdman or (The Unexpected Virtue of Ignorance) – Alejandro G. Iñárritu, Nicolás Giacobone, Alexander Dinelaris Jr., and Armando Bo

- Boyhood – Richard Linklater
- The Grand Budapest Hotel – Wes Anderson
- The Lego Movie – Phil Lord and Christopher Miller
- Whiplash – Damien Chazelle

Best Ensemble

- Birdman or (The Unexpected Virtue of Ignorance)

- Boyhood
- The Grand Budapest Hotel
- Into the Woods
- Selma

Best Animated Film

- The Lego Movie

- Big Hero 6
- The Book of Life
- The Boxtrolls
- How to Train Your Dragon 2
- Rio 2
- Mr. Peabody and Sherman

Best Documentary Film

- Life Itself

- Citizenfour
- Jodorowsky's Dune
- Last Days in Vietnam
- The Overnighters

Best Foreign Language Film

- Force Majeure • Sweden

- Ida • Poland
- Mommy • Canada
- Two Days, One Night • Belgium/France
- Wild Tales • Argentina

Best Art Direction

- The Grand Budapest Hotel

- Birdman or (The Unexpected Virtue of Ignorance)
- Interstellar
- Into the Woods
- Snowpiercer

Best Cinematography

- Birdman or (The Unexpected Virtue of Ignorance)

- The Grand Budapest Hotel
- Interstellar
- Unbroken
- Under the Skin

Best Editing

- Birdman or (The Unexpected Virtue of Ignorance)

- Boyhood
- Gone Girl
- Interstellar
- Whiplash

Best Score

- Under the Skin – Mica Levi

- Birdman or (The Unexpected Virtue of Ignorance) – Antonio Sánchez
- Gone Girl – Trent Reznor and Atticus Ross
- Interstellar – Hans Zimmer
- The Theory of Everything – Jóhann Jóhannsson

Best Youth Performance

- Ellar Coltrane – Boyhood

- Mackenzie Foy – Interstellar
- Jaeden Lieberher – St. Vincent
- Tony Revolori – The Grand Budapest Hotel
- Noah Wiseman – The Babadook

The Joe Barber Award for Best Portrayal of Washington, D.C.

- Captain America: The Winter Soldier

- Anita
- Kill the Messenger
- Selma
- X-Men: Days of Future Past

== Multiple nominations and awards ==
These films had multiple nominations:

- 11 nominations: Birdman or (The Unexpected Virtue of Ignorance)
- 8 nominations: Boyhood
- 6 nominations: Gone Girl
- 5 nominations: The Grand Budapest Hotel, Interstellar, Selma, and Whiplash
- 4 nominations: The Theory of Everything
- 3 nominations: Under the Skin and Wild
- 2 nominations: The Imitation Game, Into the Woods, The Lego Movie, A Most Violent Year, and Snowpiercer

The following films received multiple awards:

- 5 wins: Birdman or (The Unexpected Virtue of Ignorance)
- 4 wins: Boyhood
