= Mariana Genesio Peña =

August 19, 1980
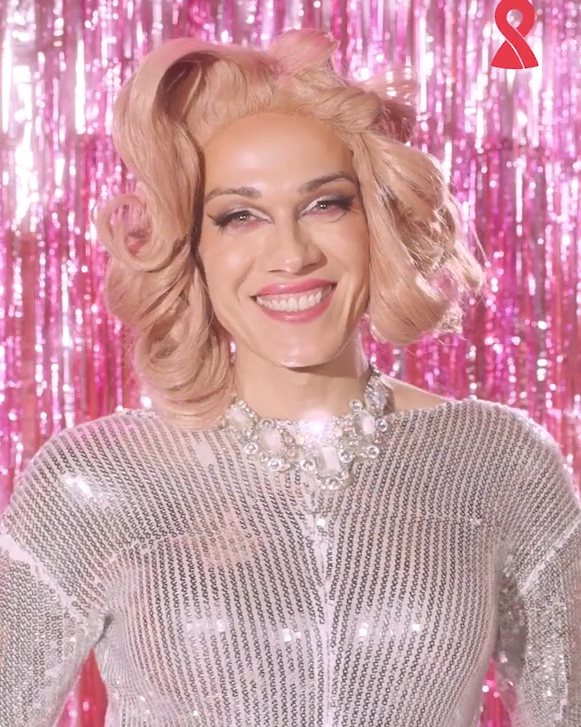
- Mariána in 2023
- Born: August 19, 1980 (age 45); Córdoba, Argentina
- Occupation: Actress
- Spouse: Nicolás Giacobone (m. 2008–2020)

Mariana Genesio Peña is an Argentine actress.

== Biography ==
Mariana Genesio Peña was born on August 19, 1980, in Córdoba. She is the daughter of a homemaker and a food factory owner, and has three siblings. She began her transition at age 18, choosing the name 'Mariana'.

In 2008, she moved to Buenos Aires, where she ventured into modelling with Roberto Piazza and began an artistic career performing in the theatre. She met screenwriter Nicolás Giacobone the same year, and they were married. She starred in the first advertising campaign by a private company in Argentina aimed at the trans community.

She gained international recognition in 2015 after attending the Academy Awards ceremony alongside Giacobone.

In 2018, she acted in the second season of the Netflix series El marginal playing the character Ginna.

That same year, she was part of the cast of the film Animal, directed by Armando Bó. In 2019, she was one of the lead actresses in the telenovela Pequeña Victoria, playing Emma Uriburu, a trans woman within the storyline. At the end of that year, she and Nicolás Giacobone separated after 11 years together.

In 2021, it was announced that she would star in a series about the life of Cris Miró.

In 2022, during a live interview on the América TV program LAM, she was subjected to a transphobic attack via hate speech by a passerby.

== Filmography ==
=== Television series ===
| Year | Title | Role |
|---|---|---|
| 2017-2018 | El marginal | Ginna |
| 2019 | es:Pequeña Victoria | Emma Uriburu |
| 2021 | Pequeñas Victorias | Emma Uriburu |
| 2023 | Vestidas de azul | Chica trans argentina (cameo) |
| 2022-2025 | El fin del amor | Ofelia Weitzman |

| Year | Title | Role |
|---|---|---|
| 2020 | Divina comida | Anfitriona / Comensal (3er puesto) |
| 2021 | Showmatch, la academia | Participante (3.^{er} Abandono) |

| Year | Title | Role |
|---|---|---|
| 2020 | Historias Migrantes | Amaral |
| 2020 | Adentro | Camila |

| Year | Title | Role |
|---|---|---|
| 2017 | Dracula is not dead | Vampire |
| 2018 | Animal | Prostituta |
| 2020 | Copi | Copi |

| Year | Work | Theatre |
|---|---|---|
| 2011-2012 | La casa de Bernarda Alba | Cooperativa |
| 2013 | El Apocalipsis según M | Dir. Nicolás Giacobone |
| 2016 | Street Children | The New Ohio Theatre |
| 2017 | Difficult Transition | dir Kevin Clancy NYC |
| 2018 | Arena | Microteatro |
| 2018 | Cromosoma XX | Microteatro |
| 2022 | ClimaX | Multiescena |
| 2025 | El suelo que sostiene a Hande | Teatro Regio |
