= Florida Film Critics Circle Awards 2014 =

Film award ceremony

19th FFCC Awards

December 19, 2014

Best Picture:
Birdman

The 19th Florida Film Critics Circle Awards were given on December 19, 2014. The nominations were announced on December 16, 2014.

== Winners ==
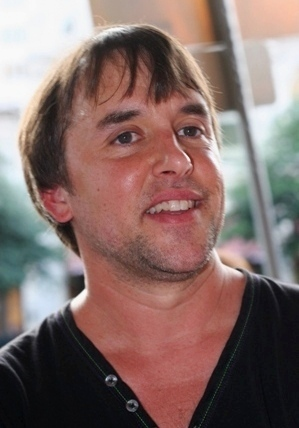
Richard Linklater, Best Director winner

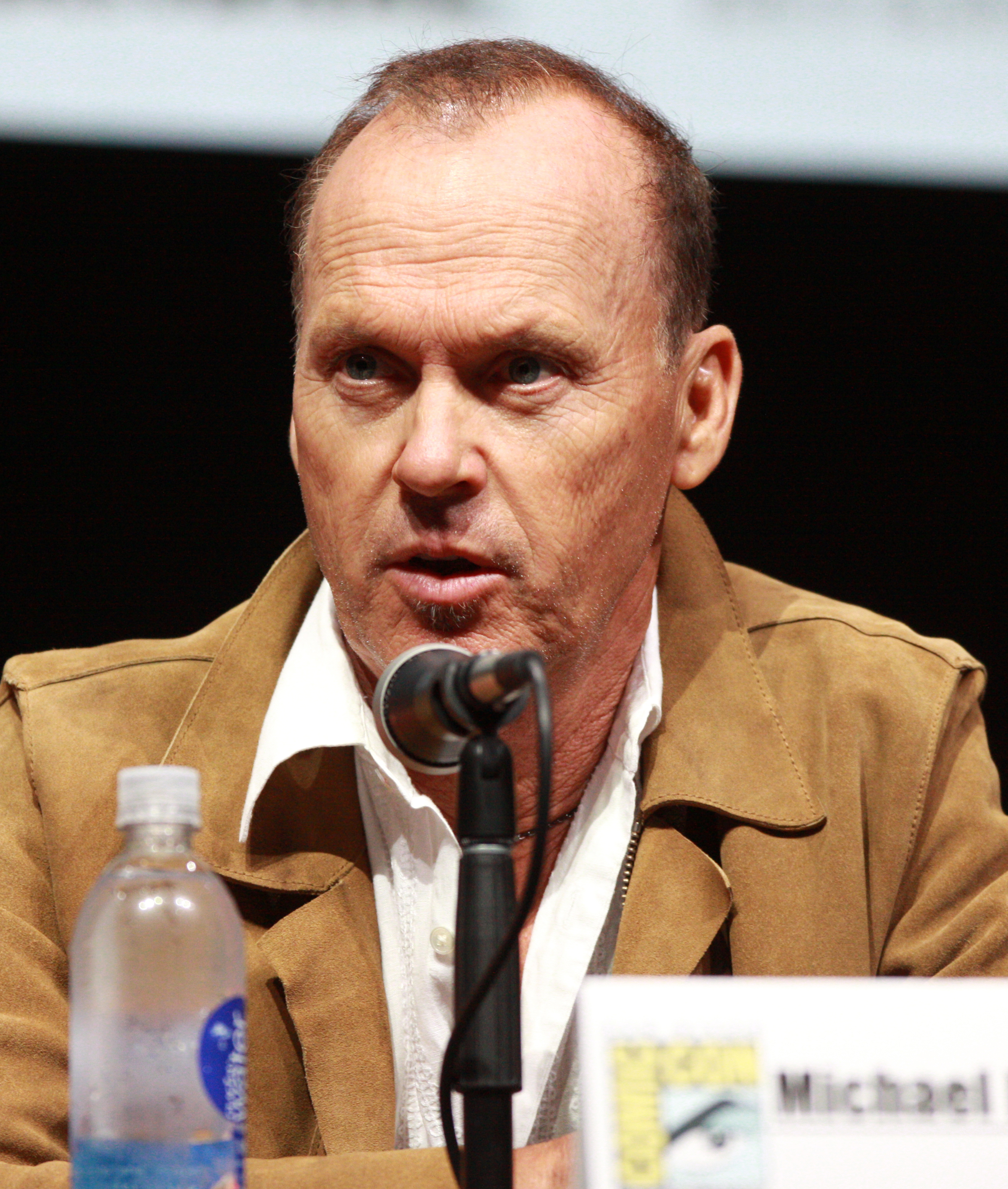
Michael Keaton, Best Actor winner

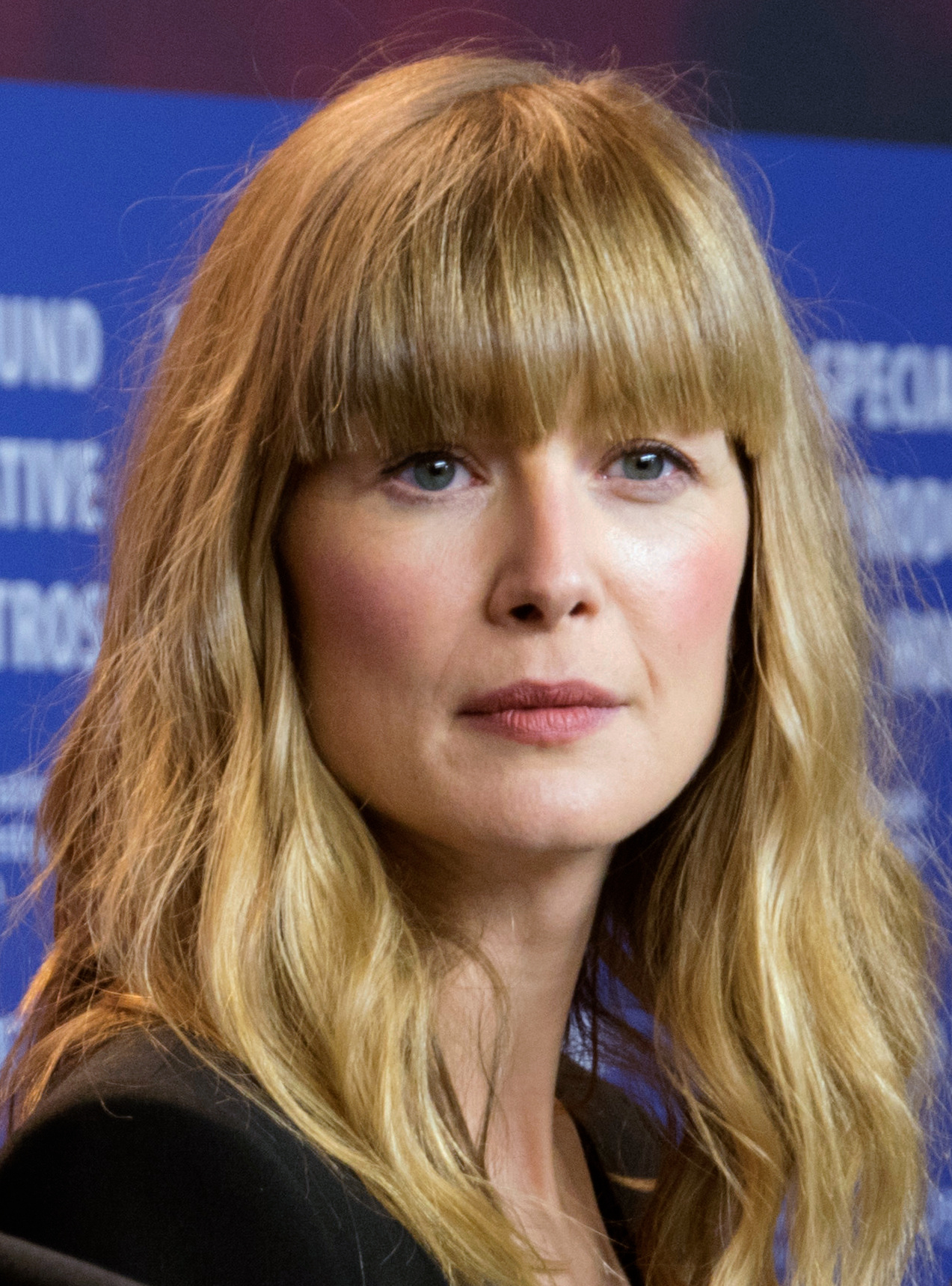
Rosamund Pike, Best Actress winner

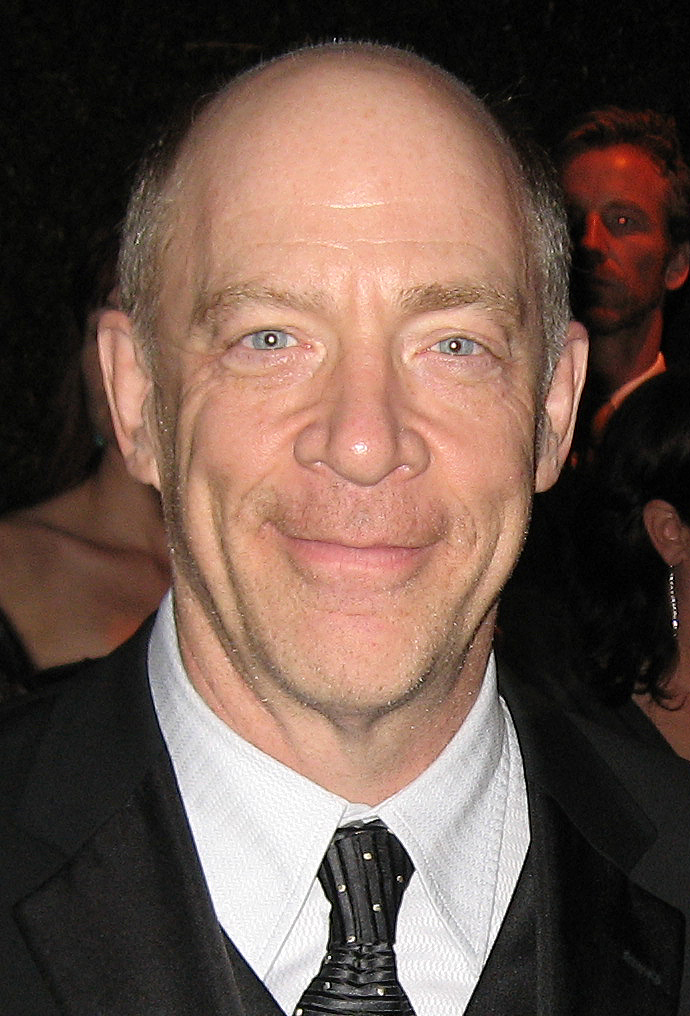
J. K. Simmons, Best Supporting Actor winner

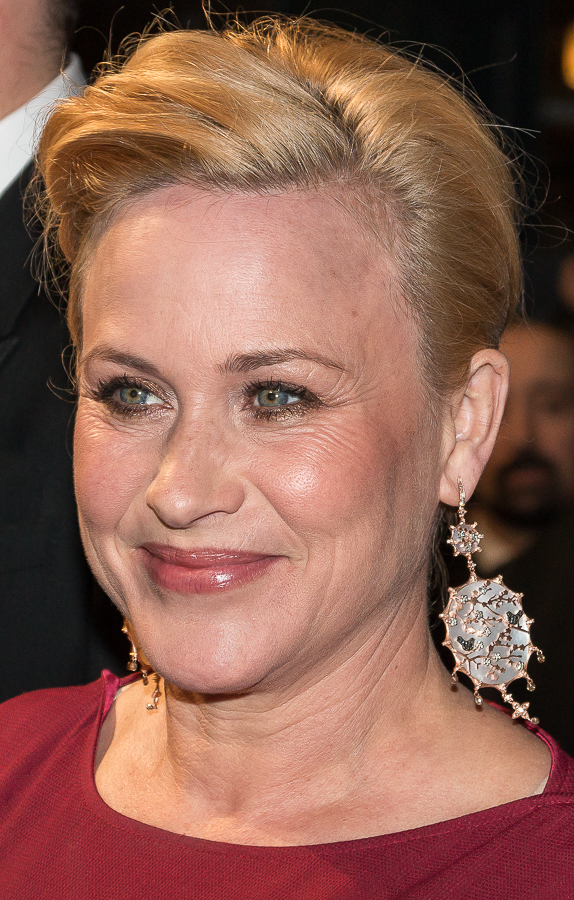
Patricia Arquette, Best Supporting Actress winner

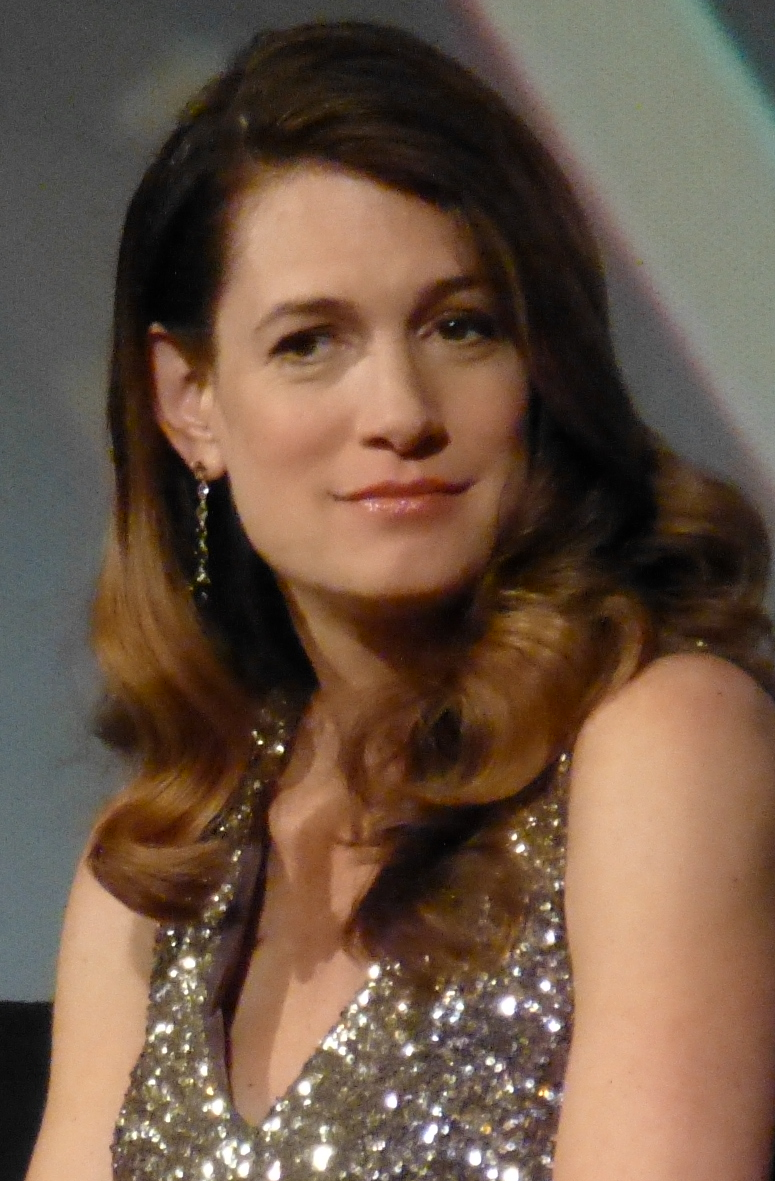
Gillian Flynn, Best Adapted Screenplay winner

=== Best Picture ===
Birdman

- Runner-up: Boyhood
  - The Grand Budapest Hotel

=== Best Director ===
Richard Linklater – Boyhood

- Runner-up: Alejandro G. Iñárritu – Birdman
  - Wes Anderson – The Grand Budapest Hotel

=== Best Actor ===
Michael Keaton – Birdman

- Runner-up: Jake Gyllenhaal – Nightcrawler
  - Eddie Redmayne – The Theory of Everything

=== Best Actress ===
Rosamund Pike – Gone Girl

- Runner-up: Julianne Moore – Still Alice
  - Reese Witherspoon – Wild

=== Best Supporting Actor ===
J. K. Simmons – Whiplash

- Runner-up: Edward Norton – Birdman
  - Mark Ruffalo – Foxcatcher

=== Best Supporting Actress ===
Patricia Arquette – Boyhood

- Runner-up: Emma Stone – Birdman
  - Jessica Chastain – A Most Violent Year

=== Best Original Screenplay ===
The Grand Budapest Hotel – Wes Anderson and Hugo Guinness

- Runner-up: Birdman – Alejandro G. Iñárritu, Nicolás Giacobone, Alexander Dinelaris Jr., and Armando Bó
  - Boyhood – Richard Linklater

=== Best Adapted Screenplay ===
Gone Girl – Gillian Flynn

- Runner-up: Inherent Vice – Paul Thomas Anderson
  - The Theory of Everything – Anthony McCarten

=== Best Animated Feature ===
The Lego Movie

- Runner-up: How to Train Your Dragon 2
  - Big Hero 6

=== Best Documentary ===
Life Itself

- Runner-up: Citizenfour
  - Jodorowsky's Dune

=== Best Foreign Language Film ===
The Raid 2 • Indonesia

- Runner-up: Force Majeure • Sweden
  - Ida • Poland

=== Best Ensemble ===
The Grand Budapest Hotel

- Runner-up: Boyhood
  - Birdman

=== Best Art Direction / Production Design ===
The Grand Budapest Hotel – Adam Stockhausen and Anna Pinnock

- Runner-up: Interstellar – Nathan Crowley and Gary Fettis
  - Into the Woods – Dennis Gassner and Anna Pinnock

=== Best Cinematography ===
Interstellar – Hoyte van Hoytema

- Runner-up: The Grand Budapest Hotel – Robert Yeoman
  - Birdman – Emmanuel Lubezki

=== Best Score ===
Under the Skin – Mica Levi

- Runner-up: Gone Girl – Trent Reznor and Atticus Ross
  - Interstellar – Hans Zimmer

=== Best Visual Effects ===
Interstellar

- Runner-up: Guardians of the Galaxy
  - Dawn of the Planet of the Apes

=== Pauline Kael Breakout Award ===
Damien Chazelle – Whiplash

- Runner-up: Gugu Mbatha-Raw – Belle / Beyond the Lights
  - Jennifer Kent – The Babadook

=== Golden Orange ===
Borscht Corporation for their tireless championing of independent filmmaking
