= Benjamin Kanes =

American actor

- Born: March 27, 1977 (age 48); Haverford, Pennsylvania, U.S.
- Occupation(s): Actor, director, producer, screenwriter
- Years active: 2003–present

Benjamin Kanes (born March 25, 1977) is an American actor, screenwriter, film director and producer, best known for portraying Young Birdman in the 2014 single shot black comedy-drama film Birdman.

== Early life ==
Kanes was born in Haverford, Pennsylvania.

== Career ==
Kanes entered the film industry with roles in short subjects and documentaries, beginning in 2003. During the early years, he also worked as a body double and stuntman; most notably as a stand-in for the lead in Invincible, for Mark Wahlberg in Shooter and The Other Guys, for Jude Law in My Blueberry Nights, for Shia LaBeouf in Transformers: Revenge of the Fallen, and for Colin Farrell in Dead Man Down. He has also served as screenwriter, film editor, associate producer and short-subject producer during his career, and is best known for portraying Young Birdman and inner voice of Michael Keaton's Riggan Thomson in the 2014 single shot black comedy-drama film Birdman or (The Unexpected Virtue of Ignorance), directed by Alejandro G. Iñárritu and written by Iñárritu with Nicolás Giacobone, Alexander Dinelaris Jr., and Armando Bó.

== Filmography ==
Films and TV
Year	Title	Role	Notes
2003	Scary Tales: The Return of Mr Longfellow	Josh	
2005	Catalyst: Izzy	Spence	
2005	He Got Blitz	J.T.	
2006	Bacterium	Jiggs	
2007	My Blueberry Nights	Randy	
2008	Corporate Affairs	Henry	
2009	Michael & Michael Have Issues	Danny	
2009	The Seduction of Eve	Kevin Harvey	
2010	Get Him to the Greek	Concert fan	Uncredited
2010	The Other Guys	Art gallery patron	Uncredited
2011	Blink		
2011	El Caballero	Alistair	
2012	Benny The Bum	Dave	
2013	Broken City	Harvard Club bartender	
2013	Do No Harm	Aaron	
2013	The Penny Dreadful Picture Show	Jack	
2014	Assumption of Risk	Deke Hampton	
2014	Piranha Sharks	Keating	
2014	Birdman or (The Unexpected Virtue of Ignorance)	Young Birdman	Uncredited
2014	Space Dogs	Rear Admiral Trevor Chadwick	
2015	Have You Seen Enough?	Luke	
2015	The Visit	Dad	

Producer
Year	Title	Notes
2014	Assumption of Risk	
2014	See Through: The Work of Oil Painter Anna Fox Ryan	
2014	Community Starts at Home	
2014	Piranha Sharks	Co-executive producer
2014	Stay Regular	Producer, 6 episodes
2015	Beyond the Breaker: Documentary Series	Associate producer, 1 episode
2015	The Last Old Master	

Director
Year	Title	Notes
2005	Catalyst: Izzy	
2014	See Through: The Work of Oil Painter Anna Fox Ryan	
2014	Community Starts at Home	
2014	Stay Regular	6 episodes
2015	The Last Old Master	
