= Houston Film Critics Society Awards 2014 =

Annual US film awards ceremony

8th Houston Film Critics Society Awards
- Date: January 10, 2015
- Location: Sundance Cinemas Houston; Houston, Texas
- Country: United States
- Presented by: Houston Film Critics Society
- Website: houstonfilmcritics.com/awards

The 8th Houston Film Critics Society Awards nominations were announced on the December 16, 2014. The 2014 awards were given out at a ceremony held at the Sundance Cinemas Houston on January 10, 2015. The awards are presented annually by the Houston Film Critics Society based in Houston, Texas.

== Winners and nominees ==
Winners are listed first and highlighted with boldface.

Best Picture	Best Foreign Language Film
**Boyhood**; Birdman; The Grand Budapest Hotel; Guardians of the Galaxy; The Imitation Game; Inherent Vice; A Most Violent Year; Nightcrawler; Selma; Whiplash	**Force Majeure** • Sweden; Ida • Poland/Denmark; Leviathan • Russia; The Raid 2 • Indonesia; Two Days, One Night • Belgium
Best Actor	Best Actress
**Jake Gyllenhaal – Nightcrawler**; Benedict Cumberbatch – The Imitation Game; Tom Hardy – Locke; Michael Keaton – Birdman; Eddie Redmayne – The Theory of Everything	**Julianne Moore – Still Alice**; Marion Cotillard – Two Days, One Night; Essie Davis – The Babadook; Felicity Jones – The Theory of Everything; Reese Witherspoon – Wild
Best Supporting Actor	Best Supporting Actress
**J. K. Simmons – Whiplash**; Josh Brolin – Inherent Vice; Ethan Hawke – Boyhood; Edward Norton – Birdman; Mark Ruffalo – Foxcatcher; Andy Serkis – Dawn of the Planet of the Apes	**Patricia Arquette – Boyhood**; Jessica Chastain – A Most Violent Year; Keira Knightley – The Imitation Game; Emma Stone – Birdman; Tilda Swinton – Snowpiercer
Best Director	Best Cinematography
**Richard Linklater – Boyhood**; Alejandro G. Iñárritu – Birdman; Wes Anderson – The Grand Budapest Hotel; Paul Thomas Anderson – Inherent Vice; Damien Chazelle – Whiplash	**Birdman – Emmanuel Lubezki**; Unbroken – Roger Deakins; Inherent Vice – Robert Elswit; Interstellar – Hoyte van Hoytema; The Grand Budapest Hotel – Robert Yeoman
Best Animated Feature Film	Best Documentary Feature
**The Lego Movie**; Big Hero 6; The Book of Life; The Boxtrolls; How to Train Your Dragon 2	**Citizenfour**; Glen Campbell: I'll Be Me; Jodorowsky's Dune; Life Itself; The Overnighters
Best Original Score	Best Original Song
**The Grand Budapest Hotel – Alexandre Desplat**; The Imitation Game – Alexandre Desplat; The Theory of Everything – Jóhann Jóhannsson; Birdman – Antonio Sánchez; Interstellar – Hans Zimmer	**"Everything Is Awesome" by Joshua Bartholomew, Lisa Harriton, Shawn Patterson, Andy Samberg, Akiva Schaffer, Jorma Taccone – The Lego Movie**; "Big Eyes" by Lana Del Rey – Big Eyes; "Glory" by John Legend and Common – Selma; "I'm Not Going to Miss You" by Glen Campbell – Glen Campbell: I'll Be Me; "Lost Stars" by Gregg Alexander, Danielle Brisebois, Nick Lashley and Nick Southwood – Begin Again
Best Screenplay	Best Poster
**Boyhood – Richard Linklater**; The Grand Budapest Hotel – Wes Anderson, Hugo Guinness; Birdman – Alejandro G. Iñárritu, Nicolás Giacobone, Alexander Dinelaris Jr., and Armando Bo; Whiplash – Damien Chazelle; Nightcrawler – Dan Gilroy	**The Grand Budapest Hotel**; Birdman; Godzilla; The Grand Budapest Hotel; Guardians of the Galaxy; Inherent Vice
Texas Independent Film Award	Technical Achievement
**Boyhood**; Above All Else; Hellion; Joe; No No: A Dockumentary; Stop the Pounding Heart	**Boyhood**; Birdman; Dawn of the Planet of the Apes
Worst Film	
**The Identical**; Blended; Dumb and Dumber To; Left Behind; Transformers: Age of Extinction	

== Movies with multiple nominations and awards ==
The following 16 films received multiple nominations:

Nominations	Film
10	Birdman
7	Boyhood
6	The Grand Budapest Hotel
5	Inherent Vice
4	The Imitation Game
4	Whiplash
3	Nightcrawler
3	The Theory of Everything
2	A Most Violent Year
2	Dawn of the Planet of the Apes
2	Glen Campbell: I'll Be Me
2	Guardians of the Galaxy
2	Interstellar
2	The Lego Movie
2	Selma
2	Two Days, One Night

The following 3 films received multiple awards:

Wins	Film
6	Boyhood
2	The Grand Budapest Hotel
2	The Lego Movie
