= Dallas–Fort Worth Film Critics Association Awards 2014 =

Annual US film awards ceremony

20th Dallas–Fort Worth Film Critics Association Awards
- Date: December 15, 2014
- Location: Dallas, Texas
- Country: United States
- Presented by: Dallas–Fort Worth Film Critics Association
- Website: dfwcritics.com

The 20th Dallas–Fort Worth Film Critics Association Awards honoring the best in film for 2014 were announced on December 15, 2014. These awards "recognizing extraordinary accomplishment in film" are presented annually by the Dallas–Fort Worth Film Critics Association (DFWFCA), based in the Dallas–Fort Worth metroplex region of Texas. The organization, founded in 1990, includes 30 film critics for print, radio, television, and internet publications based in north Texas. The Dallas–Fort Worth Film Critics Association began presenting its annual awards list in 1993.

Birdman was the DFWFCA's most awarded film of 2014, taking five top honors. Birdman won in Best Picture, Best Actor (Michael Keaton), Best Director (Alejandro G. Iñárritu), Best Cinematography (Emmanuel Lubezki), and Best Screenplay (Alejandro G. Iñárritu, Nicolás Giacobone, Alexander Dinelaris Jr., and Armando Bo).

Another film, Boyhood, earned multiple 2014 honors from the DFWFCA. The coming-of-age tale received top honors in the Best Supporting Actress (Patricia Arquette) as well as being presented the Russell Smith Award as the "best low-budget or cutting-edge independent film" of the year. The award is named in honor of late Dallas Morning News film critic Russell Smith. Reese Witherspoon was named Best Actress for her role as Cheryl Strayed in Wild. The other films earning honors were Sweden's Force Majeure for Best Foreign Language Film, Citizenfour as Best Documentary Film, and The Lego Movie for Best Animated Film.

== Winners ==
Winners are listed first and highlighted with boldface. Other films ranked by the annual poll are listed in order. While most categories saw 5 honorees named, categories ranged from as many as 10 (Best Film) to as few as 2 (Best Cinematography, Best Animated Film, Best Screenplay) plus the Best Musical Score category having only the winner announced.

=== Category awards ===
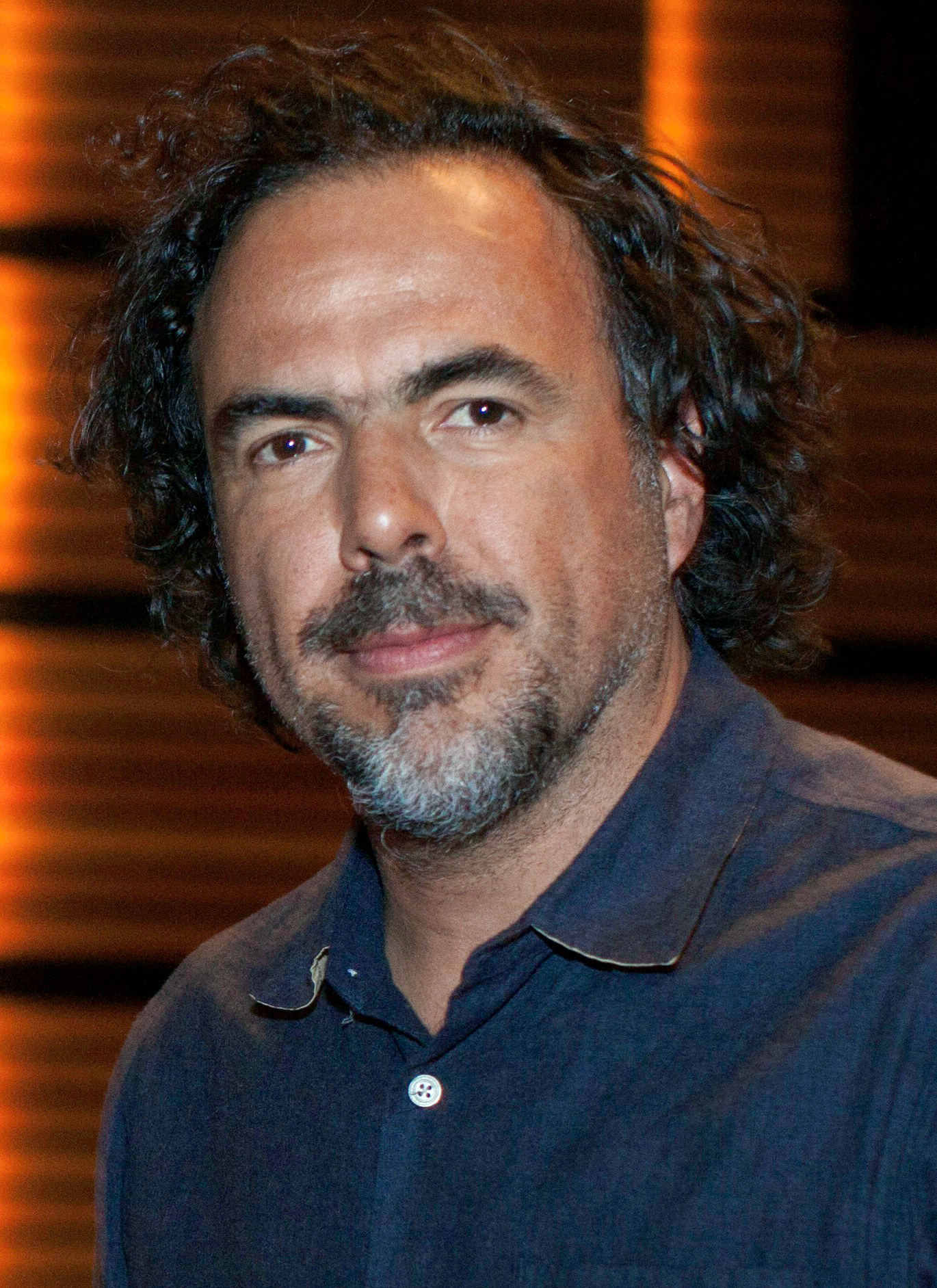
Alejandro G. Iñárritu, Best Director winner

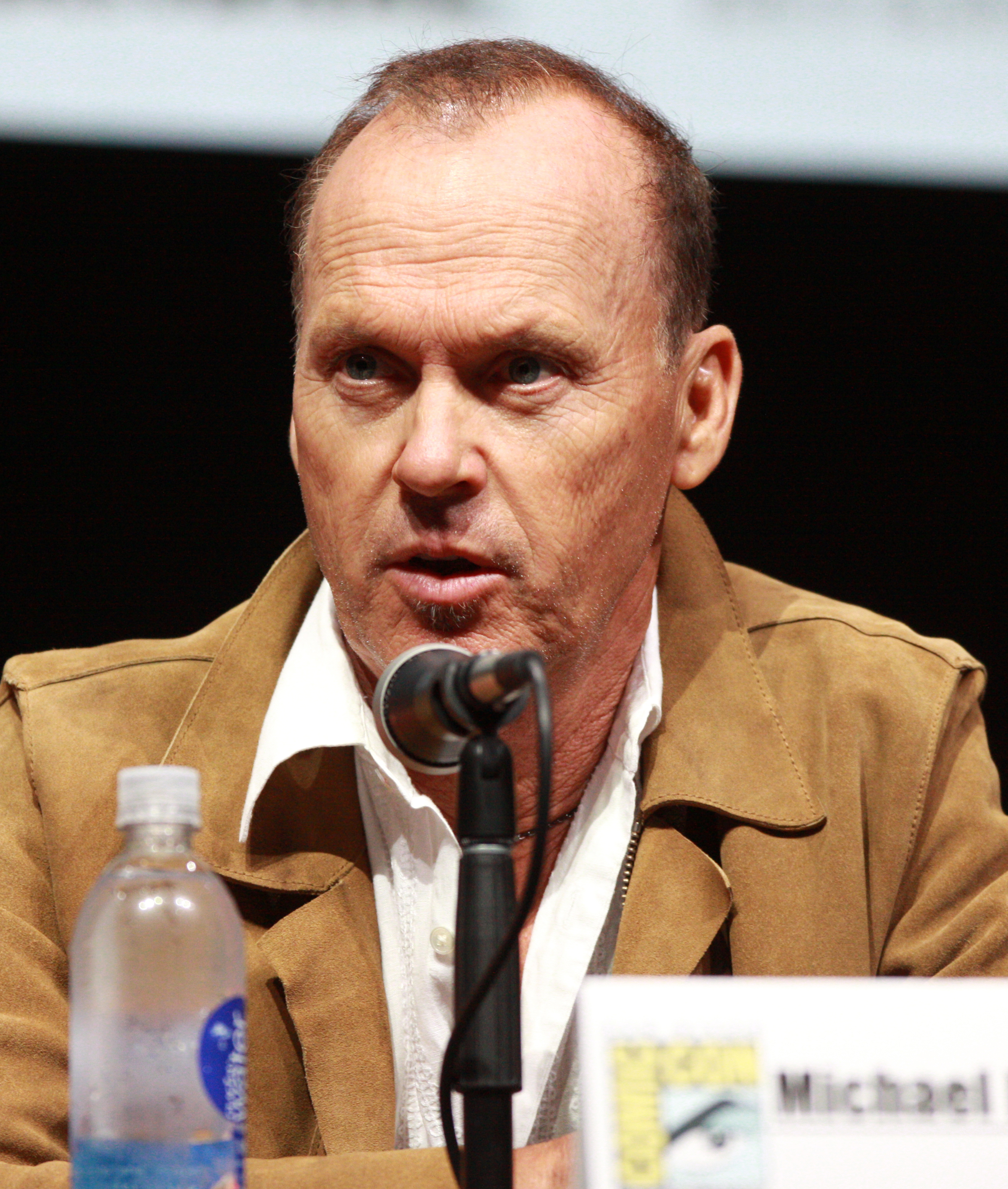
Michael Keaton, Best Actor winner

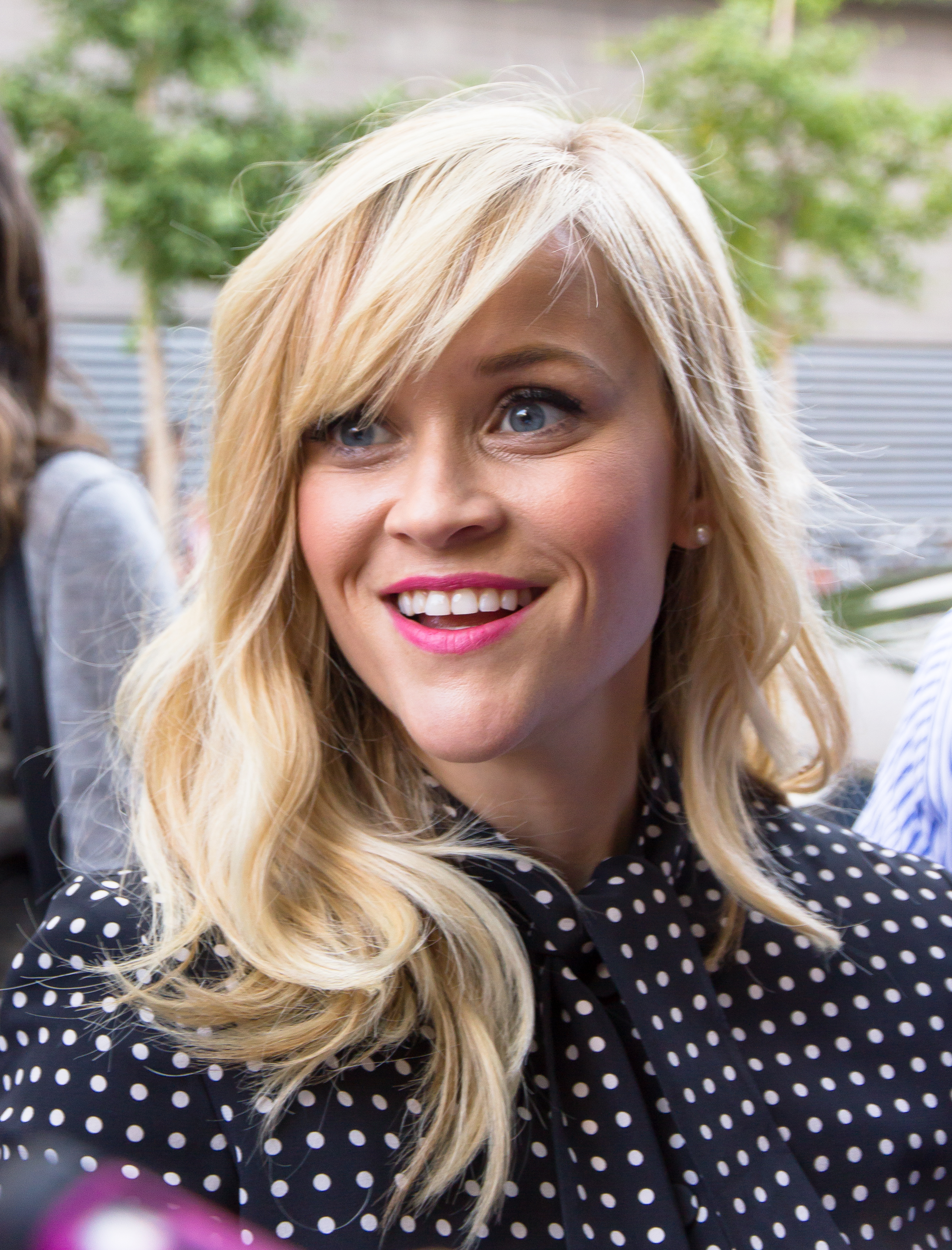
Reese Witherspoon, Best Actress winner

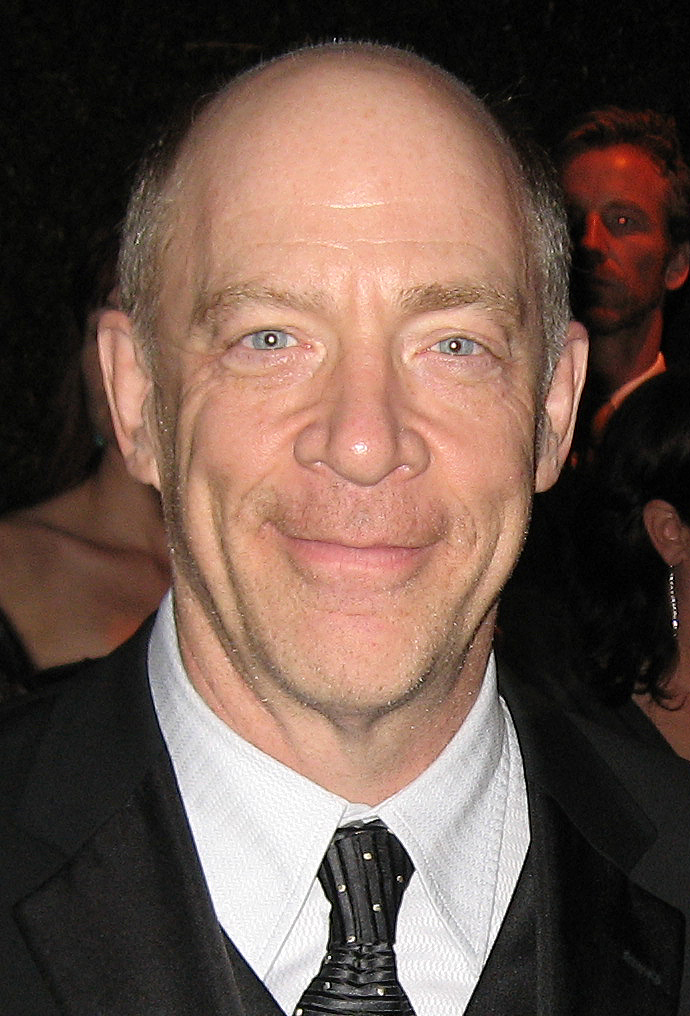
J. K. Simmons, Best Supporting Actor winner

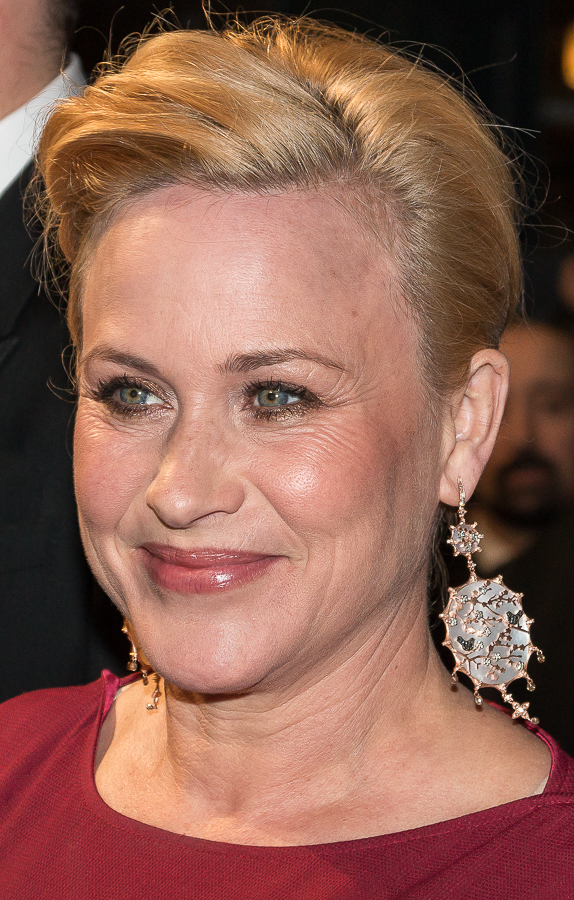
Patricia Arquette, Best Supporting Actress winner

Best Picture	Best Foreign Language Film
1. **Birdman**; 2. Boyhood; 3. The Imitation Game; 4. The Theory of Everything; 5. The Grand Budapest Hotel; 6. Whiplash; 7. Gone Girl; 8. Selma; 9. Wild; 10. Nightcrawler	1. **Force Majeure** • Sweden; 2. Ida • Poland/Denmark; 3. Winter Sleep • Turkey; 4. Leviathan • Russia; 5. Wild Tales • Argentina
Best Actor	Best Actress
1. **Michael Keaton** - Birdman as Riggan Thomson; 2. Eddie Redmayne - The Theory of Everything as Stephen Hawking; 3. Benedict Cumberbatch - The Imitation Game as Alan Turing; 4. Jake Gyllenhaal - Nightcrawler as Louis "Lou" Bloom; 5. Timothy Spall - Mr. Turner as J. M. W. Turner	1. **Reese Witherspoon** - Wild as Cheryl Strayed; 2. Julianne Moore - Still Alice as Dr. Alice Howland; 3. Rosamund Pike - Gone Girl as Amy Elliott-Dunne; 4. Felicity Jones - The Theory of Everything as Jane Wilde Hawking; 5. Marion Cotillard - Two Days, One Night as Sandra Bya
Best Supporting Actor	Best Supporting Actress
1. **J. K. Simmons** - Whiplash as Terence Fletcher; 2. Edward Norton - Birdman as Mike Shiner; 3. Ethan Hawke - Boyhood as Mason Evans Sr.; 4. Mark Ruffalo - Foxcatcher as Dave Schultz; 5. Alfred Molina - Love Is Strange as George	1. **Patricia Arquette** - Boyhood as Olivia Evans; 2. Emma Stone - Birdman as Sam Thomson; 3. Keira Knightley - The Imitation Game as Joan Clarke; 4. Jessica Chastain - A Most Violent Year as Anna Morales; 5. Laura Dern - Wild as Barbara "Bobbi" Grey
Best Director	Best Documentary Film
1. **Alejandro G. Iñárritu** - Birdman; 2. Richard Linklater - Boyhood; 3. Wes Anderson - The Grand Budapest Hotel; 4. David Fincher - Gone Girl; 5. Ava DuVernay - Selma	1. **Citizenfour**; 2. Life Itself; 3. Jodorowsky's Dune; 4. The Overnighters; 5. The Great Invisible
Best Animated Film	Best Cinematography
1. **The Lego Movie**; 2. Big Hero 6	1. **Emmanuel Lubezki** - Birdman; 2. Hoyte van Hoytema - Interstellar
Best Screenplay	Best Musical Score
1. **Alejandro G. Iñárritu, Nicolás Giacobone, Alexander Dinelaris Jr., Armando Bo** - Birdman; 2. Richard Linklater - Boyhood	1. **Hans Zimmer** - Interstellar

=== Individual awards ===
==== Russell Smith Award ====
- Boyhood, for "best low-budget or cutting-edge independent film"
