= London Film Critics Circle Awards 2014 =

British film awards ceremony

35th London Film Critics Circle Awards

18 January 2015

Film of the Year:
Boyhood

British Film of the Year:
Under the Skin

The 35th London Film Critics' Circle Awards, honouring the best in film for 2014, were announced by the London Film Critics' Circle on 18 January 2015.

== Winners and nominees ==
=== Film of the Year ===
Boyhood

- Birdman
- The Grand Budapest Hotel
- Ida
- Leviathan
- Mr. Turner
- Nightcrawler
- The Theory of Everything
- Under the Skin

=== Foreign Language Film of the Year ===
Leviathan

- Ida
- Norte, the End of History
- Two Days, One Night
- Winter Sleep

=== British Film of the Year ===
Under the Skin

- The Imitation Game
- Mr. Turner
- Pride
- The Theory of Everything

=== Documentary of the Year ===
Citizenfour

- 20,000 Days on Earth
- Manakamana
- Next Goal Wins
- Night Will Fall

=== Actor of the Year ===
Michael Keaton – Birdman

- Benedict Cumberbatch – The Imitation Game
- Jake Gyllenhaal – Nightcrawler
- Eddie Redmayne – The Theory of Everything
- Timothy Spall – Mr. Turner

=== Actress of the Year ===
Julianne Moore – Still Alice

- Marion Cotillard – Two Days, One Night
- Essie Davis – The Babadook
- Scarlett Johansson – Under the Skin
- Julianne Moore – Maps to the Stars

=== Supporting Actor of the Year ===
J. K. Simmons – Whiplash

- Riz Ahmed – Nightcrawler
- Ethan Hawke – Boyhood
- Edward Norton – Birdman
- Mark Ruffalo – Foxcatcher

=== Supporting Actress of the Year ===
Patricia Arquette – Boyhood

- Marion Bailey – Mr. Turner
- Jessica Chastain – A Most Violent Year
- Agata Kulesza – Ida
- Emma Stone – Birdman

=== British Actor of the Year ===
Timothy Spall – Mr. Turner

- Benedict Cumberbatch – The Imitation Game
- Tom Hardy – Locke and The Drop
- Jack O'Connell – Starred Up, '71 and Unbroken
- Eddie Redmayne – The Theory of Everything

=== British Actress of the Year ===
Rosamund Pike – Gone Girl and What We Did on Our Holiday

- Emily Blunt – Into the Woods and Edge of Tomorrow
- Felicity Jones – The Theory of Everything
- Keira Knightley – The Imitation Game, Begin Again and Say When
- Gugu Mbatha-Raw – Belle

=== Young British Performer of the Year ===
Alex Lawther – The Imitation Game

- Daniel Huttlestone – Into the Woods
- Corey McKinley – '71
- Will Poulter – The Maze Runner and Plastic
- Saoirse Ronan – The Grand Budapest Hotel

=== Director of the Year ===
Richard Linklater – Boyhood

- Wes Anderson – The Grand Budapest Hotel
- Jonathan Glazer – Under the Skin
- Alejandro G. Iñárritu – Birdman
- Mike Leigh – Mr. Turner

=== Screenwriter of the Year ===
Wes Anderson – The Grand Budapest Hotel

- Damien Chazelle – Whiplash
- Dan Gilroy – Nightcrawler
- Alejandro G. Iñárritu, Nicolás Giacobone, Alexander Dinelaris Jr., and Armando Bo – Birdman
- Richard Linklater – Boyhood

=== Breakthrough British Filmmaker ===
Yann Demange – '71

- Hossein Amini – The Two Faces of January
- Elaine Constantine – Northern Soul
- Iain Forsyth and Jane Pollard – 20,000 Days on Earth
- James Kent – Testament of Youth

=== Technical Achievement ===
Under the Skin – Mica Levi, score

- '71 – Chris Wyatt, editing
- Birdman – Emmanuel Lubezki, cinematography
- Dawn of the Planet of the Apes – Joe Letteri, visual effects
- The Grand Budapest Hotel – Adam Stockhausen, production design
- Inherent Vice – Mark Bridges, costumes
- Leviathan – Mikhail Krichman, cinematography
- A Most Violent Year – Kasia Walicka-Maimone, costumes
- Mr. Turner – Dick Pope, cinematography
- Whiplash – Tom Cross, editing

=== Dilys Powell Award ===
- Miranda Richardson
