= San Francisco Bay Area Film Critics Circle Award for Best Original Screenplay =

Annual US film award

The San Francisco Film Critics Circle Award for Best Original Screenplay is given by the San Francisco Film Critics Circle (since 2006).

== Winners ==
=== 2000s ===
Year	Winner	Writer(s)
2006	Brick	Rian Johnson
2007	The Savages	Tamara Jenkins
2008	Milk	Dustin Lance Black
2009	Inglourious Basterds	Quentin Tarantino

=== 2010s ===
Year	Winner	Writer(s)
2010	The King's Speech	David Seidler
2011	Margin Call	J. C. Chandor
2012	Zero Dark Thirty	Mark Boal
2013	American Hustle	Eric Warren Singer and David O. Russell
2014	Birdman or (The Unexpected Virtue of Ignorance)	Alejandro G. Iñárritu, Nicolás Giacobone, Alexander Dinelaris, Jr., and Armando Bo
2015	Love & Mercy	Michael Alan Lerner and Oren Moverman
2016	Manchester by the Sea (TIE); Moonlight (TIE)	Kenneth Lonergan; Barry Jenkins
2017	Get Out	Jordan Peele
2018	First Reformed	Paul Schrader
2019	Parasite	Bong Joon-ho and Han Jin-won

=== 2020s ===
Year	Winner	Writer(s)	Ref
2020	Minari	Lee Isaac Chung	
2021	C'mon C'mon	Mike Mills	
2022	Tár	Todd Field	
2023	Past Lives	Celine Song	
2024	Anora	Sean Baker	
