= Los exitosos Pells =

- Main characters Martín Pells (left, Mike Amigorena) and Sol Casenave (right, Carla Peterson), in the fictional news channel "Mega News" (whose logo can be seen in the background)
- Also known as: The Successful Pells
- Genre: Telenovela
- Created by: Sebastian Ortega
- Developed by: Underground Contenidos
- Written by: Esther Feldman, Alejandro Maci
- Starring: Mike Amigorena and Carla Peterson
- Country of origin: Argentina
- Original language: Spanish
- No. of episodes: 160

Original release
- Network: Telefé
- Release: November 5, 2008 – July 15, 2009

Related
- Vidas Robadas

Los exitosos Pells (Spanish for "The successful Pells") is a 2008-2009 Argentine telenovela, produced by Underground Producciones and Endemol, and aired by Telefe. It started being aired on November 5, 2008, replacing Vidas Robadas at 10:30PM. After a pair of schedule changes, it returned to 10:30PM until its end on July 15, 2009.

The story is about a successful couple of TV hosts from a news channel, Martín Pells (Mike Amigorena) and Sol Casenave (Carla Peterson). In the first episode Martín Pells falls into a coma, and the CEO of the channel hires an underground actor, Gonzalo Echague (also by Amigorena), who happens to be extremely similar to Pells, to replace him. Such replacement is done not only for the TV but also with friends and relatives, in order that nobody suspects the absence of the real Pells. Gonzalo, acting as Martin, discovers that Martin and Sol had broken up long ago and were only acting as a happy couple for the television cameras. In reality, Sol had another lover which she hid from the public, and Martin had a homosexual relationship with the son of the CEO of the channel. Nevertheless, Gonzalo falls in love with Sol, and the main storyline of the soap opera involves his attempts to build a relationship with her.

The production earned 6 Martín Fierro awards for the 2008 year. The format was brought by many other countries which produced their own versions.

In Vietnam, the series has been aired on VBC under the name Ông bà Pells (literally: Mr. & Mrs. Pells) from mid-2010.

== Design ==
In the beginning, the provisional name for the series was "El exitoso señor Pells" ("The successful Mr. Pells"), with Mike Amigorena as Pells, who was by the time a low-profile actor. Fernán Mirás, Érica Rivas and Diego Ramos, other actors called, were also of low profile. The only famous actress was Florencia de la V, who would have played the villain of the series.

Rivas and Florencia de la V left the production. Rivas had other work offers, and the production was getting delayed a lot. Florencia de la V started to work at Showmatch, a TV show of a competing channel. The role of Florencia was taken by the actress Andrea Bonelli, while the one of Rivas was taken by Carla Peterson. Peterson was a high profile actress, who had shortly before played the main role in the successful series Lalola. With her incorporation, the name "El exitoso señor Pells" turned into "Los exitosos Pells" (changing from singular to plural).

The name of the main character, Martín Pells, is the result of an internal joke of the production: one of the camera operators was called Martín Pels (with a single "L"), and allowed Ortega to use his name in the scripts. The basic idea of the script, a news program hosted by a couple of married hosts, is freely based over Telenoche, a news program of Argentina hosted by decades by César Masceti and Mónica Cahen D'Anvers, and other TV couples as well.

== Plot ==
Martin Pells (Mike Amigorena), an arrogant and manipulative man, is the most famous news presenter of the country. He has worked several years in the "Mega News" Channel. Marcela Nunez (Mirta Busnelli), owner of the "M Noticias" (M News) channel, competitor of Mega News, attempts to hire him, and Pells is determined to accept. Martin tells this to the owner of Mega News, Franco Andrada (Hugo Arana), leading to a heated dispute. In a moment of anger, Franco pushes Martin, who falls backward hitting his head and was knocked unconscious. Scared and worried, believing that he killed him, he left the situation to his right hand, Amanda Wedell (Andrea Bonelli) and leaves the channel.

Coincidentally, his car runs over Gonzalo Echagüe (Mike Amigorena), a poor actor and drama teacher very physically similar to Martin, who would replace Pells. Gonzalo, with his new life as Martin discovers that the Pells is a marriage only in front of cameras and the public. He learns that Martin Pells is gay, having a relation with Thomas Andrada (Diego Ramos), son of the owner of the channel, whereas Sol Pells has an affair with Diego Planes (Walter Quiroz), a Mega News journalist. Over time, Gonzalo falls in love with Sol, but is rejected by her, because of past abuses by Pells.

With the help of Amanda, Gonzalo eventually discovers that his Pells similarity is not accidental, and that they are twins separated at birth. From that point takes more dedication to his role, as he considers its duty to protect the career of his brother while he is in a coma. In particular, he attempts to reverse the image of petty and selfish than others have of Pells in the channel.

Gonzalo Echagüe, in his true self, comes to meet Sol and start a relation with her. At a point of their relation he explains he is required to replace the true Martín Pells, as the true one is in a coma. But Sol does not believe it, and re-think that Martin is mocking her. Further hints of the validity of the story surface later, but Sol still distrusts it due to the absence of solid evidence of Gonzalo's identity or whereabouts of the real Pells.

Meanwhile, Marcela Nuñez obtained the majority of the shares of Mega News channel, becoming their new president. Franco Andrada tries then multiple ill-fated plots to retrieve the shares, including killing her. A new star of the channel, Alex (Andrea Frigerio), loses her pregnancy after being hit by Amanda, who tried to run over Nuñez. Sol, still wary of Martin, says her pregnancy is not his but of Diego planes.

The use of an experimental drug awakes the real Martin Pells, who suffers from partial amnesia: although he remember who he is, what is his work and the people he knows, he can not remember his determination to leave Mega News prior to the accident. He does not return to his role in the newscast; instead, Franco continues to maintain the secrecy hiding him. Gonzalo realizes that the true Pells is awake and find his whereabouts, taking Sol to see him. Thus, he proves her his real identity.

Franco intended to send Tomas and the real Martin to some distant country, while Gonzalo remain with Sun to the public by pretending to be Martin Pells indefinitely. However, Martin falls back into a coma when he saw Gonzalo, characterized as him, in the TV.

Franco forbids Gonzalo to be with Sol or revealing the whole charade, and start several plots to secure his obedience. Gonzalo and Sol turn to Marcela Nuñez, and meet Sol's father. The four of them finally find the whereabouts of Martin Pells and attempt to rescue him, but Martin wakes from the coma and leaves, unaware of the conflict. Martin finally meets Gonzalo and learns the ongoing events, and they trick Franco to confess his crimes with a hidden camera at a bar, which was broadcast live.

Tomas and the real Pells leave to another country, to get married without being followed by the media, while Gonzalo stays in his role in the TV, married to Sol.

== Cast ==
- Mike Amigorena as Martín Pells and Gonzalo Echagüe
- Carla Peterson as Sol Casenave
- Hugo Arana as Franco Andrada
- Andrea Bonelli as Amanda Wedell
- Mirta Busnelli as Marcela Núñez
- Diego Ramos as Tomás Andrada.
- Claudia Fontán as Daniela.
- Lucrecia Blanco as Lily.
- Mex Urtizberea as Sergio.
- Walter Quiroz as Diego Planes.
- Fabián Arenillas as Ricardo.
- Federico Amador as Nacho.
- Diego Reinhold as Charly.
- Gastón Ricaud as Juan.
- Santiago Ríos as Álvaro.

=== Guest appearances ===
- Pasta Dioguardi as Dr. Carlos Wedell.
- Mary Esquivel as Marina.
- Andrea Frigerio as Alex.
- Hilda Bernard as Teresa.
- Rafael Ferro as Esteban Paldini.
- Gonzalo Urtizberea as Lic. Miranda.
- Néstor Sánchez as Dr. Pignata.
- Fabián Vena as Andrés.
- Fernando Peña as Fernando.
- Alejandro Awada as Roberto
- Carlos Portaluppi as Jorge Lauda.
- Florencia Peña as Lucia Naba.
- Fernán Mirás as Teddy.
- Catherine Fulop as Julia.
- Cecilia Rossetto as Virginia.
- Gerardo Chendo as Dr. Gerardo
- David Chocarro as Candidato a jefe de gobierno.
