= Digger (2026 film) =

Film by Alejandro G. Iñárritu

- Theatrical release poster
- Directed by: Alejandro G. Iñárritu
- Screenplay by: Alejandro G. Iñárritu; Alexander Dinelaris Jr.; Nicolás Giacobone; Sabina Berman
- Story by: Sabina Berman; Alejandro G. Iñárritu; Jez Butterworth
- Produced by: Alejandro G. Iñárritu; Mary Parent; Tom Cruise; Michael Sharp
- Starring: Tom Cruise; Riz Ahmed; John Goodman; Sandra Hüller; Michael Stuhlbarg; Jesse Plemons
- Cinematography: Emmanuel Lubezki
- Edited by: Stephen Mirrione; Conor O'Neill
- Music by: Cosmo Sheldrake
- Production company: Legendary Pictures
- Distributed by: Warner Bros. Pictures
- Release dates: September 22, 2026 (Leicester Square); October 2, 2026 (United States)
- Running time: 129 minutes
- Country: United States
- Language: English
- Budget: $125–180 million
- Box office: $51 million

Digger is a 2026 American satirical black comedy film co-written, directed, and co-produced by Alejandro González Iñárritu. Tom Cruise, who also produced the film, stars in the role of Digger Rockwell, an aging oil magnate whose drilling sets off an ecological disaster. The supporting cast includes Riz Ahmed, John Goodman, Sandra Hüller, Michael Stuhlbarg, Robert John Burke, Emma D'Arcy, Burn Gorman, Sophie Wilde, and Jesse Plemons.

Iñárritu conceived the idea for Digger after working on The Revenant (2015). He wrote the screenplay with Sabina Berman, Alexander Dinelaris Jr., and Nicolás Giacobone, from a story by Iñárritu, Berman, and Jez Butterworth. Filming took place from November 2024 to May 2025 in the United Kingdom.

Digger premiered in Leicester Square, London on September 22, 2026, and Warner Bros. Pictures released it theatrically in the United States on October 2, 2026. This made it the final film release by Warner Bros. before the acquisition of Warner Bros. Discovery by Paramount Skydance on October 6, 2026. The film polarized critics, (Note: Attributed to multiple references:) and was a box-office bomb, grossing $51 million on a budget of $125–$180 million.

== Plot ==
Aging oil magnate Digger Rockwell colludes with U.S. President Compson to allow Digger's company, Rockwell United, to extract oil in Alaska and Greenland. Despite repeated warnings about methane beneath the Greenland field, Digger proceeds with extraction operations. Soon after, he learns that the unexpected explosion of one such pocket has dislodged a massive ice shelf and sent it toward Europe. Environmental Safety Chief Dr. Nirav Ganesh warns that its collision with Norway in three days will trigger devastating tidal waves across the North Sea. Rather than inform the public, Compson and Digger establish an information firewall, gambling that the shelf might drift into the Atlantic Ocean and melt. They also discuss Compson's deteriorating health due to rectal cancer.

A prop failure reveals that all events depicted thus far are scenes in a satirical play, titled Fossil Fools, with actor Curtis Markson playing the lead role of Digger. The cast are conducting a dress rehearsal before the play's imminent premiere. Between scenes, Curtis learns that a plane carrying his daughter Hope has disappeared after encountering a category six hurricane. Producer Kenny offers to help locate her through his private intelligence network.

Continuing the play, the ice shelf strikes Europe, flooding major Northern European cities. The United States and Rockwell United are summoned before a fictionalized version of the European Parliament. Vice President Eddie represents Compson, who is undergoing surgery, and promises American assistance. Though accepting responsibility for the disaster, Digger argues that neither he nor his company can be blamed for society's dependence on oil, since he is merely fulfilling global demand. His speech provokes the attendees into fighting among themselves rather than confronting him. Later, a drunken Ganesh warns Digger that an even larger ice shelf has broken away from a Russian glacier and is heading toward Alaska.

Digger and Ganesh inform the sickly Compson. In drug-addled delusion, Compson proposes launching nuclear weapons at China as a distraction, but Chairman of the Joint Chiefs of Staff Fitzgerald recommends targeting the ice shelf instead. Ganesh warns that the strike will fragment the shelf without slowing it down. Nevertheless, Compson authorizes the attack, and Ganesh's prediction proves correct.

Meanwhile, Curtis grows increasingly troubled by the play's satirical excesses. During rehearsal, he breaks down and accuses the production of distorting real events and trivializing the suffering of those who were harmed. Kenny, the real Digger's nephew, explains that he watched an earlier production of Fossil Fools years ago. He subsequently decided to purchase the rights to the play and stage his own production in the hopes that it would help give the public a constructive and cathartic way to process its collective grief. Understanding the significance of his performance, Curtis completes the rehearsal.

Following the ice shelf disaster, Digger and his family are exiled to a converted offshore platform. Five years later, Eddie has succeeded Compson as president after his death, withdrawing all funding and military protection from the platform, which prompts most of Digger's employees to abandon him and steal his food, gold, and boats. Increasingly delusional, Digger attempts to bully God into providing food for the remaining occupants. When this fails, he scatters the ashes of his cat Maggie, shares a brief moment with Kenny (named Kyle in the play), and commits suicide by jumping into the polluted ocean.

The audience watching the play applauds Digger's death and Curtis's performance. Curtis's wife Agatha arrives to congratulate him and reveals that Hope has been found safe, thanks to Kenny. Theater management then announces a "Level 4" condition outside. Audience members put on respirators and leave the theater, emerging into a flooded, devastated city patrolled by soldiers, robots, and drones.

== Cast ==
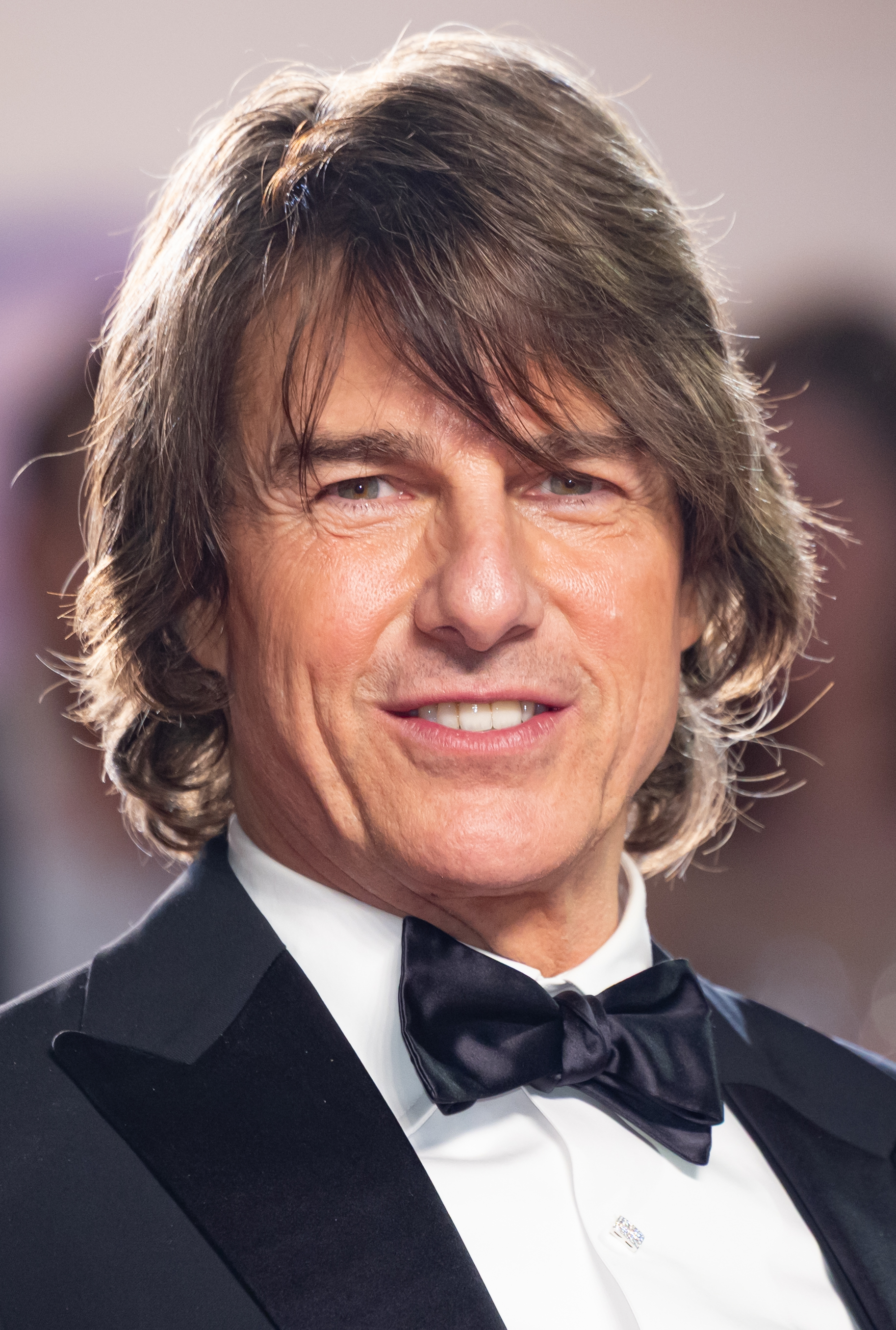
Tom Cruise (pictured in 2025) stars as oil tycoon Digger Rockwell.

- Tom Cruise as:
  - Digger Rockwell, a wealthy oil tycoon whose company causes a world-ending disaster in Greenland
  - Curtis Markson, the actor who plays Digger in the satirical climate change play Fossil Fools
- Riz Ahmed as Dr. Nirav Ganesh, a scientist and Digger's head of Environmental Safety
- John Goodman as Compson, the President of the United States
- Sandra Hüller as Emma Rockwell, Digger's half-sister and business partner
- Michael Stuhlbarg as Eddie, the Vice President of the United States
- Jesse Plemons as Kenny Rockwell, the rights holder to Fossil Fools and Digger's nephew
- Teddy Hawley as Kyle, the Fossil Fools depiction of Kenny
- Robert John Burke as Fitzgerald, the Military Chief of Staff
- Emma D'Arcy as Lina, Digger's assistant
- Burn Gorman as Amos, the Defense Secretary of Staff
- Sophie Wilde as Hannah, the director of Fossil Fools
- Pip Torrens as Schumer, the Attorney General
- Mercedes Hernández as Adelia, Digger's housekeeper
- Danny Kirrane as Sandy Clarkson, the safety officer at Digger’s Greenland oil field
- Corey Johnson as Admiral Jacobs, the head of the American Navy
- Ross Hatt as Dr. Berg, a leading veterinarian
- Stephen Wight as Reverend Moore, the presidential spiritual advisor
- Annabel Mullion as Agatha, Curtis’s wife

== Production ==
=== Development ===
Iñárritu first conceived Digger after working on The Revenant (2015):

I had an idea. Not a script, not a film, just a relentless, recurring obsession that has endured through all these years. I knew who this character was. I knew how he spoke, how he survived, how he seduced reality into agreeing with him. But it took me 10 years to do this film, because I wasn't looking for a story. I was looking for the right way of saying it.

Iñárritu developed Digger at Netflix—then under the title Blah, Blah, Blah—with Leonardo DiCaprio in talks to star, but Netflix scrapped the project because it was too similar to another of its films, Don't Look Up.

In 2019, he began discussing the project with Tom Cruise while filming Top Gun: Maverick (2022). Cruise was a longtime fan, having seen Iñárritu's directorial debut Amores perros (2000) in its initial release. After turning his attention to his passion project, Bardo, False Chronicle of a Handful of Truths (2022), Iñárritu returned to developing Digger.

Iñárritu, Sabina Berman, and Birdman (2014) writers Nicolas Giacobone and Alexander Dinelaris Jr. co-wrote Digger and finished its screenplay in 2023. Iñárritu called Cruise's 10-minute monologue the film's "spine", telling Mid-Day there were "maybe 70 different versions of the monologue as we wrote the script over nine years". In writing Digger, Iñárritu said he was "not interested in pointing fingers or reducing the film to a political commentary or a right or left thing" while singling out Cruise's monologue, adding "we are all part of this madness. That there are no good people or bad people. The system has trapped all of us, and we have to find a way out together."

=== Casting ===
The project was announced and Cruise officially cast in the lead role in February 2024, after he attended a meeting with Iñárritu, following his strategic partnership with Warner Bros. Pictures, with Legendary Pictures to produce the film. In August 2024, Sandra Hüller, John Goodman, Michael Stuhlbarg, Jesse Plemons and Sophie Wilde were added to the cast, with Riz Ahmed in negotiations to also join. In early 2025, Emma D'Arcy, Robert John Burke and Burn Gorman were revealed to have joined the cast. Indian actor Fahadh Faasil was originally considered for the role of Ganesh, but backed out and was replaced by Ahmed due to per diem disagreements.

=== Filming ===
Principal photography began in the United Kingdom on November 7, 2024, taking place at Pinewood Studios, with Emmanuel Lubezki serving as the cinematographer, and was planned to be concluded by late April 2025. Filming was halted for two days in March 2025 while Goodman underwent hip surgery, during which he was hospitalized. The film was shot on 35 mm film using VistaVision equipped with Leitz Cine ELSIE lenses.

The original process of applying prosthetics to Cruise to play the character of Digger Rockwell took six hours, which Cruise protested, claiming it would not work with his schedule. Cruise brought a chalkboard and physically timed how long it took each prosthetic to be applied to deduce the fastest time possible, recounting that "I had a guy there with a stopwatch and I'm like, 'OK, you see that time, six hours? By the time we're done, we're going to get it under an hour". The application process was eventually pared down to under an hour.

Production wrapped on May 3, 2025, after six months of filming under the working title Judy. Later that month, Iñárritu confirmed in an interview that the film would be a comedy.

Puck reported that the film had been greenlit with a $125 million production budget, as a part of Warner Bros. chiefs Michael De Luca and Pamela Abdy's strategy supporting auteur driven productions. Industry insiders claimed that, due to production delays, the initial budget ballooned the final cost to $160 million, with some sources listing the figure as high as $180 million. Variety and The Hollywood Reporter reported that studio representatives denied these larger figures. According to Warner Bros. executives, it kept to its $125 million budget.

=== Post-production ===
In December 2025, the title was officially revealed as Digger alongside a 50-second teaser with the song "O Green World" by Gorillaz. Industrial Light & Magic and Legacy Effects provided the visual effects.

== Music ==
In October 2026, it was announced that English musician Cosmo Sheldrake would compose the score, in his feature film composing debut. The soundtrack album was released digitally by WaterTower Music label on October 2, 2026, alongside the film's release.

== Release ==
Digger had a Royal Film Performance screening at London's Leicester Square on September 22, 2026. It received an international theatrical release on September 30, 2026. The Mexican release occurred on October 1, 2026. It was released in the United States and the United Kingdom on October 2, 2026.

Digger was released in Dolby Cinema, IMAX, and other premium large formats (PLFs). The film's IMAX release concluded the initial run of The Odyssey in the IMAX 70 mm film format after 78 days. In addition, the film received VistaVision screenings. The film is released in a variable aspect ratio expanding horizontally to 1.85:1 Flat for standard or non-IMAX PLFs or expanding vertically in either 1.43:1 for IMAX GT with Laser or 1.5:1 (3:2) in native VistaVision presentations. It is the final film release from Warner Bros. Pictures under Warner Bros. Discovery ownership before becoming part of the Skydance Corporation as part of their merger on October 6.

=== Marketing ===
On April 14, 2026, Cruise and Iñárritu presented new footage during the Warner Bros. Pictures panel at CinemaCon 2026. The Hollywood Reporter called the footage among the best shown at that year's CinemaCon. Thirty seconds of footage from the film, set to Dire Straits's "Money for Nothing", were shown after a retrospective of Cruise's film career over the years before screenings of the re-releases of Cruise's films Top Gun (1986) and Top Gun: Maverick (2022) starting on May 13; the trailer was eventually released online a month later on June 23, followed by three teaser posters, with a full trailer, set to Talking Heads's "Burning Down the House", released on July 13.

Iñárritu said he planned for there to be a misdirection in the film's marketing since its inception, stating "I want to make sure people are surprised when they see the film ... [which is] why our trailers were like, 'What is this about?' Well, we cannot say anything more."

After Digger received mixed reviews before its theatrical launch, marketing shifted to addressing negative reception and encouraging audiences to decide for themselves, with clips featuring review quotes from critics accompanied by a snippet of Cruise's character from the film proclaiming "You know what? Fuck those people!" The tactic was compared to the marketing strategy employed by Francis Ford Coppola's 2024 film Megalopolis, which had similarly mixed reception.

== Reception ==
=== Box office ===
As of November 12, 2026, Digger has grossed $18 million in the United States and Canada, and $33 million in other territories, for a worldwide total of $51 million. Due to its large production and marketing budget, Variety reported the film would need to gross $350 million in order to break even, although a Warner Bros. spokesman put the break-even figure at $300 million. Following the film's $20 million worldwide opening, it was estimated that the film would lose $150–250 million on its theatrical run, and even after taking into account projected future income from digital sales and streaming, profitability would take longer due to Cruise's first-dollar gross deal.

In the United States and Canada, the film earned $3.4 million on its first day, including $1.2 million from Thursday night previews. It went on to take $8 million over its opening weekend, finishing in fifth at the box office. The low opening weekend gross was partially blamed on the film's trailers, which Deadline Hollywood said confused audiences and made them unsure of the film's intended tone and plot. In its second weekend the film made $3.2 million (a drop of 60%), falling to eighth place. One month after releasing on November 2, Digger had still not crossed $50 million during its theatrical run.

=== Critical response ===
Metacritic review
breakdown (unweighted)

Positive
18 (30%)
Mixed
27 (45%)
Negative
15 (25%)

The film received polarized reviews from critics, which some news outlets also described as split down the middle. On the review aggregator website Rotten Tomatoes, 52% of 353 critics' reviews are positive, with an average rating of 6.1/10. The website's consensus reads: "A stylized satire whose audacious design proves too mannered for some of the laughs to smoothly land, Digger is a bold swing of the shovel by Tom Cruise and Alejandro González Iñárritu that misses as often as it strikes gold." Metacritic, which uses a weighted average, assigned the film a score of 46 out of 100, based on 60 critics, indicating "mixed or average" reviews. Audiences polled by CinemaScore gave the film an average grade of "C+" on an A+ to F scale, while 47% of those surveyed by PostTrak said they would definitely recommend the film. Ars Technica stated that "some appreciat[ed] Iñárritu's bold, creative swings and others [found] the film practically unwatchable".

Manohla Dargis for The New York Times panned the film, calling it a "lumbering white elephant of a movie that almost makes you feel sorry for everyone involved" while offering tepid criticism of Cruise's performance, writing that "all of Cruise's strenuous energy helps weigh down an already ponderous movie". Robert Daniels of RogerEbert.com gave the film two out of four stars, stating that "it's excruciatingly painful that this languid, self-satisfied film doesn't work". Bilge Ebiri of Vulture described Digger as "a torturous experience, sometimes purposefully so, often unintentionally so". Peter Bradshaw of The Guardian rated the film two out of five stars, declaring it "an exasperatingly shallow, laborious, self-congratulatory satire with a trick up its sleeve, featuring very good actors giving not very good performances". Tim Grierson of Screen International called Digger an "ambitious misfire", "consistently sabotaged by Iñárritu's gratingly unsubtle comedic approach", adding, "despite the endless actorly fireworks, there's a terminal hollowness at [Digger Rockwell's] centre". Placing himself in the camp of those "who most definitely did not dig" the film, David Rooney of The Hollywood Reporter wrote that it "epitomizes the difference between big swing and hubristic folly more than any film since Francis Ford Coppola's Megalopolis". Carlos Boyero of El País deemed Digger to be "hysterical, pretentious and narratively disastrous".

Variety's Owen Gleiberman wrote that, despite agreeing with the message of Digger, "[it] is practically guilt-tripping its audience", adding "I'm not sure that Digger is going to connect, because it's so full of itself—so top-heavy with importance." David Ehrlich of IndieWire gave the film a C+ rating, writing that the film is "so detached from human truth that its most believable character is a one-eyed animatronic cat named Maggie". Stephanie Zacharek of Time called Digger an "aggressively unfunny, boneheaded farce". Desirée de Fez of El Periódico de Catalunya gave the "exalted and unbridled" film a 3-star rating, lamenting that the political satire is "more irritating than unsettling and, more importantly, it's not particularly funny".For the BBC, Nicholas Barber praised Digger and Cruise's performance and commended Iñárritu's direction, but suggested Cruise's inclusion inadvertently acts as a hindrance in attracting audiences: "If this art-house extravaganza had featured an actor known for left-field indie films, it would have been lauded as a daring experiment. But as it features the actor at the very top of Hollywood's A-list, many viewers will wonder what he was thinking."

Meanwhile, IndieWire reviewer Jim Hemphill called it "by a country mile, the best movie of the year, an exuberant, maximalist comedy with more visual invention and conceptual ambition than any studio film since One Battle After Another." Reviewing for the Los Angeles Times, Amy Nicholson considered Digger Rockwell to be Cruise's "riskiest role in eons" and wrote, "while I don't entirely love this strange comedy, I'm giddy that it's lurched into existence." Robbie Collin of The Daily Telegraph rated the film four out of five stars, billing it as "a serpentine, swaggering satire", "a Dr. Strangelove for the climate crisis". Author Jayson Greene wrote that "Digger may be the best climate crisis movie ever made, cleverly disguised as the worst", calling it "such an accurate portrayal of the necessity of bad art that it's very easy to mistake it for bad art". A small contingent of fans, including Hideo Kojima, calling themselves "Digger Nation" believe the film will become a cult classic.
