= Walter Quiroz =

Argentine actor

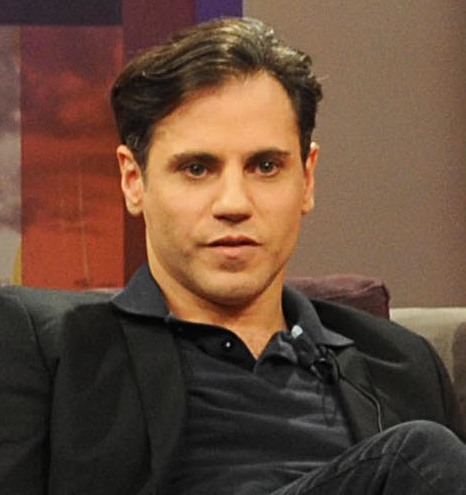

Walter Quiroz (born November 13, 1972, in San Isidro, Buenos Aires, Argentina) is an Argentine theatre, television and film actor.

== Life ==
At the age of 12, while still in school, he began working as a potter in a ceramics factory. The same year, he began studying theater. His former teachers include Carlos Gandolfo, Agustín Alezzo, and Guillermo Angelelli.

In 2008 he played a journalist named Diego Planes in Los exitosos Pells with Carla Peterson and Mike Amigorena; where he was the boyfriend of Sol Casenave (Peterson). He also participated in the play En la cama with Gerardo Romano, Viviana Saccone and Mónica Ayos.

In 2011, he played in the play Espectros by Henrik Ibsen, which premiered with Ingrid Pelicori, Marcelo Bucossi, Horacio Acosta, Iride Mockert, contained live singing by Joaquín Rodríguez Soffredini, under the production of Pablo Silva and the direction of Mariano Dossena.
