= Thomas Varga =

American production sound mixer

- Occupation: Re-recording mixer
- Years active: 1991-present

Thomas Varga is an American production sound mixer. He has been nominated an Academy Award in the category Best Sound Mixing. He also won a Cinema Audio Society award for best sound mixing for Birdman. He has worked on nearly 100 films since 1991.

== Selected filmography ==
- Birdman (2014)
