= Carla Peterson (actress) =

Argentine actress (born 1974)

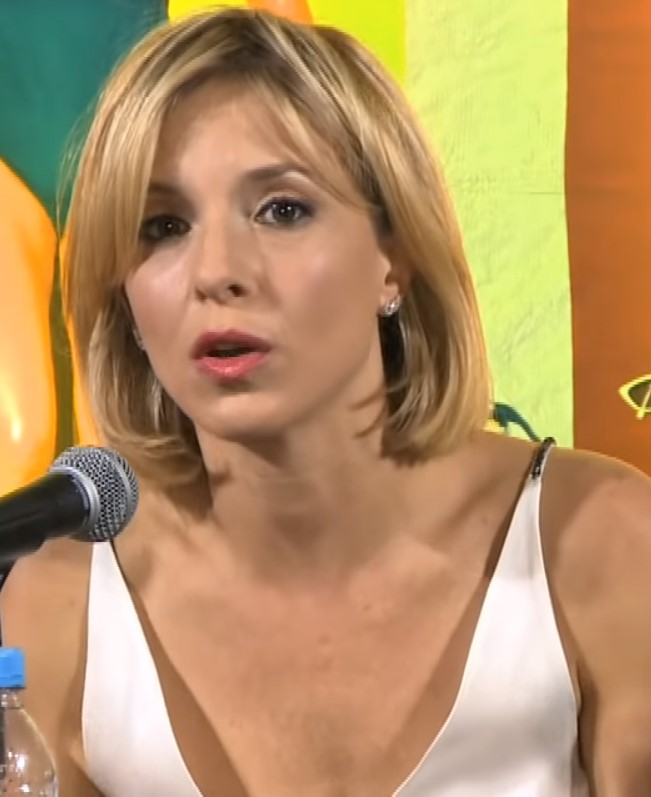
- Born: Carla Constanza Peterson; April 6, 1974 (age 52); Córdoba, Argentina
- Occupations: Actress, model
- Years active: 1993–present
- Spouse: Martín Lousteau (m. 2011)
- Children: 1
- Parents: Damián Peterson; María Rosa Russo
- Website: www.carlapeterson.com

Carla Constanza Peterson (born 6 April 1974) is an Argentine actress and model.

== Biography ==
Carla Constanza Peterson was born in Córdoba, Argentina on April 6, 1974, and lived the first two years of her life there. Peterson is the daughter of a commodore of the Argentine Air Force and a lawyer; she is descended from Swedes through her father and Italians through her mother. Peterson is the oldest of three siblings.

== Personal life ==
She married Argentine politician Martín Lousteau in New Haven, Connecticut in September 2011. On January 26, 2013, she gave birth to the couple's first child, a boy, whom they called Gaspar, who was born in the Clínica Maternidad Suizo Argentina.

== Career ==
At 18 years old, Peterson moved for a couple of months to New York and Los Angeles to take dance classes. Two years later she appeared in a television casting and was chosen to participate in Montaña rusa.

In 1996, she was part of the cast of the television series Por siempre mujercitas. In 1997, she was part of the cast of the television series Naranja y media. From 1999 to 2000, she was part of the cast of the youth television series Verano del '98.

In 2001, she was part of the cast of the television series EnAmorArte. From 2002 to 2003, she was part of the cast of the television series Son amores. In 2004, she was part of the cast of the television series La niñera. In 2004, she was part of the cast of the television series Los pensionados. In 2005, she portrayed the main antagonist of the telenovela Amarte así. In 2005, she played a small role in the television series Mujeres asesinas.

From 2006 to 2007, she was part of the cast of the television series Sos mi vida. From 2007 to 2008, she was the protagonist of the television series Lalola with Luciano Castro. From 2008 to 2009, she was the protagonist of the television series Los exitosos Pells with Mike Amigorena.

In 2010, she acted in the movie El mural. In 2011, she was the protagonist of the television series Un año para recordar with Gastón Pauls. In 2011, she was part of the cast of the television series Los únicos. In 2011 she acted in the movie Medianeras.

In 2012, she acted in the movie 2+2. From 2012 to 2013, she was one of the protagonists of the television series Tiempos compulsivos. In 2013, she was one of the protagonist of the television series En terapia.

In 2014, she acted in the movie Las insoladas. From 2014 to 2015, she was the protagonist of the television series Guapas with Mercedes Morán, Araceli González, Isabel Macedo and Florencia Bertotti. In 2015, she was part of the cast of the television series Dispuesto a todo. In 2016 she, makes a small participation in the television series Educando a Nina. In 2016 she acted in the movie Una noche de amor. In 2016 she acted in the movie Inseparables.

In 2017, she acted in the movie Mamá se fue de viaje. In 2018, she was the protagonist of the television series 100 días para enamorarse. In 2018, she was part of the cast of the television series Edha. In 2018 she acted in the movie Recreo. In 2018 she acted in the drama thriller Animal. In 2019, she was part of the cast of the television series Reacción en cadena.

== Filmography ==
=== Television ===
Year	Title	Character	Channel
1993	Princesa	Catalina Mendoza	Canal 9
1994-1995	Montaña rusa	María	Canal 13
1995	La nena	Sol	Canal 9
1996	Por siempre mujercitas	Lola	Canal 9
1997	Naranja y media	Valeria	Telefe
1998	La nocturna	Martina Aguirre	Canal 13
1999-2000	Verano del '98	Perla Gómez	Telefe
2001	EnAmorArte	Lucía Prieto	Telefe
2002-2003	Son amores	Brigitte Monti	Canal 13
2004	La niñera	Anna Wainer	Telefe
2004	Los pensionados	Sandra	Canal 13
2005	Amarte así	Chantal Villagarcía	Telemundo
2005	Mujeres asesinas	Analía	Canal 13
2006-2007	Sos mi vida	Constanza Insúa	Canal 13
2007-2008	Lalola	Dolores "Lola" Padilla	América TV
2008-2009	Los exitosos Pells	Sol Casenave	Telefe
2011	Un año para recordar	Ana María Santos	Telefe
2011	Los únicos	Doris Hoffman	Canal 13
2012-2013	Tiempos compulsivos	Inés Alonso	Canal 13
2013	En terapia	Juliana Rosso	TV Pública
2014-2015	Guapas	María Emilia "Mey" García del Río	Canal 13
2015	Dispuesto a todo		Canal 13
2016	Educando a Nina	Paz Echegaray	Telefe
2018	100 días para enamorarse	Laura Contempomi	Telefe
2018	Edha	Tatiana Aragón	Netflix
2019	Reacción en cadena	Diana	Canal 13
2020	Casi feliz	Eva	Netflix
2021	100 días para enamorarnos	Martina Guerty	Telemundo
2021	Terapia alternativa	Selva	Star+
2025	The Eternaut	Elena	Netflix

=== Theater ===
Year	Title	Director	Theater
2000-2001	Chicas católicas	Alicia Zanca	
2001-2002	Todo está bien si termina bien	Miguel Guerberof	Teatro Anfitrión
2002	Para todos los gustos	Miguel Guerberof	El ombligo de la luna
2004-2005	El castillo de Kafka	Miguel Guerberof	Teatro del Abasto
2005	¿Quien es Janet?	Claudia Fontán	Teatro variedades concert
2006-2007	Comedia	Miguel Guerberof	Teatro Beckett
2007–2008	Ceremonia enamorada	Carla Peterson	Teatro Beckett
2009–2010	Corazón idiota	Carlos Casella, Daniel Cúparo and Ana Frenkel	Paseo La Plaza
2011	La guerra de los Rose	Marcos Carnevale	Teatro Maipo
2015	Venus en piel	Javier Daulte	Paseo La Plaza

=== Films ===
Year	Film	Character	Director
2007	Ratatouille	Colette Tato	Brad Bird
2009	La ventana	Claudia	Carlos Sorín
2010	Plumíferos	Clarita	Daniel De Felippo
2010	El mural	Blanca Luz Brum	Héctor Olivera
2011	Medianeras	Marcela	Gustavo Taretto
2012	2+2	Betina	Diego Kaplan
2014	Las insoladas	Flor	Gustavo Taretto
2016	Una noche de amor	Paola	Hernán Guerschuny
2016	Inseparables	Verónica	Marcos Carnevale
2017	Mamá se fue de viaje	Vera	Ariel Winograd
2018	Recreo	Andrea	Hernán Guerschuny and Jazmín Stuart
2018	Animal	Susana Decoud	Armando Bó
2023	Women on the Edge	Ángela Trigal	Azul Lombardía
2025	27 Nights		Daniel Hendler

=== Videoclips ===
Year	Artist	Song
1999	Babasónicos	Desfachatados
2019	Jimena Barón	Se acabó

== Awards and nominations ==
Year	Award	Category	Work	Result
2002	Martín Fierro Awards	Supporting Actress	Son amores	Nominated
2002	Clarín Awards	Revelation Actress	Son amores	Winner
2006	Martín Fierro Awards	Supporting Actress in Comedy	Sos mi vida	Nominated
2007	Martín Fierro Awards	Comedy Protagonist Actress	Lalola	Winner
2007	Clarín Awards	Comedy Actress	Lalola	Winner
2008	Martín Fierro Awards	Comedy Protagonist Actress	Los exitosos Pells	Winner
2008	Clarín Awards	Comedy Actress	Lalola	Winner
2009	Martín Fierro Awards	Comedy Protagonist Actress	Los exitosos Pells	Nominated
2009	Clarín Awards	Comedy Actress	Los exitosos Pells	Nominated
2010	Hugo Awards	Female Revelation	Corazón idiota	Nominated
2011	Konex Foundation	Actress Television of the Decade	Diploma of Merit	Winner
2012	Tato Awards	Best Actress of Miniseries	Tiempos compulsivos	Nominated
2012	Sur Awards	Best Leading Actress	2+2	Nominated
2013	Tato Awards	Best Leading Actress in Drama	En terapia	Nominated
2015	Martín Fierro Awards	Actress Protagonist of Daily Fiction	Guapas	Winner
2015	ACE Awards	Leading Actress in Dramatic Comedy	Venus en piel	Nominated
2019	Martín Fierro Awards	Actress Protagonist of Daily Fiction	100 días para enamorarse	Winner
