= Animal (2018 film) =

- Animal original poster
- Directed by: Armando Bó II
- Written by: Nicolas Giacobone
- Produced by: Rebolucion and MyS Producción
- Starring: Guillermo Francella; Carla Peterson
- Cinematography: Javier Julia
- Edited by: Pablo Barbieri
- Music by: Pedro Oneto
- Distributed by: Grupo Telefe; Buena Vista Internacional
- Release date: 24 May 2018
- Running time: 113 minutes
- Countries: Argentina; Spain
- Language: Spanish
- Budget: 1 000 000 USD
- Box office: 1 955 255 USD

Animal is a 2018 Argentine-Spanish drama thriller film directed by Armando Bó II, starring Guillermo Francella and Carla Peterson. Animal was partially funded by Argentina's National Institute of Cinema and Audiovisual Arts (INCAA).

== Plot ==
Antonio Decoud, a family man and manager of a meat processing plant, lives a wealthy life in an upper-class neighborhood in Mar del Plata. His polite lifestyle is shaken by an unexpected illness. Decoud will be forced to fight on unknown ground in order to find an organ donor. Meanwhile, Elías Montero and his pregnant wife Lucy Villar, a homeless couple, see an opportunity to change their lives by extorting money from Decoud.

== Cast ==
- Guillermo Francella... Antonio Decoud
- Carla Peterson... Susana Decoud
- Federico Salles... Elías Montero
- Mercedes De Santis... Lucy Villar
- Gloria Carrá... Josefina Hertz
- Marcelo Subiotto... Gabriel Hertz
- Majo Chicar... Linda Decoud
- Joaquín Flammini... Tomás Decoud

== Reception ==
Ezequiel Boetti from Otros Cines says that Bo made an essay on cruelty, selfishness, contempt and class conflict. Ambito Financiero's Paraná Sendrós praises Francella's characterization of Decoud, and describes the movie as a satire on the fragile nature of relationships and fortune. Gaspar Zimerman from Clarín compares Animal with Cape Fear, as both films are "fictional experiments" that confront a scared bourgeois with an out-of-control underclass. Tobias Dunschen from Critique Film observes the lack of a dramatic counterweight to the flashy treatment of Decoud's frenzied search for a life-saving organ. The Spanish critic Arantxa Acosta, from La Realidad no Existe, called the film "terrifying" because it inspires empathy for the two antagonists, Decoud and Montero, no matter how low they can fall.

== Accolades ==
Animal competed in the following film festivals:

- Chicago International Film Festival
- Busan International Film Festival
- Fajr Film Festival
- Le Roche-sur-Yon Festival
- Sitges Film Festival
