= Alexander Dinelaris Jr. =

American screenwriter and playwright

- Born: 1967 or 1968 (age 58–59); New York City, U.S.
- Occupations: Screenwriter; playwright
- Awards: Academy Award for Best Original Screenplay (2015)

Alexander Dinelaris Jr. (born 1967 or 1968) is an American screenwriter and playwright. In film, he is known for his work with filmmaker Alejandro G. Iñárritu, co-writing the screenplays for Birdman (2014) and The Revenant (2015), and winning the Academy Award for Best Original Screenplay for the former. For the stage, his credits include the book for On Your Feet!, a jukebox musical about Gloria Estefan.

== Background ==
Dinelaris was born in the Washington Heights neighborhood of Manhattan, New York, and lived there until he was six years old, after which he grew up in East Rockaway, New York. He is of Cuban and Puerto Rican ancestry through his maternal grandparents, and Armenian ancestry on his father's side. He took an early interest in theatre after acting in a high school production of Fiddler on the Roof, and pursued directing for some time before turning to writing.

== Career ==
=== Theater ===
In 2003, Dinelaris provided additional book and lyrics to Zanna, Dont!, receiving Drama Desk nominations for Best Book of a Musical and Best Lyrics.

In 2009, his play Still Life was presented Off-Broadway in a Manhattan Class Company production starring Sarah Paulson, Frederick Weller, Ian Kahn, and Dominic Chianese.

Dinelaris wrote the book for the Broadway musical On Your Feet! about the life and career of Gloria Estefan. For this, he was nominated for the Outer Critics Circle Award for Outstanding Book of a Musical.

In 2012, he wrote an off-Broadway play, Red Dog Howls, about a man uncovering his family's buried secrets related to the tragedy of the Armenian Genocide.

In 2019, he formed his New York–based production company Lexicon and announced that its first feature film will be an adaptation of the Broadway musical Jekyll & Hyde, with Dinelaris set to adapt into a screenplay and produce. However, no updates were made since 2020, with the impact of the COVID-19 pandemic on the film industry cited as a reason.

The same year, the first workshop of Boman Irani's Spiral Bound was conducted by Dinelaris.

=== Film ===
At the 87th Academy Awards in 2015, Dinelaris, alongside Alejandro G. Iñárritu, Nicolás Giacobone, and Armando Bó won the Academy Award for Best Original Screenplay for the 2014 film Birdman. He first connected with Iñárritu following the success of his play Still Life.

In 2015, Dinelaris continued his collaboration with Iñárritu, serving as co-producer on The Revenant.

In 2019, he filmed the short film In This, Our Time, which he wrote and directed.

In 2022, Dinelaris co-wrote the screenplay to Carmen, directed by Benjamin Millipied and starring Paul Mescal and Melissa Barrera.

On February 8, 2023, it was announced that Alexander Dinelaris Jr is working with Residente to co-write a new film title Porto Rico.

Dinelaris is working with director Alejandro Iñárritu as co-script writer for the upcoming black comedy film Digger, set to be released in 2026. It features prominent Hollywood actor Tom Cruise in the lead role.

== Credits ==
Film

- Birdman (screenplay)
- The Revenant (co-producer)
- Carmen (screenplay)
- The Mehta Boys (screenplay)
- In The Summer (producer)
- Digger (screenplay)
- Porto Rico (screenplay)

Theater

- Zanna, Dont! (additional material)
- On Your Feet! (libretto)
- Still Life (playwright)
