= Armando Bó (screenwriter) =

Argentinian screenwriter and director

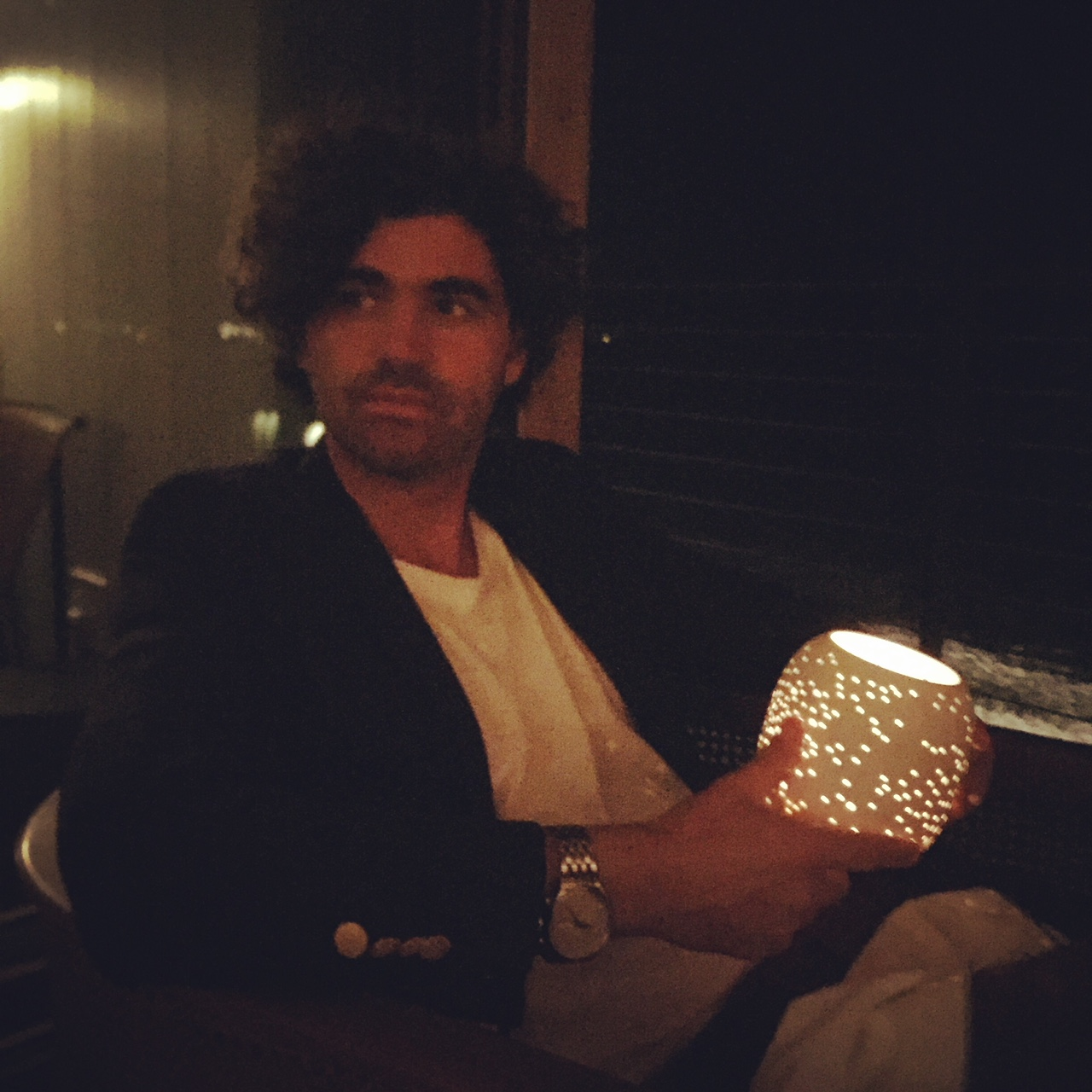
- Bó in 2018
- Born: Armando Bó II; 9 December 1978 (age 47)
- Other name: Armando Bó Nieto
- Occupations: Film director; screenwriter
- Years active: 2010–present
- Spouse: Luciana Marti
- Children: 2
- Relatives: Víctor Bó (father); Chia Sly ( mother); Armando Bó (grandfather)

Armando Bó II (born 9 December 1978) is an Argentine screenwriter and film director. He won the Academy Award for Best Original Screenplay for the 2014 film Birdman at the 87th Academy Awards in 2015, together with director Alejandro G. Iñárritu, Alexander Dinelaris Jr., and Bo's cousin Nicolás Giacobone. He also directed the Qualcomm-distributed short film Lifeline in 2016, which was also a Best of Branded Entertainment winner at the 2017 One Show Awards.

His father is the actor Víctor Bó and his mother is Chia Sly. His paternal grandfather was film director Armando Bó.

== Filmography ==
- El Presidente (2020-) - creator, director, writer
- Animal (2018) - screenwriter, director; starring Guillermo Francella
- Birdman (2014) - screenwriter; starring Michael Keaton, Zach Galifianakis, Edward Norton, Emma Stone and Naomi Watts
- The Last Elvis (2012) - screenwriter, director, producer, editor, starring John McInerny
- Biutiful (2010) - screenwriter; starring Javier Bardem
