= Nicolás Giacobone =

Argentine writer and screenwriter

- Born: Argentina
- Occupation: Writer
- Years active: 2003–present
- Relatives: Armando Bó (maternal grandfather); Víctor Bó (uncle); Armando Bó (cousin)

Nicolás Giacobone is an Argentine writer and screenwriter. He won the Academy Award for Best Original Screenplay for the 2014 film Birdman. He wrote a book of short stories Algún Cristo (2001), and the novels The Crossed-Out Notebook (2018) and Bum Bum Bum (2020). His screenplay for the film John and the Hole was part of the official selection of the 2020 Cannes Film Festival and premiered at the 2021 Sundance Film Festival.

== Personal life ==
His maternal grandfather was film director Armando Bó, his uncle is actor Víctor Bó, and his cousin is fellow screenwriter Armando Bó, with whom he won the Oscar.

== Filmography ==
Year	Film	Writer	Producer
2010	Biutiful	Yes	No
2011	El último Elvis	Yes	No
2014	Birdman or (The Unexpected Virtue of Ignorance)	Yes	Associate
2015	The Revenant	No	Co-producer
2018	Animal	Yes	No
2021	John and the Hole	Yes	Executive
2022	Bardo, False Chronicle of a Handful of Truths	Yes	No
2026	Digger	Yes	No
