= Reese Witherspoon filmography =

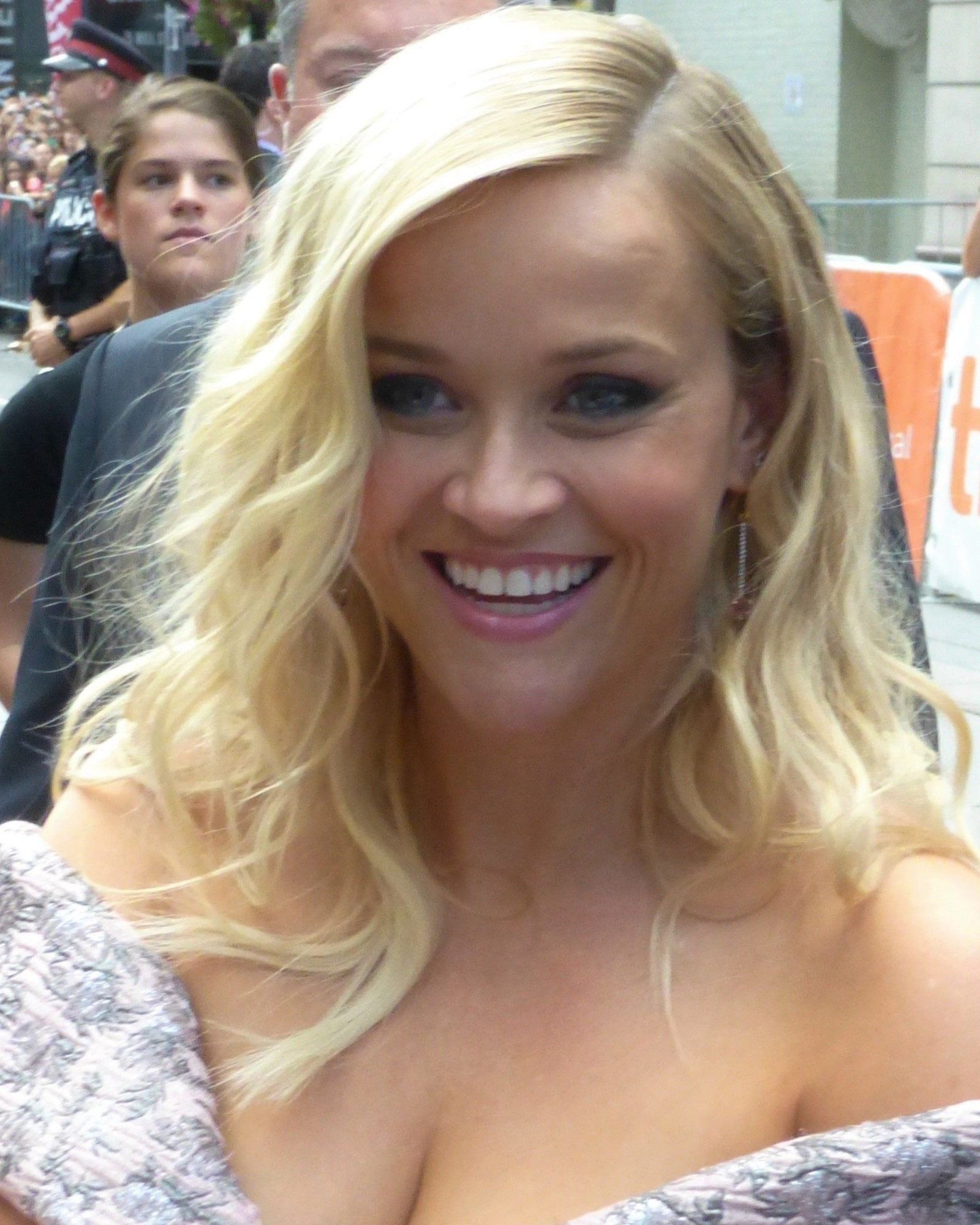
Witherspoon at the 2016 Toronto International Film Festival

Reese Witherspoon is an American actress. She made her acting debut in The Man in the Moon (1991). After featuring in the Disney production A Far Off Place (1993), she starred in Fear (1996). She then rose to prominence in 1999 with Cruel Intentions and for her portrayal of Tracy Flick in the black comedy Election, which earned her a Golden Globe Award for Best Actress – Motion Picture Comedy or Musical nomination. She achieved fame for her work on romantic comedies with her role as Elle Woods in the comedy Legally Blonde (2001) and its 2003 sequel, as well as her starring role in Sweet Home Alabama (2002). She won the Academy Award for Best Actress for her portrayal of June Carter Cash in the 2005 biographical musical film Walk the Line. She also received an Academy Award nomination for her performance in the 2014 drama Wild.

Witherspoon became a leading actress on the HBO television series Big Little Lies (2017–2019) (winning the Primetime Emmy Award for Outstanding Limited Series as an executive producer), the Apple TV+ drama series The Morning Show (2019–present), and the Hulu miniseries Little Fires Everywhere (2020).

Launching Hello Sunshine in 2014, Witherspoon has served as producer on several of her films and shows, in addition to the 2014 psychological thriller Gone Girl.

== Film ==
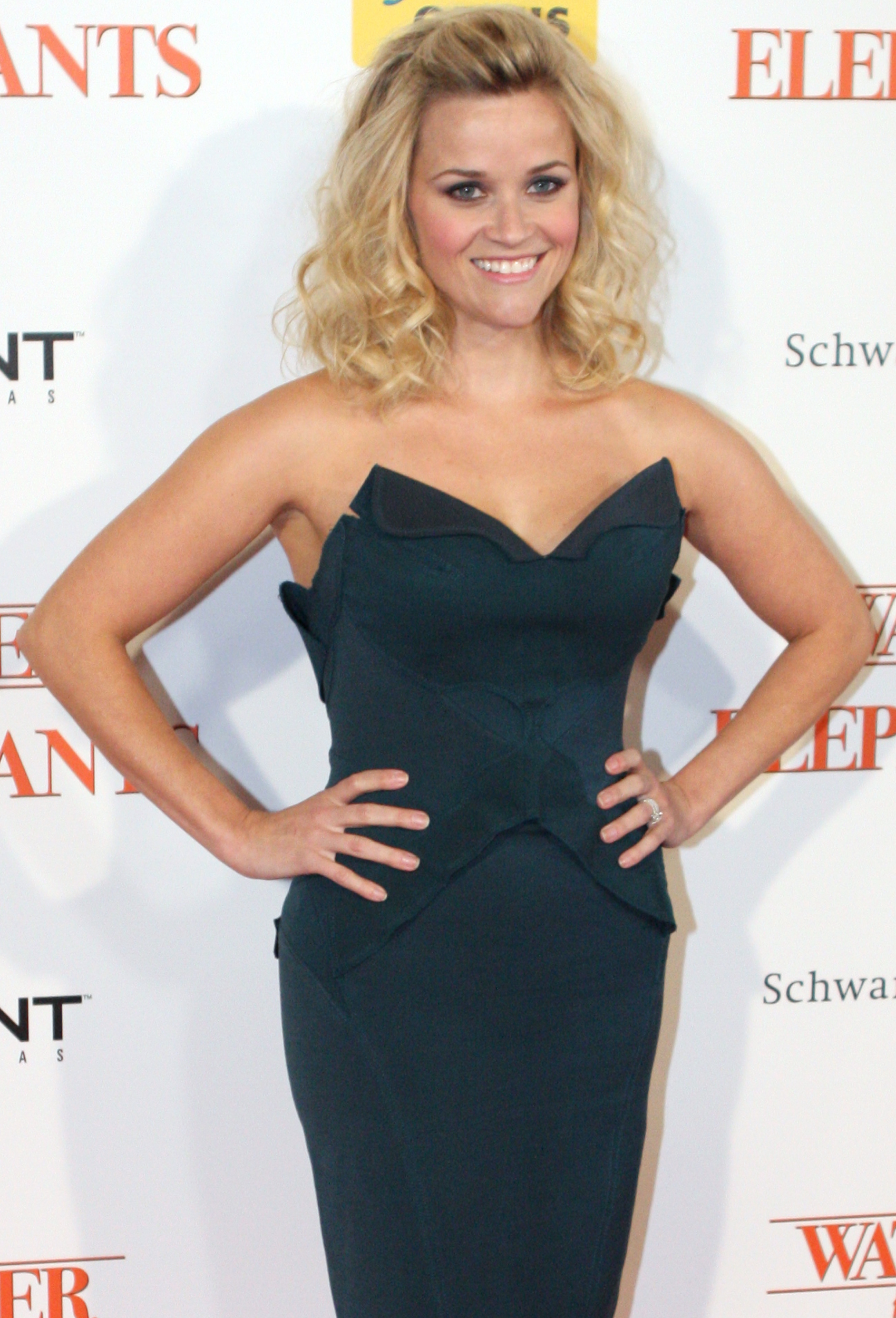
Witherspoon at the premiere of Water for Elephants in 2011

Key
†	Denotes films that have not yet been released

Year	Title	Role	Notes
1991	The Man in the Moon	Dani Trant	
1993	A Far Off Place	Nonnie Parker	
1993	Jack the Bear	Karen Morris	
1994	S.F.W.	Wendy Pfister	
1996	Freeway	Vanessa Lutz	
1996	Fear	Nicole Walker	
1998	Twilight	Mel Ames	
1998	Overnight Delivery	Ivy Miller	
1998	Pleasantville	Jennifer / Mary Sue Parker	
1999	Cruel Intentions	Annette Hargrove	
1999	Election	Tracy Flick	
1999	Best Laid Plans	Lissa	
2000	Little Nicky	Holly	
2000	American Psycho	Evelyn Williams	
2001	The Trumpet of the Swan	Serena	Voice
2001	Legally Blonde	Elle Woods	
2002	The Importance of Being Earnest	Cecily Cardew	
2002	Sweet Home Alabama	Melanie Smooter	
2003	Legally Blonde 2: Red, White & Blonde	Elle Woods	Also executive producer
2004	Vanity Fair	Becky Sharp	
2005	Walk the Line	June Carter Cash	
2005	Just like Heaven	Elizabeth Masterson	
2006	Penelope	Annie	Also producer
2007	Rendition	Isabella Fields El-Ibrahimi	
2008	Four Christmases	Kate Kinkaid	
2009	Monsters vs. Aliens	Susan Murphy / Ginormica	Voice
2009	Legally Blondes	—N/a	Producer
2010	How Do You Know	Lisa Jorgenson	
2011	Water for Elephants	Marlena Rosenbluth	
2012	This Means War	Lauren Scott	
2012	Mud	Juniper	
2013	Devil's Knot	Pamela Hobbs	
2014	Gone Girl	—N/a	Producer
2014	Wild	Cheryl Strayed	Also producer
2014	The Good Lie	Carrie Davis	
2014	Inherent Vice	Penny Kimball	
2015	Hot Pursuit	Officer Rose Cooper	Also producer
2016	Sing	Rosita	Voice
2017	Home Again	Alice Kinney	
2018	A Wrinkle in Time	Mrs. Whatsit	
2019	Lucy in the Sky	—N/a	Producer
2021	Sing 2	Rosita	Voice
2022	Where the Crawdads Sing	—N/a	Producer
2022	Something from Tiffany's	—N/a	Producer
2023	Your Place or Mine	Debbie Dunne	Also producer
2025	You're Cordially Invited	Margot	Also producer
2027	The Nightingale †	—N/a	Producer

== Television ==
Year	Title	Role	Notes
1991	Wildflower	Ellie Perkins	Television film
1992	Desperate Choices: To Save My Child	Cassie Robbins	Television film
1993	Return to Lonesome Dove	Ferris Dunnigan	Miniseries
2000	King of the Hill	Debbie Grund	Voice; 2 episodes
2000	Friends	Jill Green	2 episodes
2001	Saturday Night Live	Host / Various	Episode: "Reese Witherspoon/Alicia Keys"
2002	The Simpsons	Greta Wolfcastle	Voice; Episode: "The Bart Wants What It Wants"
2003	Freedom: A History of Us	Various roles	3 episodes; documentary
2009	Monsters vs. Aliens: Mutant Pumpkins from Outer Space	Susan Murphy / Ginormica	Voice; Special
2015	Saturday Night Live	Host / Various	Episode: "Reese Witherspoon/Florence + the Machine"
2015	Best Time Ever with Neil Patrick Harris	Guest announcer	Episode: "Reese Witherspoon"
2015	The Muppets	Herself	Episode: "Walk the Swine"
2017–2019	Big Little Lies	Madeline Martha Mackenzie	Also executive producer
2017	The Mindy Project	Herself	Episode: "Girl Gone Wild"
2018	Shine On with Reese	Herself	Host; also executive producer
2019–present	The Morning Show	Bradley Jackson	Also executive producer
2020	Little Fires Everywhere	Elena Richardson	Also executive producer
2021	Friends: The Reunion	Herself	TV Special
2023	Daisy Jones & the Six	—N/a	Executive producer
2023	My Kind of Country	Herself	Also executive producer
2023—present	The Last Thing He Told Me	—N/a	Executive producer
2026—present	Elle	—N/a	Executive producer
2026	Lucky	—N/a	Executive producer

== Video games ==
Year	Title	Role	Notes
2009	Monsters vs. Aliens	Susan Murphy / Ginormica	
