= Tiny Beautiful Things (miniseries) =

2023 American comedy drama television miniseries

- Promotional poster
- Genre: Comedy drama
- Created by: Liz Tigelaar
- Based on: Tiny Beautiful Things by Cheryl Strayed
- Directed by: Rachel Lee Goldenberg
- Starring: Kathryn Hahn; Sarah Pidgeon; Quentin Plair; Tanzyn Crawford
- Music by: Ingrid Michaelson; Gabriel Mann; Juan Ariza
- Country of origin: United States
- Original language: English
- No. of episodes: 8

Production
- Executive producers: Liz Tigelaar; Reese Witherspoon; Lauren Neustadter; Laura Dern; Jayme Lemons; Cheryl Strayed; Brian Lindstrom; Stacey Silverman; Kathryn Hahn; Rachel Lee Goldenberg
- Producers: Vail Romeyn; Todd Leykamp; Jocelyn Bioh
- Cinematography: Tobias Datum
- Editors: Garret Price; Phyllis Housen; Rebekah Fridman; Katie Wedemeyer
- Running time: 26–32 minutes
- Production companies: Best Day Ever Productions; Jaywalker Pictures; Hello Sunshine; ABC Signature

Original release
- Network: Hulu
- Release: April 7, 2023

Tiny Beautiful Things is an American comedy drama television miniseries that premiered on Hulu on April 7, 2023. It is based on the 2012 book of the same name by Cheryl Strayed. It has been adapted by Liz Tigelaar and produced by Best Day Ever Productions, Jaywalker Pictures, Hello Sunshine, and ABC Signature. It received generally positive reviews from critics.

The show received two Primetime Emmy Awards nominations for Outstanding Lead Actress in a Limited or Anthology Series or Movie for Kathryn Hahn and Outstanding Supporting Actress in a Limited or Anthology Series or Movie for Merritt Wever.

== Synopsis ==
The show centers on Clare, a writer who reluctantly becomes a popular advice columnist during a period of turmoil in her life.

== Cast and characters ==
=== Main ===
- Kathryn Hahn as Clare Pierce
  - Sarah Pidgeon as younger Clare
- Quentin Plair as Danny Kincade, Clare's husband
- Tanzyn Crawford as Rae Kincade, Clare and Danny's daughter

=== Recurring ===
- Michaela Watkins as Amy Adler, Clare's friend
- Owen Painter as younger Lucas, Clare's younger brother
- Nick Stahl as older Lucas
- Tijuana Ricks as Mel Green, Clare and Danny's couples therapist
- Merritt Wever as Frankie Pierce, Clare's late mother
- Elizabeth Hinkler as Shan, receptionist at the nursing home
- Julien Marlon Samani as Zach Charles, an uber driver
- Johnny Berchtold as Jess, Clare's first husband
- Aneasa Yacoub as Montana, Rae's friend
- Marlow Barkley as Little Clare

== Episodes ==
No.	Title	Directed by	Written by	Original release date
1	"Pilot"	Rachel Lee Goldenberg	Liz Tigelaar	April 7, 2023
2	"Yours Sugar"	Rachel Lee Goldenberg	Nancy Won	April 7, 2023
3	"The Ghost Ship"	Desiree Akhavan	Ellen Fairey	April 7, 2023
4	"Under the Stars"	Desiree Akhavan	Jocelyn Bioh	April 7, 2023
5	"The Nose"	Stacie Passon	Des Moran	April 7, 2023
6	"Broken Things"	Stacie Passon	Naomi Iwamoto	April 7, 2023
7	"Go"	Desiree Akhavan	Deirdre Shaw	April 7, 2023
8	"Love"	Desiree Akhavan	Kaitlyn Fahey	April 7, 2023

== Production ==
Cheryl Strayed had discussed adapting her book of essays Tiny Beautiful Things with Laura Dern and Reese Witherspoon while they worked together making the 2014 film Wild, adapted from Strayed's memoir.

Liz Tigelaar serves as series creator and writer on the project which is being produced by ABC Signature and Hello Sunshine. Tigelaar is also executive producer, alongside Witherspoon, Dern, Lauren Neustadter, Stacey Silverman, Jayme Lemons, Cheryl Strayed, and Kathryn Hahn. Tigelaar described the show as depicting an alternate version of Strayed "that hadn't hiked the Pacific Crest Trail" in Wild.

Hahn was revealed to be playing the role of Clare when it was announced for Hulu in June 2022. In August 2022, Sarah Pidgeon and Tanzyn Crawford were added to the cast.

== Release ==
The series was released on Hulu on April 7, 2023. It also premiered on Disney+ in international territories. In India, the series premiered on Disney+ Hotstar on April 9, 2023.

== Reception ==
=== Critical response ===
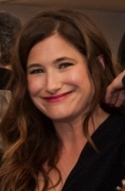
Kathryn Hahn's performance garnered critical acclaim and was nominated for a Primetime Emmy Award.

The review aggregator website Rotten Tomatoes reported an 85% approval rating with an average rating of 7.6/10, based on 40 critic reviews. The website's critics consensus reads, "Tiny Beautiful Things is littered with cumbersome narrative choices, but Kathryn Hahn's soulful performance is one big plus that keeps this adaptation firmly compelling." Metacritic, which uses a weighted average, assigned a score of 73 out of 100 based on 14 critics, indicating "generally favorable reviews".

Joel Keller of Decider asserted, "Kathryn Hahn makes Tiny Beautiful Things a compelling watch, mainly because she's so good at playing someone barely holding things together. But the rest of the series, especially the flashback sequences, give us a pretty full picture of why her character continues to spiral." Taylor Gates of Collider, gave the series a grade of A−, praised the performance of Kathryn Hahn, and complimented the humor of the series, writing, "Tiny Beautiful Things uses specificity to offer commentary on universal experiences and has the unique ability to strip the most complex topics down into their simplest, most resonant parts. And so for that, I have to say: Thank you."

=== Accolades ===
The series was one of 200 television series that received the ReFrame Stamp for the years 2022 to 2023. The stamp is awarded by the gender equity coalition ReFrame and industry database IMDbPro for film and television projects that are proven to have gender-balanced hiring, with stamps being awarded to projects that hire female-identifying people, especially women of color, in four out of eight key roles for their production.

Year	Award	Category	Nominee(s)	Result	Ref.
2023	Golden Trailer Awards	Best Digital - Drama	Tiny Beautiful Things	Nominated	
2023	Primetime Emmy Awards	Outstanding Lead Actress in a Limited or Anthology Series or Movie	Kathryn Hahn	Nominated	
2023	Primetime Emmy Awards	Outstanding Supporting Actress in a Limited or Anthology Series or Movie	Merritt Wever	Nominated	
2023	Sentinel Awards	Depiction of End of Life	Tiny Beautiful Things	Won	
2024	Astra Television Awards	Best Streaming Limited Series	Tiny Beautiful Things	Nominated	
2024	Astra Television Awards	Best Actress in a Limited Series or Streaming Movie	Kathryn Hahn	Nominated	
2024	Astra Television Awards	Best Supporting Actress in a Limited Series or Streaming Movie	Sarah Pidgeon	Nominated	
2024	Astra Television Awards	Best Writing in a Limited Series or Streaming Movie	Liz Tigelaar	Nominated	
2024	Astra Television Awards	Best Directing in a Limited Series or Streaming Movie	Rachel Lee Goldenberg	Nominated	
2024	Satellite Awards	Best Miniseries and Limited Series or Motion Picture Made for Television	Tiny Beautiful Things	Nominated	
2024	Satellite Awards	Best Actress in a Miniseries, Limited Series, or Motion Picture Made for Television	Kathryn Hahn	Nominated	
2024	Satellite Awards	Best Actress in a Supporting Role in a Series, Miniseries and Limited Series, or Motion Picture Made for Television	Merritt Wever	Nominated	
2024	Screen Actors Guild Awards	Outstanding Performance by a Female Actor in a Miniseries or Television Movie	Kathryn Hahn	Nominated	
