= List of awards and nominations received by Reese Witherspoon =

Reese Witherspoon awards and nominations
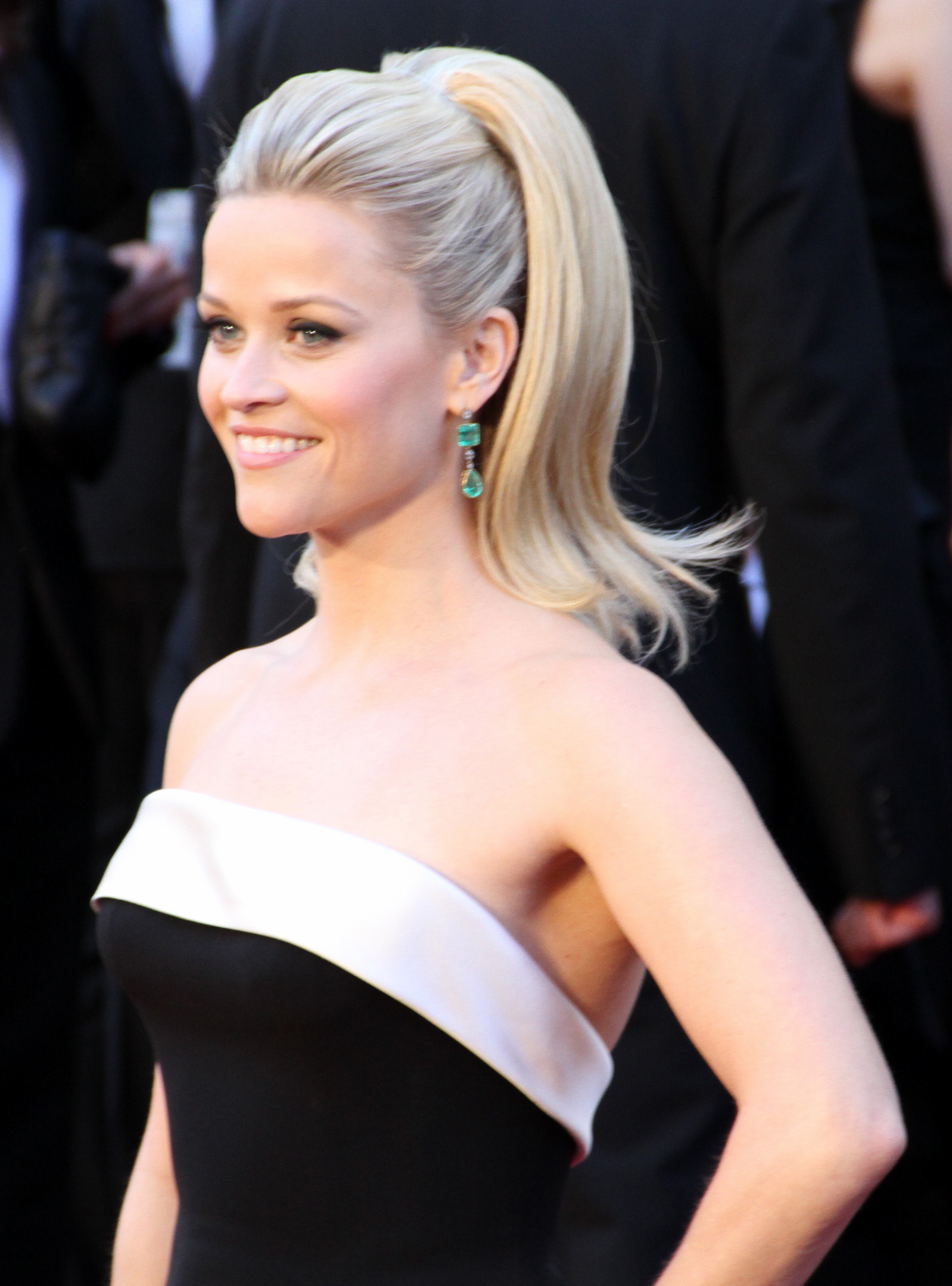
- Witherspoon at the 2011 Academy Awards
Awards and nominations
Award	Wins	Nominations
Academy Awards	1	2
BAFTA Awards	1	3
Primetime Emmy Awards	1	7
Golden Globe Awards	2	7
Screen Actors Guild Awards	1	7

Totals (Note: Certain award groups do not simply award one winner. They acknowledge several different recipients, have runners-up, and have third place. Since this is a specific recognition and is different from losing an award, runner-up mentions are considered wins in this award tally. For simplification and to avoid errors, each award in this list has been presumed to have had a prior nomination.)
- Wins: 33
- Nominations: 88

The following is a list of awards and nominations received by acclaimed American actress and producer Reese Witherspoon. She rose to international fame for portraying Elle Woods in Legally Blonde. Among her numerous accolades, Witherspoon won an Academy Award, BAFTA Award, and Golden Globe Award for her performance in Walk the Line. As a producer, Witherspoon won a Primetime Emmy Award and received Golden Globe award nominations for the television series Big Little Lies.

== Major associations ==
Key
†	Indicates non-competitive categories

=== Academy Awards ===
Year	Category	Nominated work	Result	Ref.
2006	Best Actress	Walk the Line	Won	
2015	Best Actress	Wild	Nominated	

=== BAFTA Awards ===
Year	Category	Nominated work	Result	Ref.
British Academy Film Awards
2006	Best Actress in a Leading Role	Walk the Line	Won	
2015	Best Actress in a Leading Role	Wild	Nominated	
British Academy Television Awards
2018	Best International Programme (Note: Nominated as Executive Producer.)	Big Little Lies	Nominated	

=== Critics Choice Awards ===
Year	Category	Nominated work	Result	Ref.
Critics' Choice Movie Awards
2006	Best Actress	Walk the Line	Won	
2015	Best Actress	Wild	Nominated	
Critics' Choice Television Awards
2018	Best Actress in a Television Movie or Miniseries	Big Little Lies	Nominated	
2018	Best Television Movie or Miniseries	Big Little Lies	Won	
2024	Best Actress in a Drama Series	The Morning Show	Nominated	

=== Golden Globe Awards ===
Year	Category	Nominated work	Result	Ref.
2000	Best Actress in a Motion Picture – Musical or Comedy	Election	Nominated	
2002	Best Actress in a Motion Picture – Musical or Comedy	Legally Blonde	Nominated	
2006	Best Actress in a Motion Picture – Musical or Comedy	Walk the Line	Won	
2015	Best Actress in a Motion Picture – Drama	Wild	Nominated	
2018	Best Actress – Miniseries or Television Film	Big Little Lies	Nominated	
2018	Best Miniseries or Television Film	Big Little Lies	Won	
2020	Best Actress – Television Series Drama	The Morning Show	Nominated	

=== Primetime Emmy Awards ===
Year	Category	Nominated work	Result	Ref.
2017	Outstanding Lead Actress in a Limited Series or Movie	Big Little Lies	Nominated	
2017	Outstanding Limited or Anthology Series	Big Little Lies	Won	
2020	Outstanding Limited or Anthology Series	Little Fires Everywhere	Nominated	
2022	Outstanding Lead Actress in a Drama Series	The Morning Show	Nominated	
2023	Outstanding Limited or Anthology Series	Daisy Jones & the Six	Nominated	
2024	Outstanding Lead Actress in a Drama Series	The Morning Show	Nominated	
2024	Outstanding Drama Series	The Morning Show	Nominated	

=== Screen Actors Guild Awards ===
Year	Category	Nominated work	Result	Ref.
2006	Outstanding Performance by a Female Actor in a Leading Role	Walk the Line	Won	
2015	Outstanding Performance by a Female Actor in a Leading Role	Wild	Nominated	
2018	Outstanding Performance by a Female Actor in Miniseries or Movie	Big Little Lies	Nominated	
2020	Outstanding Performance by an Ensemble in a Drama Series	Big Little Lies	Nominated	
2022	Outstanding Performance by an Ensemble in a Drama Series	The Morning Show	Nominated	
2022	Outstanding Performance by a Female Actor in a Drama Series	The Morning Show	Nominated	
2023	Outstanding Performance by an Ensemble in a Drama Series	The Morning Show	Nominated	

=== Industry awards ===
Organization	Year	Category	Nominated work	Result	Ref.
AACTA Awards	2014	Best Actress	Wild	Nominated	
Independent Spirit Awards	2000	Best Female Lead	Election	Nominated	
Independent Spirit Awards	2014	Robert Altman Award	Mud	Won	
Independent Spirit Awards	2015	Robert Altman Award	Inherent Vice	Won	
Producers Guild of America Awards	2018	Outstanding Producer of Episodic Television, Drama	Big Little Lies	Nominated	
Producers Guild of America Awards	2020	Outstanding Producer of Episodic Television, Drama	Big Little Lies	Nominated	

== Audience awards ==
Organization	Year	Category	Nominated work	Result	Ref.
Nickelodeon Kids' Choice Awards	2002	Favorite Female Movie Star	Legally Blonde	Nominated	
Nickelodeon Kids' Choice Awards	2009	Favorite Movie Actress	Four Christmases	Nominated	
Nickelodeon Kids' Choice Awards	2010	Favorite Voice From an Animated Movie	Monsters vs. Aliens	Nominated	
Nickelodeon Kids' Choice Awards	2017	Favorite Voice From an Animated Movie	Sing	Nominated	
Nickelodeon Kids' Choice Awards	2017	Most Wanted Pet	Sing	Nominated	
Nickelodeon Kids' Choice Awards	2022	Favorite Voice for an Animated Movie	Sing 2	Nominated	
People's Choice Awards	2005	Favorite Female Movie Star		Nominated	
People's Choice Awards	2006	Favorite Leading Actress	Just Like Heaven and Walk the Line	Won	
People's Choice Awards	2006	Olay Total Effects Fans Favorite Look	Herself	Nominated	
People's Choice Awards	2008	Favorite Female Movie Star		Won	
People's Choice Awards	2009	Favorite Female Movie Star		Won	
People's Choice Awards	2012	Favorite Movie Actress		Nominated	
People's Choice Awards	2013	Favorite Comedic Movie Actress		Nominated	
People's Choice Awards	2015	Favorite Dramatic Movie Actress		Nominated	
People's Choice Awards	2019	The Female TV Star of 2019	Big Little Lies	Nominated	
People's Choice Awards	2019	The Drama TV Star of 2019	Big Little Lies	Nominated	
Teen Choice Awards	1999	Choice Movie Actress	Cruel Intentions	Nominated	
Teen Choice Awards	1999	Choice Movie Hissy Fit	Election	Nominated	
Teen Choice Awards	1999	Most Funniest Scene	Pleasantville	Nominated (Note: Shared with Joan Allen.)	
Teen Choice Awards	1999	Sexiest Love Scene	Cruel Intentions	Nominated (Note: Shared with Ryan Phillippe.)	
Teen Choice Awards	1999	Choice Female Hottie	Herself	Nominated	
Teen Choice Awards	2001	Choice Movie: Hissy Fit	Legally Blonde	Nominated	
Teen Choice Awards	2002	Choice Movie Actress: Comedy	The Importance of Being Earnest	Nominated	
Teen Choice Awards	2002	Choice Female Hottie	Herself	Nominated	
Teen Choice Awards	2002	Extraordinary Achievement Award	Herself	Won	
Teen Choice Awards	2003	Choice Movie Actress: Comedy	Sweet Home Alabama	Nominated	
Teen Choice Awards	2003	Choice Movie Liplock	Sweet Home Alabama	Won (Note: Shared with Josh Lucas.)	
Teen Choice Awards	2006	Choice Movie Actress: Action/Drama	Walk the Line	Won	
Teen Choice Awards	2008	Choice Movie: Drama Actress	Rendition	Nominated	
Teen Choice Awards	2011	Choice Movie Actress: Drama	Water for Elephants	Nominated	
Teen Choice Awards	2012	Choice Movie Actress: Comedy	This Means War	Nominated	
Teen Choice Awards	2015	Choice Movie Actress: Drama	Wild	Nominated	
Teen Choice Awards	2015	Choice Movie Actress: Comedy	Hot Pursuit	Nominated	
Teen Choice Awards	2015	Choice Movie: Chemistry	Hot Pursuit	Nominated (Note: Shared with Sofía Vergara.)	
Teen Choice Awards	2015	Choice Movie: Liplock	Hot Pursuit	Nominated	
Teen Choice Awards	2015	Choice Movie: Hissy Fit	Hot Pursuit	Nominated	
Teen Choice Awards	2018	Choice Fantasy Movie Actress	A Wrinkle in Time	Nominated	

== Critic awards ==
Organization	Year (Note: Indicates the year of the ceremony.)	Category	Nominated work	Result	Ref.
Alliance of Women Film Journalists	2011	Actress Most in Need of a New Agent		Nominated	
Alliance of Women Film Journalists	2013	Actress Most in Need of a New Agent	This Means War	Won (Note: Tied with Katherine Heigl for One for the Money.)	
Alliance of Women Film Journalists	2019	Outstanding Achievement by a Woman in the Film Industry (Note: Shared with Shonda Rimes and all the women speaking out in the #MeToo movement.)	Herself	Nominated	
Austin Film Critics Association	2006	Best Actress	Walk the Line	Won	
Boston Society of Film Critics	2005	Best Actress	Walk the Line	Won	
Chlotrudis Society for Independent Film	2000	Best Actress	Election	Nominated	
Dallas–Fort Worth Film Critics Association	2005	Best Actress	Walk the Line	Nominated	
Dallas–Fort Worth Film Critics Association	2014	Best Actress	Wild	Won	
Denver Film Critics Society	2015	Best Actress	Wild	Nominated	
Detroit Film Critics Society	2014	Best Actress	Wild	Nominated	
Florida Film Critics Circle	2005	Best Actress	Walk the Line	Won	
Houston Film Critics Society	2015	Best Actress	Wild	Nominated	
National Society of Film Critics	1999	Best Actress	Election	Won	
Online Film Critics Society	2000	Best Actress	Election	Won	
Online Film Critics Society	2006	Best Actress	Walk the Line	Won	
Toronto Film Critics Association	2014	Best Actress	Wild	Nominated	
Utah Film Critics Association	2005	Best Actress	Walk the Line	Won	
Women Film Critics Circle	2014	Courage in Acting	Wild	Nominated	
Women's Image Network Awards	2014	Actress Feature Film	Wild	Won	

== Festival awards ==
Organization	Year	Category	Nominated work	Result	Ref.
Cognac Festival du Film Policier	1997	Best Actress	Freeway	Won	
Palm Springs International Film Festival	2015	Chairman's Award	Wild	Won	
Sitges Film Festival	1997	Best Actress	Freeway	Won	

== Miscellaneous awards ==
Organization	Year	Category	Nominated work	Result	Ref.
American Comedy Awards	2000	Funniest Actress in a Motion Picture (Leading Role)	Election	Nominated	
American Comedy Awards	2001	Funniest Female Guest Appearance in a TV Series	Friends	Nominated	
Blockbuster Entertainment Awards	2000	Favorite Supporting Actress - Drama/Romance	Cruel Intentions	Won	
Gracie Awards	2018	Outstanding Female Actor in a Leading Role in a Drama	Big Little Lies	Won	
Rembrandt Awards	2012	Best International Actress	Water for Elephants	Nominated	
Young Artist Awards	1991	Best Young Actress Starring in a Motion Picture	The Man in the Moon	Nominated	
Young Artist Awards	1993	Best Young Actress in a Television Movie	Desperate Choices: To Save My Child	Nominated	
Young Artist Awards	1994	Best Youth Actress Co-Starring in a Motion Picture: Drama	Jack the Bear	Won	
Young Hollywood Awards	1999	Breakthrough Performance - Female	Pleasantville	Won	
