= Draper James =

American clothing line launched by Reese Witherspoon

Draper James is a clothing line launched by actress Reese Witherspoon, founded in 2015. A nod to Witherspoon’s Southern upbringing, the line aims to "emphasize [Witherspoon's] southern roots and personal style". The name is in honor of Witherspoon’s grandparents, Dorothea Draper and William James Witherspoon.

On September 6, 2023, private investment firm Consortium Brand Partners acquired the lifestyle brand.

== History ==
Draper James launched with products available in May 2015 under the supervision of former president of Burch Creative Capital, Andrea Hyde, and an initial $7 million in seed investment. In October 2015, Draper James announced a $10 million round of investment funding from early-stage investment firm, Forerunner Ventures.

In October 2015, Draper James launched its first brick and mortar store in Witherspoon’s hometown of Nashville, Tennessee. The second store opened in Dallas, Texas in September 2016. The Dallas location was moved to a popup in Southlake, Texas in September 2019. In May 2017, the Lexington, Kentucky location opened at The Summit at Fritz Farm. In December 2017, they opened in Atlanta Georgia at the Shops Around Lenox in Buckhead.

Draper James has been featured in People, Vanity Fair, Oprah Magazine, and Coveteur, among others, and the signature "totes y'all" bag was seen in the Gilmore Girls Revival.

In March 2017, Draper James was voted "Best Shop in Tennessee" by Southern Living. That same month, Draper James launched a partnership with beauty-subscription service Birchbox.

In April 2017, Draper James partnered with sandal brand Jack Rogers to launch three different styles of the classic Jack Rogers sandal. Draper James and Net-a-Porter announced a partnership in May 2017.

In September 2017, Taylor Rettig replaced Hyde as the company's CEO.

Draper James hired Kathryn Sukey as the new head of design, whose first collection debuted in Spring of 2019. Sukey also designed the first in-house plus size collection for the brand.

In February 2022, they dropped a new line in partnership with Kohl's.

In August 2023, Consortium Brand Partners acquired a 70% stake in the company for an undisclosed amount.

== Products ==
The line features a wide range of clothing, accessories and home decor designed to “embrace the beauty and style and excitement that embodies what is happening in the South today,” with prices geared more toward high-end shoppers.

Products often feature slang common to the Southeast United States, such as a tote bag with the phrase “totes y’all” imprinted on the bag.
