= Type A Films =

Film production company

- Company type: Private
- Industry: Production company
- Founded: 2000; 26 years ago
- Founder: Reese Witherspoon; Debra Siegel
- Fate: Merged with Bruna Papandrea's Make Movies
- Successor: Pacific Standard
- Key people: Jennifer Simpson (President)

Type A Films was a film production company founded by Debra Siegel and actress and producer Reese Witherspoon in 2000.

== Name ==
The media believed Type A Films was named after a nickname from Witherspoon’s childhood, "Little Miss Type A". However, when asked about the company by Interview magazine, she clarified the name's origin: "... people think I named it after myself... It was actually an in-joke with my family because at [age] 7 I understood complicated medical terms, such as the difference between type A and type B personalities. But I just wished I'd named the company Dogfood Films or Fork or something. You carry that baggage all your life."

== History ==
Witherspoon wanted to start her own company to be able to produce quality films for young women. Her success with Legally Blonde allowed Type A Films to expand and get more recognition in the industry. Before Jennifer Simpson became its president in 2002, she was the head of development and production for Barry Mendel Productions where she worked on films, such as The Sixth Sense and The Royal Tenenbaums.

In 2012, the company merged with Bruna Papandrea's Make Movies banner to create a new production company entitled Pacific Standard. In November 2016, Witherspoon, Seth Rodsky and Otter Media formed Hello Sunshine, of which Pacific Standard became a subsidiary.

== Filmography ==
Year	Title	Director	Gross (worldwide)	Notes
2001	Legally Blonde	Robert Luketic	$141.8 million	
2003	Legally Blonde 2: Red, White & Blonde	Charles Herman-Wurmfeld	$124.9 million	
2006	Penelope	Mark Palansky	$21.2 million	
2008	Four Christmases	Seth Gordon	$163.7 million	
2009	Legally Blondes	Savage Steve Holland	—N/a	
