= McGregor High School =

Location
- 148 S 2nd St; McGregor, Minnesota 55760; United States; 46.605946°N 93.3054968°W

Information
- Teaching staff: 16.13 (FTE)
- Grades: 7–12
- Enrollment: 210 (2023–2024)
- Student to teacher ratio: 13.02
- Campus type: rural
- Colors: Black and white
- Mascot: Mercuries
- Teams: Mercs
- Website: www.mcgregor.k12.mn.us

McGregor High School (MHS) is a public high school located in McGregor, Minnesota, United States. It is K-12 and houses about 500 students and 50 faculty. The school colors are black and white and the school mascot is Mercury, the Roman god of speed.

In 1997 it was discovered that the business manager and another employee of the school had been embezzling funds, leaving a deficit of about $550,000. To keep the school open, the community voted to raise property taxes, and in three years' time administrators managed to balance the budget. They also raised money for large building projects including new classrooms and an auditorium.

== Notable alumni ==
- Cheryl Strayed (class of 1986) – American memoirist, novelist, essayist and podcast host
