= Tiny Beautiful Things =

2012 book by Cheryl Strayed

- First edition cover
- Author: Cheryl Strayed
- Language: English
- Genre: Self-help
- Publisher: Vintage Books
- Publication date: July 10, 2012
- Media type: Print (hardback, paperback); Ebook; Audiobook
- Pages: 368 (paperback)
- ISBN: 978-0-3079-4933-2

Tiny Beautiful Things: Advice on Love and Life from Dear Sugar is a 2012 self-help book by American author and podcaster Cheryl Strayed. Tiny Beautiful Things is a collection of essays compiled from Strayed's "Dear Sugar" advice column, which she wrote anonymously, on The Rumpus, an online literary magazine. The columns focus as much on her literary memoir as they do on advice and self-help.

The book was published on July 10, 2012, by Vintage Books, a division of Random House Publishing, and debuted at No. 5 on the New York Times Best Seller list in the advice and self-help category.

== "Dear Sugar" column ==
The book is a collection of essays from "Dear Sugar", Strayed's advice column on The Rumpus. Strayed took over this column, under the pseudonym "Sugar", on March 11, 2010. It was created and previously written by her friend, Steve Almond. She wrote for the column anonymously and without pay until the column ended in 2012, months before Tiny Beautiful Things was published. As Sugar, Strayed responded to anonymous questions with searing honesty. She drew from her own life experiences in her letters and shared them in raw detail, both the good and the bad. She once said, "I’ve always written the column as if I were a naked woman standing in a field showing you everything but her face." In February, 2012, Strayed revealed her true identity as Sugar.

Tiny Beautiful Things is a compilation of columns chosen by Strayed, including both her favorite and most popular essays. The book also includes essays that were never published on the website.

== Reception ==
Tiny Beautiful Things has been reviewed by journalists on staff at The Washington Post, The New York Times Book Review, the San Francisco Chronicle, and The Huffington Post.

== Dear Sugars podcast ==
Strayed revived her Sugar persona in a podcast called Dear Sugars, which she hosted alongside "Dear Sugar" creator, Steve Almond. It ran for four years, the final episode airing in September 2018. The podcast was produced by The New York Times and WBUR, Boston's NPR affiliate.

In April 2020, in response to an outpouring of requests from readers for her to revive her Sugar persona yet again, Strayed premiered her newest podcast, "Sugar Calling". In each episode of this podcast, Sugar asks questions in conversation with a different author over the age of 60. This second podcast, recorded over Google Hangouts, is intended to provide relief during the COVID-19 pandemic.

== Stage adaptations ==
The book was conceived as a play, Tiny Beautiful Things, by Nia Vardalos, Thomas Kail, and Marshall Heyman. The stage adaptation, written by Vardalos and directed by Kail, premiered at The Public Theater in December, 2016 to a sold-out run, starring Vardalos as Sugar. Other members of this original cast include Phillip James Brannon, Alfredo Narciso, and Natalie Woolams-Torres.

Vardalos reprised her performance at The Public in September 2017 for an extended return engagement.

The play received its Canadian premiere in Kelowna, British Columbia, under the direction of Pete MacLeod for MadFox Theatre in February 2023. The production starred Michelle Deighton in the role of Sugar, with supporting performances from Casey Easton, Angela Schjodt, and Mikayla Jones. The run received critical acclaim and sold out all performances.

Tiny Beautiful Things, adapted for the stage by Nia Vardalos, will be performed at the Belvoir Theatre in Surry Hills, New South Wales, featuring a diverse cast and directed by Lee Lewis.

== Television adaptation ==
In June 2022, Hulu ordered a television series adaptation of the book, starring Kathryn Hahn. The miniseries premiered on April 7, 2023.
