= Torch (novel) =

2006 novel by Cheryl Strayed

- Author: Cheryl Strayed
- Language: English
- Genre: Fiction
- Publisher: Houghton Mifflin Harcourt
- English publication date: February 1, 2006
- Media type: print, digital, audio
- Pages: 336 (hardcover)
- ISBN: 978-0618472178

Torch is the debut novel of American author Cheryl Strayed. Published in 2006 by Houghton Mifflin Harcourt, the book was a finalist for the Great Lakes Book Award and was selected by The Oregonian as one of the top ten books of 2006 by writers living in the Pacific Northwest. The book presents the story of family crisis and grief through the failing health and subsequent death of a mother of two children in Minnesota. The book is loosely based on the real life of the author.

== Reception ==
Torch has been reviewed by journalists on staff at the San Francisco Chronicle, The Austin Chronicle, Entertainment Weekly, Curled Up, Kirkus Reviews, and Publishers Weekly.
