= Cheryl Strayed =

American writer (born 1968)

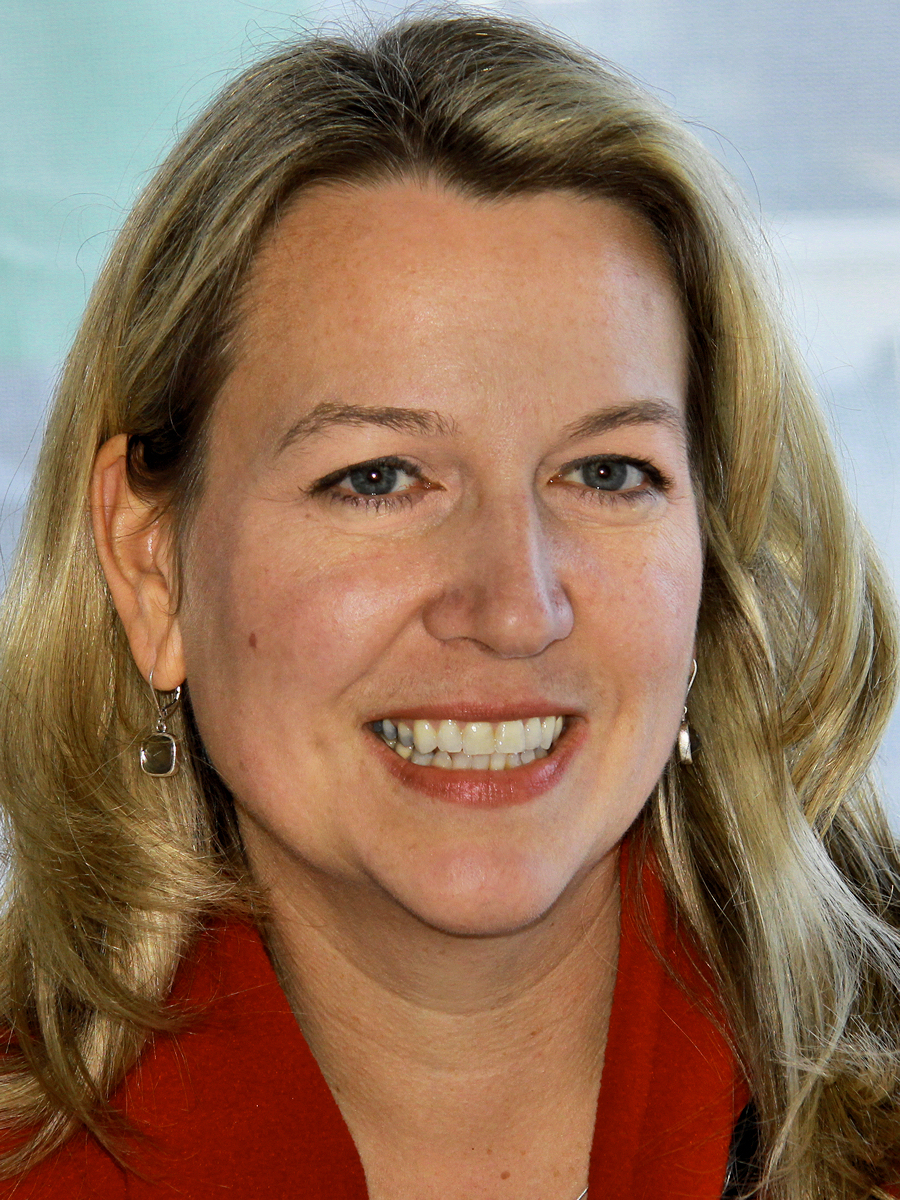
- Strayed in 2012
- Born: Cheryl Nyland; September 17, 1968 (age 58); Spangler, Pennsylvania, U.S.
- Education: University of St. Thomas; University of Minnesota (BA); Syracuse University (MFA)
- Occupations: Writer; speaker; podcast host
- Spouses: Marco Littig (m. 1988; div. 1995) Brian Lindstrom (m. 1999; died 2026)
- Children: 2
- Writing career
- Subjects: Memoir, fiction, personal essays, advice
- Notable works: Torch; Tiny Beautiful Things: Advice on Love and Life from Dear Sugar; Wild: From Lost to Found on the Pacific Crest Trail; Brave Enough

Cheryl Strayed (/ˈstreɪd/; née Nyland; born September 17, 1968) is an American writer and podcast host. She has written four books: the novel Torch (2006) and the nonfiction books Wild: From Lost to Found on the Pacific Crest Trail (2012), Tiny Beautiful Things (2012), and Brave Enough (2015). Wild, the story of Strayed's 1995 hike up the Pacific Crest Trail, is an international bestseller and was adapted into the 2014 Academy Award-nominated film Wild.

== Early life ==
Strayed was born in Spangler, Pennsylvania, the second daughter of Barbara Anne "Bobbi" (née Young; 1945–1991) and Ronald Nyland. From age three to six, Strayed was sexually abused by her paternal grandfather. At age six, her family moved from Pennsylvania to Chaska, Minnesota. Her parents divorced soon after and Cheryl's father left her life. When Cheryl was 12 her mother married Glenn Lambrecht, and the following year the family moved to rural Aitkin County, where they lived in a house that they built themselves on 40 acres. The house did not have electricity or running water for the first few years. Indoor plumbing was installed after Strayed moved away for college. Strayed also has two half-siblings from her father's second marriage, with whom she connected only after Wild was published.

In 1986, at the age of 17, Strayed graduated from McGregor High School in McGregor, Minnesota. During the summer of 1987, Strayed worked as a newspaper reporter for her hometown county weekly, the Aitkin Independent Age in Aitkin, Minnesota. She loosely based the fictional Coltrap County in her novel Torch on McGregor and Aitkin County. Strayed attended her freshman year of college at the University of St. Thomas in Saint Paul, but by her sophomore year, she transferred to the University of Minnesota in Minneapolis, where she received her Bachelor of Arts degree, with a double major in English and Women's Studies.

In March 1991, when Strayed was a senior in college, her mother, Bobbi Lambrecht, died suddenly of lung cancer at the age of 45. Strayed has described this loss as her "genesis story." She has written about her mother's death and her grief in each of her books and several of her essays. She has also written about her experiences dabbling in heroin use in her twenties.

Strayed worked as a waitress, youth advocate, political organizer, temporary office employee, and emergency medical technician throughout her 20s and early 30s, while writing and often traveling around the United States. In 2002, she earned a Master of Fine Arts in fiction writing from Syracuse University, where her mentors were writers George Saunders, Arthur Flowers, Mary Gaitskill, and Mary Caponegro.

== Career ==
The beautiful thing about going alone is that every triumph is yours, every consequence of every mistake is yours, everything that you have to figure out is on you. That’s a really powerful experience. And sometimes it is beautiful and positive and exciting, and sometimes it's negative and hard and lonely. I wanted that. I welcomed that.

— Cheryl Strayed, 2019

Strayed writes the Dear Sugar advice column, which is published in her online newsletter. She first began writing the column on the website The Rumpus starting in March 2010, when the column's originator Steve Almond asked her to take over for him. She wrote the column anonymously until February 14, 2012, when she revealed her identity as "Sugar" at a "Coming Out Party" hosted by the Rumpus at the Verdi Club in San Francisco.

In addition to her column and books, Strayed has published essays in The Washington Post Magazine, The New York Times Magazine, Vogue, Tin House, The Missouri Review, and The Sun Magazine. Her work has been selected three times for inclusion in The Best American Essays ("Heroin/e" in the 2000 edition, "The Love of My Life" in the 2003 edition, and "My Uniform" in the 2015 edition). Strayed was the guest editor of The Best American Essays 2013 and The Best American Travel Writing 2018. She won a Pushcart Prize for her essay "Munro Country," which was originally published in The Missouri Review. The essay is about a letter Strayed received from Alice Munro when she was a young writer, and Munro's influence on Strayed's writing.

Strayed's first book, the novel Torch, was published by Houghton Mifflin Harcourt in February 2006 to positive critical reviews. Torch was a finalist for the Great Lakes Book Award and selected by The Oregonian as one of the top ten books of 2006 by writers living in the Pacific Northwest. In October 2012, Torch was re-issued by Vintage Books with a new introduction by Strayed.

Strayed's second book, the memoir Wild: From Lost to Found on the Pacific Crest Trail, was published in the United States by Alfred A. Knopf on March 20, 2012. It details her 1,100-mile hike in 1995 on the Pacific Crest Trail from the Mojave Desert to the Oregon–Washington state line and tells the story of the personal struggles that compelled her to take the hike. The week of its publication, Wild debuted at number 7 on the New York Times Best Seller list in hardcover non-fiction.

In June 2012, Oprah Winfrey announced that Wild was her first selection for her new Oprah's Book Club 2.0. Winfrey discussed Wild in her video announcement of the new club and interviewed Strayed for a two-hour broadcast of her show Super Soul Sunday on the Oprah Winfrey Network. The next month Wild reached number 1 on the New York Times Best Seller list, a spot it held for seven consecutive weeks. The paperback edition of Wild, published by Vintage Books in March 2013, spent 126 weeks on the New York Times Best Seller list. The book has also been a bestseller around the world—in the UK, Germany, Australia, Brazil, Spain, Portugal, Denmark and elsewhere, and has been translated into 37 languages. Wild won the Barnes & Noble Discover Award and the Oregon Book Award.

Three months before Wild was published, actress Reese Witherspoon optioned it for her production company, Pacific Standard. Nick Hornby wrote the screenplay, and the film Wild was released in 2014, with Witherspoon portraying Strayed. The film was a box office hit, grossing $52.5 million, and led to Academy Award nominations for both Witherspoon and actress Laura Dern, who played Strayed's mother.

In July 2012, Vintage Books published Strayed's third book: Tiny Beautiful Things: Advice on Love and Life from Dear Sugar, a selection of her 2010–2012 "Dear Sugar" online advice columns. The book debuted in the advice and self-help category on the New York Times Best Seller list at number 5 and it has also been published internationally. In November 2022 a tenth anniversary edition of Tiny Beautiful Things was published with six additional columns and a new preface by Strayed. The book again appeared on the New York Times bestseller list.

Tiny Beautiful Things was adapted for the stage by Nia Vardalos, who also starred in the role of Sugar/Cheryl. The play was directed by Thomas Kail and debuted at The Public Theater in New York City in 2016 and 2017. It is now being staged in several theaters around the nation. In June 2022, Hulu ordered a television series adaptation of the book. The show was released to critical acclaim on April 7, 2023. Strayed was a writer and executive producer on the show.

Strayed's fourth book, Brave Enough, was published in the United States by Knopf on October 27, 2015, and in the United Kingdom a week later by Atlantic Books. It debuted in the advice and self-help category on the New York Times Best Seller list at number 10.

Strayed is also a public speaker and gives lectures about her life and books. She travels internationally to meet at writers retreats and lead writing seminars. In 2017, she taught a writing workshop to students at BlinkNow Foundation's Kopila Valley School in Surkhet, Nepal; the conversations she had with girls at the school led her to make a short film on the topic of chhaupadi, a form of menstrual taboo which prohibits Hindu women and girls from participating in normal family activities while menstruating.

Strayed has hosted two hit podcasts for The New York Times. From 2014 to 2018 she co-hosted Dear Sugars with Steve Almond. The podcast was produced by The New York Times and WBUR, Boston's National Public Radio affiliate.

The New York Times Company announced the launch of the podcast Sugar Calling on April 3, 2020. The first episode of the show was an interview with George Saunders. The podcasts were inspired by Strayed's advice column on The Rumpus called "Dear Sugar." The podcast began during the COVID-19 pandemic and focused on the advice authors over the age of 60 had for coping.

== Accolades ==
In August 2019, Strayed was one of ten women for whom statues were constructed in New York as part of Statues for Equality, a project conceived to balance gender representation in public art.

== Personal life ==
Strayed married Marco Littig in August 1988, a month before her 20th birthday. They divorced in 1995, shortly before she started hiking the Pacific Crest Trail. Following the divorce, she changed her surname to Strayed, a name she chose after months of contemplation. She chose Strayed for its symbolism and because she liked how it sounded together with her first name.

Strayed subsequently married filmmaker Brian Lindstrom in August 1999. They have two children and live in east Portland, Oregon, where Strayed has lived since the mid-1990s. Her daughter, Bobbi Strayed Lindstrom, played the younger version of Strayed in the film adaptation of Wild. Brian Lindstrom died May 15, 2026 from progressive supranuclear palsy.

A long-time feminist activist, Strayed worked in her twenties as a political organizer for the Abortion Rights Council of Minnesota, which is now called Minnesota NARAL, and also for Women Against Military Madness, a feminist peace and justice nonprofit organization in Minneapolis–Saint Paul. She served on the first board of directors for Vida: Women in Literary Arts and has been active in many feminist and progressive causes.

== Works ==
=== Novels ===
- Torch, Houghton Mifflin Harcourt, 336 pages. ISBN 978-0618472178 (2006). Republished with new introduction by the author, Vintage Contemporaries, 432 pages. ISBN 978-0345805614 (2012)

=== Non-fiction ===
Autobiographies

- Wild: From Lost to Found on the Pacific Crest Trail, Knopf, 336 pages. ISBN 978-0307592736 (2012)

Self-help

- Tiny Beautiful Things: Advice on Love and Life from Dear Sugar, Vintage Books, 368 pages. ISBN 978-0307949332 (2012)
- Brave Enough, Knopf, 160 pages. ISBN 978-1101946909 (2015)

== Adaptations ==
- Wild (2014), film directed by Jean-Marc Vallée, based on autobiography Wild: From Lost to Found on the Pacific Crest Trail
- Tiny Beautiful Things (TV series) (2023)
