= Hello Sunshine (company) =

American media company

- Type: Private
- Industry: Media, Film & Television
- Founded: 2016; 10 years ago
- Founder: Reese Witherspoon; Seth Rodsky
- Headquarters: Los Angeles, California, United States
- Key people: Reese Witherspoon (principal); Sarah Harden (CEO); Lauren Levy Neustadter (president, Film & TV)
- Services: Film production; television production
- Owners: Reese Witherspoon; Seth Rodsky; Mediawan; Emerson Collective
- Subsidiaries: Pacific Standard; Hello Sunshine Channel
- Website: hello-sunshine.com

Hello Sunshine is an American media company founded by actress Reese Witherspoon and Strand Equity founder and managing partner Seth Rodsky in 2016.

== History ==
In 2000, Witherspoon founded production company Type A Films, which she merged with Bruna Papandrea's Make Movies banner to create a new production company titled Pacific Standard in 2012. Together, they produced the Oscar-nominated films Gone Girl and Wild, and the HBO drama series Big Little Lies. In 2016, Witherspoon and Papandrea split up, with Witherspoon gaining full control over the company.

In November 2016, Witherspoon and Seth Rodsky formed Hello Sunshine as a joint venture with Otter Media, the joint venture between media executive Peter Chernin's The Chernin Group and AT&T, with a focus on telling female-driven stories on film, TV and digital platforms. The company hired media and tech industry executive Kerry Tucker to lead as CEO. Sarah Harden replaced Tucker as CEO the next year. In March 2017, Lauren Levy Neustadter was appointed Head of Film and Television. She has since been promoted to President of Film and TV.

Pacific Standard, the production company Witherspoon co-founded with Bruna Papandrea in 2012, is now a subsidiary of Hello Sunshine.

In addition to producing content, Hello Sunshine also curates a book club called Reese's Book Club x Hello Sunshine. Witherspoon announces a new book pick every month on her Instagram and the book club is aimed to bring women's stories forward. The book club has over 3 million followers on Instagram, and more than 70,000 followers on Facebook. Hello Sunshine also had a Filmmaker Lab to teach 20 girls aged 13–18 the art of film making.

On July 10, 2018, its co-owner, AT&T, through its communications division, announced the launch of a Hello Sunshine-branded cable and satellite television channel, Hello Sunshine Channel, which will be focused on women, similar to Oprah Winfrey Network.

On social media platforms Facebook Watch and IGTV, Hello Sunshine has released three short-form unscripted series focussing on female successes. In April 2018, Hello Sunshine launched the podcast How It Is, hosted by American actress Diane Guerrero. A second season of the podcast launched in October 2018. In November 2018, the third season of How It Is premiered with Kelly McCreary taking over as host.

In July 2018, Hello Sunshine launched the talk show Shine On with Reese on DirecTV hosted by Witherspoon in her first unscripted series. The show presents one-on-one interviews between Witherspoon and various female guests focussing on how they achieved their dreams.

In October 2018, Hello Sunshine launched a new podcast titled My Best Break-Up which is hosted by Irish comedian Maeve Higgins.

In November 2018, Hello Sunshine partnered with Together Live to create the tour Hello Sunshine x Together Live. The tour went to ten different cities across the United States and featured multiple guest speakers telling their story including Halima Aden, MILCK, Yara Shahidi, Uma Thurman, Nicole Byer, Cameron Esposito, Sonequa Martin-Green and Sophia Bush. Highlights from the tour will be featured in the third forthcoming podcast And Especially You which will be hosted by guest speaker Sophia Bush.

In February 2019, Hello Sunshine received an investment from Laurene Powell Jobs' Emerson Collective. Otter Media has also increased its stake in the company.

In early August 2021, Witherspoon (after considering selling the company and hearing the interest of Apple) sold part of the company to a Blackstone backed media company, Candle Media, led by former Disney executives Kevin A. Mayer and Tom Staggs for $900 million. The transaction resulted in Witherspoon and Harden retaining a stake in the new company and a seat on the board. Hello Sunshine shut down its kids and animation unit in February 2023, with the company expected to work with fellow Candle Media subsidiary Moonbug Entertainment moving forward. In July 2024, Candle Media consolidated its live action properties under Candle Studios. Current Hello Sunshine CEO Sarah Harden was named head of the new division.

It was announced in October 2026 that Witherspoon and Mediawan reacquired Hello Sunshine from Candle Media. Industry reports said the company was bought for a fraction of the original $900 million valuation. Later in the month, Hello Sunshine laid off roughly 30 employees—around half of its staff—in a company restructuring that pivoted away from direct-to-consumer sales.

=== Upcoming projects ===
Witherspoon and Bruna Papandrea will continue to produce the projects they have in development together including Luckiest Girl Alive at Lionsgate/Summit, All Is Not Forgotten at Warner Bros, and Ashley's War at Fox 2000. They also will continue to work together under Pacific Standard's overall deal at ABC.

In May 2017, it was reported Hello Sunshine has set up to produce two novels, Eleanor Oliphant Is Completely Fine by Gail Honeyman and Something in the Water by Catherine Steadman. Furthermore, it was announced that Hello Sunshine was filming a documentary about Martina Navratilova.

Hello Sunshine has acquired film rights to the novel The Gilded Years. Zendaya has signed to star in the adaptation which will be called A White Lie and Witherspoon will star and produce Legally Blonde 3 which was scheduled to premiere on Valentine's Day 2020, but has since been delayed indefinitely. In November 2018, it was announced that Hello Sunshine will produce the novel League of Wives as a feature film with Fox 2000 but due to the dissolution of Fox 2000 following the acquisition of 21st Century Fox by Disney, the fate of the project is unknown as of February 2020.

As of February 2020, Hello Sunshine has six television series in development at six different networks including Apple TV+, Hulu, Amazon Prime Video, ABC, Starz and Netflix. Witherspoon will star in one show and will serve as an executive producer on all six shows.

In March 2022, it was announced that Hello Sunshine would produce Run, Rose, Run, a film adaptation of a novel written by Dolly Parton and James Patterson. Parton was tipped to star in the film but died before production began.

In August 2022, the company opened an unscripted division in the United Kingdom.

== Films ==
| Year | Title | Director | Gross (worldwide) | Notes |
|---|---|---|---|---|
| 2014 | Wild | Jean-Marc Vallée | $52.5 million | Produced as Pacific Standard; Nominated for two Academy Awards |
| 2014 | Gone Girl | David Fincher | $369.3 million | Produced as Pacific Standard; Nominated for one Academy Award |
| 2015 | Hot Pursuit | Anne Fletcher | $51.7 million | Produced as Pacific Standard |
| 2019 | Lucy in the Sky | Noah Hawley | $325,950 | Produced as Pacific Standard |
| 2022 | Where the Crawdads Sing | Olivia Newman | $140.2 million | |
| 2022 | Something from Tiffany's | Daryl Wein | —N/a | Debut film for Hello Sunshine; Co-produced with Amazon Studios |
| 2023 | Your Place or Mine | Aline Brosh McKenna | —N/a | |
| 2025 | You're Cordially Invited | Nicholas Stoller | —N/a | |
| 2027 | The Nightingale | Michael Morris | —N/a | |

== Television ==
| Year | Title | Network | Notes |
|---|---|---|---|
| 2017–present | Big Little Lies | HBO | Produced as Pacific Standard; Season 1: Nominated for sixteen Emmy Awards, won eight |
| 2018 | Shine On with Reese | DirecTV | |
| 2018 | Master the Mess | DirecTV | |
| 2019–present | The Morning Show | Apple TV+ | |
| 2019–2023 | Truth Be Told | Apple TV+ | |
| 2020 | Little Fires Everywhere | Hulu | |
| 2022–present | Surface | Apple TV+ | |
| 2022 | From Scratch | Netflix | |
| 2023 | Daisy Jones & the Six | Amazon Prime Video | |
| 2023 | My Kind of Country | Apple TV+ | Reality competition series |
| 2023 | Tiny Beautiful Things | Hulu | |
| 2023 | The Last Thing He Told Me | Apple TV+ | |
| 2024 | Side Hustlers | The Roku Channel | |
| 2024 | Influenced | Amazon Prime Video | |
| 2024 | The Pasta Queen | Amazon Prime Video | |
| 2025 | Extreme Makeover: Home Edition | ABC | |
| 2025 | F1: The Academy | Netflix | |
| 2026 | Elle | Amazon Prime Video | |
| 2026 | Lucky | Apple TV | |

=== Web series ===
| Year | Title | Platform |
|---|---|---|
| 2018 | Handmade*mostly | Facebook Watch |
| 2018 | Turning Point | Facebook Watch |
| 2018 | Meet My Mom | Facebook Watch and IGTV |

=== Podcasts ===
| Year | Title | Notes |
|---|---|---|
| 2018–present | How It Is | |
| 2018 | My Best Break-Up | |
| 2019–present | And Especially You | |
