= Next Adventure =

Retail company in Portland, Oregon, US

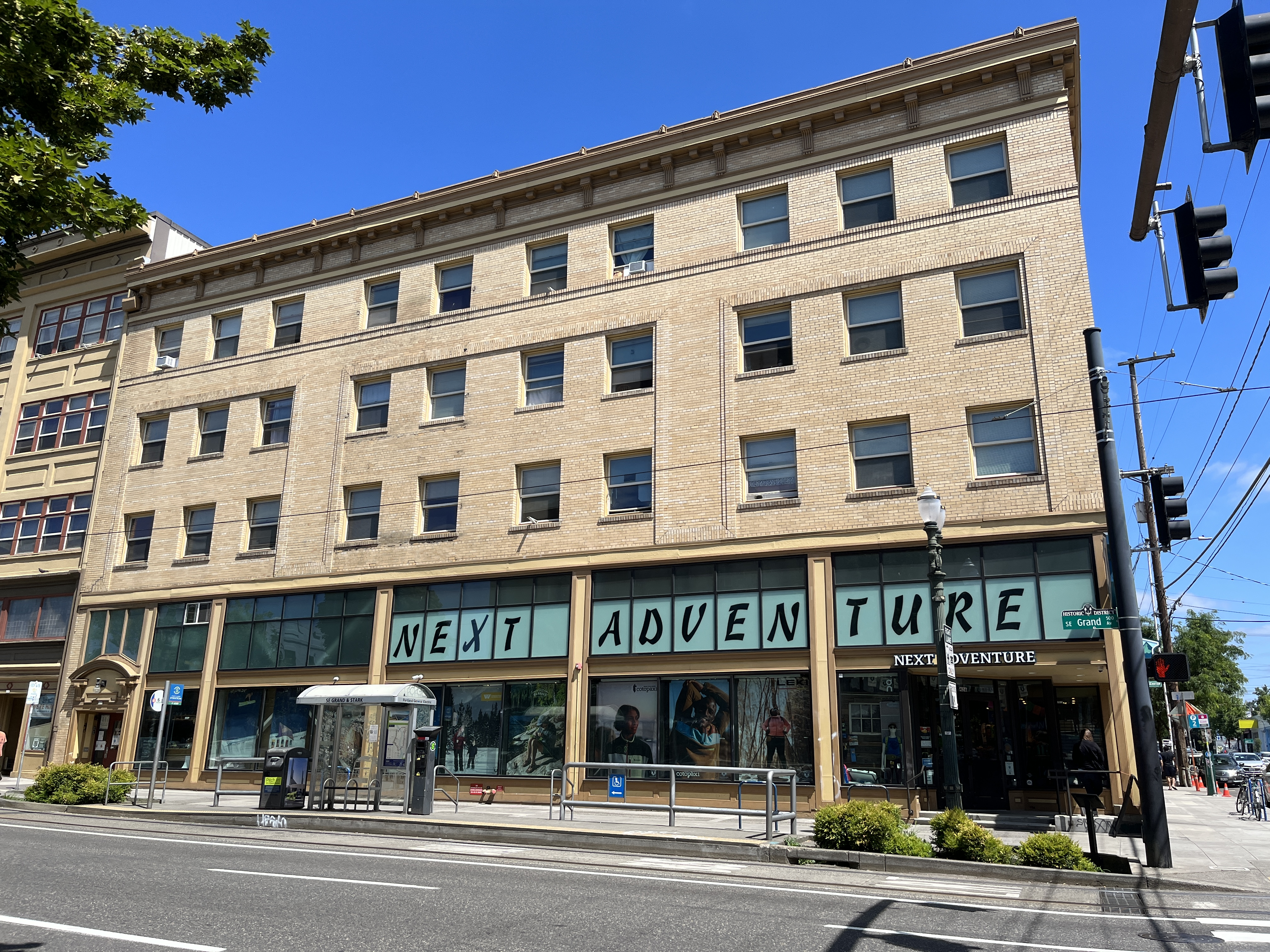
- Grand Avenue storefront in 2022
- Industry: Outdoor sports
- Founded: July 1997
- Headquarters: Portland, Oregon, United States
- Website: nextadventure.net

Next Adventure is an outdoor sports retail company based in Portland, Oregon, United States. It was founded in 1997, and later opened three other locations in the Portland metropolitan area. After planning to close the business in late 2025 and selling it to local investors in October, the original owners returned to the business in June 2026.

== History ==
Next Adventure was opened in July 1997 by Deek Heykamp and Bryan Knudsen on Southeast Grand Avenue, Portland, Oregon. The two were longtime friends and outdoor recreation enthusiasts, and worked in Seattle to gain experience before starting their business. They collected gear from garage sales and thrift stores, investing $30,000 in inventory. 80 percent of the store's inventory consisted of used items at its opening. By 1999, Jim Hill of The Oregonian reported that the business was "growing modestly"; the store had made $500,000 in revenue in 1998, with a six- to eight-percent profit margin.

The company later opened an additional store and two centers for water sports in the Portland metropolitan area, and an online shopping website. Between 2012 and 2015, its revenue increased from $12 million to $15 million. By 2017, about 65 percent of Next Adventure's inventory was new stock. The company had 150 employees by 2019, double their staffing from 2012. Across its 28 years in operation, it peaked at 200 employees and $24 million in annual sales.

Next Adventure organized regular expeditions for sports such as skiing, kayaking, and backpacking until 2021. The owners cited a lawsuit as the reason for discontinuing the tours.

In May 2025, Heykamp and Knudsen announced that they would be closing Next Adventure, planning to shut down all locations by late 2025 as they intended to retire. Heykamp said they had approached several potential buyers, but felt that none were the "right fit", with unpredictable economic conditions in the United States making the business difficult to sell. Veronica Nocera of The Oregonian noted that Next Adventure's announcement followed several other closures in Portland – including of other outdoor retailers like Andy and Bax and REI – after the COVID-19 pandemic.

Next Adventure announced in October that local investors had bought the store and intended to transition to a community ownership model. The two stores in Portland and Sandy remained open, with the location in Scappoose Bay rebranding as The Paddle Shack. However, the company announced that the deal had been canceled in June 2026, with Heykamp and Knudsen resuming ownership of the business.
