= Shine On with Reese =

Television series

- Genre: Talk show
- Presented by: Reese Witherspoon
- Country of origin: United States
- Original language: English
- No. of seasons: 1
- No. of episodes: 9

Production
- Executive producer: Reese Witherspoon
- Production company: Hello Sunshine

Original release
- Network: DirecTV
- Release: July 17, 2018–August 28, 2018

Shine On with Reese is an American talk show hosted by actress Reese Witherspoon. The show was announced on July 10, 2018 and had its premiere one week later on DirecTV.

Shine On also marks Witherspoon's first unscripted role in her career.

== Premise ==
The show is a one-on-one interview between Witherspoon and a female guest focusing on how she achieved her dreams.

== Background ==
In November 2016, Witherspoon and Otter Media formed Hello Sunshine, a joint venture focused on telling female-driven stories on film, TV and digital platforms. The company has multiple series and films in development including Big Little Lies.

Before the formal announcement, the series was teased by Witherspoon in an interview on Good Morning America while promoting A Wrinkle in Time. The show was announced on July 10, 2018 on Witherspoon's Instagram. The first season will have nine episodes and will air on DirecTV's Hello Sunshine channel. All guests on the show were also announced in a press release.

== Episodes ==
| No. | Title | Original release date | U.S. viewers (millions) |
|---|---|---|---|
| 1 | "Dolly Parton" | July 17, 2018 | N/A |
Reese heads to Nashville to spend the day with country music legend, Dolly Parton. While singing duets and raiding Dolly's closet, Reese learns about Dolly's trailblazing journey to becoming one of the most celebrated singer-songwriters of all time.
| 2 | "Ava DuVernay" | July 17, 2018 | N/A |
Reese heads to the Disney Lot to spend the day with the acclaimed writer, director, producer and independent film distributor, Ava DuVernay. Reese learns about Ava's incredible journey and how this visionary filmmaker is changing Hollywood.
| 3 | "P!nk" | July 17, 2018 | N/A |
Reese heads to Venice Beach to spend the day with the award-winning singer, songwriter and performer P!nk at her home. They discuss everything from blazing their own path to motherhood. While visiting P!nk at rehearsal, Reese flies high.
| 4 | "Cleo Wade, Elaine Welteroth" | July 24, 2018 | N/A |
Reese heads to NYC to spend the day with journalist/editor/writer Elaine Welteroth and poet/artist/author Cleo Wade. The three talk about their unique career paths, what inspires them, and the importance of uplifting the next generation of women.
| 5 | "Sara Blakely, Candace Nelson" | July 31, 2018 | N/A |
Reese goes to Atlanta to spend the day with Sara Blakely to learn how she built her billion dollar empire, SPANX. Reese then returns to LA to frost cupcakes and throw pizza dough with Candace Nelson, owner of Pizzana and the famed bakery Sprinkles.
| 6 | "Glennon Doyle, Abby Wambach" | August 14, 2018 | N/A |
Reese spends the day with best-selling author, speaker, and activist, Glennon Doyle and her wife, retired soccer player, two-time Olympic gold medalist and World Cup champion, Abby Wambach. They discuss overcoming challenges and living truthfully.
| 7 | "America Ferrera" | August 14, 2018 | N/A |
Reese heads to the University of Southern California to spend the day with acclaimed actress, producer, and director America Ferrera. Reese learns what inspired America to be an actress and activist. The two trade college stories and talk Time's Up.
| 8 | "Kacey Musgraves" | August 21, 2018 | N/A |
Reese heads to Nashville to spend the day with award-winning country music singer-songwriter Kacey Musgraves. The two discuss everything from how Kacey got her start and is pushing boundaries to what it’s like to be a woman in country music today.
| 9 | "Simone Askew" | August 28, 2018 | N/A |
Reese heads to the US Military Academy at West Point to meet First Captain Simone Askew. Reese learns about Simone's leadership of 4,400 cadets and what it means to be the first African-American woman to hold that position.

== External list ==
- Shine On with Reese at IMDb
