= Wild (2014 film) =

2014 film by Jean-Marc Vallée

- Theatrical release poster
- Directed by: Jean-Marc Vallée
- Screenplay by: Nick Hornby
- Based on: Wild: From Lost to Found on the Pacific Crest Trail by Cheryl Strayed
- Produced by: Reese Witherspoon; Bruna Papandrea; Bill Pohlad
- Starring: Reese Witherspoon; Laura Dern
- Cinematography: Yves Bélanger
- Edited by: John Mac McMurphy; Martin Pensa
- Production companies: Pacific Standard; River Road Entertainment
- Distributed by: Fox Searchlight Pictures
- Release dates: August 29, 2014 (Telluride); December 5, 2014 (United States)
- Running time: 115 minutes
- Country: United States
- Language: English
- Budget: $15 million
- Box office: $52.5 million

Wild is a 2014 American biographical adventure drama film directed by Jean-Marc Vallée and written by Nick Hornby, based on the 2012 memoir Wild: From Lost to Found on the Pacific Crest Trail by Cheryl Strayed. Starring Reese Witherspoon, Laura Dern, Thomas Sadoski, Michiel Huisman, Gaby Hoffmann, Kevin Rankin, and W. Earl Brown, the film follows Strayed as she embarks on a solo hiking trip on the Pacific Crest Trail in 1995 after numerous personal problems had left her life in shambles.

The film premiered at the Telluride Film Festival on August 29, 2014, and was released theatrically in the United States on December 5, 2014. It received positive reviews from critics and was a box office success, grossing $52.5 million against its $15 million budget. Witherspoon and Dern received nominations at the 87th Academy Awards for Best Actress and Best Supporting Actress, respectively.

== Plot ==
In June 1995, despite a lack of hiking experience, Cheryl Strayed leaves Minneapolis to hike, by herself, 1,100 miles (1,800 km) of the 2,650-mile (4,260 km) Pacific Crest Trail. During the journey, she reflects on her childhood and memories of her mother, Bobbi, whose death from cancer sent Cheryl into a deep depression that she tried to numb with heroin and anonymous sex. After her behavior destroyed her marriage and then led to an abortion, Cheryl resolves to hike the trail to try to rediscover the woman her mother raised her to be.

Cheryl begins her trek in the Mojave Desert in Southern California with her overstuffed backpack which she nicknames Monster. On the first night, she discovers she brought the wrong type of fuel for her stove and is therefore unable to eat hot food. After a few days of eating only cold food, she meets a farmer named Frank, who takes her back to his farmhouse for a hot shower and a cooked meal, and takes her to get the correct fuel the following morning.

Further along the trail, Cheryl meets a hiker named Greg, whom she agrees to meet up with again at Kennedy Meadows. While there, a camper named Ed tells her she's wearing the wrong sized boots and informs her that she can call the shoe company and they'll send the proper size at her next rest stop. He also helps her lighten the weight of her backpack.

Under Greg's advice, Cheryl decides to take a bus to Reno and rejoin the PCT from there in order to avoid all the snow, deciding to extend the trip to the Bridge of the Gods in Oregon to make up for all the miles she didn't hike by taking the bus, but she still encounters quite a bit of snow. She is able to make it through and arrives at the town where her new boots were sent.

Cheryl crosses into Oregon and goes to Ashland. She meets Jonathan, who invites her to a tribute concert to the recently deceased Jerry Garcia, and they spend the night together.

Sometime later, after visiting Crater Lake, Cheryl gets to Mount Hood National Forest, where she encounters a friendly group of young male hikers who recognize her from the brief quotes and poems that she frequently writes alongside her signature in the hiker's record books along the PCT.

One rainy day, Cheryl finds a llama that escaped from a young boy hiking with his grandmother. She returns it to the little boy, who asks about her parents. When she mentions her mother is dead, the boy sings her "Red River Valley", which his mother used to sing to him. The boy and his grandmother carry on down the trail, and Cheryl breaks down and weeps.

A few weeks later, Cheryl finally makes it to the Bridge of the Gods, ending her journey. It is revealed that four years later she remarried and had a son, Carver and a daughter, Bobbi (named after her mother) almost ten years after getting married.

== Cast ==
- Reese Witherspoon as Cheryl Strayed
- Bobbi Strayed Lindstrom (daughter of the real-life Cheryl Strayed) as Cheryl (6 Yrs Old)
- Laura Dern as Barbara "Bobbi" Grey, Cheryl's mother
- Thomas Sadoski as Paul, Cheryl's ex-husband (based on Marco Littig, the real-life Cheryl's ex-husband)
- Michiel Huisman as Jonathan, a man Cheryl has sex with after meeting him in Ashland, Oregon
- Gaby Hoffmann as Aimee, Cheryl's best friend in Minnesota
- Kevin Rankin as Greg, a hiker Cheryl meets on the trail who ends up quitting (based on Roger Carpenter)
- W. Earl Brown as Frank, a farmer who lets Cheryl eat, shower, and sleep at the home he shares with his wife, Annette
- Mo McRae as Jimmy Carter, a reporter who interviews Cheryl for the "Hobo Times" after mistaking her for a hobo drifter
- Keene McRae as Leif, Cheryl's younger brother
- Brian Van Holt as the Ranger in Mount Hood National Forest who reopens the station for Cheryl and brings her breakfast
- Cliff DeYoung as Ed, a man at Kennedy Meadows trail stop who helps Cheryl
- Ray Buckley (credited as Ray Mist) as Joe, Cheryl's drug-addicted boyfriend who got her pregnant, resulting in an abortion
- Randy Schulman as the Therapist that Cheryl sees after Bobbi's death
- Cathryn de Prume as Stacey Johnson, a female hiker Cheryl meets at a stop on the trail
- Charles Baker as T.J., the more threatening of a pair of hunters Cheryl meets on the trail
- J.D. Evermore as Clint, the less threatening of a pair of hunters Cheryl meets on the trail
- Beth Hall as the Desk Clerk at the motel where Cheryl stays before beginning her hike
- Jan Hoag as Annette (Frank's Wife)
- Art Alexakis as the Tattooist
- Anne Gee Byrd as Vera, a woman Cheryl meets on the trail; Kyle's grandmother
- Evan O'Toole as Kyle, a young boy Cheryl meets on the trail; Vera's grandson
- Jason Newell as Cheryl's Dad (Ronald Nylund)

Cheryl Strayed makes a cameo appearance at the beginning of the film as the woman who drops off the character of Cheryl at the motel where she stays before beginning her hike.

== Production ==
On March 8, 2012, Reese Witherspoon announced she planned to make a film based on Cheryl Strayed's memoir Wild: From Lost to Found on the Pacific Crest Trail through her new production company, Pacific Standard, as well as star as Strayed in the production. In July 2013, Fox Searchlight Pictures acquired the rights to the project, with Nick Hornby writing and Witherspoon, Bruna Papandrea, and Bill Pohlad producing. In August 2013, Canadian Jean-Marc Vallée signed on to direct.

Many of the props and costumes were acquired from Oregon businesses; Danner Boots recreated the boot featured on the cover of Strayed's book, and vintage clothing worn by the extras was purchased from the outdoor sports store Next Adventure.

Principal photography for the film began on October 11, 2013, with shooting occurring on location in Oregon and California. Strayed was available to the production during their time in Oregon. On the rigors of shooting, Witherspoon stated:

By far, this is the hardest movie I've ever made in my life. I didn't hike a thousand miles, of course, but it was a different kind of physical rigor. I'd run up a hill with a 45-pound backpack on, and they'd say, 'Wait, that backpack doesn't look heavy enough. Put this 65-pound backpack on and run up the hill nine or ten times.' We literally didn't stop shooting in those remote locations—we wouldn't break for lunch, we'd just eat snacks. No bathroom breaks. It was crazy, but it was so wonderful. It was complete immersion, and I've never felt closer to a crew. We literally pulled each other up the mountains and carried each others' equipment.

=== Music ===
The film's soundtrack, supervised by Susan Jacobs, was released by Sony's Legacy Recordings on November 10, 2014. It contains 15 tracks from various eras of music. Vallée said: "The main direction with music was to use it only during flashbacks. [...] What Cheryl is listening to in her life, is the music that we hear during the film."

A song featured prominently throughout the film is the Simon & Garfunkel recording of "El Cóndor Pasa (If I Could)", which was used primarily to evoke Cheryl's memory of her mother. Jacobs explained: "This isn't about reality. This is about keeping the essence of the mother there."

== Release ==
Wild premiered on August 29, 2014, at the Telluride Film Festival, and was featured at the Toronto International Film Festival on September 8 and the San Diego Film Festival on September 24. It was released theatrically in North America on December 3.

The Bridge of the Gods, where Strayed's journey ends, enjoyed increased popularity and traffic after the film came out, leading to an increase in its toll.

== Reception ==
On review aggregator website Rotten Tomatoes, Wild holds an approval rating of 88% based on 280 reviews, with an average rating of 7.50/10; the site's critical consensus reads: "Powerfully moving and emotionally resonant, Wild finds director Jean-Marc Vallée and star Reese Witherspoon working at the peak of their respective powers." Metacritic, which uses a weighted average, assigned the film a score of 74 out of 100 based on 47 reviews, indicating "generally favorable reviews". Audiences polled by CinemaScore gave the film an average grade of "A−" on an A+ to F scale.

A.O. Scott of The New York Times wrote that Witherspoon, who appears in nearly every frame of the film, portrayed Strayed "with grit, wit and unblinking honesty." He added that the "most audacious" element of the film was its respect for the "free-associative, memory-driven narrative" in Strayed's written memoir, asserting that the film exhibits a "thrilling disregard" for conventions of commercial cinematic storytelling to demonstrate that images and emotions can carry meaning more effectively than "neatly packaged scenes or carefully scripted character arcs." Stephen Farber of The Hollywood Reporter praised Witherspoon and Dern's performances, as well as Vallée, who he said "has crafted a vivid wilderness adventure film that is also a powerful story of family anguish and survival", and Hornby, for adapting "the book with finesse." Justin Chang of Variety said: "It's no surprise that the versatile Vallée, who recently directed two Oscar-winning performances in Dallas Buyers Club, has elicited from Witherspoon an intensely committed turn that, in its blend of grit, vulnerability, physical bravery, and emotional immediacy, represents easily her most affecting and substantial work in the nine years since Walk the Line [...] Nor is it a surprise that Vallée, whose bracingly sharp editing on Dallas Buyers Club was one of that film's more unsung virtues, has applied similarly bold cutting-room strategies here." Pete Hammond of Deadline Hollywood echoed these statements, feeling Witherspoon "nails it" and that she "delivers her best screen work since her Oscar-winning turn in Walk the Line, and this three-dimensional portrayal of a woman searching for herself [...] is certain to put her back in the thick of the Best Actress race". My Film Habit critic Allison M. Lyzenga said: "It was trying to be a lot of things, and don't think it really accomplished all of them, but it was still interesting enough. So, it's worth a rental."

Strayed stated that the film was snubbed from the Best Picture category at the Academy Awards due to "Hollywood sexism." Seven of the eight nominees for the 2014 Best Picture award revolved almost entirely around male characters.

=== Accolades ===
Award	Date of ceremony	Category	Recipients and nominees	Result
Academy Awards	February 22, 2015	Best Actress	Reese Witherspoon	Nominated
Academy Awards	February 22, 2015	Best Supporting Actress	Laura Dern	Nominated
AACTA International Awards	January 31, 2015	Best Actress	Reese Witherspoon	Nominated
British Academy Film Awards	February 8, 2015	Best Actress in a Leading Role	Reese Witherspoon	Nominated
Critics' Choice Movie Awards	January 15, 2015	Best Actress	Reese Witherspoon	Nominated
Critics' Choice Movie Awards	January 15, 2015	Best Adapted Screenplay	Nick Hornby	Nominated
Costume Designers Guild	February 17, 2015	Excellence in Contemporary Film	Melissa Bruning	Nominated
Golden Globe Awards	January 11, 2015	Best Actress in a Motion Picture – Drama	Reese Witherspoon	Nominated
Location Managers Guild Awards	March 7, 2015	Outstanding Locations in a Contemporary Film	Nancy Haecker	Won
MTV Movie Awards	April 12, 2015	Best Female Performance	Reese Witherspoon	Nominated
People's Choice Awards	January 7, 2015	Favorite Dramatic Movie Actress	Reese Witherspoon	Nominated
San Francisco Film Critics Circle Award	December 14, 2014	Best Actress	Reese Witherspoon	Nominated
San Francisco Film Critics Circle Award	December 14, 2014	Best Adapted Screenplay	Nick Hornby	Nominated
Satellite Awards	February 15, 2015	Best Actress	Reese Witherspoon	Nominated
Satellite Awards	February 15, 2015	Best Supporting Actress	Laura Dern	Nominated
Satellite Awards	February 15, 2015	Best Adapted Screenplay	Nick Hornby	Nominated
Screen Actors Guild Award	January 25, 2015	Outstanding Performance by a Female Actor in a Leading Role	Reese Witherspoon	Nominated
Teen Choice Awards	August 16, 2015	Choice Movie Actress: Drama	Reese Witherspoon	Nominated
USC Scripter Award	January 31, 2015	Best Adapted Screenplay	Nick Hornby, Cheryl Strayed	Nominated
Washington D.C. Area Film Critics Association Awards	December 8, 2014	Best Actress	Reese Witherspoon	Nominated
Washington D.C. Area Film Critics Association Awards	December 8, 2014	Best Supporting Actress	Laura Dern	Nominated
Washington D.C. Area Film Critics Association Awards	December 8, 2014	Best Adapted Screenplay	Nick Hornby	Nominated
Writers Guild of America Awards	February 14, 2015	Best Adapted Screenplay	Nick Hornby	Nominated

== See also ==
- Into the Wild, a 2007 film about a young man's solo journey into the Alaskan wilderness
