= Cameron Waldbauer =

Canadian special effects supervisor

- Born: Pitt Meadows, British Columbia, Canada
- Occupation: Visual effects artist
- Years active: 1998–present

Cameron Waldbauer is a Canadian (mechanical and physical) special effects supervisor.

Waldbaurer was nominated for the Best Visual Effects at the 87th Academy Awards for his work on the film X-Men: Days of Future Past. His nomination was shared with Tim Crosbie, Lou Pecora, and Richard Stammers.

He received his second nomination at the 88th Academy Awards for his work on the film The Revenant. His nomination was shared with Richard McBride, Matt Shumway and Jason Smith.

== Selected filmography ==
- Firestorm (1998)
- Shanghai Noon (2000)
- Halloween: Resurrection (2002)
- I Spy (2002)
- X2: X-Men United (2003)
- I, Robot (2004)
- Fantastic Four (2005)
- X-Men: The Last Stand (2006)
- Fantastic 4: Rise of the Silver Surfer (2007)
- Quantum of Solace (2008)
- 2012 (2009)
- X-Men Origins: Wolverine (2009)
- The A-Team (2010)
- Mission: Impossible – Ghost Protocol (2011)
- Elysium (2013)
- Percy Jackson: Sea of Monsters (2013)
- White House Down (2013)
- X-Men: Days of Future Past (2014)
- The Revenant (2015)
- Star Trek Beyond (2016)
- Warcraft (2016)
- X-Men: Apocalypse (2016)
- Shazam! (2019)
