= 87th Academy Awards =

- Official poster
- Date: February 22, 2015
- Site: Dolby Theatre; Hollywood, Los Angeles, California, U.S.
- Hosted by: Neil Patrick Harris
- Preshow hosts: Jess Cagle; Robin Roberts; Lara Spencer; Michael Strahan; Joe Zee
- Produced by: Neil Meron; Craig Zadan
- Directed by: Hamish Hamilton

Highlights
- Best Picture: Birdman or (The Unexpected Virtue of Ignorance)
- Most awards: Birdman or (The Unexpected Virtue of Ignorance) and The Grand Budapest Hotel (4)
- Most nominations: Birdman or (The Unexpected Virtue of Ignorance) and The Grand Budapest Hotel (9)

TV in the United States
- Network: ABC
- Duration: 3 hours, 43 minutes
- Ratings: 37.26 million; 20.6% (Nielsen ratings)

The 87th Academy Awards ceremony, presented by the Academy of Motion Picture Arts and Sciences (AMPAS), honored the best films of 2014 and took place on February 22, 2015, at the Dolby Theatre in Hollywood, Los Angeles, beginning at 5:30 p.m. PST / 8:30 p.m. EST. During the ceremony, AMPAS presented Academy Awards (commonly referred to as Oscars) in 24 categories. The ceremony was televised in the United States by ABC, produced by Neil Meron and Craig Zadan and directed by Hamish Hamilton. Actor Neil Patrick Harris hosted the ceremony for the first time.

In related events, the Academy held its 6th Annual Governors Awards ceremony at the Grand Ballroom of the Hollywood and Highland Center on November 8, 2014. On February 7, 2015, in a ceremony at the Beverly Wilshire Hotel in Beverly Hills, California, the Academy Awards for Technical Achievement were presented by hosts Margot Robbie and Miles Teller.

Birdman or (The Unexpected Virtue of Ignorance) won four awards, including Best Picture. Other winners included The Grand Budapest Hotel with four awards, Whiplash with three, and American Sniper, Big Hero 6, Boyhood, Citizenfour, Crisis Hotline: Veterans Press 1, Feast, Ida, The Imitation Game, Interstellar, The Phone Call, Selma, Still Alice, and The Theory of Everything with one. The telecast garnered more than 37 million viewers in the United States.

== Winners and nominees ==
The nominees for the 87th Academy Awards were announced on January 15, 2015, at 5:30 a.m. PST (13:30 UTC), at the Samuel Goldwyn Theater in Beverly Hills, California, by directors J. J. Abrams and Alfonso Cuarón, Academy president Cheryl Boone Isaacs and actor Chris Pine. For the first time, nominations for all 24 competitive categories were announced. Birdman or (The Unexpected Virtue of Ignorance) and The Grand Budapest Hotel tied for the most nominations with nine each.

The winners were announced during the awards ceremony on February 22, 2015. For the first time since the expansion of the Best Picture nominee roster at the 82nd ceremony in 2010, every Best Picture nominee won at least one award. Birdman was the first film to win Best Picture without an editing nomination since Ordinary People (1980). Alejandro G. Iñárritu became the second consecutive Mexican to win for Best Director after Cuarón who won for helming Gravity. At age 84, Robert Duvall was the oldest male acting nominee in Oscar history. Having won for his work on Gravity the year before, Emmanuel Lubezki became the fourth person to win two consecutive Best Cinematography awards. John Toll was the last one who accomplished this feat for his work on 1994's Legends of the Fall and 1995's Braveheart.

=== Awards ===
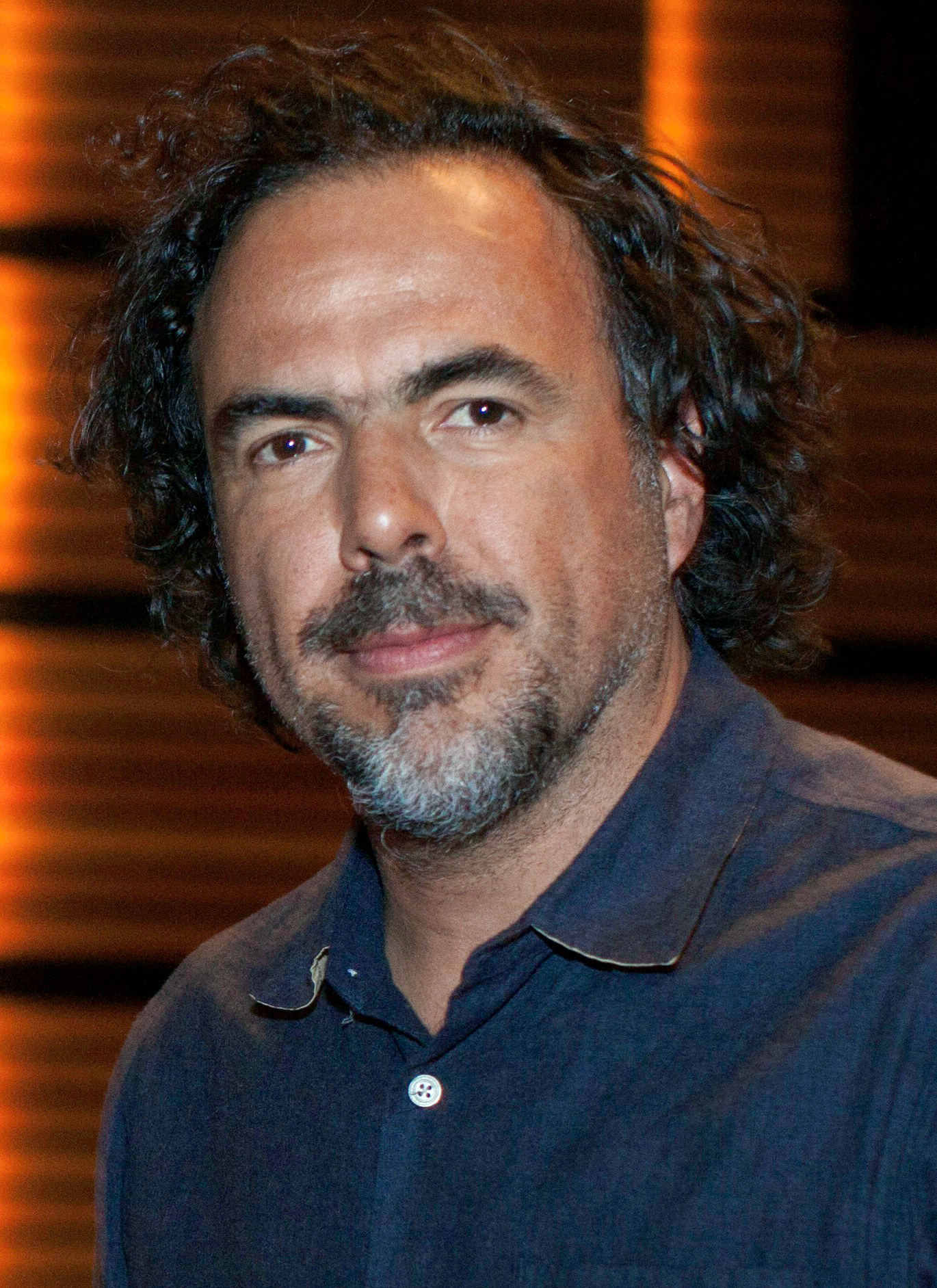
Alejandro González Iñárritu, Best Picture and Best Original Screenplay co-winner, and Best Director winner

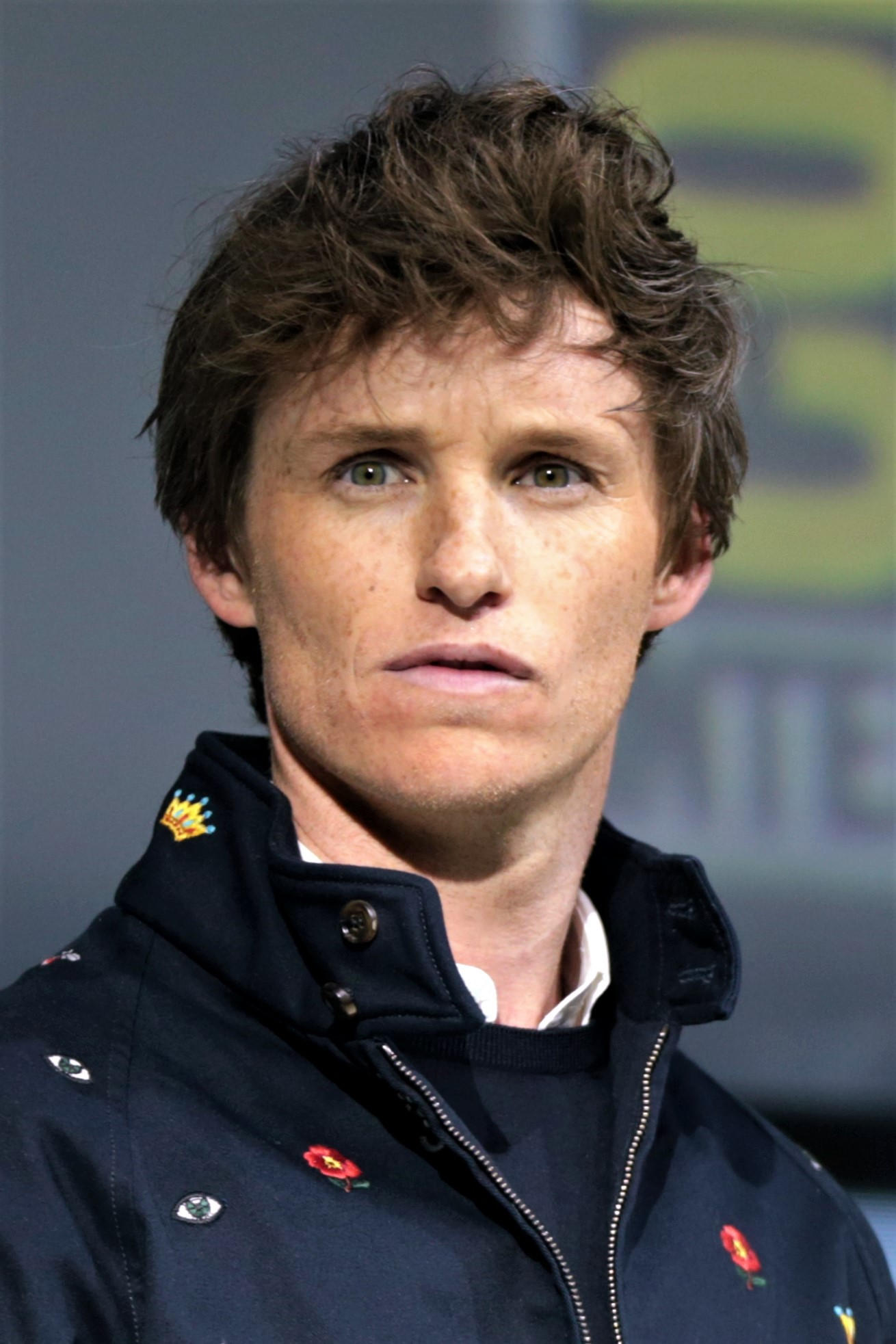
Eddie Redmayne, Best Actor winner

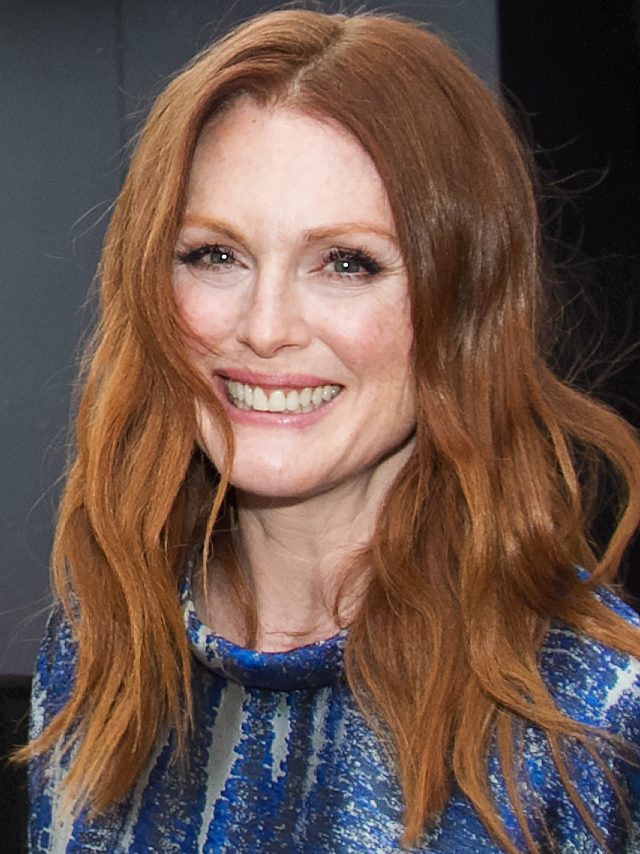
Julianne Moore, Best Actress winner

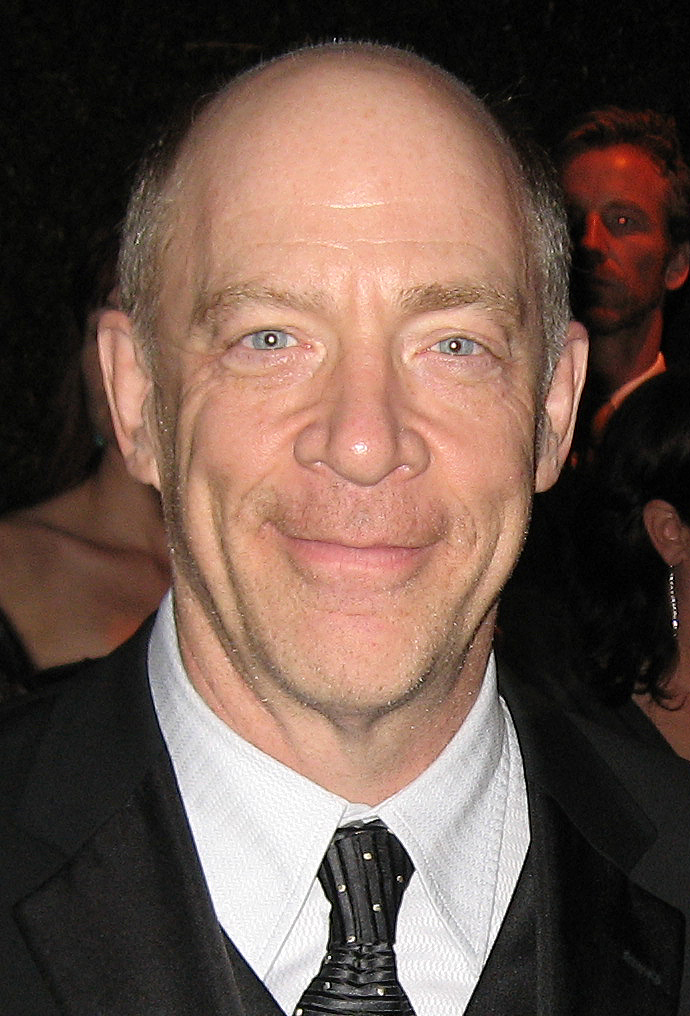
J. K. Simmons, Best Supporting Actor winner

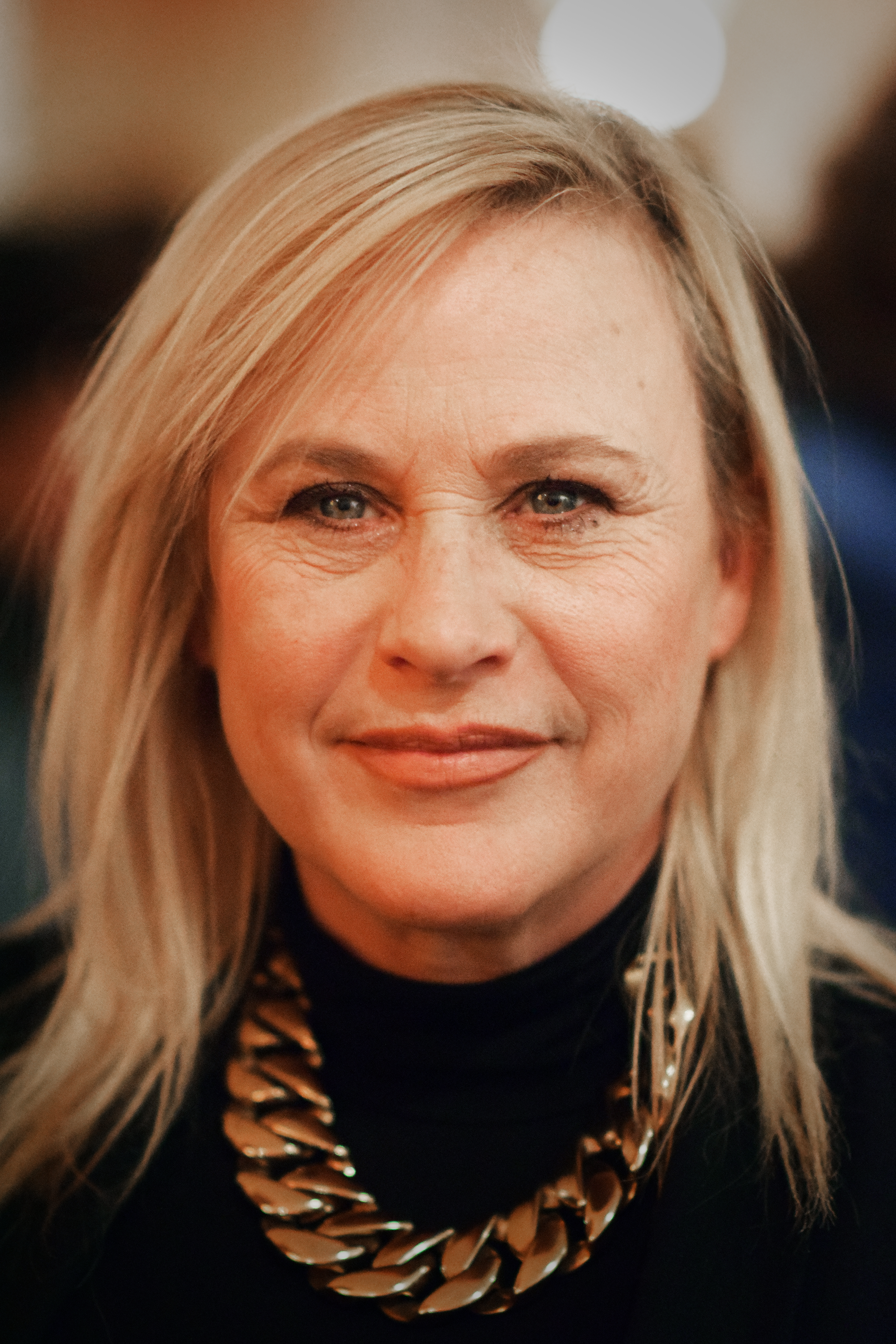
Patricia Arquette, Best Supporting Actress winner

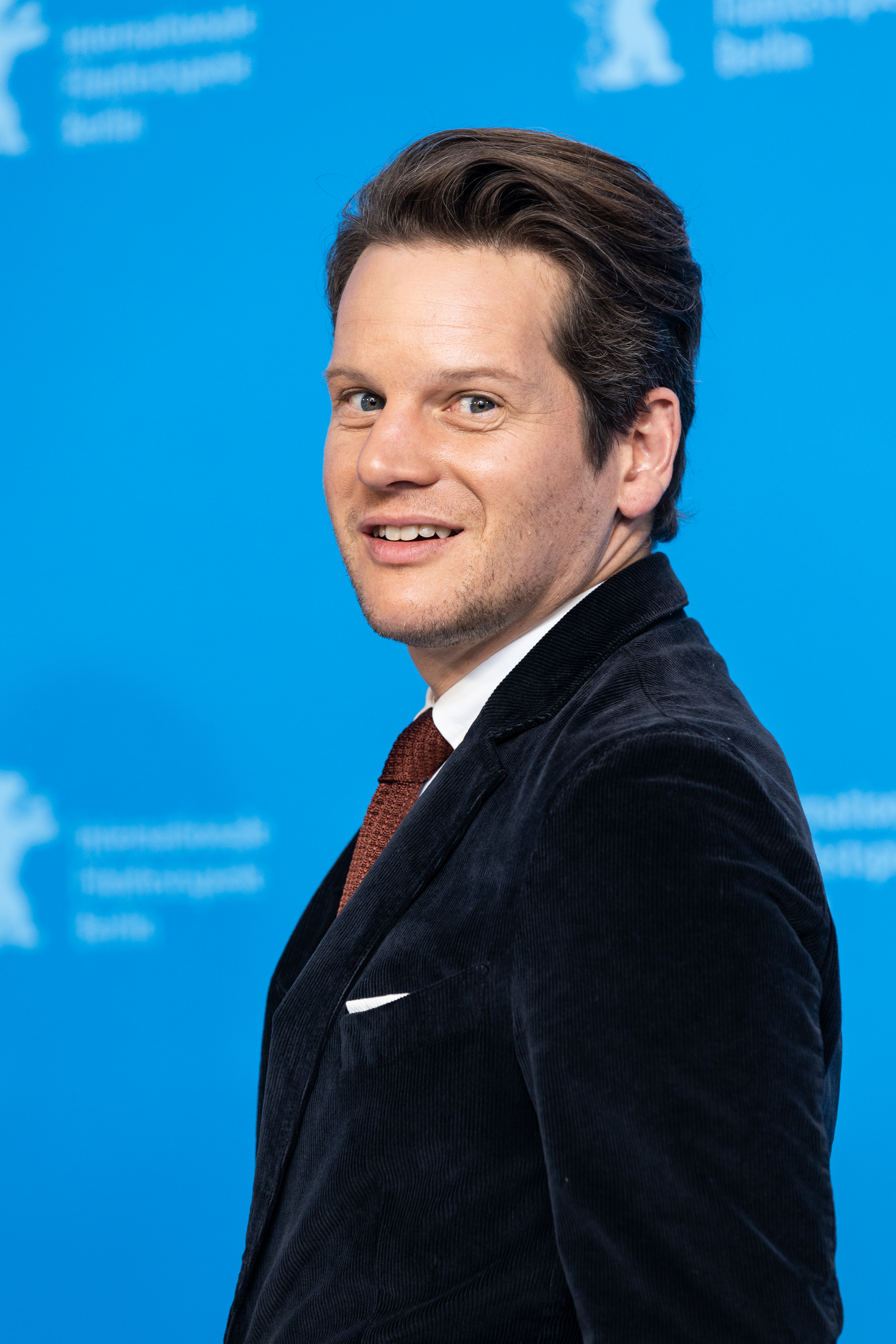
Graham Moore, Best Adapted Screenplay winner

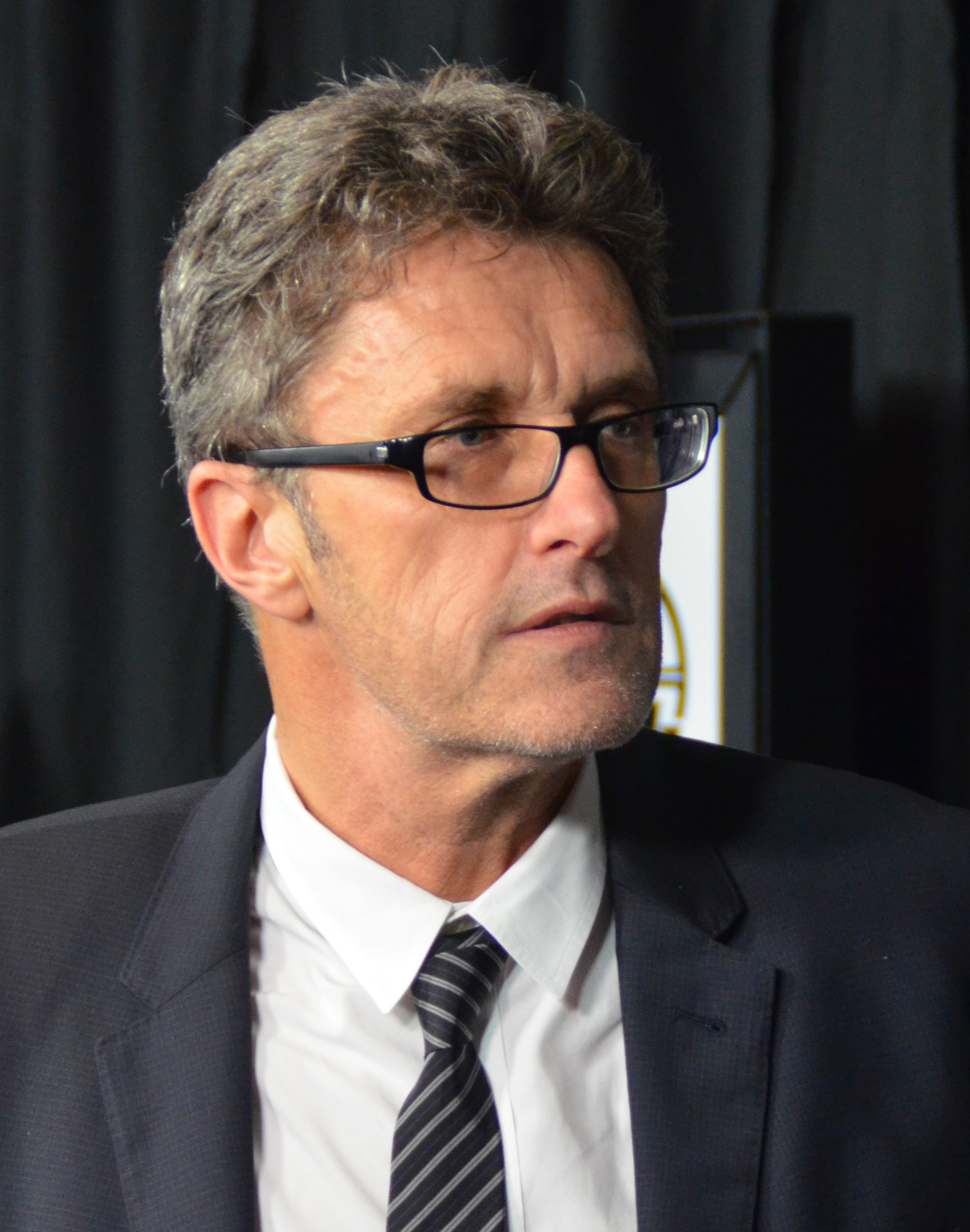
Paweł Pawlikowski, Best Foreign Language Film winner

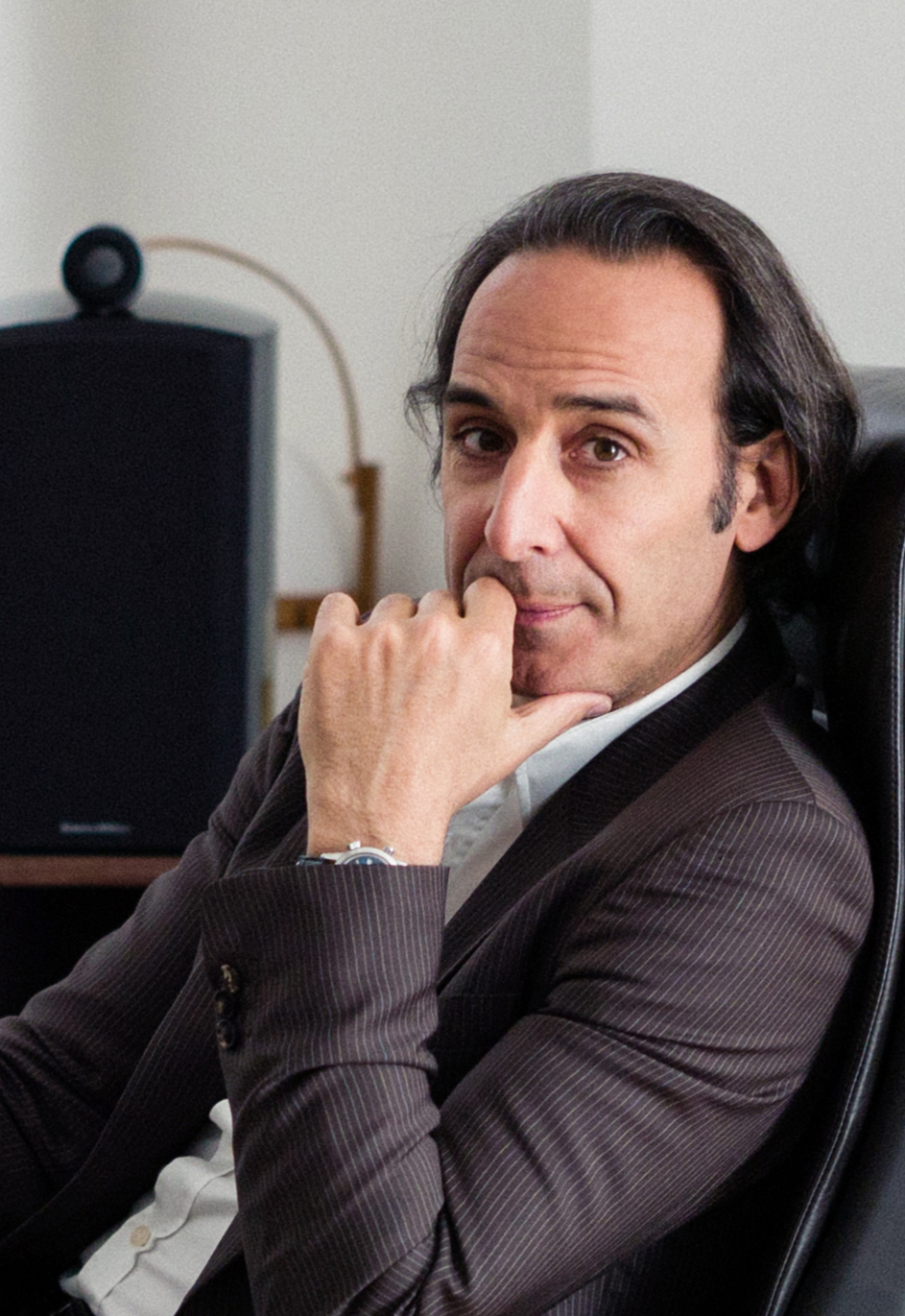
Alexandre Desplat, Best Original Score winner

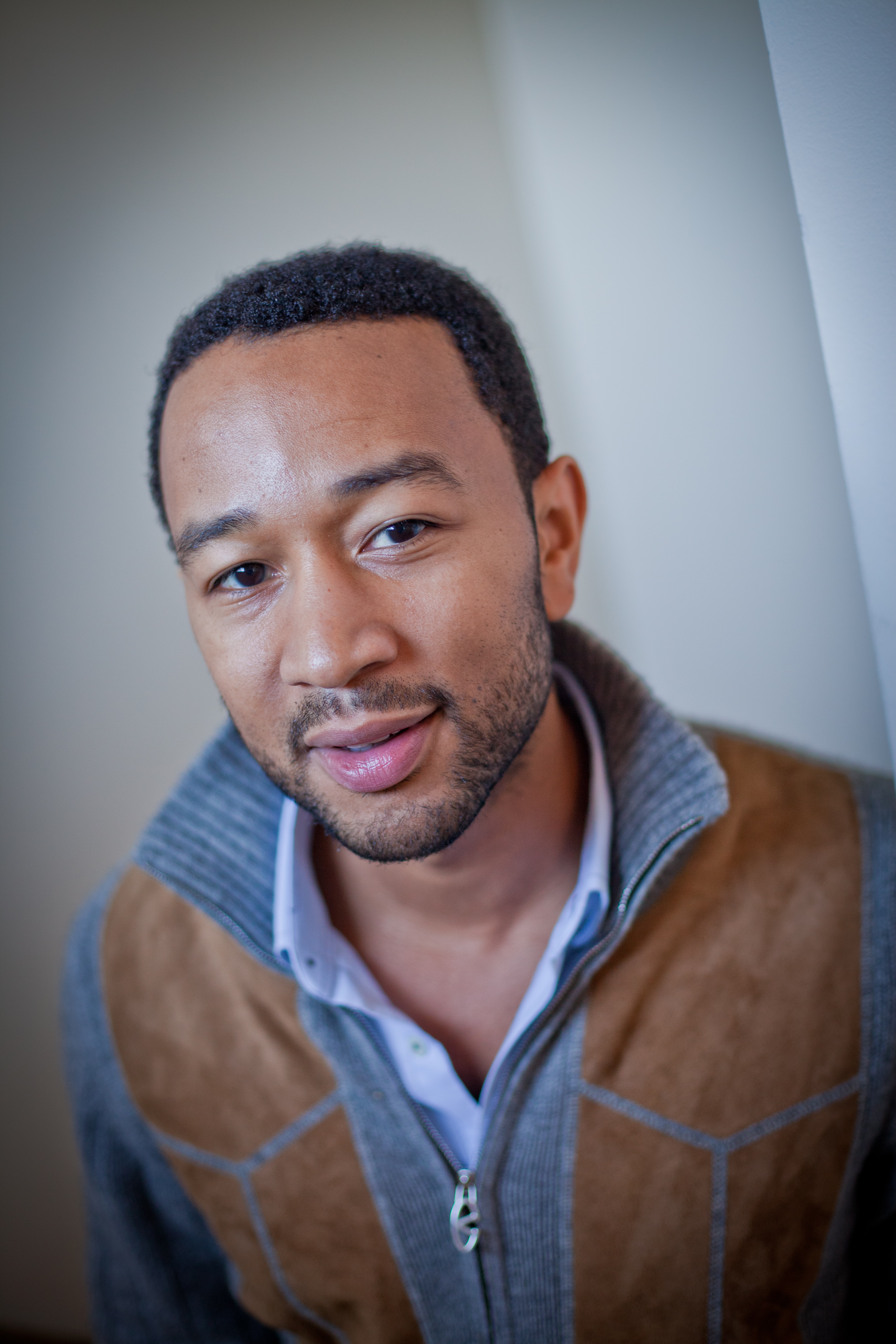
John Legend, Best Original Song co-winner

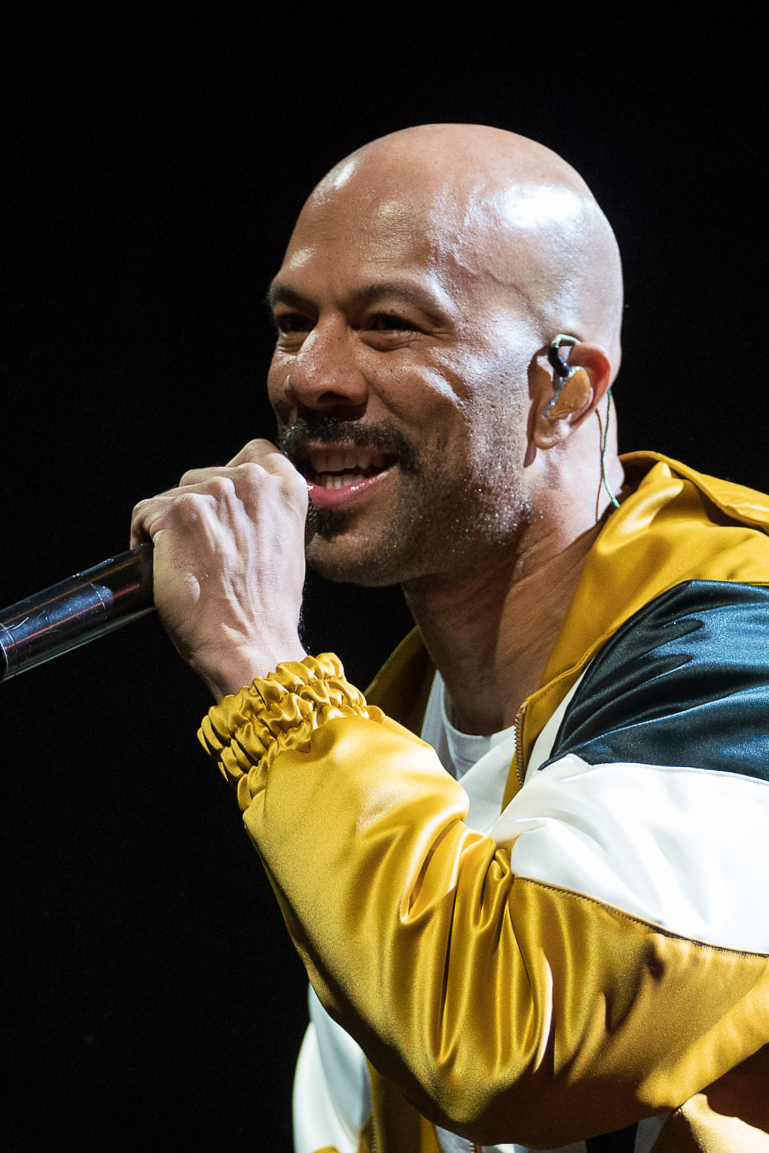
Common, Best Original Song co-winner

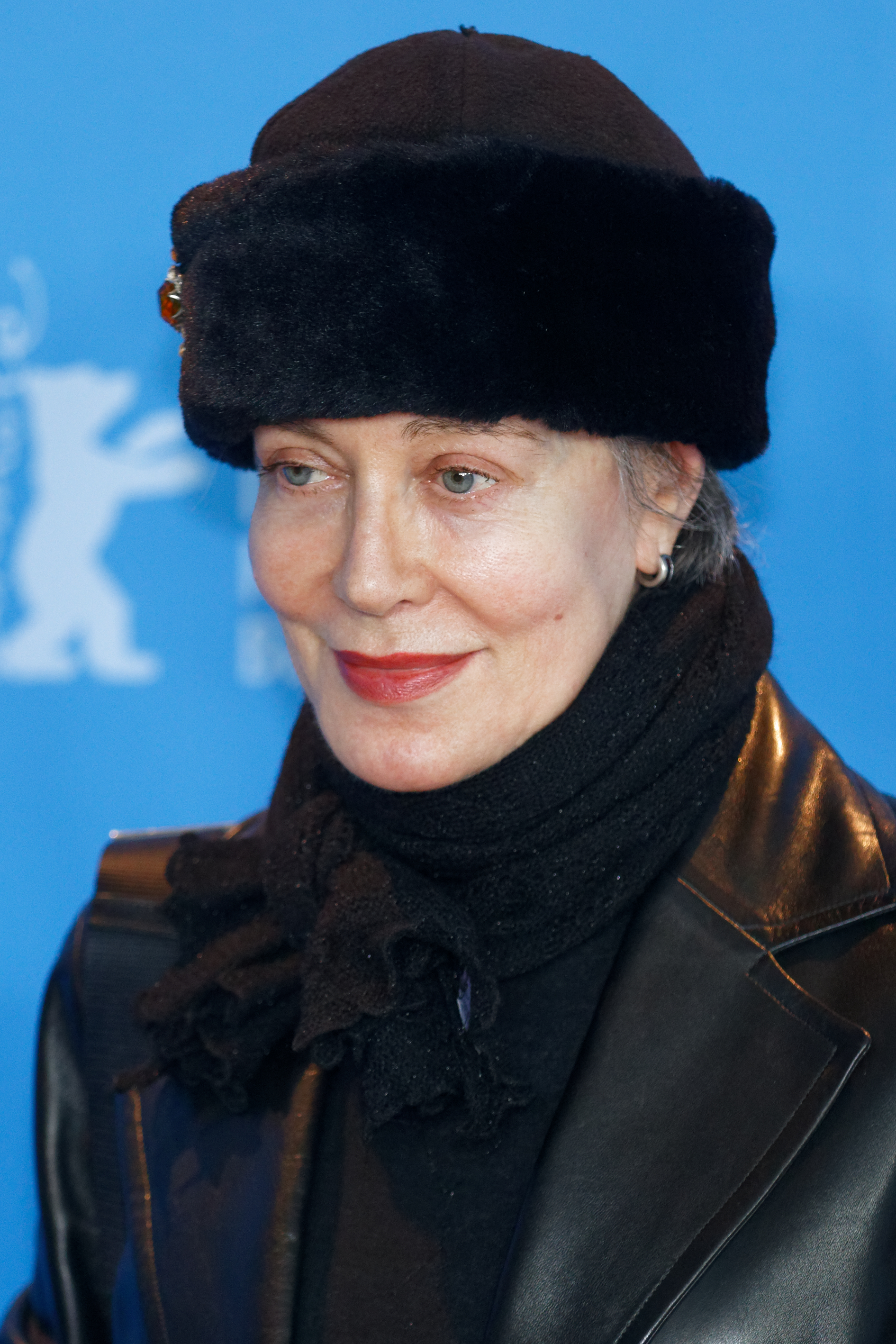
Milena Canonero, Best Costume Design winner

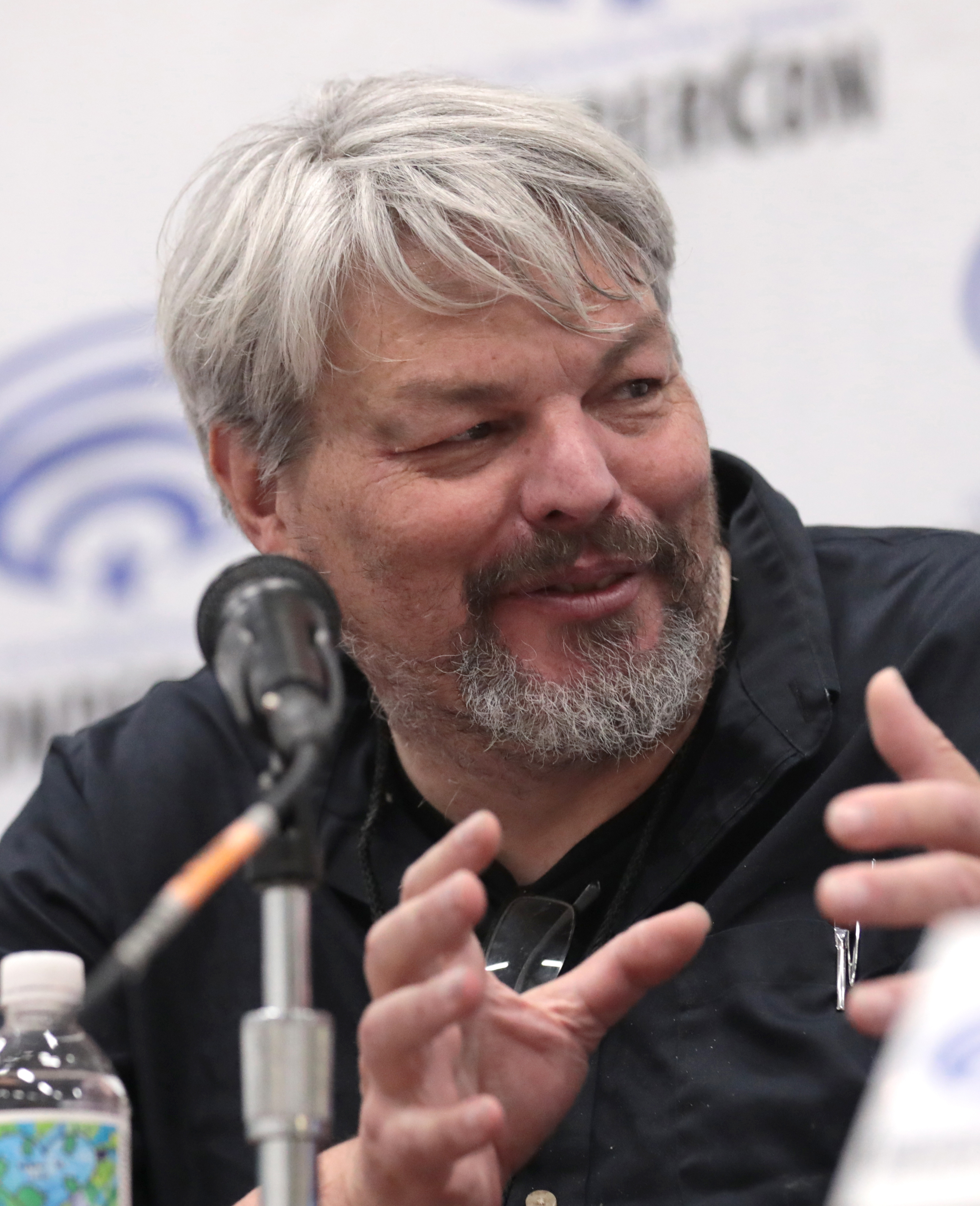
Ian Hunter, Best Visual Effects co-winner

Winners are listed first, highlighted in boldface, and indicated with a double dagger (‡).

**Best Picture**: **Birdman or (The Unexpected Virtue of Ignorance) – Alejandro G. Iñárritu, John Lesher, and James W. Skotchdopole, producers**‡; American Sniper – Clint Eastwood, Robert Lorenz, Andrew Lazar, Bradley Cooper, and Peter Morgan, producers; Boyhood – Richard Linklater and Cathleen Sutherland, producers; The Grand Budapest Hotel – Wes Anderson, Scott Rudin, Steven Rales and Jeremy Dawson, producers; The Imitation Game – Nora Grossman, Ido Ostrowsky, and Teddy Schwarzman, producers; Selma – Christian Colson, Oprah Winfrey, Dede Gardner, and Jeremy Kleiner, producers; The Theory of Everything – Tim Bevan, Eric Fellner, Lisa Bruce, and Anthony McCarten, producers; Whiplash – Jason Blum, Helen Estabrook, and David Lancaster, producers	**Best Directing**: **Alejandro G. Iñárritu – Birdman or (The Unexpected Virtue of Ignorance)**‡; Richard Linklater – Boyhood; Bennett Miller – Foxcatcher; Wes Anderson – The Grand Budapest Hotel; Morten Tyldum – The Imitation Game
**Best Actor in a Leading Role**: **Eddie Redmayne – The Theory of Everything as Stephen Hawking**‡; Steve Carell – Foxcatcher as John du Pont; Bradley Cooper – American Sniper as Chris Kyle; Benedict Cumberbatch – The Imitation Game as Alan Turing; Michael Keaton – Birdman or (The Unexpected Virtue of Ignorance) as Riggan Thomson	**Best Actress in a Leading Role**: **Julianne Moore – Still Alice as Alice Howland**‡; Marion Cotillard – Two Days, One Night as Sandra Bya; Felicity Jones – The Theory of Everything as Jane Hawking; Rosamund Pike – Gone Girl as Amy Elliott-Dunne; Reese Witherspoon – Wild as Cheryl Strayed
**Best Actor in a Supporting Role**: **J. K. Simmons – Whiplash as Terence Fletcher**‡; Robert Duvall – The Judge as Judge Joseph Palmer; Ethan Hawke – Boyhood as Mason Evans, Sr.; Edward Norton – Birdman or (The Unexpected Virtue of Ignorance) as Mike Shiner; Mark Ruffalo – Foxcatcher as Dave Schultz	**Best Actress in a Supporting Role**: **Patricia Arquette – Boyhood as Olivia Evans**‡; Laura Dern – Wild as Bobbi Grey; Keira Knightley – The Imitation Game as Joan Clarke; Emma Stone – Birdman or (The Unexpected Virtue of Ignorance) as Sam Thomson; Meryl Streep – Into the Woods as The Witch
**Best Writing (Original Screenplay)**: **Birdman or (The Unexpected Virtue of Ignorance) – Alejandro G. Iñárritu, Nicolás Giacobone, Alexander Dinelaris Jr., and Armando Bo**‡; Boyhood – Richard Linklater; Foxcatcher – E. Max Frye and Dan Futterman; The Grand Budapest Hotel – Screenplay by Wes Anderson; Story by Wes Anderson and Hugo Guinness; Nightcrawler – Dan Gilroy	**Best Writing (Adapted Screenplay)**: **The Imitation Game – Graham Moore; based on the book Alan Turing: The Enigma by Andrew Hodges**‡; American Sniper – Jason Hall; based on the book by Chris Kyle with Scott McEwen and Jim DeFelice; Inherent Vice – Paul Thomas Anderson; based on the novel by Thomas Pynchon; The Theory of Everything – Anthony McCarten; based on the book Travelling to Infinity: My Life with Stephen by Jane Wilde Hawking; Whiplash – Damien Chazelle; based on his short film
**Best Animated Feature Film**: **Big Hero 6 – Don Hall, Chris Williams, and Roy Conli**‡; The Boxtrolls – Anthony Stacchi, Graham Annable, and Travis Knight; How to Train Your Dragon 2 – Dean DeBlois and Bonnie Arnold; Song of the Sea – Tomm Moore and Paul Young; The Tale of the Princess Kaguya – Isao Takahata and Yoshiaki Nishimura	**Best Foreign Language Film**: **Ida (Poland) in Polish – Directed by Paweł Pawlikowski**‡; Leviathan (Russia) in Russian – Directed by Andrey Zvyagintsev; Tangerines (Estonia) in Estonian and Russian – Directed by Zaza Urushadze; Timbuktu (Mauritania) in French – Directed by Abderrahmane Sissako; Wild Tales (Argentina) in Spanish – Directed by Damián Szifron
**Best Documentary (Feature)**: **Citizenfour – Laura Poitras, Mathilde Bonnefoy, and Dirk Wilutzky**‡; Finding Vivian Maier – John Maloof and Charlie Siskel; Last Days in Vietnam – Rory Kennedy and Keven McAlester; The Salt of the Earth – Wim Wenders, Juliano Ribeiro Salgado and David Rosier; Virunga – Orlando von Einsiedel and Joanna Natasegara	**Best Documentary (Short Subject)**: **Crisis Hotline: Veterans Press 1 – Ellen Goosenberg Kent and Dana Perry**‡; Joanna – Aneta Kopacz; Our Curse – Tomasz Śliwiński and Maciej Ślesicki; The Reaper – Gabriel Serra Arguello; White Earth – J. Christian Jensen
**Best Short Film (Live Action)**: **The Phone Call – Mat Kirkby and James Lucas**‡; Aya – Oded Binnun and Mihal Brezis; Boogaloo and Graham – Michael Lennox and Ronan Blaney; Butter Lamp – Hu Wei and Julien Féret; Parvaneh – Talkhon Hamzavi and Stefan Eichenberger	**Best Short Film (Animated)**: **Feast – Patrick Osborne and Kristina Reed**‡; The Bigger Picture – Daisy Jacobs and Christopher Hees; The Dam Keeper – Robert Kondo and Dice Tsutsumi; Me and My Moulton – Torill Kove; A Single Life – Joris Oprins
**Best Music (Original Score)**: **The Grand Budapest Hotel – Alexandre Desplat**‡; The Imitation Game – Alexandre Desplat; Interstellar – Hans Zimmer; Mr. Turner – Gary Yershon; The Theory of Everything – Jóhann Jóhannsson	**Best Music (Original Song)**: **"Glory" from Selma – Music and Lyrics by John Stephens and Lonnie Lynn**‡; "Everything Is Awesome" from The Lego Movie – Music and Lyrics by Shawn Patterson; "Grateful" from Beyond the Lights – Music and Lyrics by Diane Warren; "I'm Not Gonna Miss You" from Glen Campbell: I'll Be Me – Music and Lyrics by Glen Campbell and Julian Raymond; "Lost Stars" from Begin Again – Music and Lyrics by Gregg Alexander and Danielle Brisebois
**Best Sound Editing**: **American Sniper – Alan Robert Murray and Bub Asman**‡; Birdman or (The Unexpected Virtue of Ignorance) – Martin Hernández and Aaron Glascock; The Hobbit: The Battle of the Five Armies – Brent Burge and Jason Canovas; Interstellar – Richard King; Unbroken – Becky Sullivan and Andrew DeCristofaro	**Best Sound Mixing**: **Whiplash – Craig Mann, Ben Wilkins, and Thomas Curley**‡; American Sniper – John T. Reitz, Gregg Rudloff, and Walt Martin (posthumous nomination); Birdman or (The Unexpected Virtue of Ignorance) – Jon Taylor, Frank A. Montaño, and Thomas Varga; Interstellar – Gary A. Rizzo, Gregg Landaker, and Mark Weingarten; Unbroken – Jon Taylor, Frank A. Montaño, and David Lee
**Best Production Design**: **The Grand Budapest Hotel – Production Design: Adam Stockhausen; Set Decoration: Anna Pinnock**‡; The Imitation Game – Production Design: Maria Djurkovic; Set Decoration: Tatiana Macdonald; Interstellar – Production Design: Nathan Crowley; Set Decoration: Gary Fettis; Into the Woods – Production Design: Dennis Gassner; Set Decoration: Anna Pinnock; Mr. Turner – Production Design: Suzie Davies; Set Decoration: Charlotte Watts	**Best Cinematography**: **Birdman or (The Unexpected Virtue of Ignorance) – Emmanuel Lubezki**‡; The Grand Budapest Hotel – Robert Yeoman; Ida – Łukasz Żal and Ryszard Lenczewski; Mr. Turner – Dick Pope; Unbroken – Roger Deakins
**Best Makeup and Hairstyling**: **The Grand Budapest Hotel – Frances Hannon and Mark Coulier**‡; Foxcatcher – Bill Corso and Dennis Liddiard; Guardians of the Galaxy – Elizabeth Yianni-Georgiou and David White	**Best Costume Design**: **The Grand Budapest Hotel – Milena Canonero**‡; Inherent Vice – Mark Bridges; Into the Woods – Colleen Atwood; Maleficent – Anna B. Sheppard; Mr. Turner – Jacqueline Durran
**Best Film Editing**: **Whiplash – Tom Cross**‡; American Sniper – Joel Cox and Gary D. Roach; Boyhood – Sandra Adair; The Grand Budapest Hotel – Barney Pilling; The Imitation Game – William Goldenberg	**Best Visual Effects**: **Interstellar – Paul Franklin, Andrew Lockley, Ian Hunter, and Scott Fisher**‡; Captain America: The Winter Soldier – Dan DeLeeuw, Russell Earl, Bryan Grill, and Dan Sudick; Dawn of the Planet of the Apes – Joe Letteri, Dan Lemmon, Daniel Barrett, and Erik Winquist; Guardians of the Galaxy – Stéphane Ceretti, Nicolas Aithadi, Jonathan Fawkner, and Paul Corbould; X-Men: Days of Future Past – Richard Stammers, Lou Pecora, Tim Crosbie, and Cameron Waldbauer

=== Governors Awards ===
The Academy held its 6th Annual Governors Awards ceremony on November 8, 2014, during which the following awards were presented:

==== Honorary Awards ====
- To Jean-Claude Carrière, whose elegantly crafted screenplays elevate the art of screenwriting to the level of literature.
- To Hayao Miyazaki, a master storyteller whose animated artistry has inspired filmmakers and audiences around the world.
- Maureen O'Hara, one of Hollywood's brightest stars, whose inspiring performances glowed with passion, warmth and strength.

==== Jean Hersholt Humanitarian Award ====
- Harry Belafonte — For a lifetime of demonstrating how art is ennobled by ceaseless courage and conscience.

=== Films with multiple nominations and awards ===
The following 17 films received multiple nominations:

Films that received multiple nominations
Nominations	Film
9	Birdman or (The Unexpected Virtue of Ignorance)
9	The Grand Budapest Hotel
8	The Imitation Game
6	American Sniper
6	Boyhood
5	Foxcatcher
5	Interstellar
5	The Theory of Everything
5	Whiplash
4	Mr. Turner
3	Into the Woods
3	Unbroken
2	Guardians of the Galaxy
2	Ida
2	Inherent Vice
2	Selma
2	Wild

The following three films received multiple awards:

Films that received multiple awards
Awards	Film
4	Birdman or (The Unexpected Virtue of Ignorance)
4	The Grand Budapest Hotel
3	Whiplash

== Presenters and performers ==
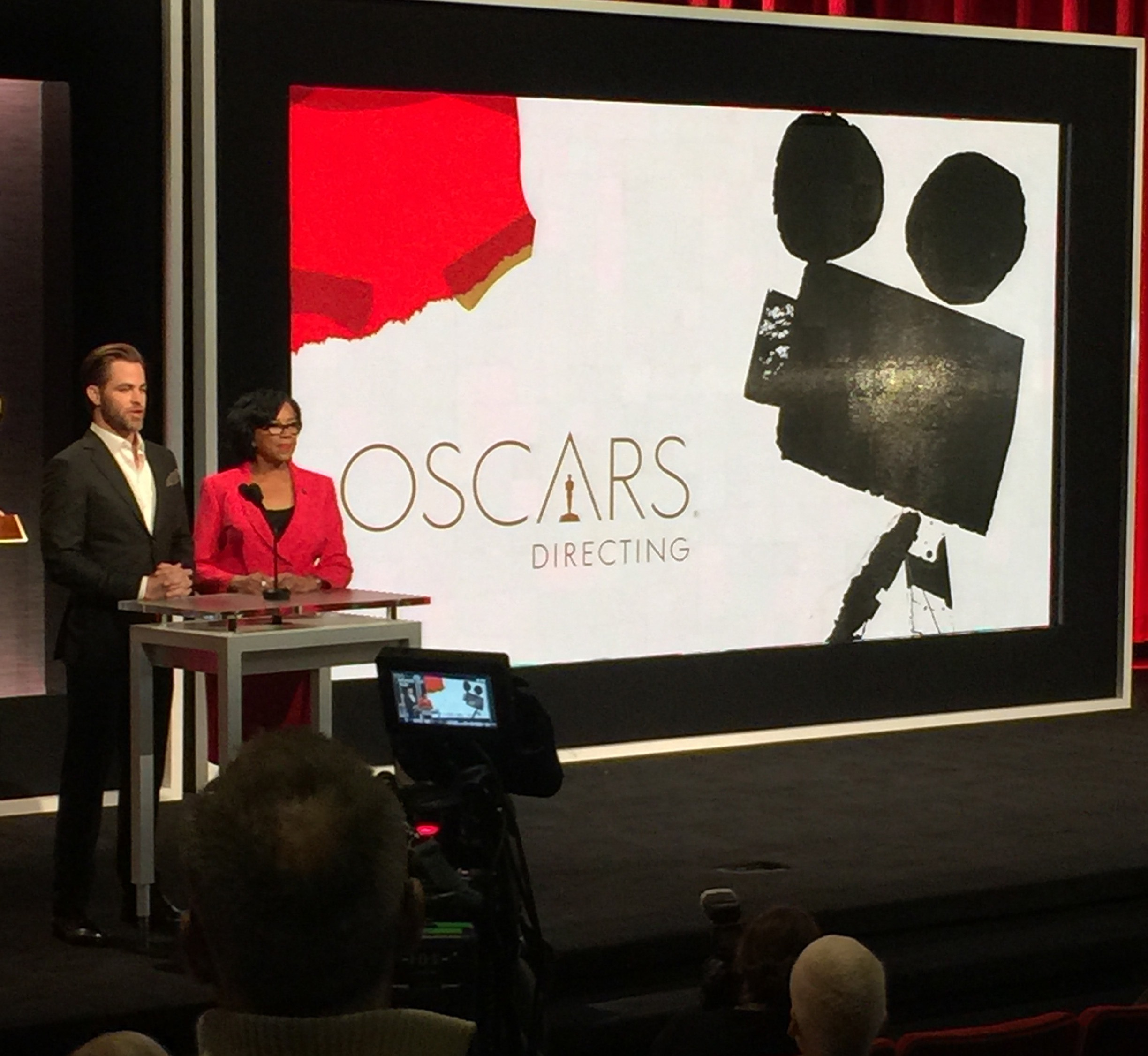
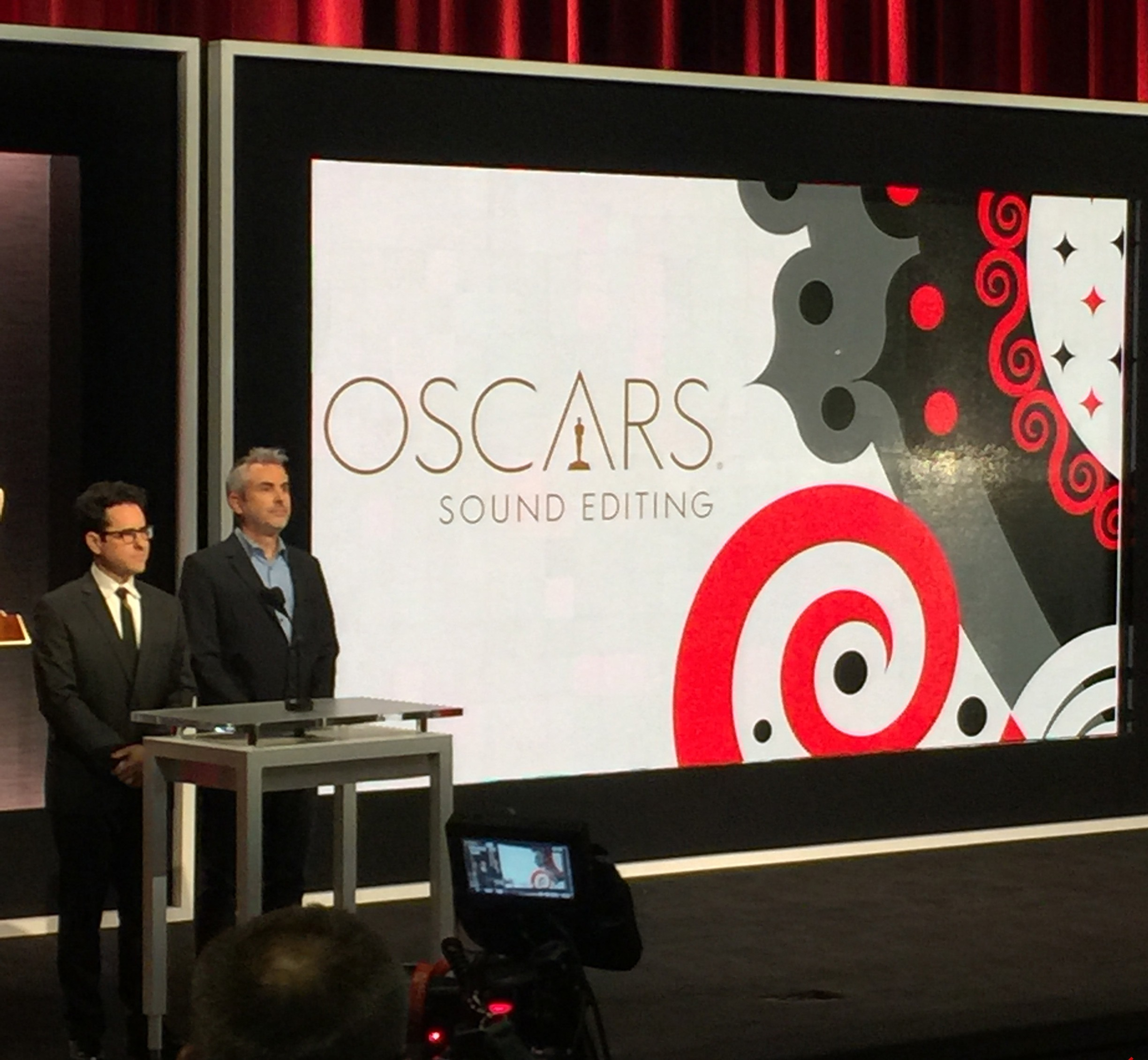
Actor Chris Pine and Academy President Cheryl Boone Isaacs (left) and directors J. J. Abrams and Alfonso Cuarón (right) at the 87th Academy Awards nominations announcement

The following individuals, listed in order of appearance, presented awards or performed musical numbers.

=== Presenters ===
Name(s)	Role
Cedering Fox	Announcer for the 87th annual Academy Awards
Lupita Nyong'o	Presenter of the award for Best Supporting Actor
Liam Neeson	Presenter of the films The Grand Budapest Hotel and American Sniper on the Best Picture segment
Dakota Johnson	Introducer of the performance of Best Original Song nominee "Lost Stars"
Jennifer Lopez; Chris Pine	Presenters of the award for Best Costume Design
Reese Witherspoon	Presenter of the award for Best Makeup and Hairstyling
Channing Tatum	Introducer of the six winners of the Team Oscar contest
Chiwetel Ejiofor; Nicole Kidman	Presenters of the award for Best Foreign Language Film
Shirley MacLaine	Presenter of the films Boyhood, The Theory of Everything and Birdman or (The Unexpected Virtue of Ignorance) on the Best Picture segment
Marion Cotillard	Introducer of the performance of Best Original Song nominee "Everything Is Awesome"
Jason Bateman; Kerry Washington	Presenters of the awards for Best Live Action Short Film and Best Documentary Short Subject
Viola Davis	Presenter of the segment of the Honorary Academy Awards and the Jean Hersholt Humanitarian Award
Gwyneth Paltrow	Introducer of the performance of Best Original Song nominee "I'm Not Gonna Miss You"
Margot Robbie; Miles Teller	Presenters of the segment of the Academy Awards for Technical Achievement and the Gordon E. Sawyer Award
Chris Evans; Sienna Miller	Presenters of the awards for Best Sound Mixing and Best Sound Editing
Jared Leto	Presenter of the award for Best Supporting Actress
Josh Hutcherson	Introducer of the performance of Best Original Song nominee "Grateful"
Ansel Elgort; Chloë Grace Moretz	Presenters of the award for Best Visual Effects
Kevin Hart; Anna Kendrick	Presenters of the award for Best Animated Short Film
Dwayne Johnson; Zoe Saldaña	Presenters of the award for Best Animated Feature Film
Cheryl Boone Isaacs (AMPAS president)	Special presentation highlighting the benefits of film and creativity
Felicity Jones; Chris Pratt	Presenters of the award for Best Production Design
Jessica Chastain; Idris Elba	Presenters of the award for Best Cinematography
Meryl Streep	Presenter of the "In Memoriam" tribute
Benedict Cumberbatch; Naomi Watts	Presenters of the award for Best Film Editing
Terrence Howard	Presenter of the films Whiplash, The Imitation Game, and Selma on the Best Picture segment
Jennifer Aniston; David Oyelowo	Presenters of the award for Best Documentary Feature
Octavia Spencer	Introducer of the performance of Best Original Song nominee "Glory"
Idina Menzel; John Travolta (Note: Introduced as "Glom Gazingo" in this segment.)	Presenters of the award for Best Original Song
Scarlett Johansson	Introducer of The Sound of Music 50th anniversary tribute and the performance of "The Sound of Music", "My Favorite Things", "Edelweiss" and "Climb Ev'ry Mountain" by Lady Gaga
Julie Andrews	Presenter of the award for Best Original Score
Eddie Murphy	Presenter of the award for Best Original Screenplay
Oprah Winfrey	Presenter of the award for Best Adapted Screenplay
Ben Affleck	Presenter of the award for Best Director
Cate Blanchett	Presenter of the award for Best Actor
Matthew McConaughey	Presenter of the award for Best Actress
Sean Penn	Presenter of the award for Best Picture

=== Performers ===
Name(s)	Role	Performed
Stephen Oremus	Musical arranger and conductor	Orchestral
Neil Patrick Harris; Anna Kendrick; Jack Black	Performers	"Moving Pictures" during the opening segment
Maroon 5	Performers	"Lost Stars" from Begin Again
Tegan and Sara; The Lonely Island; Will Arnett (as Batman) ?uestlove Mark Mothersbaugh	Performers	"Everything Is Awesome" from The Lego Movie
Tim McGraw	Performer	"I'm Not Gonna Miss You" from Glen Campbell: I'll Be Me
Rita Ora	Performer	"Grateful" from Beyond the Lights
Jennifer Hudson	Performer	"I Can't Let Go" during the annual "In Memoriam" tribute
Common; John Legend	Performers	"Glory" from Selma
Lady Gaga	Performer	"The Sound of Music", "My Favorite Things", "Edelweiss", and "Climb Ev'ry Mountain" from The Sound of Music

== Ceremony information ==
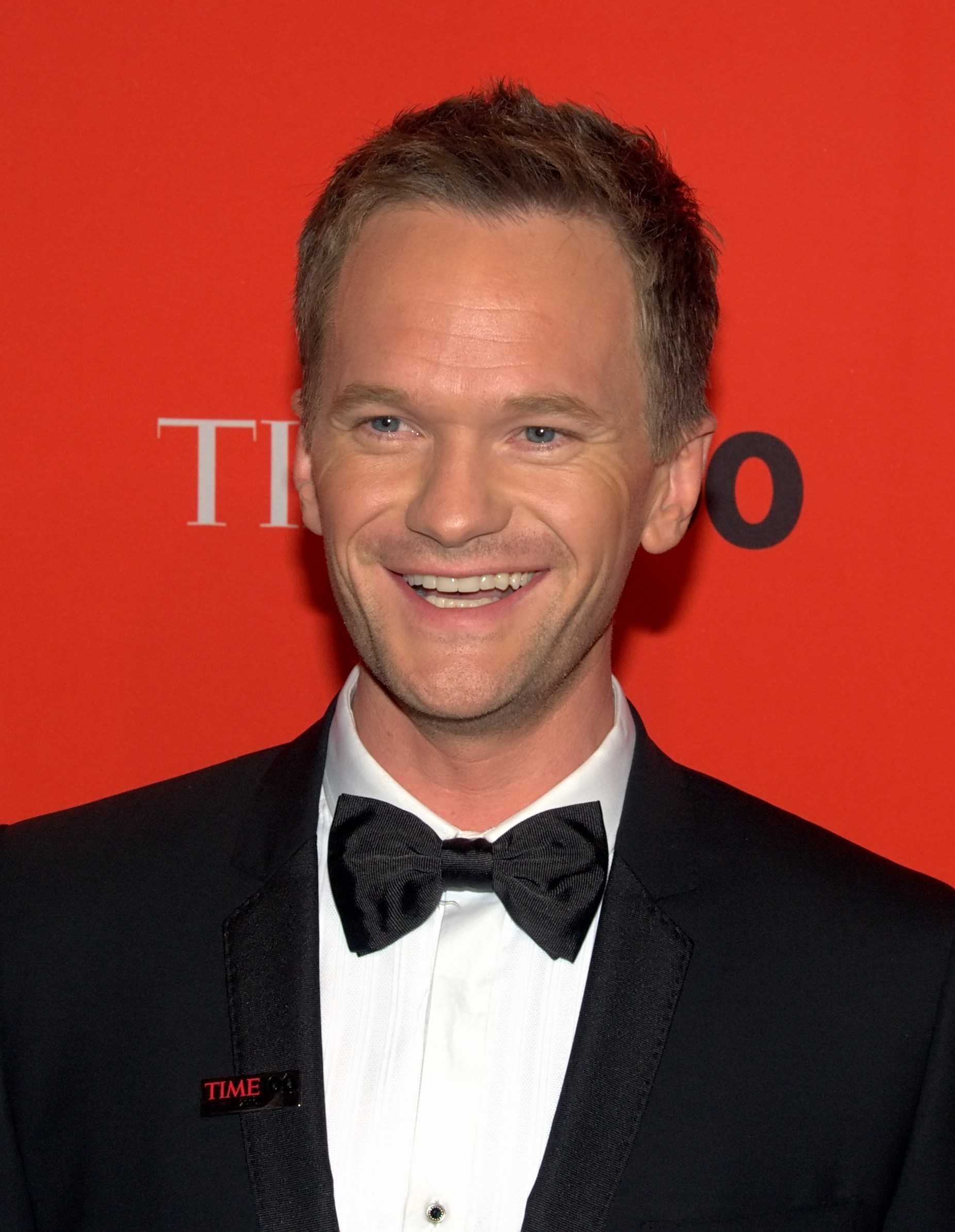
Neil Patrick Harris hosted the 87th Academy Awards.

Riding on the success of the previous year's ceremony which garnered its highest viewership figures in over a decade, the Academy rehired producers Neil Meron and Craig Zadan for the third consecutive year. "Their showmanship has elevated the show to new heights and we are excited to keep the momentum going with this creative partnership," said AMPAS president Cheryl Boone Isaacs in a press release announcing the selection. In October 2014, actor Neil Patrick Harris, who previously hosted four Tony Awards ceremonies between 2009 and 2013 and two Primetime Emmy Awards telecasts in 2009 and 2013, was chosen as host of the 2015 gala. Meron and Zadan explained their decision to hire the television and theatre star saying, "We are thrilled to have Neil host the Oscars. We have known him his entire adult life, and we have watched him explode as a great performer in feature films, television and stage. To work with him on the Oscars is the perfect storm, all of his resources and talent coming together on a global stage." Harris expressed that it was truly an honor and a thrill to be asked to host Academy Awards commenting, "I grew up watching the Oscars and was always in such awe of some of the greats who hosted the show. To be asked to follow in the footsteps of Johnny Carson, Billy Crystal, Ellen DeGeneres, and everyone else who had the great fortune of hosting is a bucket list dream come true."

Shortly after his selection, several reports were released indicating that DeGeneres and other comedians such as 2005 ceremony host Chris Rock and actress Julia Louis-Dreyfus declined the offer to host the program, and Harris was a last-minute choice as emcee. Nevertheless, both Meron and Zadan denied such allegations and insisted that Harris was their only choice saying, "After every Oscar show there is always a discussion as to who will host the next one. Many names are discussed and sometimes even floated without there being any formal offers. At times, these casual discussions take on a life of their own, and some are eager to break a story without knowing the facts. Neil Patrick Harris received the Academy's formal offer."

Several other people were also involved with the production of the ceremony. Stephen Oremus served as musical director and conductor for the event. Derek McLane returned to design a new set and stage design for the show. During the ceremony, actor Channing Tatum introduced a group called "Team Oscar", which consisted of six young film students from colleges across the country selected by AMPAS whose role was to deliver Oscar statuettes to the presenters during the gala. Oscar-winning husband-and-wife songwriters Robert Lopez and Kristen Anderson-Lopez composed Harris's opening number entitled "Moving Pictures". Musicians Questlove and Mark Mothersbaugh and actor Will Arnett made cameos during the performance of Best Original Song nominee "Everything Is Awesome".

=== Box office performance of nominated films ===
North American box office gross for Best Picture nominees
Film	Pre-nomination (Before Jan. 16)	Post-nomination (Jan. 16-Feb. 22)	Post-awards (After Feb. 22)	Total
American Sniper	$3.4 million	$316 million	$30.1 million	$350 million
Birdman or (The Unexpected Virtue of Ignorance)	$26.6 million	$11.2 million	$4.6 million	$42.3 million
Boyhood	$24.4 million	$942,668	$36,767	$25.3 million
The Grand Budapest Hotel	$59.1 million	N/A	N/A	$59.1 million
The Imitation Game	$42.8 million	$41.1 million	$7.2 million	$91.2 million
Selma	$16.6 million	$33.0 million	$2.5 million	$52.1 million
The Theory of Everything	$26.2 million	$7.9 million	$1.8 million	$35.9 million
Whiplash	$6.2 million	$5.1 million	$1.8 million	$13.1 million

For the first time since 2007, none of the Best Picture nominees had grossed $100 million before the nominations were announced (compared with three from the previous year). The combined gross of the eight Best Picture nominees at the American and Canadian box offices was $205 million, with an average of $25.6 million per film.

None of the eight Best Picture nominees was among the top 50 releases in box office during nominations. When the nominations were announced on January 15, 2015, The Grand Budapest Hotel was the highest-grossing film among the Best Picture nominees with $59.1 million in domestic box office receipts. The Imitation Game was the second-highest-grossing film with $42.7 million; this was followed by Birdman or (The Unexpected Virtue of Ignorance) ($26.6 million), The Theory of Everything ($26.2 million), Boyhood ($24.3 million), Selma ($16.5 million), Whiplash ($6.2 million), and finally American Sniper ($3.3 million). (Note: American Sniper opened in wide release on January 16, where it became the number-one film at the American box office for three consecutive weekends. The film eventually became the highest grossing film at the American and Canadian box office released in 2014.)

Of the top 50 grossing movies of the year, 23 nominations went to 13 films on the list. Only Big Hero 6 (9th), How to Train Your Dragon 2 (16th), and Into the Woods (25th) were nominated for Best Picture, Best Animated Feature or any of the directing, acting or screenwriting awards. The other top 50 box office hits that earned nominations were Guardians of the Galaxy (1st), Captain America: The Winter Soldier (3rd), The Lego Movie (4th), Maleficent (6th), The Hobbit: The Battle of the Five Armies (7th), X-Men: Days of Future Past (8th), Dawn of the Planet of the Apes (10th), Interstellar (15th), and Unbroken (27th).

This was the first time since the 73rd Academy Awards in 2000 the highest-grossing film of the year worldwide (Mission Impossible 2) had no Oscar nominations. The highest-grossing film of 2014 worldwide was Transformers: Age of Extinction but didn't receive any Oscar nominations.

=== Criticism regarding lack of diversity among nominees ===
Shortly after the nominations were announced, many news media outlets highlighted the lack of racial diversity amongst the nominees in major award categories. According to Tatiana Siegel of The Hollywood Reporter, it was the second time since 1998 that all 20 acting nominees were of Caucasian descent. The New York Times columnist David Carr pointed out the omission of Ava DuVernay and David Oyelowo in directing and lead acting categories. He also noted that these nominations heavily contrasted last year's nominations that included Best Picture winner 12 Years a Slave and Best Supporting Actress winner Lupita Nyong'o.

As a result, the Academy was ridiculed by the Black Twitter community and became the target of hashtag movements such as #OscarsSoWhite and #WhiteOscars. In addition, U.S. Democratic Party Congressman Tony Cárdenas wrote a letter voicing his concerns regarding AMPAS and diversity, stating: "While the issue of diversity in the entertainment industry is a much deeper problem, without an easy solution, it is unfortunate to see such a revered American institution fail to fully reflect our nation." Cárdenas went on to say that he was willing to work with Academy officials in making the entertainment industry more representative of different ethnicities.

In response to criticism about lack of diversity, AMPAS President Isaacs told reporter Sandy Cohen from the Associated Press that the Academy was "committed to seeking out diversity of voice and opinion." She refrained from addressing the lack of diversity of that year's nominees, although stated that she was proud of all the nominees and praised Selma as a "fantastic motion picture".

Several days before the awards gala, the National Action Network led by civil rights activist Al Sharpton and several other organizations planned to demonstrate near the ceremony at the Dolby Theatre before and during the telecast. However, the protest was canceled in light of DuVernay pleading with black activists to instead pursue a direct dialogue with Academy leadership.

=== Critical reception ===
The show received a mixed reception from media publications. Some media outlets were more critical of the show. HitFix television columnist Alan Sepinwall commented, "It ran on and on and on and on so much that when host Neil Patrick Harris finally got around to paying off a running gag about his Oscar predictions being locked in a box on stage left, he had to stop to explain the bit to us all over again." In addition, he observed, "Either the production consumed Harris, the writing failed him, or he picked a very strange night to go off-brand." Hal Boedeker of the Orlando Sentinel wrote, "Harris headlined a blah production number to start the show. His running shtick about Oscar predictions grew tiresome." He concluded his review saying, "The music saved this Oscar telecast, but it was still a long, tedious show. The highlight reel will make it look better than it was." Television critic Alessandra Stanley from The New York Times said, "Oscar nights almost always drag on too long, but this one was a slog almost from the very beginning." She also quipped, "The political speeches were somber, but they turned out to be more lively and bracing than any of Harris' skits."

Other media outlets received the broadcast more positively. Television critic Matthew Gilbert of The Boston Globe commented, "Neil Patrick Harris was very Neil Patrick Harrisy Sunday night in his first round as Oscars host. He was calm and cheerful and vanilla as usual, always ready with a lightly snarky joke and always eager to jump into a big production number involving old-timey choreography. He's a pro at hosting, after his Tony and Emmy gigs, and it showed during the ABC telecast in his endlessly relaxed and open energy." He also wrote despite several production gaffes and an uneven pace, the show moved along "with a minimum of pain." The Times-Picayune columnist Dave Walker wrote, "Harris played it like he was basically born to do it—light on his feet working the crowd or at center stage without his pants, winkingly self-deprecating, moving-right-along when his prepared material didn't land (which was too often)—and he now may have a job for life if he wants it." Furthermore, praised the cast and several musical numbers from the show. David Rooney of The Hollywood Reporter quipped, "Harris displayed winning charm and appealing insouciance, sprinkling the gags with moments of self-deprecation." In addition, he remarked that several of the acceptance speeches and musical numbers provided a mix of humor, fun, and sincerity.

=== Ratings and reception ===
The American telecast on ABC drew in an average 37.26 million people over its length, which was a 15% decrease from the previous year's ceremony. An estimated 63 million total viewers watched all or part of the awards. The show also earned lower Nielsen ratings compared to the previous ceremony with 20.6% of households watching over a 33 share. In addition, the program scored a lower 18–49 demo rating with an 11.0 ratings over a 26 share. It was the lowest viewership for an Academy Awards telecast since the 81st ceremony held in 2009.

In July 2015, the ceremony presentation received eight nominations for the 67th Primetime Emmys. The following month, the ceremony won one of those nominations for Outstanding Technical Direction, Camera Work, and Video Control for a Limited Series, Movie, or Special (Technical Directors: Eric Becker, Rick Edwards, John Pritchett, and Rod Wardell; Cameras: Rob Balton, Danny Bonilla, Robert Del Russo, David Eastwood, Suzanne Ebner, Pat Gleason, Ed Horton, Marc Hunter, Jay Kulick, Brian Lataille, Tore Livia, Steve Martyniuk, Lyn Noland, Rob Palmer, David Plakos, Camera, Jofre Romero, Danny Webb, Mark Whitman, and Easter Xua; Video Control: Terrance Ho, Guy Jones, and Keith Winikoff).

== "In Memoriam" ==
The annual "In Memoriam" segment was presented by actress Meryl Streep. The montage featured an excerpt of the "Love Theme" from Sophie's Choice by Marvin Hamlisch. At the conclusion of the tribute, singer Jennifer Hudson performed the song "I Can't Let Go" from the television series Smash.

- Mickey Rooney – Actor
- Paul Mazursky – Director, screenwriter
- Geoffrey Holder – Actor
- Nadia Bronson – Marketing executive
- James Garner – Actor
- Elizabeth Peña – Actress
- Alan Hirschfield – Executive
- Edward Herrmann – Actor
- Maya Angelou – Poet
- Lorenzo Semple, Jr. – Screenwriter
- George L. Little – Costume designer
- James Rebhorn – Actor
- Menahem Golan – Producer, director
- James Shigeta – Actor
- Anita Ekberg – Actress
- Paul Apted – Sound editor
- H. R. Giger – Special effects artist
- Sanford E. Reisenbach – Marketing executive
- Malik Bendjelloul – Documentarian
- Virna Lisi – Actress
- Louis Jourdan – Actor
- Gordon Willis – Cinematographer
- Richard Attenborough – Actor, director
- Oswald Morris – Cinematographer
- Tom Rolf – Film editor
- L. M. Kit Carson – Writer, actor
- Ruby Dee – Actress
- Samuel Goldwyn, Jr. – Producer
- Martha Hyer – Actress
- Andrew V. McLaglen – Director
- Jimmy T. Murakami – Animator, director
- Robin Williams – Actor
- William Greaves – Documentarian
- Joseph Viskocil – Special effects artist
- Rod Taylor – Actor
- Stewart Stern – Writer
- Luise Rainer – Actress
- Dick Smith – Makeup artist
- Lauren Bacall – Actress
- Walt Martin – Sound mixer
- Charles Champlin – Film critic
- Pennie Dupont – Casting director
- Herb Jeffries – Actor
- Misty Upham – Actress
- Eli Wallach – Actor
- Gabriel García Márquez – Writer
- Frank Yablans – Studio executive
- Alain Resnais – Director
- Bob Hoskins – Actor
- Mike Nichols – Director

== See also ==
- 21st Screen Actors Guild Awards
- 35th Golden Raspberry Awards
- 57th Grammy Awards
- 67th Primetime Emmy Awards
- 68th British Academy Film Awards
- 69th Tony Awards
- 72nd Golden Globe Awards
- List of submissions to the 87th Academy Awards for Best Foreign Language Film
