= Tim Crosbie =

Australian visual effects supervisor

- Occupation: Visual effects supervisor
- Years active: 1995–present

Tim Crosbie is an Australian visual effects supervisor.

He was nominated for the Best Visual Effects at the 87th Academy Awards for his work on the film X-Men: Days of Future Past. His nomination was shared with Richard Stammers, Lou Pecora, and Cameron Waldbauer. He is part of Rising Sun Pictures production team which does visual effects.
