= The Reaper (2013 film) =

- Film poster
- Directed by: Gabriel Serra Argüello
- Produced by: Henner Hofmann; Karla Bukantz
- Release date: 2013
- Running time: 29 minutes
- Countries: Mexico; Nicaragua
- Language: Spanish

The Reaper (Spanish: La parka) is a 2013 biographical documentary film by Gabriel Serra Argüello about Efrain Jimenez Garcia, a slaughterhouse worker who has been killing 500 bulls a day, six days a week, for the past 25 years. The Reaper was a nominee for the Academy Award for Best Documentary (Short Subject) at the 87th Academy Awards.

The film recounts how Efrain first started working in the slaughterhouse and how constantly being around death has begun to take its toll on him, with nightmares about the tables being turned and animals taking revenge on him.

== Awards and nominations ==
Awards
| Award | Date of ceremony | Category | Recipients and nominees | Result |
|---|---|---|---|---|
| Academy Award | February 22, 2015 | Best Short Subject Documentary | Gabriel Serra Arguello | Nominated |
