= Lou Pecora =

American visual effects artist

- Education: California State University
- Occupation: Visual effects artist

Lou Pecora is an American visual effects artist. He was nominated for an Academy Award in the category Best Visual Effects for the film X-Men: Days of Future Past.

== Selected filmography ==
- X-Men: Days of Future Past (2014; co-nominated for an Oscar with Richard Stammers, Tim Crosbie and Cameron Waldbauer)
