= X-Men: Days of Future Past =

2014 film by Bryan Singer

- Theatrical release poster
- Directed by: Bryan Singer
- Screenplay by: Simon Kinberg
- Story by: Jane Goldman; Simon Kinberg; Matthew Vaughn
- Based on: X-Men by: Stan Lee; Jack Kirby
- Produced by: Bryan Singer; Lauren Shuler Donner; Simon Kinberg; Hutch Parker
- Starring: Hugh Jackman; James McAvoy; Michael Fassbender; Jennifer Lawrence; Halle Berry; Anna Paquin; Elliot Page (Note: Credited as Ellen Page; the film was released before Page came out as transgender.); Peter Dinklage; Ian McKellen; Patrick Stewart
- Cinematography: Newton Thomas Sigel
- Edited by: John Ottman
- Music by: John Ottman
- Production companies: 20th Century Fox; Marvel Entertainment; The Donners' Company; Bad Hat Harry Productions; Kinberg Genre; Down Productions
- Distributed by: 20th Century Fox
- Release dates: May 10, 2014 (Javits Center); May 23, 2014 (United States)
- Running time: 131 minutes
- Countries: United States; United Kingdom
- Language: English
- Budget: $200–205 million
- Box office: $747.9 million

X-Men: Days of Future Past is a 2014 superhero film based on the Marvel Comics superhero team the X-Men. It is the seventh installment in the X-Men film series and serves as a sequel to both X-Men: The Last Stand (2006) and X-Men: First Class (2011), as well as a follow-up to The Wolverine (2013). Directed by Bryan Singer and written by Simon Kinberg, the film features an ensemble cast including Hugh Jackman, James McAvoy, Michael Fassbender, Jennifer Lawrence, Halle Berry, Anna Paquin, Elliot Page, Peter Dinklage, Ian McKellen, and Patrick Stewart. The story, inspired by the 1981 Uncanny X-Men storyline "Days of Future Past" by Chris Claremont and John Byrne, focuses on two time periods, with Logan traveling back in time to 1973 to change history and prevent an event that results in unspeakable destruction for both humans and mutants.

Matthew Vaughn had directed X-Men: First Class and was set to return in Days of Future Past but instead left for Kingsman: The Secret Service and the 2015 version of Fantastic Four. Singer, who had directed the first two X-Men films and produced First Class, returned as director, and brought along most of the crew from those productions. With a budget of $205 million, the film's principal photography began in Montreal, Quebec, in April 2013, and concluded in August, with additional filming and pick-ups taking place in November 2013 and February 2014. Twelve companies handled the visual effects.

X-Men: Days of Future Past premiered in New York City on May 10, 2014, and was theatrically released in the United States on May 23, by 20th Century Fox. The film received positive reviews from critics, who deemed it one of the finest in the series. It grossed $747 million, making it the sixth-highest-grossing film of 2014, and received an Academy Award nomination for Best Visual Effects. A sequel, X-Men: Apocalypse was released in 2016.

== Plot ==
In the near future, robots called Sentinels hunt and kill mutants, as well as humans who either possess the genetic potential to have mutant offspring or try to protect them. In Moscow, they attack X-Men survivors Kitty Pryde, Colossus, Blink, Warpath, Bishop, Iceman, and Sunspot. The mutants sacrifice themselves to buy Kitty enough time to send Bishop's consciousness a few days into the past to warn the others of the coming attack and ensure their survival.

Having averted the attack, the group retreats to a remote Chinese temple and are joined by Storm, Logan, Magneto, and the restored Charles Xavier. (Note: As depicted in The Wolverine (2013)) Xavier explains that the Sentinel program was originally conceived by Bolivar Trask, a weapons designer whom Mystique assassinated in 1973. In response, the government approved his program and captured, tortured, and experimented on her, using her DNA to create Sentinels capable of adapting to any mutant power. Xavier plans to use Kitty's powers to go back in time to 1973 and prevent Trask's assassination in the hopes of altering the future. However, upon learning that time-traveling too far would kill Xavier, Logan volunteers instead, as his regenerative abilities would allow him to survive.

Awakening in 1973, Logan goes to the X-Mansion, learning from Hank McCoy that the school has been closed for years due to the Vietnam War and that Magneto has been imprisoned for assassinating John F. Kennedy. A young, broken Xavier has turned to alcoholism and uses a serum that allows him to walk, but at the cost of his telepathic abilities. Hoping to reunite with Mystique, Xavier agrees to help Logan. They recruit Quicksilver, a mutant who can run at superhuman speeds, and break Magneto out of the Pentagon, learning that he was in fact attempting to save Kennedy, who was also a mutant.

Mystique discovers Trask has been experimenting on mutants and plots to assassinate him at the Paris Peace Accords, but Xavier, McCoy, and Logan foil her attempt. Magneto attempts to kill Mystique, believing this would change the future; McCoy fights him, allowing Mystique to escape but publicly exposing them as mutants. Trask takes advantage of this and convinces President Richard Nixon to authorize the Sentinel program.

Magneto retrieves his helmet to shield himself from Xavier's telepathy (Note: As depicted in X-Men: First Class (2011)) and secretly takes control of Trask's Sentinel prototypes by infusing them with steel. Returning to the X-Mansion, Xavier abandons the serum and, by reading Logan's mind, communicates with his future self, who inspires him to protect the future between mutants and humans. Xavier uses his mutant-tracking computer Cerebro to find Mystique, and he, McCoy, and Logan travel to Washington, D.C. to stop her from assassinating Trask.

At a ceremony where Nixon unveils the Sentinels, the three search for Mystique. Magneto appears, activates the Sentinels, and barricades the White House by lifting RFK Stadium over it. During the battle, Magneto impales Logan with a rebar and throws him into the Potomac River. Nixon, Trask, and a disguised Mystique retreat to the White House Bunker. However, Magneto rips the bunker out of the building to kill everyone inside. In 2023, the X-Men make their last stand as an onslaught of Sentinels attacks the temple, with Storm, Colossus, Iceman and most of the mutants perishing while trying to buy more time; only Charles, Kitty, an injured Magneto and Wolverine remain. In 1973, Mystique reveals herself and subdues Magneto with a plastic gun, saving Nixon and his cabinet. Before she can kill Trask, Xavier telepathically convinces her to spare him, leading the public to realize that a mutant saved the President and his cabinet. As a result, the Sentinel program is decommissioned, altering the timeline and erasing the dark future of 2023 from history. The mutants in the past depart separately; Trask is later arrested for selling military secrets to foreign governments.

Logan reawakens in 2023 at the X-Mansion to find that Xavier's school is thriving and the X-Men are all alive, including Jean Grey and Scott Summers. Logan asks Xavier for information about modern history from 1973 to the present. Back in 1973, Logan is rescued by Mystique, having disguised herself as Major William Stryker.

In a post-credits scene set in ancient Egypt, a crowd chants to En Sabah Nur, who telekinetically elevates rocks to build pyramids as his Four Horsemen observe from afar.

== Cast ==
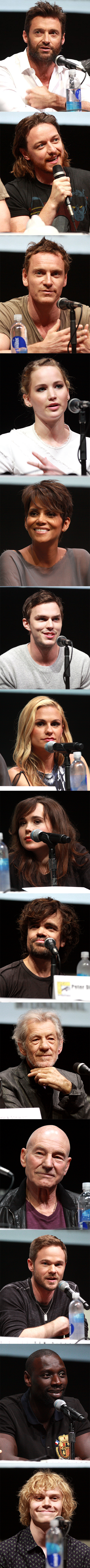
The cast of X-Men: Days of Future Past promoting the film at the 2013 San Diego Comic-Con. From top to bottom: Jackman, McAvoy, Fassbender, Lawrence, Berry, Hoult, Paquin, Page, Dinklage, McKellen, Stewart, Ashmore, Sy, and Peters.
- Hugh Jackman as Logan / Wolverine:
  A mutant with accelerated healing, heightened animal-like senses, and—in 1973—retractable bone claws; in the future, his skeleton and claws are laced with adamantium in his body, making him virtually invulnerable. His healing factor also slows his aging, allowing him to live above the lifespan of an ordinary human. Jackman noted how Wolverine driving the plot in spite of his gruff personality made for interesting story choices, as "if you want someone to go back to take someone's head off, fantastic, but he's really got to go back and almost act in parts as inspiration, as mentor, as guide, because he can't do it all on his own, which is always his preferred method".
- James McAvoy / Patrick Stewart as Charles Xavier / Professor X:
  A mutant pacifist and the world's most powerful telepath. He is also the founder of Xavier's School for Gifted Youngsters, and the leader of the X-Men. Singer described the younger Xavier as "a very different beast from First Class's feckless playboy. He's a wounded animal, bearded, long-haired, filled with rage at the way the world has treated him". Kinberg said the film was intended to be the story of the younger Xavier beginning to "become the Professor Xavier we know" as Wolverine mentored him.
- Michael Fassbender / Ian McKellen as Erik Lehnsherr / Magneto:
  A powerful mutant who can manipulate magnetic fields. While he disagrees with Xavier due to a wish to prove mutant-kind's superiority, they revert to being allies as the older Erik helps the X-Men battle against Sentinels in the future.
- Jennifer Lawrence as Raven / Mystique:
  A mutant with shapeshifting ability, and also Xavier's childhood friend and adopted sister. Singer said Mystique "is less innocent, evolved, getting closer to where Mystique was in X2 (2003)". Lawrence had suffered skin irritations from the full body make-up used in First Class, and the process was changed so from the neck down it would be a bodysuit, whose zipper was digitally removed in post-production. As a result, the make-up process was reduced from eight hours to three. The make-up team at Legacy Effects sculpted Mystique's scales digitally, making them shorter in size and placed in a way that they would accentuate Lawrence's face.
- Halle Berry as Storm:
  A mutant who can manipulate weather and is one of the most battle-tested and powerful X-Men. Asked if her pregnancy affected her role, Berry replied, "I wasn't in as much as I was meant to be. My ever-growing belly was posing a constant challenge! What I could do was getting more limited so the role that I play is so different from what it could have been, due to my surprise pregnancy". According to Kinberg, Berry had another scene in the film that was cut because of Berry's limited schedule.
- Anna Paquin as Rogue:
  A mutant who could absorb the life force and mutant abilities of anyone she touches until taking a cure in The Last Stand. Kinberg wrote a shorter part for Paquin than initially planned because she had little time to be on set. During post-production, Paquin's role was reduced to a cameo after most of her scenes were cut; these scenes were later restored on an alternate version of the film, which was released to home media. According to Kinberg, Rogue was to be rescued by the future Magneto and Xavier to provide the elder characters a mission, "something like Unforgiven (1992)". Eventually, the producers felt it was a subplot that did "not service the main story", and reshot scenes to replace them. However, she was still featured in the film's various promotional materials. Paquin later stated that she still had fun making the film and did not mind that the majority of her scenes had been cut from it.
- Elliot Page as Kitty Pryde:
  A mutant who can pass through solid objects. As the youngest member of the X-Men, she plays an important role in their fight for survival. Singer described Pryde as the prime facilitator and that Pryde's phasing ability enables time-travel to happen. Kinberg, when asked why Pryde is not the time-traveler in the film adaptation of the comic-book story, said, "[If] we tried to follow the original and use Kitty, we had a problem because Ellen was 25 years old and she'd be -20 in the First Class era".
- Peter Dinklage as Dr. Bolivar Trask:
  A military scientist and the head of Trask Industries who creates a range of robots called Sentinels, designed to find and destroy mutants. Dinklage said Trask "sees what he's doing as a good thing—[his ambition is] definitely blind and he's quite arrogant. He has striven all his life for a certain respect and attention". He also said Trask is opposed by Richard Nixon. Singer said he is a fan of Dinklage and of the television series Game of Thrones (2011-2019) in which Dinklage stars as Tyrion Lannister, which inspired him to cast Dinklage. The actor, who has achondroplasia, a form of dwarfism, said he was attracted to Trask because the character was not written as a dwarf or defined as such.
- Nicholas Hoult as Hank / Beast:
  A mutant with leonine attributes, super-strength, agility, reflexes and enhanced speed. Hoult plays the character in scenes set in 1973 while Kelsey Grammer makes an uncredited cameo appearance as Beast in the future setting. The cameo was added because the writers felt Hoult's Beast was "such a sweet, young character" that audiences would want to learn he survived. Once Grammer learned of this opportunity to return as Beast, a character he had enjoyed playing in The Last Stand, he called Singer asking to get involved, and was flown from New York in secret to avoid drawing attention.
- Shawn Ashmore as Bobby / Iceman:
  A mutant who can create and manipulate ice. Ashmore said about his role, "In the first X-Men I had to make a rose for Rogue but that was the extent of the character, so it's cool to see over these four movies going from that to X2—where you sort of see him do an ice wall—and in X3 he finally gets to battle, and in Days of Future Past we're soldiers".
- Omar Sy as Bishop:
  A mutant who can absorb energy and redirect it in kinetic blasts. Singer said Bishop, along with Warpath, Sunspot and Blink, are not fresh recruits. He said, "they're more refugees that are living day to day in this hideously ruined world. They don't have much hope in the future. They're on the run and they join forces with the remaining X-Men to try to do this one last attempt at fixing the world".
- Evan Peters as Peter / Quicksilver:
  A mutant who can move, speak and think at supersonic speeds. Peters described Quicksilver as "very fast, he talks quick, he moves quick. Everything else is very slow compared to him, it's like he's always at the ATM waiting for the bastard in front of him to finish".
- Josh Helman as Maj. Bill Stryker:
  A military officer who hates mutants. Helman was originally chosen to play a younger version of Juggernaut before that character was removed from the script. Brian Cox, who portrayed adult Stryker in X2, appears in archive footage.
- Daniel Cudmore as Colossus:
  A mutant who can transform his body into organic steel, which grants him superhuman strength, stamina, and durability while in that form. Cudmore was asked whether he trained for his role, he replied, "I didn't have a ton of time to get film ready for this. A trainer friend of mine from Vancouver put together a quick little workout program for me. Since the role was for Colossus, I was aiming to bulk up a bit and get stronger. I ended up eating a lot more. Because of how much I was eating, I had to eat every 2-3 hours to keep my calories up".
- Fan Bingbing as Blink:
  A mutant who can create portals to teleport. Fan said the film was the first of a five X-Men movie contract she signed with 20th Century Fox.
- Adan Canto as Sunspot:
  A mutant with the ability to project solar energy and create flames while also possessing solar-powered strength and flight. Canto had read the X-Men comics as a child, and after he was cast, went back to research the comics to further understand Sunspot's character.
- Booboo Stewart as Warpath:
  A bowie knife-wielding mutant and expert tracker with super agility, reflexes, stamina, acute senses and enhanced strength. In preparation for the role, Stewart gained 50 pounds and grew his hair much longer than usual.

Additionally, Famke Janssen and James Marsden reprise their roles as Jean Grey and Scott Summers, respectively, in cameo appearances. Lucas Till reprises his role as Havok. Evan Jonigkeit portrays Toad. Gregg Lowe portrays Ink. X-Men comic book writers Len Wein and Chris Claremont appear as United States congressmen. Michael Lerner plays Senator Brickman. Mark Camacho portrays U.S. President Richard Nixon. Zehra Leverman portrays Quicksilver's mother Ms. Maximoff. Singer cameos as a man with a small film camera as Magneto walks away after Mystique's escape in Paris. In a post-credits scene, Brendan Pedder portrays the ancient mutant En Sabah Nur.

== Production ==
=== Development ===
Producer Lauren Shuler Donner stated in August 2006 that a continuation of the X-Men main film series would require a renegotiation. New cast members of X-Men: The Last Stand (2006) were signed, while the older cast members were not. Donner said, "There is forty years worth of stories. I've always wanted to do Days of Future Past and there are just really a lot of stories yet to be told". She later pitched the idea of a fourth installment of the X-Men franchise to director Bryan Singer, following the completion of the prequel X-Men: First Class (2011). In March 2011, Donner said the film was in "active development at Fox"; she said, "We took the treatment to Fox and they love it ... And X4 leads into X5".

20th Century Fox saw X-Men: First Class as the first film of a new X-Men trilogy. Donner compared the franchise plans to the darker, more mature content of the Harry Potter film series. Early reports said Matthew Vaughn and Singer were returning to direct and produce the sequel, respectively. While still attached to the project as a director, Vaughn said, "First Class is similar to Batman Begins (2005), where you have the fun of introducing the characters and getting to know them, but that takes time. But with the second one, you can just get on with it and have a rollicking good time. That's the main difference between Batman Begins and The Dark Knight (2008)". Describing the possible beginning of the film, Vaughn said, "I thought it would be fun to open with the Kennedy assassination, and we reveal that the magic bullet was controlled by Magneto". Singer said the film could be set around the civil rights movement or the Vietnam War, and that Wolverine could once again be featured. Singer also talked about "changing history" in an interview with Empire magazine. He said he does not want people to panic about events in the past "erasing" the storylines of the previous X-Men films, as he believes in multiverses, explaining the possibility of certain events can exist equally in the histories of alternate universes.

In 2019, Vaughn revealed that Days of Future Past was originally planned to be the third installment in the trilogy but the studio decided otherwise which contributed to his decision to leave the project. Speaking with ComingSoon.net he said "That’s one of the reasons I didn’t continue, because they didn’t listen to me. My plan was 'First Class,' then second film was new young Wolverine in the 70’s to continue those characters, my version of the X-Men. So you’d really get to know all of them, and my finale was gonna be 'Days of Future Past.' That was gonna be my number three where you bring them all… because what’s bigger than bringing in McKellen and Michael and Stewart and James and bringing them all together? When I finished the 'Days of Future Past' script with it ready to go I looked at it and said, 'I really think it would be fun to cast Tom Hardy or someone as the young Wolverine and then bring it all together at the end.' Fox read 'Days of Future Past' and went 'Oh, this is too good! We’re doing it now!'". He further commented "Hollywood doesn’t understand pacing. Their executives are driving 100 miles-per-hour looking in the rear-view mirror and not understanding why they crash."

=== Writing ===
Kinberg said the main focus of this film was the future of the X-Men film series. With the use of cast members from the original trilogy and from First Class, they needed to decide the sequels' destination. In preparation for the film, Kinberg studied films about time travel, including Back to the Future (1985), The Terminator (1984) and Terminator 2: Judgment Day (1991). Singer originated a philosophy and a set of rules for time travel in the film so the story would be as plausible as possible.

"Days of Future Past" is a storyline in the Marvel Comics comic book The Uncanny X-Men issues #141–142, published in 1981. It deals with a dystopian future in which mutants are incarcerated in internment camps. An adult Kate Pryde transfers her mind into her younger self, the present-day Kitty Pryde, who brings the X-Men to prevent a fatal moment in history that triggers anti-mutant hysteria. This storyline was the basis for the film.

According to Kinberg, as they were writing the script, they thought it was more sensible for Wolverine to travel between time periods instead of Kitty Pryde, because of his ageless look and ability to heal rapidly. He further stated of making Wolverine the time traveler, "We made the decision for a lot of reasons ... he's the protagonist of the franchise, and probably the most beloved character to a mass audience". Kinberg and Vaughn considered Bishop and Cable candidates for the role of time traveler. Kinberg said Rachel Summers was in the first draft of the script; she sent Wolverine back to 1973. The character was later replaced with Kitty Pryde, to whom Kinberg gave a secondary power of sending people's consciousnesses into the past. Angel Salvadore, Juggernaut, Jubilee, Nightcrawler and Psylocke were also considered for the film.

Singer was asked how the film integrates the themes of the earlier X-Men films; he said, "It establishes that some villain characters may have been right with their fears. It confronts the notions of hope and second chances. Its characters that are lost trying to find themselves. In X-Men 1 and 2, the characters had come into their own and knew who they were. In this one, they're all lost and they're trying to keep it together".

=== Pre-production ===
In November 2011, Simon Kinberg—co-writer of X-Men: The Last Stand and co-producer of X-Men: First Class—was hired to write the film's screenplay. In May 2012, 20th Century Fox announced the film would be released on July 18, 2014. The release was later moved forward to May 23, 2014. In August 2012, the title for the film was confirmed to be X-Men: Days of Future Past. The film is inspired by Chris Claremont and John Byrne's X-Men comic book storyline, "Days of Future Past", which introduced the idea of an alternate future for mutants that grew from the Brotherhood of Evil Mutants' killing of Senator Robert Kelly, leading to a future in which mutants are hunted by Sentinels.

In October 2012, Vaughn left the role of director to focus on Mark Millar's Kingsman: The Secret Service (2014). He originally wanted a different First Class sequel helmed by another director with a young Wolverine possibly played by Tom Hardy, before returning to direct Days of Future Past (set in the 1980s) himself. Singer was later announced as the film's director; it was his third directorial role in the X-Men film series. In preparation for the film, Singer approached James Cameron to discuss time travel, string theory and multiverses. In the same month, Richard Stammers was approached to be the visual effects supervisor, as Singer liked his work in the 2012 film Prometheus.

Singer brought back most of the crew he had in X-Men (2000) and X2 (2003). In December 2012, two long-absent designers were hired: production designer John Myhre, who had only done X-Men, and costume designer Louise Mingenbach—who also did X2 and X-Men Origins: Wolverine. In February 2013, John Ottman—who aside from X-Men, collaborated on all of Singer's works since The Usual Suspects (1995)—was confirmed to work on the music and the editing of the film.

=== Casting ===
I decided that the next time I got myself involved in a movie that had a huge amount of attention already that I would use Twitter. As a way of connecting with fans, principally. And also as a way of clearing up misunderstandings so that people know. You know, they may hear that an actor is cast or hear somebody is going to be in it, but until I say it's so, that's the confirmation.

— Bryan Singer, explaining the Twitter presence of the film

Singer used the online social networking service Twitter to announce casting of the film. In November 2012, he announced that James McAvoy, Michael Fassbender, Jennifer Lawrence and Nicholas Hoult would reprise their roles from X-Men: First Class. Later the same month, he announced that Patrick Stewart and Ian McKellen would reprise their respective roles as the older versions of the characters played by McAvoy and Fassbender. In December, Singer announced that Hugh Jackman would reprise his role as Wolverine.

In January 2013, Singer announced that Anna Paquin, Shawn Ashmore, and Elliot Page would reprise their roles of Rogue, Iceman, and Kitty Pryde. In February, Singer announced that Peter Dinklage would star in the film as the main antagonist. In March, Singer announced that French actor Omar Sy had joined the cast. Halle Berry said in an interview that she would reprise her role as Storm, which was followed by an announcement from Singer that Berry would be in the film. Singer tweeted a picture of the cast, which confirmed that Daniel Cudmore would return as Colossus and that Fan Bingbing and Booboo Stewart had joined the cast.

In April, Singer announced that American singer and songwriter Lady Gaga had joined the cast as Dazzler, but it was later revealed as an April Fools' Day prank. Singer retweeted a photograph of himself, Adan Canto, and confirmed cast members Patrick Stewart, McKellen, and Ashmore, which was followed by a confirmation from Canto that he had joined the cast. In May, Singer announced that Evan Peters had been cast as Quicksilver. In June, Australian actor Josh Helman was cast in a role. In July, Singer tweeted a picture of actor Lucas Till on the set of the film, which confirmed that he was returning as Havok. In January 2014, Evan Jonigkeit had been cast as the younger version of Toad.

Stan Lee, co-creator of the X-Men, was scheduled to shoot a cameo appearance in late August 2013 at Montreal, Canada, but ultimately chose to attend the Fan Expo in Toronto instead.

=== Filming ===
X-Men: Days of Future Past had a production budget of $205 million. Principal photography began on April 15, 2013, at Mel's Cité du Cinema in Montreal, Canada, and ended on August 17, 2013. Filming had to begin in April 2013 to accommodate the cast's individual schedules. Olympic Stadium, Montreal City Hall, and McGill University were also used as filming locations. An aerial plate unit was sent to film in Washington, D.C. Additional filming took place in Montreal in November 2013 and February 2014. According to the Calgary Herald, the film is the second most expensive produced by 20th Century Fox after Avatar (2009). Comic book writer Chris Claremont said in an interview that he was consulted for the film.

X-Men: Days of Future Past is the first X-Men film to be filmed in native 3D; it was shot using Arri Alexa-M cameras with Leica Prime lenses and Fujinon Zoom lenses, along with 3ality Technica TS-35 camera rigs and Stereo Image Processor (SIP) technology systems. Director of photography Newton Thomas Sigel was asked about using Arri Alexa-M cameras; he said, "For Bryan and myself, the Alexa has been almost the gateway to getting the look we like in film". Sigel added that the Arri Alexa-M camera's small size was a big advantage to the film's main unit, which carried three 3D rigs. The film also used the Alexa XTs for the production's 2D work.

Production designer John Myhre said his work load was "six months squeeze[d] down in to 3-4 months", given the sets were massive but he did not have the usual time to design and build before principal photography began. The lue underground hallways and Cerebro sets were faithful recreations of the sets seen in the first X-Men, albeit ransacked and damaged to imply the government had raided the mansion. The sets had many hidden "Xs", including the staircase of the X-Mansion. Myrhe said he wanted to embrace the 1970s setting in the same way First Class embraced its 1960s setting, and costume designer Louise Mingenbach also drew heavily from 1970s styles for the clothing seen in the 1973 scenes. Hoult wore corduroys, Jackman a wooden-paneled buckle and a peacock-print shirt, and McAvoy wore a brown leather jacket. Peters wore 1981-inspired clothing; this was Mingenbach's way of showing Quicksilver's irreverence for the exact time and place. In one scene, Mingenbach gave Fassbender as the younger Erik Lehnsherr a fedora as a nod to the one the character wore in the first X-Men film. For the future period of the film, Mingenbach wanted a darker, slightly futuristic and tactical look for the characters. This included changing the suit Patrick Stewart had previously worn as Xavier to battle fatigues.

The Sentinels had two separate versions, to depict how the earlier prototypes built by Trask in the 1970s evolved into the adaptable killing machines of the dystopian future. Singer described the 1973 version as "a little fun and stylish but also a little retro", with a key element being that they are made of plastic to be unaffected by Magneto's powers. Myhre used styles from molded plastics from the 1970s to design Sentinels from that period, and cited inspiration from both the cars of the decade and "those wonderful TV sets that were round with smoked glass panels". The overall style was bulky to fit "the traditional idea of a robot looks like", and drew the most from the comics version, such as the purple color and a humanoid shape, while trying to stand out on its own with its retro design. The robots' ability to fly was compared to a Harrier jump jet, as the Sentinels had vertical takeoff and could glide. Life-sized Sentinels were built by Legacy Effects to be featured on the set, and had articulated joints to be fully poseable. The sound effects averted metallic noises, while adding woof effects on the Sentinels' footsteps to display its weight on the ground.

On the other hand, the future Sentinels would resemble "giant versions of Mystique" to show how their technological development was based on studying the shapeshifting mutant's DNA. Thus their design is sleek and feminine, with a body covered in mechanical scales that move during the process of adapting to a mutant's attack, while also featuring angular and dark faces to enhance the intimidation. The future robots would feature what Singer described as "biomechanical technology to transform to adapt to other mutants, to take on their physicality and some of their powers to use against mutantkind", which the director imagined to be fueled by nanotechnology and "the ability to really change things almost at a molecular level". The Sentinels' heads would also open up as an extra weapon, and for straighter combat the robots could create blades and spikes out of their limbs. The crackling sound of the robots' scales was made by rubbing riveted belts on shale rocks.

For the future setting of the film, a set featuring a hillside monastery was built. Myhre was inspired by Chinese temples built on the sides of cliffs. The future set also featured a mixture of architectural styles from China, India, and Indonesia. Part of the set was a large wall inspired by the Great Wall of China.

=== Visual effects ===
X-Men: Days of Future Past had 1,311 visual effects shots produced by twelve studios. Richard Stammer served as the overall effects supervisor based on his work for Prometheus (2012). The leading company was Moving Picture Company, who created the future Sentinels and worked on the sequences involving the X-Jet and Cerebro's red virtual world. The Sentinels' scaled bodies were created by adapting a tool originally developed to create hair and fur, which would later evolve into creating a proxy representation of each individual scale as a "follicle". Another major contributor was Digital Domain, with effects from the 1973 portion that encompassed nearly a third of the work. These included the Sentinels, Mystique's transformations and eyes, and various digital environments. Digital augmentation turned a remote airstrip into a Vietnam prisoner camp and added Paris' famed mansard rooftops to the Montreal locations. The environment work based on Washington, D.C. required the team to study period references of the National Mall and White House, and photograph almost all of RFK Stadium to create a detailed digital replica. Rising Sun Pictures created a sequence considered by many reviewers the centerpiece of the film's effects, where Quicksilver uses his super speed in the Pentagon kitchen. Depicting how, to a speedster, actions in real time come down to a virtual standstill, objects float around in slow-motion. After doing a LIDAR scan of the kitchen set, the digital recreation added many computer-generated props—cooking gear, cutlery, vegetables and water released by a fire sprinkler system—rendered in near microscopic detail regarding placement and lighting, particularly because the footage had to work in 3D. To simulate Quicksilver running on the walls, Evan Peters and a stunt double were filmed in both the set being suspended by a harness and on a treadmill that stood in front of a chroma key green screen. Only Peters' legs were digitally replaced. Despite the sequence only having 29 effects shots, it required nearly seven months of work from RSP's team of 70 artists.

Rhythm and Hues Studios worked on Beast's transformations, the creation of Xavier's plane, and speed effects for Quicksilver. They also worked with Digital Domain on the sequence featuring the inside of the 1973 Sentinel. Mokko Studio worked on Mystique's eyes and costume fixes. Cinesite worked on the future New York City in the opening prologue along with clean-ups, wire removals, and production fixes. Fuel VFX worked on holographic effects and Havok's mutant powers. Vision Globale worked on visual effects relating to a dream and flashback sequence. Hydraulx, Lola and Method Studios handled a number of compositions and production fixes. The Third Floor worked on extensive story-boarding and visualisation.

== Music ==
Director Bryan Singer's regular collaborator John Ottman worked on the score of the film, in addition to being its editor, thereby becoming the first composer to score more than one film in the X-Men film series, having previously scored X2 (2003). He reused some of his themes from X2, including the title theme, which is a first for an X-Men film. He also used modern instrumentation and synth elements for the score, upon Singer's request, as it could be compared to other contemporary superhero scores.

The soundtrack was digitally released by Sony Classical Records on May 26, 2014, followed by a physical release on June 30, 2014. An expanded version of the soundtrack, including music exclusive to The Rogue Cut, was released on July 10, 2015.

== Release ==
The world premiere of X-Men: Days of Future Past occurred at the Jacob K. Javits Convention Center in New York City on May 10, 2014. It was released in international markets in 2D and 3D theaters on May 21, 2014, and in the United States on May 23, 2014. Premiere events were also held in London, Beijing, Moscow, Singapore, São Paulo, Melbourne, and Tokyo.

=== Marketing ===
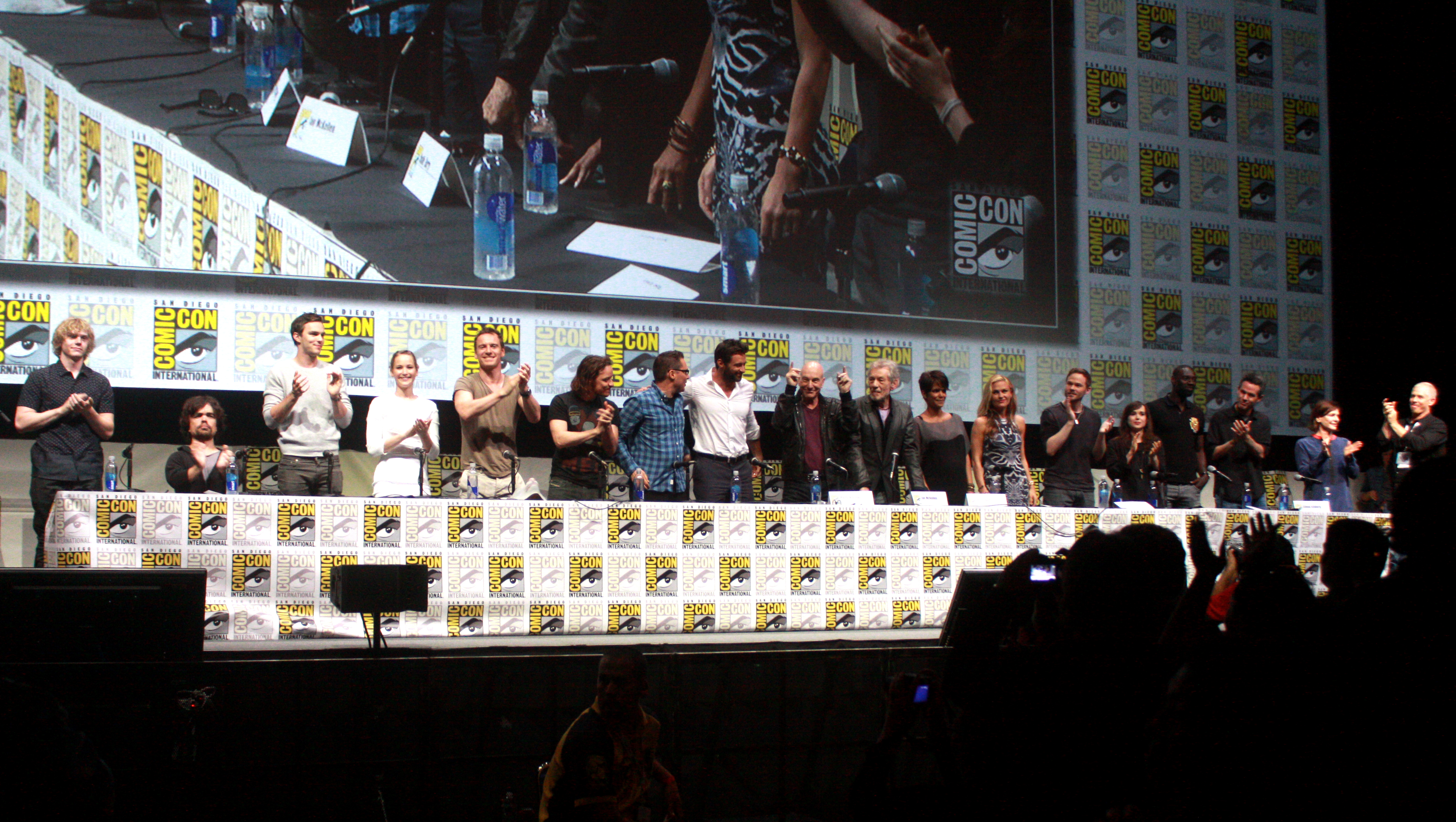
The cast of X-Men: Days of Future Past at the 2013 San Diego Comic-Con

In June 2013, 20th Century Fox presented a set tour video of X-Men: Days of Future Past at the CineEurope conference in Barcelona; director Bryan Singer acted as the tour guide. The set tour video was included with the home video release of the 2013 film The Wolverine. In July 2013, Singer, writer Simon Kinberg, producers Lauren Shuler Donner and Hutch Parker, together with cast members Jennifer Lawrence, Evan Peters, Omar Sy, Elliot Page, Shawn Ashmore, Anna Paquin, Halle Berry, Ian McKellen, Patrick Stewart, Hugh Jackman, James McAvoy, Michael Fassbender, Nicholas Hoult, and Peter Dinklage presented at the 2013 San Diego Comic-Con. Footage from the film was screened. In August 2013, Singer presented footage from the film at the Fantasia International Film Festival. In March 2014, 20th Century Fox presented footage from the film at CinemaCon. In April 2014, Page presented footage from the film at the 2014 MTV Movie Awards. Kinberg and Dinklage attended WonderCon to discuss the film. Singer withdrew from the publicity rounds for the film because of a lawsuit alleging sexual abuse filed against him. In July 2014, 20th Century Fox and Oculus Rift presented a "virtual reality experience" at the 2014 San Diego Comic-Con. Attendees were given a chance to sit in a replica of Professor X's wheelchair and virtually hunt Mystique in the San Diego Convention Center.

In July 2013, a mid-credits scene teasing X-Men: Days of Future Past was attached to the theatrical release of The Wolverine. The scene, set two years after the events of The Wolverine, depicts Wolverine going through an airport security checkpoint while a commercial for Trask Industries plays in the background. Suddenly, Wolverine notices that all the metal objects around him start to shake and levitate. He turns around to see Magneto, who says he needs Wolverine's help to combat a threat to all mutants. When Wolverine asks Magneto why he should trust him, the people around them freeze as Xavier approaches Wolverine and assures him that Magneto is telling the truth. Adam Pockross of Yahoo! Movies described the mid-credits scene as the coolest part of The Wolverine and wrote, "Boom! And that's how you tease the next film: by giving us so much to chew on, yet so few answers".

The first official trailer for X-Men: Days of Future Past was released in October 2013. Jason Callina of New Jersey's Herald News gave the trailer a positive response, saying, "it is fantastic to see characters that I grew up with in the flesh ... we still have to wait till the end of May to see if Fox succeeded, but for now they have my interest". Ben Child of The Guardian criticized the trailer for the number of characters that would appear in the film. Child wrote, "overloading the movie with superheroes might please fans of the comic books, but the rest of us will be chewing on our own spleens when the umpteenth brightly coloured dude turns up to spout one line of dialogue, then drop off the map".

A mid-credits scene teasing X-Men: Days of Future Past was attached to the theatrical release of The Amazing Spider-Man 2 in April 2014. In the scene, which is set during the Vietnam War, Mystique tries to infiltrate a military camp led by William Stryker to recruit fellow mutants Havok, Ink, and Toad. The Amazing Spider-Man 2 director Marc Webb had an existing contract with Fox Searchlight Pictures to direct another film following 500 Days of Summer (2009). After The Amazing Spider-Man, Webb's negotiations with Sony Pictures Entertainment stalled because of his commitment to Fox. Fox eventually agreed to allow Webb to direct the sequel of The Amazing Spider-Man, and in exchange, Sony promoted the X-Men film without charge. In addition, three viral websites were launched before the release of the film—Trask-Industries.com in July 2013, TheBentBullet.com in November 2013 and 25Moments.com in April 2014. To further promote the film, Jackman made a guest appearance on the April 28, 2014, episode of WWE Raw. The segment received mixed reactions.

=== Bryan Singer controversy ===
In April 2014, just one month before the film's release date, director Bryan Singer was accused in a civil lawsuit of sexual assault of a minor. According to the suit filed by attorney Jeff Herman, Singer was alleged to have drugged and raped actor and model Michael Egan in Hawaii after meeting him at parties hosted by convicted sex offender Marc Collins-Rector in the late 1990s. Singer's attorney called the allegations "completely fabricated" and said Singer planned to countersue. Singer denied the allegations in a statement, calling them "outrageous, vicious, and completely false." As a result, Singer withdrew from the publicity rounds for the film because of the sexual abuse lawsuit filed against him. On May 22, 2014, just a day before the film's release date, Singer's attorney presented evidence to Federal District Judge Susan Oki Mollway stating that neither Singer nor Egan were in Hawaii at the time. In early August 2014, Egan sought to withdraw his lawsuit via a Request for Court Order of Dismissal, and asked that it be granted "without prejudice or an award of costs or fees, in the interest of justice."

In May 2014, another lawsuit was filed by Herman on behalf of an anonymous British man. Both Singer and producer Gary Goddard (who was also named separately in the first case) were accused of sexually assaulting "John Doe No. 117." According to the lawsuit, Goddard and Singer met the man for sex when he was a minor and engaged in acts of "gender violence" against him while in London for the premiere of Superman Returns. The charge against Singer in this case was dismissed, at the accuser's request, in July 2014.

Singer's controversies were later cited in the 2014 documentary film on child sexual abuse in Hollywood, An Open Secret, but details of Egan's allegations were omitted after Egan withdrew his lawsuit during the film's production. Author Bret Easton Ellis alleged that two of his former partners had attended underage sex parties hosted by Singer and fellow director Roland Emmerich.

=== Promotional partners ===
In July 2013, CKE Restaurants and 20th Century Fox announced a promotional partnership for the theatrical release of X-Men: Days of Future Past. The promotion included advertising, in-restaurant merchandising, collectors' cups, and a film-themed burger, the Western "X-Tra" Bacon Thickburger, sold at CKE Restaurants outlets Hardee's and Carl's Jr. Zachary Eller, senior vice president of marketing partnerships & promotions at 20th Century Fox, said, "their fun and irreverent advertising campaigns are a great fit with our film and we couldn't be more thrilled to join together to feed mutants everywhere!"

Mountain Dew partnered with the film to promote it globally; the promotion included prizes, a television commercial, online exclusives, in-store and in-theater advertisements, and commemorative packaging featuring X-Men characters from future and past. Anna Roca, senior vice president of international promotions at 20th Century Fox, stated, "The adventurous, energetic attitude of [Mountain Dew's] fan base mirrors the franchise's own—and their international reach helps bring our beloved mutants to more corners of the world than ever before".

In March 2014, British train operator Virgin Trains West Coast revinyled a Class 390 Pendolino train, featuring the film characters on the carriages. It was launched at London Euston station with Hugh Jackman and James McAvoy attending the launch. Three months later, Wolverhampton station changed its name to "Wolverine station" for one day.

Kia Motors collaborated with 20th Century Fox to promote the home media release of the film with a Wolverine-themed Sorento. The SUV made its debut at the 2015 Australian Open, with a series of videos featuring Rafael Nadal teaming up with the X-Men to save the tennis event from the Sentinels.

=== Home media ===
In June 2014, cable network FX acquired the television rights to X-Men: Days of Future Past. The film was released by 20th Century Fox Home Entertainment on digital download on September 23, 2014, and on DVD, Blu-ray and Blu-ray 3D on October 14, 2014. In the United Kingdom, it was released on November 10, 2014. Three versions were released; a Deluxe Edition containing the Blu-ray 3D, Blu-ray and digital download; a Blu-ray and digital download combo pack; and a single-disc DVD.

=== The Rogue Cut ===
20th Century Fox Home Entertainment released an alternate version of the film, titled The Rogue Cut, on July 14, 2015. It added 17 minutes of previously unused footage, including a subplot involving Anna Paquin's character Rogue, whose role was reduced to a brief cameo in the theatrical release. The Rogue Cut was also screened at the 2015 San Diego Comic-Con.

In the Rogue Cut, Rogue's role is more consequential, and the narrative is more complex: when Kitty Pryde (revealed to be dating Iceman in this version of events) is accidentally wounded after Wolverine's consciousness experiences a phase between past and future from seeing Stryker in 1973, Iceman proposes breaking into the heavily guarded remains of Cerebro at the former X-Mansion, the one place where Xavier's mind cannot reach others from the outside, to rescue Rogue, who is being held captive there. Xavier, Magneto, and Iceman succeed in rescuing Rogue, but at the cost of Iceman's life (rather than Iceman being killed by the Sentinels during the final confrontation at the temple along with the other 2023 mutants). Rogue uses her power to take over for Kitty in regards to keeping Wolverine's mind in 1973, for the remaining time until the moment history is changed, with a suggestion that Wolverine is aware of the switch as he appears to feel Rogue's presence. Instead of simply appearing, the Sentinels find the X-Men through a tracking device inside a Sentinel's hand that was severed from the X-Jet during their escape. In another major scene, Mystique stops at the X-Mansion the night before the Sentinel-unveiling ceremony, nearly rekindles her previous romance with Beast, and destroys Cerebro the following morning to prevent Xavier from finding her. A new mid-credits scene shows Bolivar Trask imprisoned at Magneto's former prison cell beneath the Pentagon for selling military secrets to foreign countries.

== Reception ==
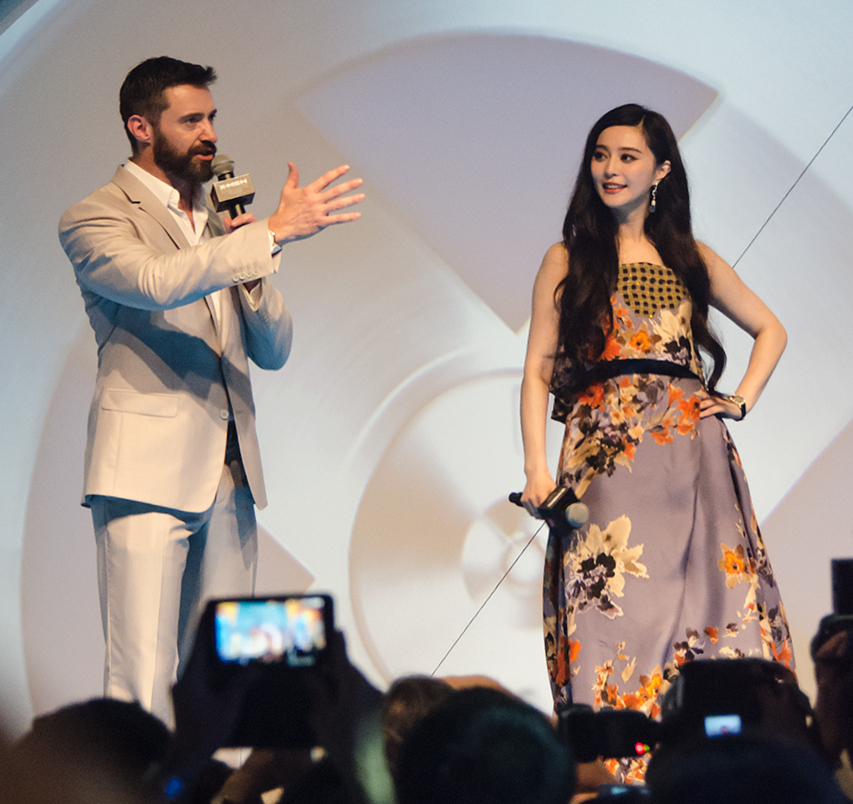
Hugh Jackman and Fan Bingbing at the film's premiere in Singapore

=== Box office ===
Worldwide, X-Men: Days of Future Past earned $262.8 million during its opening weekend, the highest worldwide opening weekend for an X-Men film. The film grossed $233.9 million in the US and Canada, and $512.1 million in other markets, for a worldwide gross of $747.9 million, making it the highest-grossing entry in the X-Men film series before being surpassed by Deadpool two years later. Deadline Hollywood calculated the net profit of the film to be $77.3 million, accounting for production budgets, P&A, talent participations, and other costs, with box office grosses, and ancillary revenues from home media, placing it sixteenth on their list of 2014's "Most Valuable Blockbusters".

In the United States and Canada, the film earned $8.1 million from Thursday night showings, which was the highest late-night opening for an X-Men film. It was also the highest-grossing film during its opening weekend, earning $90.8 million, which made it the second-highest opening weekend of the series, at the time, behind X-Men: The Last Stand ($102.7 million). The film also had the third-highest opening weekend for a 20th Century Fox film, after the latter film and Star Wars: Episode III – Revenge of the Sith ($108.4 million). During the four-day Memorial Day weekend, it earned $110.6 million. The audience was 56% male and 59% were older than 25.

Elsewhere, the film was the highest-grossing film during its opening weekend, taking $172 million, making it Fox International's highest opening weekend, beating the previous record held by Avatar ($164 million). The film's highest-grossing debuts were in China, Ireland, Malta, South Korea and the United Kingdom. It was also the highest-grossing debut for a 20th Century Fox film in 11 markets, including South Korea, Brazil, the Philippines and India. It became the highest-grossing X-Men film in Argentina, Australia, Austria, Belgium, Brazil, China, Colombia, Croatia, Czech Republic, Denmark, Ecuador, Egypt, Finland, France, Hong Kong, Hungary, India, Ireland, Israel, Italy, Lebanon, Malaysia, Mexico, the Netherlands, New Zealand, Norway, the Philippines, Poland, Singapore, Slovakia, South Korea, Sweden, Thailand, the United Kingdom and Venezuela. (Note: Attributed to multiple references:)

=== Critical response ===
On review aggregator Rotten Tomatoes, X-Men: Days of Future Past holds an approval rating of 90% based on 328 reviews, with an average rating of 7.5/10. The website's critical consensus reads, "X-Men: Days of Future Past combines the best elements of the series to produce a satisfyingly fast-paced outing that ranks among the franchise's finest installments." On Metacritic, the film has a weighted average score of 75 out of 100, based on 44 critics, indicating "generally favorable reviews". Audiences polled by CinemaScore gave the film an average grade of "A" on an A+ to F scale.

Sean O'Connell of CinemaBlend gave the film four and a half stars out of five, and said it was "the greatest, most complete and staggeringly entertaining [X-Men film] to date". Empire gave it four out of five stars and called it, "The best X-Men film since the second one". Steve Rose of The Guardian rated the film three stars out of five; he said, "Non-devotees might struggle, but director Bryan Singer whips up the action towards a symphonic climax". David Rooney of The Hollywood Reporter said, "While it's more dramatically diffuse than the reboot and lacks a definitive villain, the new film is shot through with a stirring reverence for the Marvel Comics characters and their universe". Justin Chang of Variety said, "If the characters' quandaries at times feel overly circumscribed, they're also advanced with a bracing emotional directness, devoid of either cynicism or sentimentalism, that touches genuine chords of feeling over the course of the film's fleet 130-minute [sic] running time". In 2016, James Charisma of Playboy ranked the film #8 on a list of "15 Sequels That Are Way Better Than The Originals".

In contrast, Robbie Collin of The Daily Telegraph rated the film two stars out of five and called the plot "a curate's egg, thoroughly scrambled". He concluded, "The film squanders both of its casts, reeling from one fumbled set-piece to the next. It seems to have been constructed in a stupor, and you watch in a daze of future past". Simon Abrams, writing for RogerEbert.com, gave the film two-and-a-half stars out of four, calling it a "visually driven and paint-by-numbers plot". Abrams was critical of the undeveloped subplots that built up because the film's pacing left little time to develop each element of the story set in the 1970s.

Following criticism of X-Men: The Last Stand for killing off major characters such as Professor Charles Xavier, Cyclops, and Jean Grey, X-Men: Days of Future Past has subsequently been viewed by some critics as a revision of those controversial plot elements in X-Men: The Last Stand.

=== Accolades ===
Accolades received by X-Men: Days of Future Past
Award	Date of ceremony	Category	Recipient(s)	Result	Ref.
3D Creative Arts Awards	January 28, 2015	Best Feature Film – Live Action	X-Men: Days of Future Past	Nominated	
3D Creative Arts Awards	January 28, 2015	Best Scene or Sequence in a Feature Film	X-Men: Days of Future Past	Won	
AACTA Awards	January 29, 2015	Best Visual Effects	Tim Crosbie and Adam Paschke	Nominated	
Academy Awards	February 22, 2015	Best Visual Effects	Richard Stammers, Lou Pecora, Tim Crosbie, and Cameron Waldbauer	Nominated	
British Academy Film Awards	February 8, 2015	Best Special Visual Effects	Richard Stammers, Anders Langlands, Tim Crosbie, and Cameron Waldbauer	Nominated	
Empire Awards	March 29, 2015	Best Sci-Fi/Fantasy	X-Men: Days of Future Past	Won	
Golden Trailer Awards	May 30, 2014	Best Summer 2014 Blockbuster Trailer	"Remember" (Mob Scene)	Nominated	
Golden Trailer Awards	May 6, 2015	Best Graphics in a TV Spot	"Dazzling Review" (TRANSIT)	Nominated	
MTV Movie Awards	April 12, 2015	Best Villain	Peter Dinklage	Nominated	
Nickelodeon Kids' Choice Awards	March 28, 2015	Favorite Female Action Star	Halle Berry	Nominated	
Nickelodeon Kids' Choice Awards	March 28, 2015	Favorite Female Action Star	Elliot Page	Nominated	
Nickelodeon Kids' Choice Awards	March 28, 2015	Favorite Male Action Star	Hugh Jackman	Nominated	
Nickelodeon Kids' Choice Awards	March 28, 2015	Favorite Movie Actor	Hugh Jackman	Nominated	
People's Choice Awards	January 7, 2015	Favorite Action Movie	X-Men: Days of Future Past	Nominated	
People's Choice Awards	January 7, 2015	Favorite Movie	X-Men: Days of Future Past	Nominated	
Saturn Awards	June 25, 2015	Best Comic-to-Film Motion Picture	X-Men: Days of Future Past	Nominated	
Saturn Awards	June 25, 2015	Best Costume	Louise Mingenbach	Nominated	
Saturn Awards	June 25, 2015	Best Director	Bryan Singer	Nominated	
Saturn Awards	June 25, 2015	Best Editing	John Ottman	Nominated	
Saturn Awards	June 25, 2015	Best Make-up	Adrien Morot and Norma Hill-Patton	Nominated	
Saturn Awards	June 22, 2016	Best DVD/BD Special Edition	X-Men: Days of Future Past (The Rogue Cut)	Won	
Screen Actors Guild Awards	January 25, 2015	Outstanding Performance by a Stunt Ensemble in a Motion Picture	X-Men: Days of Future Past	Nominated	
St. Louis Film Critics Association Awards	December 15, 2014	Best Scene	"Quicksilver Escape from the Pentagon"	Won	
Teen Choice Awards	August 10, 2014	Choice Movie Actress: Sci-Fi/Fantasy	Halle Berry	Nominated	
Teen Choice Awards	August 10, 2014	Choice Movie Actress: Sci-Fi/Fantasy	Jennifer Lawrence	Won	
Teen Choice Awards	August 10, 2014	Choice Movie: Scene Stealer	Nicholas Hoult	Nominated	
Teen Choice Awards	August 10, 2014	Choice Movie: Scene Stealer	Elliot Page	Nominated	
Teen Choice Awards	August 10, 2014	Choice Movie: Sci-Fi/Fantasy	X-Men: Days of Future Past	Nominated	
Teen Choice Awards	August 10, 2014	Choice Movie: Villain	Michael Fassbender	Nominated	
Visual Effects Society Awards	February 4, 2015	Outstanding Visual Effects in a Visual Effects Driven Photoreal/Live Action Feature Motion Picture	Richard Stammers, Blondel Aidoo, Lou Pecora, Anders Landlangs, and Cameron Waldbauer	Nominated	
Visual Effects Society Awards	February 4, 2015	Outstanding Virtual Cinematography in a Photoreal/Live Action Feature Motion Picture	Austin Bonang, Casey Schatz, Dennis Jones, and Newton Thomas Sigel for the "Kitchen Scene"	Won	
Visual Effects Society Awards	February 4, 2015	Outstanding Effects Simulations in a Photoreal/Live Action Feature Motion Picture	Adam Paschke, Premamurti Paetsch, Sam Hancock, and Timmy Lundin for "Quicksilver Pentagon Kitchen"	Won	
Young Hollywood Awards	July 28, 2014	Best Cast Chemistry – Film	X-Men: Days of Future Past	Nominated	
Young Hollywood Awards	July 28, 2014	Fan Favorite Actor – Female	Jennifer Lawrence	Nominated	
Young Hollywood Awards	July 28, 2014	Favorite Flick	X-Men: Days of Future Past	Nominated	
Young Hollywood Awards	July 28, 2014	Super Superhero	Nicholas Hoult	Nominated	

== Sequels ==
A sequel, X-Men: Apocalypse, was released on May 27, 2016. A final sequel, Dark Phoenix, was released on June 7, 2019.

== See also ==
- 2014 in film
- List of American films of 2014
- List of British films of 2014
- List of films featuring drones
- List of films featuring time loops
- List of highest-grossing films
