= I Can't Let Go (Smash song) =

Single from the American TV series, Smash

Single by Smash cast feat. Jennifer Hudson
- Released: February 26, 2013
- Recorded: 2013
- Genre: Pop
- Length: 3:39 (Single Version)
- Label: Columbia
- Composer(s): Marc Shaiman
- Lyricist(s): Marc Shaiman; Scott Wittman

Smash cast singles chronology
""Don't Forget Me""	"I Can't Let Go"	""Heart Shaped Wreckage""

"I Can't Let Go" is an original song introduced in the fourth episode of the second season of the musical TV series Smash, entitled "The Song". It was written by Marc Shaiman and Scott Wittman. Within the show's universe, it was written by songwriting team Jimmy Collins (Jeremy Jordan) and Kyle Bishop (Andy Mientus) for their musical Hit List.

In the episode, Broadway star Veronica Moore (Jennifer Hudson) is rehearsing for a one night only concert with the help of Tom Levitt (Christian Borle) and Derek Wills (Jack Davenport) and struggling to figure out the direction that it should take. Karen Cartwright (Katharine McPhee) learns that they are looking for some songs for the show and call Jimmy and Kyle to see if they have a song that can be used and help them get a foot in the door. They come over and try to pitch some of their songs to Tom, who tells them their songs are good, but none of them are right for Veronica's style. Kyle suggests that they'll write a song, even though they only have a few hours to do so. Kyle and Jimmy struggle over the next few hours to come up with a song that's right for Veronica and the show. They eventually finish, but Derek refuses to hear it because Veronica and her mother aren't comfortable with Derek's more sexed-up direction and want to do the songs she usually does. Jimmy storms off and gets high, but Karen convinces him to come back and show that he's got thick enough skin to handle rejection. Meanwhile, Tom has looked at the song and determines that it is really good, and gives it to Derek and convinces him to use it. At the end of the concert, Veronica introduces the song to the audience and sings it, with Jimmy and Kyle watching from backstage and finding out for the first time that their song really is being used. Veronica's performance gets a standing ovation, and she motions to Jimmy and Kyle to come out on stage and she introduces them to the audience (which is also being filmed by the Bravo network), introducing them and their music to a wider audience than they've ever had before.

The song is currently available as a single and has sold 11,000 digital downloads as of March 6, 2013.

On Sunday, February 22, 2015, Hudson performed a special version of the song (with some lyrics rewritten for the occasion) live as part of the memorial segment of the 87th Academy Awards show aired on the ABC television network.
