= Richard Stammers =

- Occupation: Visual effects artist
- Years active: 1996–present

Richard Stammers is a British visual effects artist.

He was nominated for the Best Visual Effects at the 85th Academy Awards for his work on the film Prometheus and at the 87th Academy Awards for his work on the film X-Men: Days of Future Past. He received his third nomination at the 88th Academy Awards for the film The Martian.

== Selected filmography ==
- Harry Potter and the Goblet of Fire (2005)
- The Chronicles of Narnia: Prince Caspian (2008)
- Robin Hood (2010)
- Prometheus (2012)
- X-Men: Days of Future Past (2014)
- The Martian (2015)
