= List of accolades received by Star Trek (film) =

Star Trek awards and nominations
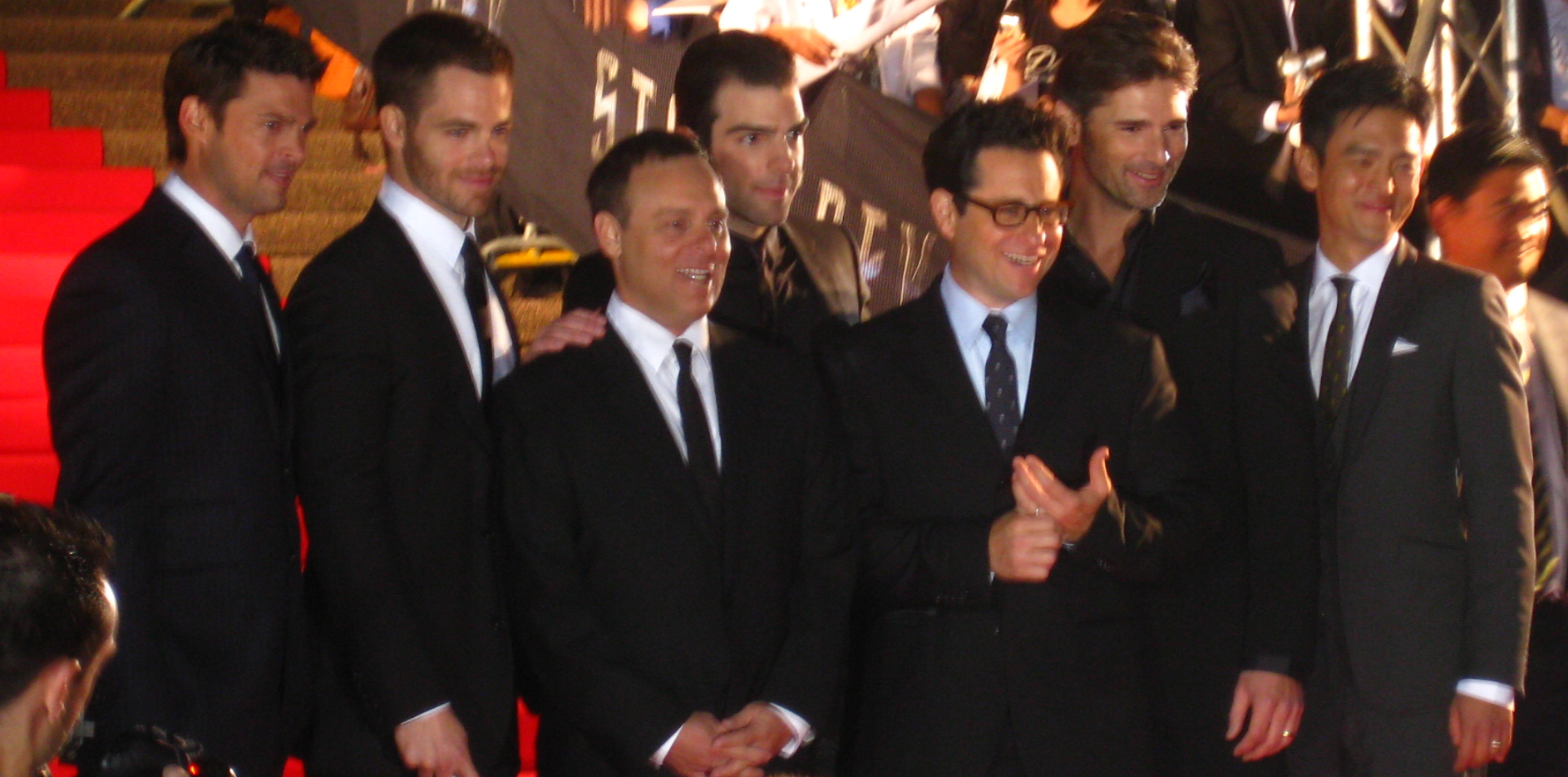
- From left to right: Karl Urban, Chris Pine, Bryan Burk, Zachary Quinto, J. J. Abrams, Eric Bana, and John Cho at the world premiere in Sydney, Australia.
Awards and nominations
Award	Wins	Nominations
Academy Awards	1	4
ADG Excellence in Production Design Award	0	1
ALMA Award	0	3
American Cinema Editors Eddie Awards	0	1
ASCAP Film and Television Music Awards	1	1
Artios Awards	1	1
Austin Film Critics Association Awards	0	1
Boston Society of Film Critics Awards	1	1
British Academy Film Awards	0	2
California on Location Awards	1	3
Cinema Audio Society Awards	0	1
Costume Designers Guild Awards	0	1
Critics' Choice Movie Award	0	5
Detroit Film Critics Society Awards	0	2
Empire Awards	1	3
Golden Reel Award	0	3
Golden Trailer Awards	4	5
Grammy Awards	0	1
Hollywood Film Festival Awards	1	1
Hollywood Post Alliance Awards	0	2
Hugo Awards	0	1
IFMCA Awards	1	3
MTV Movie Awards	0	2
National Board of Review Awards	1	1
Online Film Critics Society Awards	1	1
People's Choice Awards	0	4
Producers Guild of America Awards	0	1
Satellite Awards	1	1
Saturn Awards	2	7
Scream Award	6	17
Screen Actors Guild Awards	1	1
SFX Awards	1	3
St. Louis Gateway Film Critics Association Awards	0	1
Taurus World Stunt Awards	0	5
Teen Choice Awards	0	6
Visual Effects Society Awards	0	2
Washington D.C. Area Film Critics Association Awards	0	2
World Soundtrack Awards	0	1
Writers Guild of America Awards	0	1

Totals (Note: Certain award groups do not simply award one winner. They acknowledge several different recipients, have runners-up, and have third place. Since this is a specific recognition and is different from losing an award, runner-up mentions are considered wins in this award tally. For simplification and to avoid errors, each award in this list has been presumed to have had a prior nomination.)
- Wins: 29
- Nominations: 107

Star Trek is a 2009 American science fiction film produced by Spyglass Entertainment and Bad Robot, and was distributed by Paramount Pictures. It was written by Roberto Orci and Alex Kurtzman; the producers of the film were Damon Lindelof and J. J. Abrams, the latter of which also directed the film. It is the eleventh film in the Star Trek film franchise and is also a reboot that features the main characters of the original Star Trek television series, portrayed by a new cast. The film follows James T. Kirk (Chris Pine) and Spock (Zachary Quinto) aboard the USS Enterprise as they combat a Romulan from the future who threatens the United Federation of Planets as he seeks his revenge.

Following an unexpected public screening on April 6, 2009, at the Alamo Drafthouse theater in Austin, Texas, the world premiere took place at the Sydney Opera House in Sydney, Australia on April 7, 2009. Official screenings in the United States started at 7 pm on May 7, 2009, grossing $4 million on its opening day and more than $79 million domestically by the end of the weekend. Star Trek ended its United States theatrical run on October 1, 2009, with a box office total exceeding $257 million, which placed it as the seventh highest-grossing film for 2009 behind The Hangover. The film took a total worldwide gross of over $385 million on a production budget of $150 million. Rotten Tomatoes, a review aggregator, surveyed 299 reviews and judged 95 percent to be positive.

Star Trek garnered 32 awards out of 110 nominations, with work on the sound and special effects highlighted by a number of award ceremonies they were represented at. Furthermore, the cast – including Pine, Quinto and Zoe Saldaña – were also recognised on an individual basis. The most success received by the film was at the Scream Awards where it took home six awards in a single ceremony out of seventeen nominations. Amongst the nominations received by the film, there were three at the British Academy Film Awards, five at the Critics' Choice Movie Awards, four at the People's Choice Awards, and single nominations at both the Grammy Awards, and the Writers Guild of America Awards. The film was also the first in the Star Trek franchise to win an Academy Award, with Barney Burman, Mindy Hall and Joel Harlow winning for Best Makeup and Hairstyling.

== Awards and nominations ==
Award	Date of ceremony	Category	Recipients	Outcome	Ref.
Academy Awards	March 7, 2010	Best Makeup	Barney Burman, Mindy Hall, Joel Harlow	Won	
Academy Awards	March 7, 2010	Best Sound Editing	Alan Rankin, Mark Stoeckinger	Nominated	
Academy Awards	March 7, 2010	Best Sound Mixing	Anna Behlmer, Peter J. Devlin, Andy Nelson	Nominated	
Academy Awards	March 7, 2010	Best Visual Effects	Burt Dalton, Russell Earl, Roger Guyett, Paul Kavanagh	Nominated	
ADG Excellence in Production Design Award	February 5, 2010	Best Production Design – Fantasy Film	Scott Chambliss	Nominated	
ALMA Award	September 17, 2009	Year in Film – Actor	Clifton Collins, Jr.	Nominated	
ALMA Award	September 17, 2009	Year in Film – Actress	Zoe Saldaña	Nominated	
ALMA Award	September 17, 2009	Year Behind the Scenes	Roberto Orci	Nominated	
American Cinema Editors Eddie Awards	February 14, 2010	Best Edited Feature Film – Dramatic	Maryann Brandon, Mary Jo Markey	Nominated	
ASCAP Film and Television Music Awards	June 24, 2010	Top Box Office Film	Michael Giacchino	Won	
Artios Awards	November 2, 2009	Outstanding Achievement in Casting: Big Budget Feature – Drama	April Webster and Alyssa Weisberg	Won	
Austin Film Critics Association Awards	December 15, 2009	Best Film	Star Trek	Nominated	
Boston Society of Film Critics Awards	December 13, 2009	Best Ensemble Cast (Note: This was a shared award with the ensemble cast from the film Precious: Based on the Novel "Push" by Sapphire.)	Star Trek	Won	
British Academy Film Awards	September 17, 2009	Best Sound	Anna Behlmer, Ben Burtt, Peter J. Devlin, Andy Nelson, Mark Stoeckinger	Nominated	
British Academy Film Awards	September 17, 2009	Best Special Visual Effects	Burt Dalton, Russell Earl, Roger Guyett, Paul Kavanagh	Nominated	
California on Location Awards	October 19, 2008	Location Professional of the Year – Features	Becky Brake	Nominated	
California on Location Awards	October 19, 2008	Assistant Location Manager of the Year – Features	Scott Trimble	Nominated	
California on Location Awards	October 19, 2008	Assistant Location Manager of the Year – Features	Kathy McCurdy	Won	
Cinema Audio Society Awards	February 27, 2010	Outstanding Achievement in Sound Mixing for Motion Pictures	Anna Behlmer, Peter J. Devlin, Paul Massey, Andy Nelson	Nominated	
Costume Designers Guild Awards	January 26, 2010	Excellence in Fantasy Film	Michael Kaplan	Nominated	
Critics' Choice Movie Award	January 15, 2010	Best Sound	Anna Behlmer, Ben Burtt, Peter J. Devlin, David Giammarco, Paul Massey, Andy Nelson, Alan Rankin, Mark Stoeckinger	Nominated	
Critics' Choice Movie Award	January 15, 2010	Best Visual Effects	Burt Dalton, Russell Earl, Roger Guyett, Paul Kavanagh	Nominated	
Critics' Choice Movie Award	January 15, 2010	Best Makeup	Barney Burman, Debra S. Coleman, Mindy Hall, Joel Harlow	Nominated	
Critics' Choice Movie Award	January 15, 2010	Best Cast	Star Trek	Nominated	
Critics' Choice Movie Award	January 15, 2010	Best Action Film	Star Trek	Nominated	
Detroit Film Critics Society Awards	December 11, 2009	Best Ensemble	Star Trek	Nominated	
Detroit Film Critics Society Awards	December 11, 2009	Breakthrough Performance	Chris Pine	Nominated	
Empire Awards	March 28, 2010	Best Film	Star Trek	Nominated	
Empire Awards	March 28, 2010	Best Director	J. J. Abrams	Nominated	
Empire Awards	March 28, 2010	Best Sci-Fi/Fantasy	Star Trek	Won	
Golden Reel Award	February 10, 2010	Best Sound Editing – Music in a Feature Film	Ramiro Belgardt, Stephen M. Davis, Alex Levy	Nominated	
Golden Reel Award	February 10, 2010	Best Sound Editing – Sound Effects and Foley in a Feature Film	David Barbee, Ben Burtt, Charlie Campagna, Harry Cohen, Scott Martin Gershin, Robin Harlan, Sarah Monat, Glenn T. Morgan, Alan Rankin, Geoffrey G. Rubay, Ann Scibelli, Thomas W. Small, Mark Stoeckinger, Tim Walston, Ben Wilkins	Nominated	
Golden Reel Award	February 10, 2010	Best Sound Editing – Dialogue and ADR in a Feature Film	Laura R. Harris, Daniel S. Irwin, Alan Rankin, Mark Stoeckinger, Kerry Dean Williams	Nominated	
Golden Trailer Awards	June 4, 2009	Best in Show	Aspect Ratio, Paramount Pictures	Won	
Golden Trailer Awards	June 4, 2009	Summer 2009 Blockbuster	Aspect Ratio, Paramount Pictures	Won	
Golden Trailer Awards	June 4, 2009	Best Summer 2009 TV Spot	Intralink Film, Paramount Pictures	Won	
Golden Trailer Awards	June 4, 2009	Best Summer 2009 Blockbuster Poster	BLT & Associates Inc., Paramount Pictures	Won	
Golden Trailer Awards	June 4, 2009	Best Music	Aspect Ratio, Paramount Pictures	Nominated	
Grammy Awards	January 31, 2010	Best Score Soundtrack for Visual Media	Michael Giacchino	Nominated	
Hollywood Film Festival Awards	October 27, 2009	Hollywood Movie Award	Star Trek	Won	
Hollywood Post Alliance Awards	November 12, 2009	Outstanding Editing - Feature Film	Maryann Brandon and Mary Jo Markey	Nominated	
Hollywood Post Alliance Awards	November 12, 2009	Outstanding Compositing - Feature Film	Eddie Pasquarello, Grady Cofer, Greg Salter, Connie Fauser	Nominated	
Hugo Awards	September 5, 2010	Best Dramatic Presentation – Long Form	J. J. Abrams, Alex Kurtzman, Roberto Orci	Nominated	
IFMCA Awards	March 1, 2010	Best Original Score For a Science Fiction/Fantasy Film	Michael Giacchino	Won	
IFMCA Awards	March 1, 2010	Film Score of the Year	Michael Giacchino	Nominated	
IFMCA Awards	March 1, 2010	Film Music Composition of the Year	Michael Giacchino for "Enterprising Young Men"	Nominated	
MTV Movie Awards	June 6, 2010	Best Breakthrough Performance	Chris Pine	Nominated	
MTV Movie Awards	June 6, 2010	Biggest Badass Star	Chris Pine	Nominated	
National Board of Review Awards	January 14, 2009	Top Ten Films	Star Trek	Won	
Online Film Critics Society Awards	January 3, 2010	Best Original Score	Michael Giacchino	Won	
People's Choice Awards	January 5, 2011	Favorite Movie	Star Trek	Nominated	
People's Choice Awards	January 5, 2011	Favorite Breakout Movie Actor	Chris Pine	Nominated	
People's Choice Awards	January 5, 2011	Favorite Breakout Movie Actor	Zachary Quinto	Nominated	
People's Choice Awards	January 5, 2011	Favorite Breakout Movie Actress	Zoe Saldaña	Nominated	
Producers Guild of America Awards	January 24, 2010	Best Theatrical Motion Picture	J. J. Abrams, Damon Lindelof	Nominated	
Satellite Awards	December 19, 2010	Best Overall Blu-ray Disc	Star Trek	Won	
Saturn Awards	June 24, 2010	Best Science Fiction Film	Star Trek	Nominated	
Saturn Awards	June 24, 2010	Best Director	J. J. Abrams	Nominated	
Saturn Awards	June 24, 2010	Best Writing	Alex Kurtzman, Roberto Orci	Nominated	
Saturn Awards	June 24, 2010	Best Production Design	Scott Chambliss	Nominated	
Saturn Awards	June 24, 2010	Best Special Effects	Burt Dalton, Russell Earl, Roger Guyett, Paul Kavanagh	Nominated	
Saturn Awards	June 24, 2010	Best Make-up	Barney Burman, Mindy Hall, Joel Harlow	Won	
Saturn Awards	June 24, 2010	The George Pal Memorial Award	Alex Kurtzman, Roberto Orci	Won	
Scream Awards	October 17, 2009	The Ultimate Scream	Star Trek	Won	
Scream Awards	October 17, 2009	Best Science Fiction Movie	Star Trek	Won	
Scream Awards	October 17, 2009	Best Science Fiction Actress	Zoe Saldaña	Nominated	
Scream Awards	October 17, 2009	Best Science Fiction Actor	Zachary Quinto	Nominated	
Scream Awards	October 17, 2009	Best Science Fiction Actor	Chris Pine	Won	
Scream Awards	October 17, 2009	Best Supporting Actor	Simon Pegg	Nominated	
Scream Awards	October 17, 2009	Best Supporting Actor	Leonard Nimoy	Nominated	
Scream Awards	October 17, 2009	Breakout Performance – Female	Zoe Saldaña	Nominated	
Scream Awards	October 17, 2009	Breakout Performance – Male	Chris Pine	Nominated	
Scream Awards	October 17, 2009	Best Ensemble	Star Trek	Nominated	
Scream Awards	October 17, 2009	Best Cameo	Winona Ryder	Won	
Scream Awards	October 17, 2009	Best Director	J. J. Abrams	Won	
Scream Awards	October 17, 2009	Best F/X	Star Trek	Nominated	
Scream Awards	October 17, 2009	Best Villain	Eric Bana	Nominated	
Scream Awards	October 17, 2009	Best Scream-Play	Alex Kurtzman, Roberto Orci	Nominated	
Scream Awards	October 17, 2009	Holy S***! Scene of the Year	Space Dive Onto Orbital Drill	Nominated	
Scream Awards	October 17, 2009	Fight Scene of the Year	Kirk vs. Spock	Won	
Screen Actors Guild Awards	January 23, 2010	Outstanding Performance by a Stunt Ensemble in a Motion Picture	Robert Alonzo, Daniel Arrias, Sala Baker, Steve Blalock, Joey Box, Ben Bray, Mark Chadwick, Ilram Choi, Zach Duhame, Peter Epstein, Jeremy Fitzgerald, Terry Jackson, Craig Jensen, Paul Lacovara, Rob Mars, Mike Massa, Heidi Moneymaker, Mike Mukatis, Courtney Munch, Kimberly Murphy, Chris Palermo, Jim Palmer, Eddie Perez, Dan Plum, Damion Poitier, Susan Purkhiser, Mike Snyder, Dennis Scott, Chris Torres, Christina Weathersby, Webster Whinery, Jr., Marcus Young	Won	
SFX Awards	February 6, 2010	Best Film	Star Trek	Nominated	
SFX Awards	February 6, 2010	Best Actor	Zachary Quinto	Nominated	
SFX Awards	February 6, 2010	Best Director	J. J. Abrams	Won	
St. Louis Gateway Film Critics Association Awards	December 21, 2009	Best Visual Effects	Burt Dalton, Russell Earl, Roger Guyett, Paul Kavanagh	Nominated	
Taurus World Stunt Awards	May 15, 2010	Best Fire	Mark Chadwick	Nominated	
Taurus World Stunt Awards	May 15, 2010	Best High Work	Daniel Arrias, Ilram Choi, Paul Lacovara, Mike Massa, Anthony R. Molinari	Nominated	
Taurus World Stunt Awards	May 15, 2010	Best Specialty Stunt	Paul Lacovara, Mike Massa	Nominated	
Taurus World Stunt Awards	May 15, 2010	Hardest Hit	Anthony R. Molinari	Nominated	
Taurus World Stunt Awards	May 15, 2010	Best Stunt Coordination and/or 2nd Unit Direction	Joey Box, Terry Jackson	Nominated	
Teen Choice Awards	August 9, 2009	Choice Action Movie Actress	Zoe Saldaña	Nominated	
Teen Choice Awards	August 9, 2009	Choice Movie Rumble	Chris Pine, Zachary Quinto	Nominated	
Teen Choice Awards	August 9, 2009	Choice Summer Movie: Action	Star Trek	Nominated	
Teen Choice Awards	August 9, 2009	Choice Movie Villain	Eric Bana	Nominated	
Teen Choice Awards	August 9, 2009	Choice Action Movie	Star Trek	Nominated	
Teen Choice Awards	August 9, 2009	Choice Breakout Movie Actor	Chris Pine	Nominated	
Visual Effects Society Awards	February 10, 2010	Outstanding Visual Effects in a Visual Effects Driven Feature Motion Picture	Burt Dalton, Russell Earl, Roger Guyett, Shari Hanson	Nominated	
Visual Effects Society Awards	February 10, 2010	Outstanding Matte Paintings in a Feature Motion Picture	Brett Northcutt, Shane Roberts, Masahiko Tani, Dan Wheaton	Nominated	
Washington D.C. Area Film Critics Association Awards	December 7, 2009	Best Ensemble	Star Trek	Nominated	
Washington D.C. Area Film Critics Association Awards	December 7, 2009	Best Art Direction	Scott Chambliss, Karen Manthey	Nominated	
World Soundtrack Awards	October 17, 2009	Soundtrack Composer of the Year	Michael Giacchino	Nominated	
Writers Guild of America Awards	February 20, 2010	Best Adapted Screenplay	Alex Kurtzman, Roberto Orci	Nominated	

== See also ==
- 2009 in film
