= List of accolades received by Star Trek films =

Star Trek is an American media franchise based on the science fiction television series created by Gene Roddenberry. The first television series, simply called Star Trek and now referred to as "The Original Series", debuted in 1966 and aired for three seasons on NBC. The Star Trek canon includes The Original Series, seven spin-off television series, two animated series, and thirteen films.

Star Trek (2009) won an Academy Award for Best Makeup and Hair. This is the first Academy Award for the Star Trek franchise: there have been sixteen nominations since the first Star Trek movie in 1979: three for Star Trek: The Motion Picture, four for Star Trek IV: The Voyage Home, two for Star Trek VI: The Undiscovered Country, one for Star Trek: First Contact, four for Star Trek (2009), one for Star Trek Into Darkness and one for Star Trek Beyond.

Star Trek: The Motion Picture received a Golden Globe nomination for Best Original Score, this is the only time a Star Trek film has been nominated for a Golden Globe.

Currently, of the thirteen Star Trek films, only Star Trek V: The Final Frontier has not received a Saturn Award nomination for Best Science Fiction Film.

== Accolades ==
=== Academy Awards ===
Year	Category	Film	Nominee(s)	Result	Ref.
1980	Best Art Direction	Star Trek: The Motion Picture	Harold Michelson, Joseph R. Jennings, Leon Harris, John Vallone (Art director(s)), Linda DeScenna (Set decorator)	Nominated	
1980	Best Visual Effects	Star Trek: The Motion Picture	Douglas Trumbull, John Dykstra, Richard Yuricich, Robert Swarthe, David Stewart, Grant McCune	Nominated	
1980	Best Original Score	Star Trek: The Motion Picture	Jerry Goldsmith	Nominated	
1987	Best Original Score	Star Trek IV: The Voyage Home	Leonard Rosenman	Nominated	
1987	Best Cinematography	Star Trek IV: The Voyage Home	Donald Peterman	Nominated	
1987	Best Sound Mixing	Star Trek IV: The Voyage Home	Terry Porter, David J. Hudson, Mel Metcalfe, Gene Cantamessa	Nominated	
1987	Best Sound Editing	Star Trek IV: The Voyage Home	Mark Mangini	Nominated	
1992	Best Sound Editing	Star Trek VI: The Undiscovered Country	George Watters II, F. Hudson Miller	Nominated	
1992	Best Makeup	Star Trek VI: The Undiscovered Country	Michael Mills, Edward French, Richard Snell	Nominated	
1997	Best Makeup	Star Trek: First Contact	Michael Westmore, Scott Wheeler, Jake Garber	Nominated	
2010	Best Makeup	Star Trek	Barney Burman, Mindy Hall and Joel Harlow	Won	
2010	Best Sound Editing	Star Trek	Mark Stoeckinger and Alan Rankin	Nominated	
2010	Best Sound Mixing	Star Trek	Anna Behlmer, Andy Nelson and Peter J. Devlin	Nominated	
2010	Best Visual Effects	Star Trek	Roger Guyett, Russell Earl, Paul Kavanagh and Burt Dalton	Nominated	
2014	Best Visual Effects	Star Trek Into Darkness	Roger Guyett, Patrick Tubach, Ben Grossmann, and Burt Dalton	Nominated	
2017	Best Makeup and Hairstyling	Star Trek Beyond	Joel Harlow and Richard Alonzo	Nominated	

=== Golden Globe Awards ===
Year	Category	Film	Nominee	Result	Ref.
1980	Best Original Score	Star Trek: The Motion Picture	Jerry Goldsmith	Nominated	

=== Hugo Award ===
Year	Category	Film	Nominee(s)	Result	Ref.
1980	Best Dramatic Presentation	Star Trek: The Motion Picture	Robert Wise (director), Harold Livingstonn (screenplay), Alan Dean Foster (story), Gene Roddenberry (story)	Nominated	
1983	Best Dramatic Presentation	Star Trek II: The Wrath of Khan	Nicholas Meyer (director, screenplay), Jack B. Sowards (screenplay, story), Harve Bennett (story), Samuel A. Peeples (story)	Nominated	
1985	Best Dramatic Presentation	Star Trek III: The Search for Spock	Leonard Nimoy (director), Harve Bennett (screenplay)	Nominated	
1987	Best Dramatic Presentation	Star Trek IV: The Voyage Home	Leonard Nimoy (director, story), Harve Bennett (screenplay, story), Steve Meerson (screenplay), Peter Krikes (screenplay), Nicholas Meyer (screenplay)	Nominated	
1992	Best Dramatic Presentation	Star Trek VI: The Undiscovered Country	Nicholas Meyer (director, screenplay), Denny Martin Flinn (screenplay), Leonard Nimoy (story), Lawrence Konner (story), Mark Rosenthal (story)	Nominated	
1995	Best Dramatic Presentation	Star Trek Generations	David Carson (director), Ronald D. Moore (screenplay, story), Brannon Braga (screenplay, story), Rick Berman (story)	Nominated	
1997	Best Dramatic Presentation	Star Trek: First Contact	Jonathan Frakes (director), Ronald D. Moore (screenplay, story), Brannon Braga (screenplay, story), Rick Berman (story)	Nominated	
1999	Best Dramatic Presentation	Star Trek: Insurrection	Jonathan Frakes (director), Michael Piller (screenplay, story), Rick Berman (story)	Nominated	
2010	Best Dramatic Presentation (Long Form)	Star Trek	J. J. Abrams (director), Roberto Orci (screenplay), Alex Kurtzman (screenplay)	Nominated	

=== Saturn Awards ===
Year	Category	Film	Nominee(s)	Result	Ref.						
1980	Best Science Fiction Film	Star Trek: The Motion Picture		Nominated	rowspan="10"	-	Best Actor	William Shatner	Nominated		
1980	Best Actress	Star Trek: The Motion Picture	Persis Khambatta	Nominated							
1980	Best Supporting Actor	Star Trek: The Motion Picture	Leonard Nimoy	Nominated							
1980	Best Supporting Actress	Star Trek: The Motion Picture	Nichelle Nichols	Nominated							
1980	Best Director	Star Trek: The Motion Picture	Robert Wise	Nominated							
1980	Best Music	Star Trek: The Motion Picture	Jerry Goldsmith	Nominated							
1980	Best Costumes	Star Trek: The Motion Picture	Robert Fletcher	Nominated							
1980	Best Make-up	Star Trek: The Motion Picture	Fred B. Phillips, Janna Phillips, Ve Neill	Nominated							
1980	Best Special Effects	Star Trek: The Motion Picture	Douglas Trumbull, John Dykstra, Richard Yuricich	Won							
1980	1983	Star Trek: The Motion Picture	Best Science Fiction Film	Star Trek II: The Wrath of Khan		Nominated	rowspan="8"	-	Best Actor	William Shatner	Won
Best Supporting Actor	1983	Walter Koenig	Nominated	Star Trek II: The Wrath of Khan							
Best Supporting Actress	1983	Kirstie Alley	Nominated	Star Trek II: The Wrath of Khan							
Best Director	1983	Nicholas Meyer	Won	Star Trek II: The Wrath of Khan							
Best Writing	1983	Jack B. Sowards	Nominated	Star Trek II: The Wrath of Khan							
Best Costumes	1983	Robert Fletcher	Nominated	Star Trek II: The Wrath of Khan							
Best Make-up	1983	Werner Keppler, James Lee McCoy	Nominated	Star Trek II: The Wrath of Khan							
1985	1983	Best Science Fiction Film	Star Trek III: The Search for Spock	Star Trek II: The Wrath of Khan		Nominated	rowspan="6"	-	Best Actor	William Shatner	Nominated
1985	Best Supporting Actress	Judith Anderson	Star Trek III: The Search for Spock	Nominated							
1985	Best Director	Leonard Nimoy	Star Trek III: The Search for Spock	Nominated							
1985	Best Costumes	Robert Fletcher	Star Trek III: The Search for Spock	Nominated							
1985	Best Special Effects	Ralph Winter	Star Trek III: The Search for Spock	Nominated							
1985	1987	Best Science Fiction Film	Star Trek III: The Search for Spock	Star Trek IV: The Voyage Home		Nominated	rowspan="11"	-	Best Actor	Leonard Nimoy	Nominated
William Shatner	1987	Nominated		Star Trek IV: The Voyage Home					Best Actor		
Best Supporting Actor	1987	James Doohan	Nominated	Star Trek IV: The Voyage Home							
Best Supporting Actor	1987	Walter Koenig	Nominated	Star Trek IV: The Voyage Home							
Best Supporting Actress	1987	Catherine Hicks	Nominated	Star Trek IV: The Voyage Home							
Best Director	1987	Leonard Nimoy	Nominated	Star Trek IV: The Voyage Home							
Best Writing	1987	Steve Meerson, Peter Krikes, Harve Bennett and Nicholas Meyer	Nominated	Star Trek IV: The Voyage Home							
Best Costumes	1987	Robert Fletcher	Won	Star Trek IV: The Voyage Home							
Best Make-up	1987	Wes Dawn, Jeff Dawn, James Lee McCoy	Nominated	Star Trek IV: The Voyage Home							
Best Special Effects	1987	Ken Ralston, Michael Lantieri	Won	Star Trek IV: The Voyage Home							
1993	1987	Best Science Fiction Film	Star Trek VI: The Undiscovered Country	Star Trek IV: The Voyage Home		Won	rowspan="5"	-	Best Supporting Actress	Kim Cattrall	Nominated
1993	Best Writing	Nicholas Meyer, Denny Martin Flinn	Star Trek VI: The Undiscovered Country	Nominated							
1993	Best Costumes	Dodie Shepard	Star Trek VI: The Undiscovered Country	Nominated							
1993	Best Make-up	Michael Mills, Edward French	Star Trek VI: The Undiscovered Country	Nominated							
1993	1995	Best Science Fiction Film	Star Trek VI: The Undiscovered Country	Star Trek Generations		Nominated					
Best Supporting Actress	1995	Whoopi Goldberg	Nominated	Star Trek Generations							
1997	Best Science Fiction Film	Star Trek: First Contact		Nominated	rowspan="10"	-	Best Actor	Patrick Stewart	Nominated		
1997	Best Supporting Actor	Star Trek: First Contact	Brent Spiner	Won							
1997	Best Supporting Actress	Star Trek: First Contact	Alice Krige	Won							
1997	Best Director	Star Trek: First Contact	Jonathan Frakes	Nominated							
1997	Best Writing	Star Trek: First Contact	Ronald D. Moore, Brannon Braga	Nominated							
1997	Best Music	Star Trek: First Contact	Jerry Goldsmith	Nominated							
1997	Best Costumes	Star Trek: First Contact	Deborah Everton	Won							
1997	Best Make-up	Star Trek: First Contact	Michael Westmore, Scott Wheeler, Jake Garber	Nominated							
1997	Best Special Effects	Star Trek: First Contact	John Knoll	Nominated							
1997	1999	Star Trek: First Contact	Best Science Fiction Film	Star Trek: Insurrection		Nominated					
Best Make-up	1999	Michael Westmore	Nominated	Star Trek: Insurrection							
2002	Best Classic Film DVD Release	Star Trek: The Motion Picture		Nominated							
2003	Best Science Fiction Film	Star Trek: Nemesis		Nominated							
2003	Best Supporting Actor	Star Trek: Nemesis	Tom Hardy	Nominated							
2003	Best Costumes	Star Trek: Nemesis	Bob Ringwood	Nominated							
2003	Best Make-up	Star Trek: Nemesis	Michael Westmore	Nominated							
2003	Best Classic Film DVD Release	Star Trek II: The Wrath of Khan		Nominated							
2010	Best Science Fiction Film	Star Trek		Nominated							
2010	Best Director	Star Trek	J. J. Abrams	Nominated							
2010	Best Writing	Star Trek	Roberto Orci, Alex Kurtzman	Nominated							
2010	Best Production Design	Star Trek	Scott Chambliss	Nominated							
2010	Best Make-up	Star Trek	Barney Burman, Mindy Hall, Joel Harlow	Won							
2010	Best Special Effects	Star Trek	Roger Guyett, Russell Earl, Paul Kavanagh, Burt Dalton	Nominated							
2010	Best DVD Collection	Star Trek: Original Motion Picture Collection (Star Trek: The Motion Picture, Star Trek II: The Wrath of Khan, Star Trek III: The Search for Spock, Star Trek IV: The Voyage Home, Star Trek V: The Final Frontier, Star Trek VI: The Undiscovered Country)		Won							
2014	Best Science Fiction Film	Star Trek Into Darkness		Nominated							
2014	Best Supporting Actor	Star Trek Into Darkness	Benedict Cumberbatch	Nominated							
2014	Best Director	Star Trek Into Darkness	J. J. Abrams	Nominated							
2014	Best Costumes	Star Trek Into Darkness	Michael Kaplan	Nominated							
2014	Best Special Effects	Star Trek Into Darkness	Patrick Tubach, Ben Grossmann and Burt Dalton	Nominated							
2017	Best Science Fiction Film	Star Trek Beyond		Nominated							
2017	Best Actor	Star Trek Beyond	Chris Pine	Nominated							
2017	Best Supporting Actor	Star Trek Beyond	Zachary Quinto	Nominated							
2017	Best Make-up	Star Trek Beyond	Joel Harlow and Monica Huppert	Won							

=== Golden Raspberry Awards ===
Year	Category	Film	Nominee(s)	Result	Ref.
1990	Worst Picture	Star Trek V: The Final Frontier	Harve Bennett	Won	
1990	Worst Actor	Star Trek V: The Final Frontier	William Shatner	Won	
1990	Worst Director	Star Trek V: The Final Frontier	William Shatner	Won	
1990	Worst Supporting Actor	Star Trek V: The Final Frontier	DeForest Kelley	Nominated	
1990	Worst Screenplay	Star Trek V: The Final Frontier	David Loughery	Nominated	
1990	Worst Picture of the Decade	Star Trek V: The Final Frontier	Harve Bennett	Nominated	
1995	Worst Supporting Actor	Star Trek Generations	William Shatner	Nominated	
