= Visual Effects Society Award for Outstanding Visual Effects in a Photoreal Feature =

Annual US film award

The Visual Effects Society Award for Outstanding Visual Effects in a Photoreal Picture is one of the annual awards given by the Visual Effects Society starting in 2002. While the award's title has changed several time within this period, the recipient has always been a visual effects-heavy feature film; films with more background effects work have their own category, the Visual Effects Society Award for Outstanding Supporting Visual Effects in a Feature Motion Picture.

== Winners and nominees ==
Table key
‡	Indicates the Academy Award winner

=== 2000s ===
Outstanding Visual Effects in an Effects Driven Motion Picture

Year	Film	Nominee(s)
2002	The Lord of the Rings: The Two Towers ‡	Jim Rygiel, Joe Letteri, Randall William Cook, Alex Funke
2002	Men in Black II	John Andrew Berton Jr., Tom Bertino, Bill Westenhofer, Erik Mattson
2002	Star Wars: Episode II – Attack of the Clones	John Knoll, Ben Snow, Pablo Helman, Rob Coleman
2003	The Lord of the Rings: The Return of the King ‡	Jim Rygiel, Dean Wright, Joe Letteri, Randall William Cook
2003	The Matrix Revolutions	John Gaeta, Kim Libreri, George Murphy, Craig Hayes
2003	Pirates of the Caribbean: The Curse of the Black Pearl	John Knoll, Patrick T. Myers, Hal Hickel, Jill Brooks
2004	Harry Potter and the Prisoner of Azkaban	Roger Guyett, Tim Burke, Theresa Corrao, Emma Norton
2004	The Day After Tomorrow	Karen E. Goulekas, Mike Chambers, Greg Strause, Remo Balcells
2004	Spider-Man 2 ‡	John Dykstra, Lydia Bottegoni, Anthony LaMolinara, Scott Stokdyk
2005	King Kong ‡	Joe Letteri, Eileen Moran, Christian Rivers, Eric Saindon
2005	The Chronicles of Narnia: The Lion, the Witch and the Wardrobe	Dean Wright, Randy Starr, Bill Westenhofer, Jim Berney
2005	Harry Potter and the Goblet of Fire	Jim Mitchell, Theresa Corrao, Tim Alexander, Tim Webber
2005	Star Wars: Episode III – Revenge of the Sith	John Knoll, Roger Guyett, Rob Coleman, Denise Ream
2006	Pirates of the Caribbean: Dead Man's Chest ‡	John Knoll, Jill Brooks, Hal Hickel, Charles Gibson
2006	Charlotte's Web	Karin Joy, Blair Clark, John Dietz
2006	The Fountain	Jeremy Dawson, Dan Schrecker, Mark G. Soper, Peter Parks
2007	Transformers	Scott Farrar, Shari Hanson, Russell Earl, Scott Benza
2007	The Golden Compass ‡	Michael L. Fink, Susan MacLeod, Bill Westenhofer, Ben Morris
2007	I Am Legend	Janek Sirrs, Mike Chambers, Jim Berney, Crys Forsyth-Smith
2007	Pirates of the Caribbean: At World's End	John Knoll, Jill Brooks, Hal Hickel, Charles Gibson
2007	Spider-Man 3	Scott Stokdyk, Terry Clotiaux, Peter Nofz, Spencer Cook
2008	The Curious Case of Benjamin Button ‡	Eric Barba, Edson Williams, Nathan McGuinness, Lisa Beroud
2008	The Chronicles of Narnia: Prince Caspian	Wendy Rogers, Dean Wright, Andrew Fowler, Greg Butler
2008	Cloverfield	Kevin Blank, Chantal Feghali, Michael Ellis, Eric Leven
2008	Hellboy II: The Golden Army	Mike Wassel, Lucy Killick, Adrian De Wet, Eamonn Butler
2008	Iron Man	Ben Snow, Hal Hickel, Victoria Alonso, John Nelson
2009	Avatar ‡	Joe Letteri (visual effects supervisor); Richard Baneham (animation supervisor); Joyce Cox, Eileen Moran (vfx producers)
2009	2012	Volker Engel, Marc Weigert (visual effects supervisors); Josh R. Jaggars (vfx producer)
2009	District 9	Dan Kaufman (vfx supervisor), Peter Muyzers (on-set vfx plate supervisor), James Stewart (creature supervisor), Stefanie Boose (vfx producer)
2009	Star Trek	Burt Dalton (special effects supervisor); Russell Earl, Roger Guyett (visual effects supervisors); Shari Hanson (visual effects producer)
2009	Transformers: Revenge of the Fallen	Scott Farrar (visual effects supervisor), John Frazier (special effects supervisor), Scott Benza (animation director), Wayne Billheimer (visual effects producer)

=== 2010s ===
Year	Film	Nominee(s)
2010	Inception ‡	Paul Franklin (visual effects supervisor); Chris Corbould (special effects supervisor); Mike Chambers, Matthew Plummer (visual effects producers)
2010	Alice in Wonderland	Ken Ralston (senior visual effects supervisor), Carey Villegas (visual effects supervisor), David Schaub (animation supervisor), Tom Peitzman (visual effects producer)
2010	Harry Potter and the Deathly Hallows – Part 1	Tim Burke (overall visual effects supervisor), John Richardson, Emma Norton (visual effects producer)
2010	Iron Man 2	Janek Sirrs, Ben Snow, Ged Wright (visual effects supervisors); Susan Pickett (visual effects producer)
2010	Tron: Legacy	Eric Barba (visual effects supervisor), Steve Preeg (animation director), Steve Gaub (sequence supervisor), Lisa Beroud (visual effects producer)
2011	Rise of the Planet of the Apes	Dan Lemmon, Joe Letteri, Cyndi Ochs, Kurt Williams
2011	Captain America: The First Avenger	Charlie Noble, Mark G. Soper, Christopher Townsend, Edson Williams
2011	Harry Potter and the Deathly Hallows – Part 2	Tim Burke, Emma Norton, John Richardson, David Vickery
2011	Pirates of the Caribbean: On Stranger Tides	Gary Brozenich, David Conley, Charles Gibson, Ben Snow
2011	Transformers: Dark of the Moon	Scott Benza, Wayne Billheimer, Matthew E. Butler, Scott Farrar
2012	Life of Pi ‡	Donald Elliott, Susan MacLeod, Guillaume Rocheron, Bill Westenhofer
2012	The Avengers	Susan Pickett, Janek Sirrs, Jeff White, Guy Williams
2012	Battleship	Grady Cofer, Pablo Helman, Kevin Elam, Glen McIntosh
2012	The Hobbit: An Unexpected Journey	Joe Letteri, Eileen Moran, Eric Saindon, Kevin L. Sherwood
2012	Prometheus	Paul Butterworth, Charley Henley, Allen Maris, Richard Stammers
2013	Gravity ‡	Tim Webber, Nikki Penny, Neil Corbould, Richard McBride
2013	The Hobbit: The Desolation of Smaug	Joe Letteri, Eric Saindon, Kevin L. Sherwood, David Clayton
2013	Iron Man 3	Christopher Townsend, Mark G. Soper, Guy Williams, Bryan Grill
2013	Pacific Rim	John Knoll, Susan Greenhow, Christopher Raimo, Hal Hickel
2013	Star Trek Into Darkness	Roger Guyett, Luke O'Byrne, Ron Ames, Ben Grossmann

Outstanding Visual Effects in a Visual Effects-Driven Photoreal/Live Action Feature Motion Picture

Year	Film	Nominee(s)
2014	Dawn of the Planet of the Apes	Joe Letteri, Ryan Stafford, Matt Kutcher, Dan Lemmon, Hannah Bianchini
2014	Guardians of the Galaxy	Stephane Ceretti, Susan Pickett, Jonathan Fawkner, Nicolas Aithadi, Paul Corbould
2014	The Hobbit: The Battle of the Five Armies	Joe Letteri, David Conley, Eric Saindon, Kevin L. Sherwood, Steve Ingram
2014	Interstellar ‡	Paul Franklin, Kevin Elam, Ann Podlozny, Andrew Lockley, Scott R. Fisher
2014	Maleficent	Carey Villegas, Barrie Hemsley, Adam Valdez, Kelly Port, Michael Dawson
2014	X-Men: Days of Future Past	Richard Stammers, Blondel Aidoo, Lou Pecora, Anders Langlands, Cameron Waldbauer

Outstanding Visual Effects in a Photoreal Feature

Year	Film	Nominee(s)
2015	Star Wars: The Force Awakens	Roger Guyett, Luke O'Byrne, Patrick Tubach, Paul Kavanagh, Chris Corbould
2015	Furious 7	Mike Wassel, Karen M. Murphy, Martin Hill, Kelvin McIlwain, Dan Sudick
2015	Mad Max: Fury Road	Andrew Jackson, Holly Radcliffe, Tom Wood, Fiona Crawford, Dan Oliver
2015	The Martian	Richard Stammers, Barrie Hemsley, Matt Sloan, Chris Lawrence, Steven Warner
2015	San Andreas	Colin Strause, Randy Starr, Bryan Grill, Nordin Rahhali, Brian Cox
2016	The Jungle Book ‡	Robert Legato, Joyce Cox, Andrew R. Jones, Adam Valdez, J.D. Schwalm
2016	Doctor Strange	Stephane Ceretti, Susan Pickett, Richard Bluff, Vincent Cirelli, Paul Corbould
2016	Fantastic Beasts and Where to Find Them	Christian Manz, Olly Young, Tim Burke, Pablo Grillo, David Watkins
2016	Miss Peregrine's Home for Peculiar Children	Frazer Churchill, Hal Couzens, Andrew Lockley, Jelmer Boskma, Hayley J. Williams
2016	Rogue One: A Star Wars Story	John Knoll, Erin D. O'Connor, Hal Hickel, Nigel Sumner, Neil Corbould
2017	War for the Planet of the Apes	Joe Letteri, Ryan Stafford, Daniel Barrett, Dan Lemmon, Joel Whist
2017	Blade Runner 2049 ‡	John Nelson, Karen M. Murphy, Paul Lambert, Richard R. Hoover, Gerd Nefzer
2017	Guardians of the Galaxy Vol. 2	Christopher Townsend, Damien Carr, Guy Williams, Jonathan Fawkner, Dan Sudick
2017	Kong: Skull Island	Jeff White, Tom C. Peitzman, Stephen Rosenbaum, Scott Benza, Michael Meinardus
2017	Star Wars: The Last Jedi	Ben Morris, Tim Keene, Eddie Pasquarello, Dan Seddon, Chris Corbould
2018	Avengers: Infinity War	Dan DeLeeuw, Jen Underdahl, Kelly Port, Matt Aitken, Dan Sudick
2018	Christopher Robin	Chris Lawrence, Steve Gaub, Mike Eames, Glenn Melenhorst, Chris Corbould
2018	Ready Player One	Roger Guyett, Jennifer Meislohn, Dave Shirk, Matthew E. Butler, Neil Corbould
2018	Solo: A Star Wars Story	Rob Bredow, Erin D. O'Connor, Matt Shumway, Patrick Tubach, Dominic Tuohy
2018	Welcome to Marwen	Kevin Baillie, Sandra Scott, Seth Hill, Marc Chu, James Paradis
2019	The Lion King	Robert Legato, Tom C. Peitzman, Adam Valdez, Andrew R. Jones
2019	Alita: Battle Angel	Richard E. Hollander, Kevin L. Sherwood, Eric Saindon, Richard Baneham, Bob Trevino
2019	Avengers: Endgame	Dan DeLeeuw, Jen Underdahl, Russell Earl, Matt Aitken, Dan Sudick
2019	Gemini Man	Bill Westenhofer, Karen M. Murphy, Guy Williams, Sheldon Stopsack, Mark Hawker
2019	Star Wars: The Rise of Skywalker	Roger Guyett, Stacy Bissell, Patrick Tubach, Neal Scanlan, Dominic Tuohy

=== 2020s ===
Year	Film	Nominee(s)
2020	The Midnight Sky	Matt Kasmir, Greg Baxter, Chris Lawrence, Max Solomon, David Watkins
2020	Jingle Jangle: A Christmas Journey	Brad Parker, Roma Van Den Bergh, Eric Guaglione, Carlos Monzon, Stefano Pepin
2020	Project Power	Ivan Moran, Leslie Hough, Joao Sita, Matthew Twyford, Yves Debono
2020	Tenet‡	Andrew Jackson, Mike Chambers, Andrew Lockley, David Lee, Scott Fisher
2020	The Witches	Kevin Baillie, Sandra Scott, Sean Konrad, Glenn Melenhorst, Mark Holt
2021	Dune ‡	Paul Lambert, Brice Parker, Tristan Myles, Brian Connor, Gerd Nefzer
2021	Godzilla vs. Kong	John "D.J." Des Jardin, Tamara Kent, Bryan Hirota, Kevin Smith, Mike Meinardus
2021	The Matrix Resurrections	Dan Glass, Nina Fallon, Tom Debenham, Huw J Evans, James Schwalm
2021	No Time to Die	Charlie Noble, Mara Bryan, Joel Green, Jonathan Fawkner, Chris Courbold
2021	Shang-Chi and the Legend of the Ten Rings	Christopher Townsend, Damien Carr, Joe Farrell, Sean Walker, Dan Oliver
2021	Spider-Man: No Way Home	Kelly Port, Julia Neighly, Chris Waegner, Scott Edelstein, Dan Sudick
2022	Avatar: The Way of Water ‡	Richard Baneham, Walter Garcia, Joe Letteri, Eric Saindon, J. D. Schwalm
2022	The Batman	Dan Lemmon, Bryan Searing, Russell Earl, Anders Langlands, Dominic Tuohy
2022	Fantastic Beasts: The Secrets of Dumbledore	Christian Manz, Olly Young, Benjamin Loch, Stephane Naze, Alistair Williams
2022	Jurassic World Dominion	David Vickery, Ann Podlozny, ance Rubinchik, Dan Snape, Paul Corbould
2022	Top Gun: Maverick	Ryan Tudhope, Paul Molles, Seth Hill, Bryan Litson, Scott Fisher
2023	The Creator	Jay Cooper, Julian Levi, Ian Comley, Charmaine Chan, Neil Corbould
2023	Dungeons & Dragons: Honor Among Thieves	Ben Snow, Diana Giorgiutti, Khalid Almeerani, Scott Benza, Sam Conway
2023	Guardians of the Galaxy Vol. 3	Stéphane Ceretti, Susan Pickett, Alexis Wajsbrot, Guy Williams, Dan Sudick
2023	Indiana Jones and the Dial of Destiny	Andrew Whitehurst, Kathy Siegel, Robert Weaver, Julian Hutchens, Alistair Williams
2023	Oppenheimer	Andrew Jackson, Mike Chambers, Giacomo Mineo, Dave Drzewiecki, Scott R. Fisher
2024	Kingdom of the Planet of the Apes	Erik Winquist, Julia Neighly, Paul Story, Danielle Immerman, Rodney Burke
2024	Better Man	Luke Millar, Andy Taylor, David Clayton, Keith Herft, Peter Stubbs
2024	Dune: Part Two‡	Paul Lambert, Brice Parker, Stephen James, Rhys Salcombe, Gerd Nefzer
2024	Mufasa: The Lion King	Adam Valdez, Barry St. John, Audrey Ferrara, Daniel Fotheringham
2024	Twisters	Ben Snow, Mark Soper, Florian Witzel, Susan Greenhow, Scott Fisher
2025	Avatar: Fire and Ash	Richard Baneham, Peter Litvack, Eric Saindon, Nicky Muir, Steve Ingram
2025	F1	Ryan Tudhope, Nikeah Forde, Robert Harrington, Nicolas Chevallier, Keith Alfred Dawson
2025	How To Train Your Dragon	Christian Manz, Christopher Raimo, Glen McIntosh, Glenn Melenhorst, Terry Palmer
2025	Jurassic World: Rebirth	David Vickery, Carlos Ciudad, Steve Aplin, Charmaine Chan, Neil Corbould
2025	The Lost Bus	Richard Baneham, Peter Litvack, Eric Saindon, Nicky Muir, Steve Ingram
