= List of accolades received by Avengers: Endgame =

Avengers: Endgame accolades
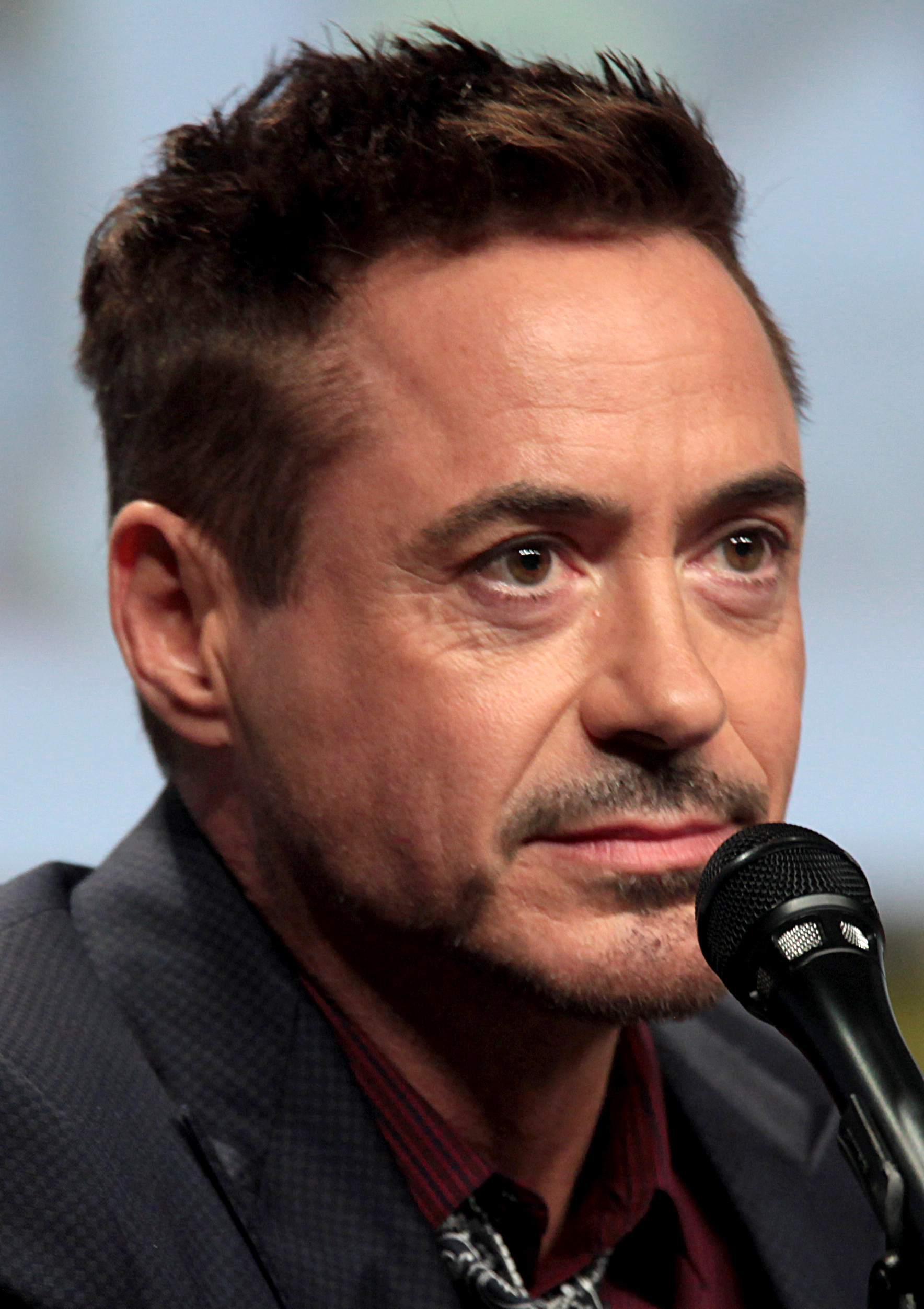
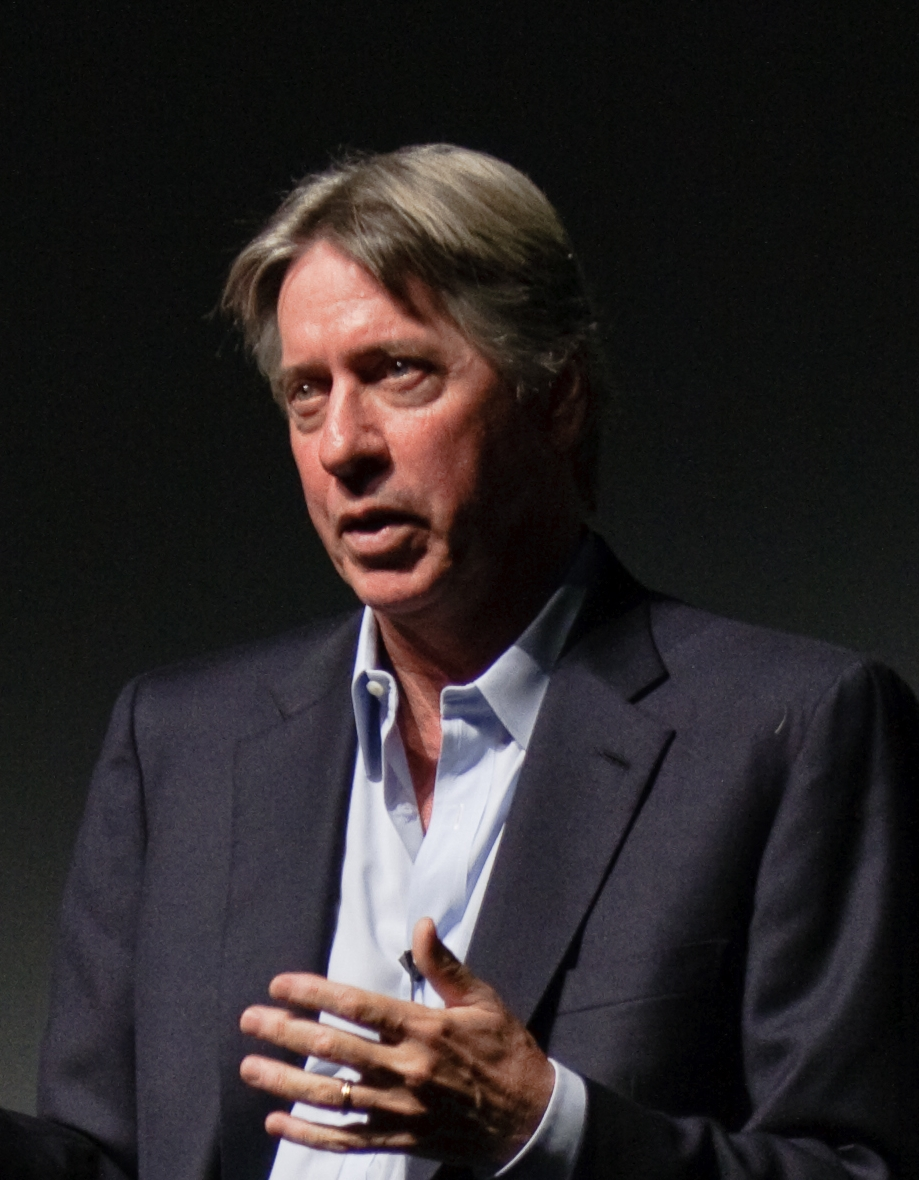
- Actor Robert Downey Jr. and composer Alan Silvestri received multiple awards and nominations for their respective work in the film.
Awards and nominations
Award	Wins	Nominations
Academy Awards	0	1
Annie Awards	1	1
Art Directors Guild Awards	1	1
Artios Awards	0	1
Austin Film Critics Association Awards	1	3
BET Awards	0	1
BAFTA Film Awards	0	1
Chicago Film Critics Association Awards	0	1
Costume Designers Guild Awards	0	1
Critics' Choice Movie Awards	2	3
Dragon Awards	1	1
Florida Film Critics Circle Awards	1	1
Golden Reel Awards	0	2
Golden Trailer Awards	2	10
Grammy Awards	0	1
Harvey Awards	0	1
Hollywood Critics Association Awards	2	6
Hollywood Film Awards	1	1
Hollywood Music in Media Awards	1	1
Hollywood Professional Association Awards	0	1
Houston Film Critics Society Awards	0	1
Hugo Awards	0	1
ICG Publicists Awards	0	1
International Film Music Critics Association Awards	0	2
Lumiere Awards	1	1
Make-Up Artists & Hair Stylists Guild Awards	0	1
Movieguide Awards	0	1
MTV Movie & TV Awards	3	4
National Film & TV Awards	0	6
Nebula Awards	0	1
Nickelodeon Kids' Choice Awards	2	11
People's Choice Awards	3	7
San Diego Film Critics Society Awards	0	1
Satellite Awards	0	2
Saturn Awards	6	14
Screen Actors Guild Awards	1	1
Seattle Film Critics Society Awards	0	2
Society of Composers & Lyricists Awards	0	1
St. Louis Film Critics Association Awards	2	4
Teen Choice Awards	4	9
Visual Effects Society Awards	0	3
Washington D.C. Area Film Critics Association Awards	1	1
World Soundtrack Awards	0	1

Totals (Note: Certain award groups do not simply award one winner. They acknowledge several different recipients, have runners-up, and have third place. Since this is a specific recognition and is different from losing an award, runner-up mentions are considered wins in this award tally. For simplification and to avoid errors, each award in this list has been presumed to have had a prior nomination.)
- Wins: 36
- Nominations: 116

Avengers: Endgame is a 2019 American superhero film based on the Marvel Comics superhero team the Avengers. Produced by Marvel Studios and distributed by Walt Disney Studios Motion Pictures, it is the direct sequel to Avengers: Infinity War (2018) and the 22nd film in the Marvel Cinematic Universe (MCU). Directed by Anthony and Joe Russo and written by Christopher Markus and Stephen McFeely, the film features an ensemble cast including Robert Downey Jr., Chris Evans, Mark Ruffalo, Chris Hemsworth, Scarlett Johansson, Jeremy Renner, Don Cheadle, Paul Rudd, Brie Larson, Karen Gillan, Danai Gurira, Benedict Wong, Jon Favreau, Bradley Cooper, Gwyneth Paltrow, and Josh Brolin. In the film, the surviving members of the Avengers and their allies attempt to reverse Thanos's actions in Infinity War which erased half of all life in the universe.

Avengers: Endgame premiered in Los Angeles on April 22, 2019, and was theatrically released in the United States on April 26, as part of Phase Three of the MCU. Produced on a budget of $356–400 million, Endgame grossed $2.798 billion worldwide, surpassing Infinity War's entire theatrical run in just eleven days and breaking numerous box office records, including becoming the highest-grossing film of all time; it held the record between July 2019 until March 2021, and is the highest grossing film since October 2026. On the review aggregator website Rotten Tomatoes, the film holds an approval rating of 94% based on 551 reviews.

Avengers: Endgame garnered awards and nominations in various categories with particular recognition for its acting (mainly that of Downey) and visual effects. It received a nomination for Best Visual Effects at the 92nd Academy Awards. The film won Outstanding Achievement for Character Animation in a Live Action Production at the 47th Annie Awards. At the 73rd British Academy Film Awards, Avengers: Endgame was nominated for Best Special Visual Effects. It received three nominations at the 25th Critics' Choice Awards and won Best Visual Effects and Best Action Movie. Composer Alan Silvestri received a nomination for Best Score Soundtrack for Visual Media at the Grammy Awards' 62nd ceremony. The film won six of fourteen nominations at the 45th Saturn Awards.

== Accolades ==
Accolades received by Avengers: Endgame
Award	Date of ceremony	Category	Recipient(s)	Result	Ref.
Academy Awards	February 9, 2020	Best Visual Effects	Dan DeLeeuw, Matt Aitken, Russell Earl, and Dan Sudick	Nominated	
Annie Awards	January 25, 2020	Outstanding Achievement for Character Animation in a Live Action Production	Sidney Kombo-Kintombo	Won	
Art Directors Guild Awards	February 1, 2020	Excellence in Production Design for a Fantasy Film	Charles Wood	Won	
Artios Awards	January 30, 2020	The Zeitgeist Award	Sarah Halley Finn, Chase Paris, Tara Feldstein Bennett, and Jason B. Stamey	Nominated	
Austin Film Critics Association Awards	January 6, 2020	Best Motion Capture/Special Effects Performance	Mark Ruffalo	Nominated	
Austin Film Critics Association Awards	January 6, 2020	Best Motion Capture/Special Effects Performance	Josh Brolin	Won	
Austin Film Critics Association Awards	January 6, 2020	Best Stunts	Avengers: Endgame	Nominated	
BET Awards	June 23, 2019	Best Actor	Chadwick Boseman	Nominated	
British Academy Film Awards	February 2, 2020	Best Special Visual Effects	Dan DeLeeuw and Dan Sudick	Nominated	
Chicago Film Critics Association Awards	December 14, 2019	Best Use of Visual Effects	Avengers: Endgame	Nominated	
Costume Designers Guild Awards	January 28, 2020	Excellence in Sci-Fi/Fantasy Film	Judianna Makovsky	Nominated	
Critics' Choice Movie Awards	January 12, 2020	Best Visual Effects	Avengers: Endgame	Won	
Critics' Choice Movie Awards	January 12, 2020	Best Action Movie	Avengers: Endgame	Won	
Critics' Choice Movie Awards	January 12, 2020	Best Sci-Fi/Horror Movie	Avengers: Endgame	Nominated	
Dragon Awards	September 1, 2019	Best Science Fiction or Fantasy Movie	Avengers: Endgame	Won	
Florida Film Critics Circle Awards	December 23, 2019	Best Visual Effects	Avengers: Endgame	Runner-up	
Golden Reel Awards	January 19, 2020	Outstanding Achievement in Sound Editing – Dialogue and ADR for Feature Film	Daniel Laurie, Shannon Mills, Jacob Riehle, and Brad Semenoff	Nominated	
Golden Reel Awards	January 19, 2020	Outstanding Achievement in Sound Editing – Sound Effects and Foley for Feature Film	Daniel Laurie, Shannon Mills, Nia Hansen, David Farmer, John Gold, Samson Neslund, Steve Orlando, John Roesch, Shelley Roden, Dan O’Connell, John Cucci, Christopher Flick, and Jim Likowski	Nominated	
Golden Trailer Awards	May 29, 2019	Best Fantasy Adventure	"Reflections" (MOCEAN)	Won	
Golden Trailer Awards	May 29, 2019	Best Original Score	"Capstone" (MOCEAN)	Nominated	
Golden Trailer Awards	May 29, 2019	Best Action TV Spot (for a Feature Film)	"Super Bowl Spot" (The Hive)	Nominated	
Golden Trailer Awards	May 29, 2019	Best Fantasy Adventure TV Spot (for a Feature Film)	"Overpower" (MOCEAN)	Won	
Golden Trailer Awards	May 29, 2019	Best Fantasy Adventure Poster	"Payoff One-Sheet" (Lindeman & Associates)	Nominated	
Golden Trailer Awards	May 29, 2019	Best International Poster	"Payoff One-Sheet" (Lindeman & Associates)	Nominated	
Golden Trailer Awards	July 22, 2021	Best Home Ent Action	"Announce Trailer" (Tiny Hero)	Nominated	
Golden Trailer Awards	July 22, 2021	Best Home Ent Action	"Target Wall" (Tiny Hero)	Nominated	
Golden Trailer Awards	July 22, 2021	Best Home Ent Fantasy Adventure	"Announce Trailer" (Tiny Hero)	Nominated	
Golden Trailer Awards	July 22, 2021	Best Home Ent Fantasy Adventure	"Target Wall" (Tiny Hero)	Nominated	
Grammy Awards	January 26, 2020	Best Score Soundtrack for Visual Media	Alan Silvestri	Nominated	
Harvey Awards	October 4, 2019	Best Adaptation From a Comic	Avengers: Endgame	Nominated	
Hollywood Critics Association Awards	January 9, 2020	Best Cast	Avengers: Endgame	Nominated	
Hollywood Critics Association Awards	January 9, 2020	Best Action / War Film	Avengers: Endgame	Nominated	
Hollywood Critics Association Awards	January 9, 2020	Best Blockbuster	Avengers: Endgame	Won	
Hollywood Critics Association Awards	January 9, 2020	Best Stunt Work	Avengers: Endgame	Nominated	
Hollywood Critics Association Awards	January 9, 2020	Best Visual Effects	Dan DeLeeuw, Matt Aitken, Russell Earl, and Dan Sudick	Won	
Hollywood Critics Association Awards	January 9, 2020	Best Animated or VFX Performance	Josh Brolin	Nominated	
Hollywood Film Awards	November 3, 2019	Hollywood Blockbuster Award	Kevin Feige and Victoria Alonso	Won	
Hollywood Music in Media Awards	November 20, 2019	Best Original Score – Sci-fi/Fantasy	Alan Silvestri	Won	
Hollywood Professional Association Awards	November 21, 2019	Outstanding Visual Effects – Feature Film	Matt Aitken, Sidney Kombo, Sean Noel Walker, David Conley, and Marvyn Young	Nominated	
Houston Film Critics Society Awards	January 2, 2020	Best Visual Effects	Avengers: Endgame	Nominated	
Hugo Awards	August 1, 2020	Best Dramatic Presentation – Long Form	Christopher Markus and Stephen McFeely and Russo brothers	Nominated	
ICG Publicists Awards	February 7, 2020	Maxwell Weinberg Publicists Showmanship Motion Picture Award	Avengers: Endgame	Nominated	
International Film Music Critics Association Awards	February 20, 2020	Best Original Score for a Fantasy/Science Fiction/Horror Film	Alan Silvestri	Nominated	
International Film Music Critics Association Awards	February 20, 2020	Film Music Composition of the Year	Alan Silvestri for "Portals"	Nominated	
Lumiere Awards	January 22, 2020	Best Feature Film – Live Action	Avengers: Endgame	Won	
Make-Up Artists & Hair Stylists Guild Awards	January 11, 2020	Feature-Length Motion Picture: Best Contemporary Make-Up	John Blake and Francisco Perez	Nominated	
Movieguide Awards	January 24, 2020	Best Movie for Mature Audiences	Avengers: Endgame	Nominated	
MTV Movie & TV Awards	June 17, 2019	Best Movie	Avengers: Endgame	Won	
MTV Movie & TV Awards	June 17, 2019	Best Hero	Robert Downey Jr.	Won	
MTV Movie & TV Awards	June 17, 2019	Best Villain	Josh Brolin	Won	
MTV Movie & TV Awards	June 17, 2019	Best Fight	Captain America vs. Thanos	Nominated	
National Film & TV Awards	December 3, 2019	Best Feature Film	Avengers: Endgame	Nominated	
National Film & TV Awards	December 3, 2019	Best Actor	Robert Downey Jr.	Nominated	
National Film & TV Awards	December 3, 2019	Best Actress	Scarlett Johansson	Nominated	
National Film & TV Awards	December 3, 2019	Best Performance in a Movie	Mark Ruffalo	Nominated	
National Film & TV Awards	December 3, 2019	Best Performance in a Movie	Don Cheadle	Nominated	
National Film & TV Awards	December 3, 2019	Best Producer	Kevin Feige	Nominated	
Nebula Awards	May 31, 2020	Ray Bradbury Nebula Award for Outstanding Dramatic Presentation	Christopher Markus and Stephen McFeely	Nominated	
Nickelodeon Kids' Choice Awards	May 2, 2020	Favorite Movie	Avengers: Endgame	Won	
Nickelodeon Kids' Choice Awards	May 2, 2020	Favorite Movie Actor	Chris Evans	Nominated	
Nickelodeon Kids' Choice Awards	May 2, 2020	Favorite Movie Actor	Chris Hemsworth	Nominated	
Nickelodeon Kids' Choice Awards	May 2, 2020	Favorite Movie Actress	Scarlett Johansson	Nominated	
Nickelodeon Kids' Choice Awards	May 2, 2020	Favorite Movie Actress	Brie Larson (Note: Also for Captain Marvel (2019))	Nominated	
Nickelodeon Kids' Choice Awards	May 2, 2020	Favorite Superhero	Robert Downey Jr.	Nominated	
Nickelodeon Kids' Choice Awards	May 2, 2020	Favorite Superhero	Chris Evans	Nominated	
Nickelodeon Kids' Choice Awards	May 2, 2020	Favorite Superhero	Chris Hemsworth	Nominated	
Nickelodeon Kids' Choice Awards	May 2, 2020	Favorite Superhero	Tom Holland (Note: Also for Spider-Man: Far From Home (2019))	Won	
Nickelodeon Kids' Choice Awards	May 2, 2020	Favorite Superhero	Scarlett Johansson	Nominated	
Nickelodeon Kids' Choice Awards	May 2, 2020	Favorite Superhero	Brie Larson	Nominated	
People's Choice Awards	November 10, 2019	Movie of 2019	Avengers: Endgame	Won	
People's Choice Awards	November 10, 2019	Action Movie of 2019	Avengers: Endgame	Won	
People's Choice Awards	November 10, 2019	Male Movie Star of 2019	Robert Downey Jr.	Won	
People's Choice Awards	November 10, 2019	Male Movie Star of 2019	Chris Hemsworth	Nominated	
People's Choice Awards	November 10, 2019	Female Movie Star of 2019	Scarlett Johansson	Nominated	
People's Choice Awards	November 10, 2019	Action Movie Star of 2019	Robert Downey Jr.	Nominated	
People's Choice Awards	November 10, 2019	Action Movie Star of 2019	Chris Evans	Nominated	
San Diego Film Critics Society Awards	December 9, 2019	Best Visual Effects	Avengers: Endgame	Nominated	
Satellite Awards	December 19, 2019	Best Sound (Editing and Mixing)	Shannon Mills, Daniel Laurie, Tom Johnson, Juan Peralta, and John Pritchett	Nominated	
Satellite Awards	December 19, 2019	Best Visual Effects	Dan DeLeeuw, Matt Aitken, Russell Earl, and Dan Sudick	Nominated	
Saturn Awards	September 13, 2019	Best Comic-to-Film Motion Picture	Avengers: Endgame	Won	
Saturn Awards	September 13, 2019	Best Actor	Robert Downey Jr.	Won	
Saturn Awards	September 13, 2019	Best Actor	Chris Evans	Nominated	
Saturn Awards	September 13, 2019	Best Supporting Actor	Jeremy Renner	Nominated	
Saturn Awards	September 13, 2019	Best Supporting Actress	Karen Gillan	Nominated	
Saturn Awards	September 13, 2019	Best Supporting Actress	Scarlett Johansson	Nominated	
Saturn Awards	September 13, 2019	Best Director	Anthony and Joe Russo	Nominated	
Saturn Awards	September 13, 2019	Best Writing	Christopher Markus and Stephen McFeely	Nominated	
Saturn Awards	September 13, 2019	Best Production Design	Charles Wood	Won	
Saturn Awards	September 13, 2019	Best Editing	Jeffrey Ford and Matthew Schmidt	Won	
Saturn Awards	September 13, 2019	Best Music	Alan Silvestri	Nominated	
Saturn Awards	September 13, 2019	Best Costume Design	Judianna Makovsky	Nominated	
Saturn Awards	September 13, 2019	Best Make-up	John Blake and Brian Sipe	Won	
Saturn Awards	September 13, 2019	Best Special Effects	Avengers: Endgame	Won	
Screen Actors Guild Awards	January 19, 2020	Outstanding Action Performance by a Stunt Ensemble in a Motion Picture	Avengers: Endgame	Won	
Seattle Film Critics Society	December 16, 2019	Best Action Choreography	Avengers: Endgame	Nominated	
Seattle Film Critics Society	December 16, 2019	Best Visual Effects	Dan DeLeeuw, Matt Aitken, Russell Earl, and Dan Sudick	Nominated	
Society of Composers & Lyricists Awards	January 7, 2020	Outstanding Original Score for a Studio Film	Alan Silvestri	Nominated	
St. Louis Film Critics Association Awards	December 15, 2019	Best Visual Effects	Avengers: Endgame	Won	
St. Louis Film Critics Association Awards	December 15, 2019	Best Music Score	Alan Silvestri	Nominated	
St. Louis Film Critics Association Awards	December 15, 2019	Best Action Film	Avengers: Endgame	Runner-up	
St. Louis Film Critics Association Awards	December 15, 2019	Best Scene	"Avengers Assemble"	Nominated	
Teen Choice Awards	August 11, 2019	Choice Action Movie	Avengers: Endgame	Won	
Teen Choice Awards	August 11, 2019	Choice Action Movie Actor	Robert Downey Jr.	Won	
Teen Choice Awards	August 11, 2019	Choice Action Movie Actor	Chris Evans	Nominated	
Teen Choice Awards	August 11, 2019	Choice Action Movie Actor	Chris Hemsworth	Nominated	
Teen Choice Awards	August 11, 2019	Choice Action Movie Actor	Paul Rudd	Nominated	
Teen Choice Awards	August 11, 2019	Choice Action Movie Actress	Scarlett Johansson	Won	
Teen Choice Awards	August 11, 2019	Choice Action Movie Actress	Brie Larson	Nominated	
Teen Choice Awards	August 11, 2019	Choice Action Movie Actress	Zoe Saldaña	Nominated	
Teen Choice Awards	August 11, 2019	Choice Movie Villain	Josh Brolin	Won	
Visual Effects Society Awards	January 29, 2020	Outstanding Visual Effects in a Photoreal Feature	Dan DeLeeuw, Jen Underdahl, Russell Earl, Matt Aitken, and Dan Sudick	Nominated	
Visual Effects Society Awards	January 29, 2020	Outstanding Animated Character in a Photoreal Feature	Kevin Martel, Ebrahim Jahromi, Sven Jensen, and Robert Allman	Nominated	
Visual Effects Society Awards	January 29, 2020	Outstanding Compositing in a Photoreal Feature	Tim Walker, Blake Winder, Tobias Wiesner, and Joerg Bruemmer	Nominated	
Washington D.C. Area Film Critics Association Awards	December 8, 2019	Best Motion Capture Performance	Josh Brolin	Won	
World Soundtrack Awards	October 18, 2019	Film Composer of the Year	Alan Silvestri (Note: Also for Welcome to Marwen (2018))	Nominated	
