= 36th Saturn Awards =

US film and television award ceremony

- Date: June 24, 2010
- Site: Burbank, California, U.S.

Highlights
- Most awards: Avatar (10)
- Most nominations: Avatar (10)

The 36th Saturn Awards, honoring the best in science fiction, fantasy and horror film and television in 2009 were presented on June 24, 2010, in Burbank, California. The most awards of the night were won by Avatar, winning all ten of its nominations. The film also won the Saturn Award for Best Special Edition DVD Release the following year.

Below is a complete list of nominees and winners. Winners are highlighted in boldface.

== Winners and nominees ==
=== Film ===
Best Science Fiction Film	Best Fantasy Film
**Avatar**; The Book of Eli; Knowing; Moon; Star Trek; Transformers: Revenge of the Fallen; X-Men Origins: Wolverine	**Watchmen**; Harry Potter and the Half-Blood Prince; The Lovely Bones; The Time Traveler’s Wife; Where the Wild Things Are
Best Horror or Thriller Film	Best Action or Adventure Film
**Drag Me to Hell**; The Box; Frozen; The Last House on the Left; The Twilight Saga: New Moon; Zombieland	**Inglourious Basterds**; 2012; Brothers; The Hurt Locker; Law Abiding Citizen; The Messenger; Sherlock Holmes
Best Actor	Best Actress
**Sam Worthington - Avatar as Jake Sully**; Robert Downey Jr. - Sherlock Holmes as Sherlock Holmes; Tobey Maguire - Brothers as Captain Sam Cahill; Viggo Mortensen - The Road as Man; Sam Rockwell - Moon as Samuel "Sam" Bell; Denzel Washington - The Book of Eli as Eli	**Zoe Saldaña - Avatar as Neytiri**; Catherine Keener - Where the Wild Things Are as Connie; Mélanie Laurent - Inglourious Basterds as Shosanna Dreyfus / Emanuelle Mimieux; Alison Lohman - Drag Me to Hell as Christine Brown; Natalie Portman - Brothers as Grace Cahill; Charlize Theron - The Burning Plain as Sylvia
Best Supporting Actor	Best Supporting Actress
**Stephen Lang - Avatar as Colonel Miles Quaritch**; Woody Harrelson - Zombieland as Tallahassee; Frank Langella - The Box as Arlington Steward; Jude Law - Sherlock Holmes as Dr. John Watson; Stanley Tucci - The Lovely Bones as George Harvey; Christoph Waltz - Inglourious Basterds as Hans Landa	**Sigourney Weaver - Avatar as Dr. Grace Augustine**; Malin Åkerman - Watchmen as Laurie Jupiter / Silk Spectre II; Diane Kruger - Inglourious Basterds as Bridget von Hammersmarck; Rachel McAdams - Sherlock Holmes as Irene Adler; Lorna Raver - Drag Me to Hell as Sylvia Ganush; Susan Sarandon - The Lovely Bones as Grandma Lynn
Best Performance by a Younger Actor	Best Director
**Saoirse Ronan - The Lovely Bones as Susie Salmon**; Taylor Lautner - The Twilight Saga: New Moon as Jacob Black; Bailee Madison - Brothers as Isabelle Cahill; Brooklynn Proulx - The Time Traveler’s Wife as Clare Abshire; Max Records - Where the Wild Things Are as Max; Kodi Smit-McPhee - The Road as Boy	**James Cameron - Avatar**; J. J. Abrams - Star Trek; Kathryn Bigelow - The Hurt Locker; Neill Blomkamp - District 9; Guy Ritchie - Sherlock Holmes; Zack Snyder - Watchmen; Quentin Tarantino - Inglourious Basterds
Best Writing	Best Music
**James Cameron - Avatar**; Neill Blomkamp, Terri Tatchell - District 9; Spike Jonze, Dave Eggers - Where the Wild Things Are; Alex Kurtzman, Roberto Orci - Star Trek; Quentin Tarantino - Inglourious Basterds; Alex Tse, David Hayter - Watchmen	**James Horner - Avatar**; Brian Eno - The Lovely Bones; Michael Giacchino - Up; Taro Iwashiro - Red Cliff; Christopher Young - Drag Me to Hell; Hans Zimmer - Sherlock Holmes
Best Costume	Best Make-Up
**Michael Wilkinson - Watchmen**; Colleen Atwood - Nine; Jenny Beavan - Sherlock Holmes; Anna B. Sheppard - Inglourious Basterds; Jany Temime - Harry Potter and the Half-Blood Prince; Timmy Yip - Red Cliff	**Barney Burman, Mindy Hall, Joel Harlow - Star Trek**; Joe Dunckley, Sarah Rubano, Frances Richardson - District 9; Sarah Monzani - The Imaginarium of Doctor Parnassus; Greg Nicotero, Howard Berger; The Book of Eli; Drag Me to Hell; Mike Smithson, John Rosengrant - Terminator Salvation
Best Production Design	Best Special Effects
**Rick Carter, Robert Stromberg - Avatar**; Scott Chambliss - Star Trek; Stuart Craig - Harry Potter and the Half-Blood Prince; Sarah Greenwood - Sherlock Holmes; Philip Ivey - District 9; Alex McDowell - Watchmen	**Joe Letteri, Stephen Rosenbaum, Richard Baneham, Andrew R. Jones - Avatar**; Tim Burke, John Richardson, Nicolas Aithadi, Tim Alexander - Harry Potter and the Half-Blood Prince; Volker Engel, Marc Weigert, Mike Vézina - 2012; Roger Guyett, Russell Earl, Paul Kavanagh, Burt Dalton - Star Trek; John 'D.J.' Des Jardin, Peter G. Travers, Joel Whist, Jessica Norman - Watchmen; Dan Kaufman, Peter Muyzers, Robert Habros, Matt Aitken - District 9
Best International Film	Best Animated Film
**District 9**; The Imaginarium of Doctor Parnassus; Lorna's Silence; Red Cliff; Taken; Thirst	**Monsters vs. Aliens**; Disney’s A Christmas Carol; Fantastic Mr. Fox; Ice Age: Dawn of the Dinosaurs; The Princess and the Frog; Up

=== Television ===
==== Programs ====
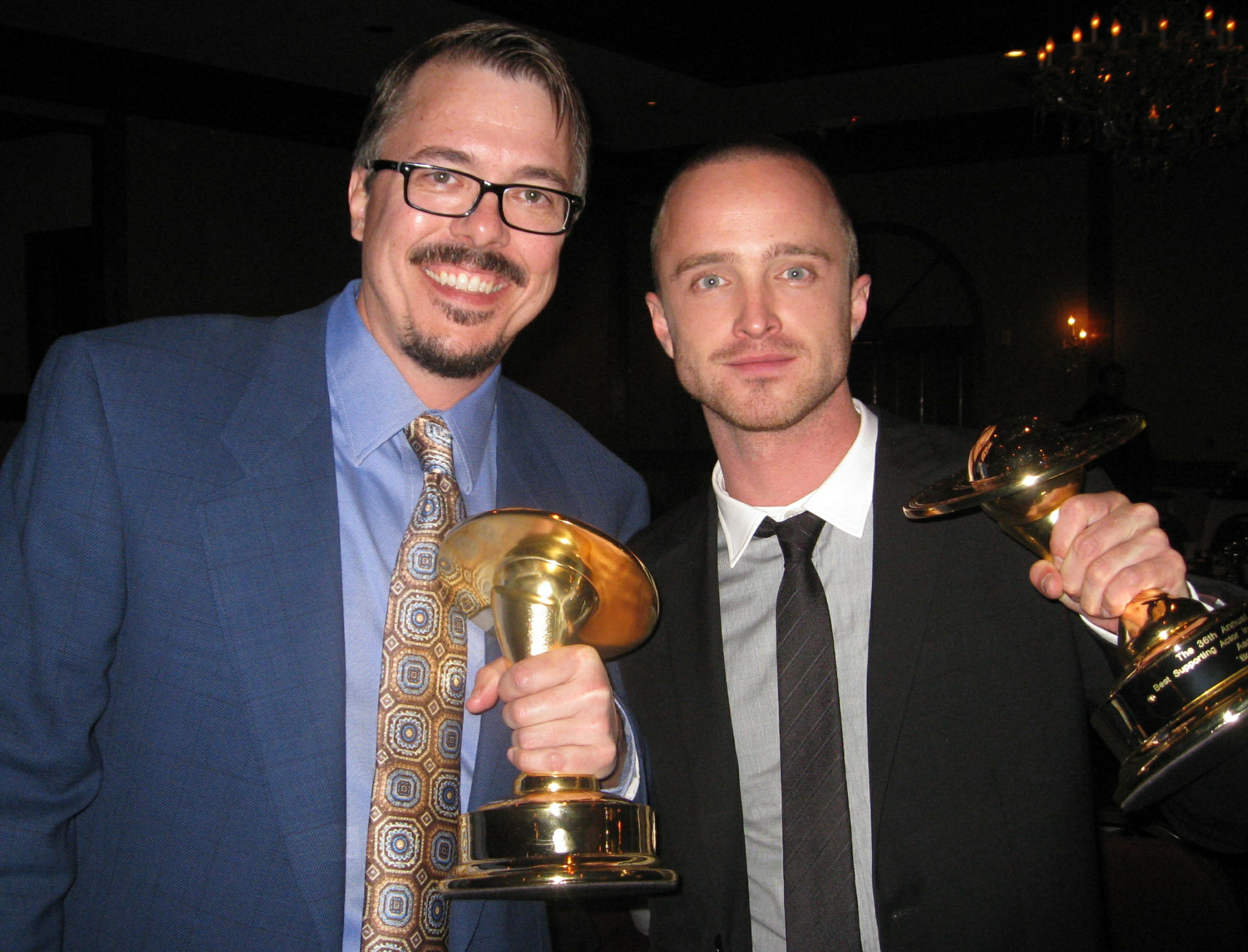
Vince Gilligan (left) and Aaron Paul display their Saturn Awards for Breaking Bad.

Best Network Television Series	Best Syndicated/Cable Television Series
**Lost (ABC)**; Chuck (NBC); Fringe (Fox); Ghost Whisperer (CBS); Heroes (NBC); The Vampire Diaries (The CW)	**Breaking Bad (AMC)**; Battlestar Galactica (Sci-Fi); The Closer (TNT); Dexter (Showtime); Leverage (TNT); True Blood (HBO)
Best Television Presentation
**Torchwood: Children of Earth (BBC America)**; Alice (Sci-Fi); "Doctor Who: The End of Time" (BBC America); The Prisoner (AMC); The Tudors (Showtime); V (ABC)

==== Acting ====
Best Actor on Television	Best Actress on Television
**Josh Holloway - Lost (ABC) as James "Sawyer" Ford**; Bryan Cranston - Breaking Bad (AMC) as Walter White; Matthew Fox - Lost (ABC) as Jack Shephard; Michael C. Hall - Dexter (Showtime) as Dexter Morgan; Zachary Levi - Chuck (NBC) as Chuck Bartowski; Stephen Moyer - True Blood (HBO) as Bill Compton; David Tennant - "Doctor Who: The End of Time" (BBC America)	**Anna Torv - Fringe (Fox) as Olivia Dunham**; Anna Gunn - Breaking Bad (AMC) as Skyler White; Jennifer Love Hewitt - Ghost Whisperer (CBS) as Melinda Gordon; Evangeline Lilly - Lost (ABC) as Kate Austen; Anna Paquin - True Blood (HBO) as Sookie Stackhouse; Kyra Sedgwick - The Closer (TNT) as Brenda Leigh Johnson
Best Supporting Actor on Television	Best Supporting Actress on Television
**Aaron Paul - Breaking Bad (AMC) as Jesse Pinkman**; Jeremy Davies - Lost (ABC) as Daniel Faraday; Michael Emerson - Lost (ABC) as Benjamin Linus; Aldis Hodge - Leverage (TNT) as Alec Hardison; John Noble - Fringe (Fox) as Walter Bishop; Alexander Skarsgård - True Blood (HBO) as Eric Northman	**Julie Benz - Dexter (Showtime) as Rita Bennett**; Morena Baccarin - V (ABC) as Anna; Gina Bellman - Leverage (TNT) as Sophie Devereaux; Jennifer Carpenter - Dexter (Showtime) as Debra Morgan; Elizabeth Mitchell - Lost (ABC) as Juliet Burke; Hayden Panettiere - Heroes (NBC) as Claire Bennett
Best Guest Performer on Television
**Leonard Nimoy - Fringe (Fox) as William Bell**; Bernard Cribbins - "Doctor Who: The End of Time" (BBC America) as Wilfred Mott; Raymond Cruz - Breaking Bad (AMC) as Tuco Salamanca; Michelle Forbes - True Blood (HBO) as Maryann Forrester; John Lithgow - Dexter (Showtime) as Arthur Mitchell; Mark Pellegrino - Lost (ABC) as Jacob

=== DVD ===
Best DVD Release	Best Special Edition DVD Release
**Nothing But the Truth**; House of the Devil; Laid to Rest; Not Forgotten; Pontypool; Super Capers; Surveillance	**Watchmen: The Ultimate Cut**; 300: The Complete Experience; Snow White and the Seven Dwarfs; District 9: Two-Disc Edition; Terminator 2: Judgment Day - Skynet Edition; X-Men Origins: Wolverine - Two-Disc Special Edition
Best DVD Collection	Best DVD Television Release
**Star Trek: Original Motion Picture Collection**; Columbia Pictures Film Noir Classics, Volume 1; The Hannibal Lecter Anthology; Hellraiser Boxed Set; Icons of Sci-Fi: Toho Collection; The William Castle Collection	**Lost: The Complete Fifth Season**; Life on Mars: The Complete Series; Doctor Who: Planet of the Dead; Primeval, Volume 2; Terminator: The Sarah Connor Chronicles - The Complete Second Season; Torchwood: Children of Earth

== Best Local Stage Production ==
=== Best Local Stage Production: Fantasy/Musical ===
- Mary Poppins (Ahmanson Theatre)

=== Best Local Stage Production: Play/Dramatic Musical ===
- Parade (Mark Taper Forum)

=== Best Local Stage Production: Small Theatre ===
- Fellowship: The Musical (Falcon Theatre)

== Special awards ==
=== Visionary Award ===
- James Cameron

=== Life Career Award ===
- Irvin Kershner

=== The George Pal Memorial Award ===
- Roberto Orci & Alex Kurtzman

=== The Producers Showcase Award ===
- Lauren Shuler Donner

== Multiple Nominations ==
The following films received multiple nominations:

- 10 nominations: Avatar
- 8 nominations: Sherlock Holmes
- 7 nominations: Inglourious Basterds and Watchmen
- 6 nominations: District 9 and Star Trek
- 5 nominations: Drag Me to Hell and The Lovely Bones
- 4 nominations: Brothers, Harry Potter and the Half-Blood Prince and Where the Wild Things Are
- 3 nominations: The Book of Eli and Red Cliff
- 2 nominations: 2012, The Box, The Hurt Locker, The Imaginarium of Doctor Parnassus, Moon, The Road, The Time Traveler's Wife, The Twilight Saga: New Moon, Up and Zombieland
