= Douglas Tait (actor) =

American actor, stuntman, and independent filmmaker (born 1978)

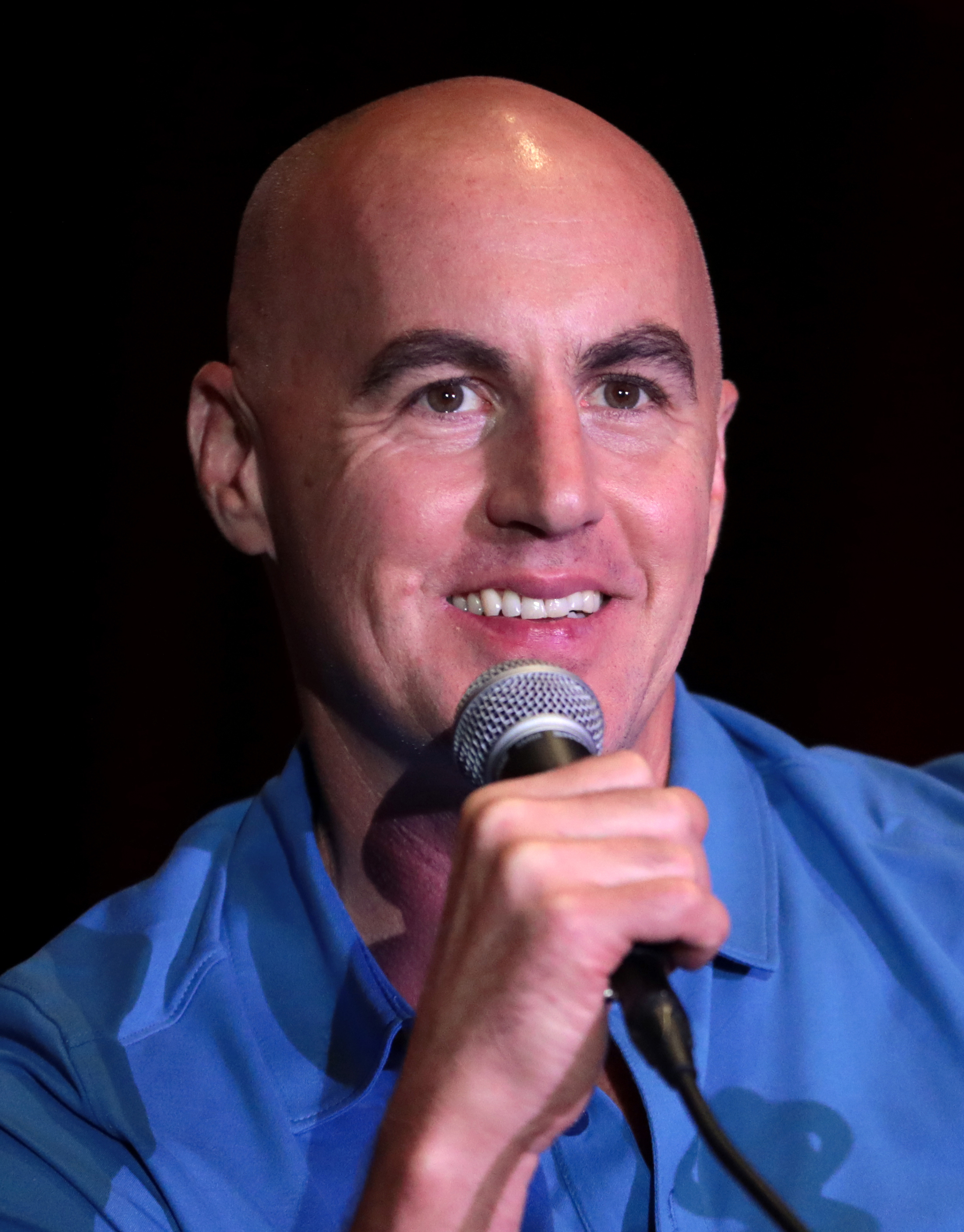
- Tait in 2023
- Born: December 17, 1978 (age 47); Tarzana, Los Angeles, California, U.S.
- Occupations: Film actor; Television actor; Independent filmmaker; Stuntman
- Years active: 1996–present
- Height: 6 ft 5 in (196 cm)
- Website: dougtait.blogspot.com

Douglas Tait (born December 17, 1978) is an American actor, and independent filmmaker. Tait has played characters in several films, including Freddy vs. Jason, Star Trek, Zathura: A Space Adventure, Land of the Lost, Annabelle Comes Home, and Hellboy.

== Early life ==
Tait was born in Tarzana, California. He attended Bishop Alemany High School in Los Angeles, California, where he played on the high school's basketball team.

== Entertainment career ==
=== Early work ===
Tait said in an interview that he was cast as a teen basketball player in television commercials because of his high school basketball experience. His first character role came during high school when he was hired to perform as "Frankenstein" in the live stage shows at Universal Studios Hollywood.

=== Character roles ===
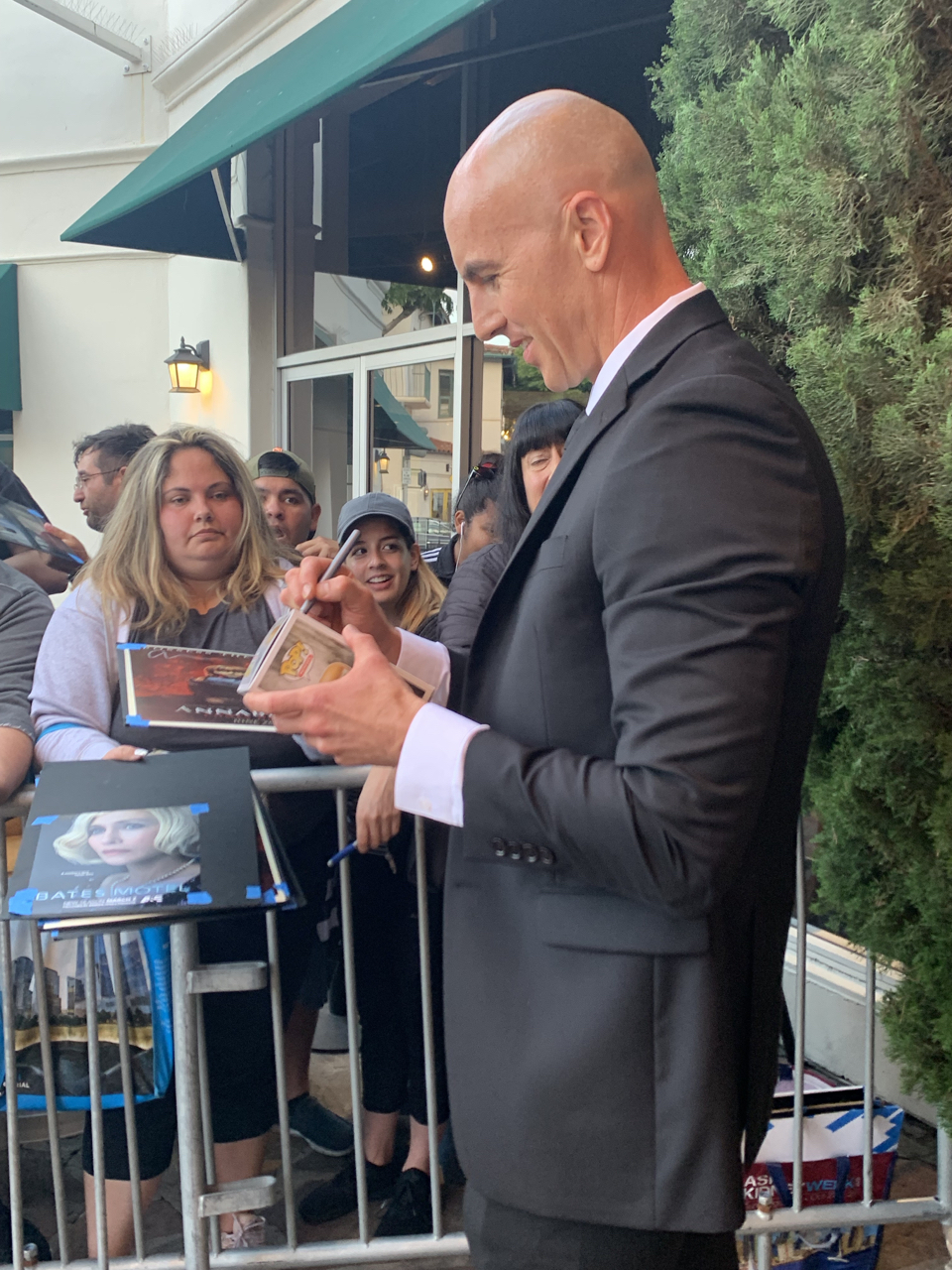
Douglas Tait signing autographs in 2019

He played the role of Jason Voorhees in the final scene of Freddy vs. Jason. He was one of three individuals to play the role of a "Zorgon" in Jon Favreau's Zathura: A Space Adventure. He played the role of "Abominog" in The Knights of Badassdom and a "Frost Giant" in Thor. He appeared as "Head Sleestak" in Land of the Lost.

He also played "Long Face Bar Alien" in J. J. Abrams's Star Trek. Makeup artist Barney Burman who, along with Mindy Hall and Joel Harlow, won the 2009 Academy Award for best makeup for their work in Star Trek noted that the work Burman did on Tait's character, Long Face Bar Alien, was especially complex.

In 2009, Tait was a member of the stunt ensemble for the 2008 film Indiana Jones and the Kingdom of the Crystal Skull that was nominated for a Screen Actors Guild Award in the category of "Outstanding Performance by a Stunt Ensemble in a Motion Picture".

In 2013, he was interviewed for a documentary film Crystal Lake Memories: The Complete History of Friday the 13th.

In 2014, Tait played Verlox in the ABC series The Quest. In 2015-2016, Tait played The Pathologist in the MTV series Teen Wolf.

In 2017, Tait played Skull Zerstörer on the NBC series Grimm. In 2018, Tait played Charon IV in Unfriended: Dark Web.

In 2019, Tait played the fairy Gruagach in the Hellboy reboot. In the same year, he also played the Werewolf in Annabelle Comes Home. In 2019-2022, Tait played Malivore on the CW series Legacies.

In 2021, Tait directed the feature film Angel Baby. In the same year, Tait was the Michael Myers Stunt Double in Halloween Kills. He also plays the Sasquatch in the famous "Jack Link's" Beef Jerky commercials from 2015-2025.

==== Starring/Supporting notable roles ====
- The Quest (TV Series) - Verlox 2014
- Teen Wolf (TV Series) - The Pathologist 2015-2016
- Havenhurst (Movie) - Jed 2016
- Grimm (TV Series) - Skull Zerstörer 2017
- Unfriended: Dark Web (Movie) - Charon IV 2018
- Hellboy (Movie) - Gruagach 2019
- Annabelle Comes Home (Movie) - Werewolf 2019
- Star Trek Picard (TV series) - Tellarite 2020
- The Girl In The Woods (TV Series) - The Brute 2021
- Legacies (TV Series) - Malivore 2019-2022
- Halloween Kills (Movie) - The Shape Stunt Double 2021

=== Independent film work ===
Tait was executive producer, along with Isabel Cueva, of "In The Name of Freedom", a 16-minute short film that appeared at the 14th Annual LA Shorts Fest in 2010. It was an Official Selection of the New York International Latino Film Festival, won in the category of "Best Drama Short" at the 2010 Los Angeles Women's International Film Festival, and won the "Best Fiction Short" category at the 2010 CINE Film and Video Competition.

He both produced and starred alongside Sally Kirkland and Tony Todd in the independent film One by One: Death's Door which, as re-titled Jack The Reaper, was picked up for distribution by American World Pictures.

Tait also starred in the 2008 independent film, The Season, which was screened at the 2011 New York International Independent Film and Video Festival. The film was also screened at the 2008 Melbourne Underground Film Festival, Screamfest Horror Film Festival, ShockerFest International Film Festival and Shriekfest, among others. In 2015, he starred in the Fetish horror film, "The Fiancée." and in the supernatural thriller, "Good Family Times."

==== Starring/Supporting notable roles ====
- Journey To The Forbidden Valley (Movie) - The Yeren 2017
- Wild Boar (Movie) - The Hunter 2019
- Attack Of The Unknown (Movie) - Maddox 2020
- Malibu Horror Story (Movie) - 2021
