= 8th Visual Effects Society Awards =

Award for the best visual effects in film and television

8th Visual Effects Society Awards

February 10, 2010

Best Visual Effects in a Visual Effects Driven Motion Picture:
Avatar

The 8th Visual Effects Society Awards, given on February 10, 2010 at the Century Plaza Hotel in Los Angeles, honored the best visual effects in film and television of 2009. The show was hosted by Sam Rubin and broadcast, in an edited form, by the ReelzChannel on March 5, 2010.

== Winners and nominees ==
(winners in bold)

=== Honorary Awards ===
Lifetime Achievement Award:

- **James Cameron**

George Melies Award for Pioneering:

- **Dr. Ed Catmull**

=== Film ===
Outstanding Visual Effects in a Visual Effects-Driven Feature Motion Picture	Outstanding Supporting Visual Effects in a Feature Motion Picture
**Avatar** – Joe Letteri, Joyce Cox, Eileen Moran, Richard Baneham: 2012 – Volker Engel, Marc Weigert, Josh Jaggars; District 9 – Dan Kaufman, Stefanie Boose, James Stewart, Peter Muyzers; Star Trek – Roger Guyett, Burt Dalton, Shari Hanson, Russell Earl; Transformers: Revenge of the Fallen – Scott Farrar, John Frazier, Scott Benza, Wayne Killheimer	**Sherlock Holmes** – Jonathan Fawkner, Chas Jarrett, David Vickery, Dan Barrow: Angels & Demons – Barrie Hemsley, Angus Bickerton, Ryan Cook, Mark Breakspear; The Box – Thomas Tannenberger, Olcun Tan, Mark Kolpak, Peter Cvijanovic; Invictus – Michael Owens, Geoff Hancock, Cyndi Ochs, Dennis Hoffman; The Road – Mark O. Forker, Phillip Moses, Ed Mendez, Paul Graff
Outstanding Animation in an Animated Feature Motion Picture	Best Single Visual Effect of the Year
**Up** – Pete Docter, Jonas Rivera, Steve May, Gary Bruins: 9 – Jinko Gotoh, Joe Ksander, Daryl Graham, Ken Duncan; Cloudy with a Chance of Meatballs – Pete Nash, Chris Juen, Alan Hawkins, Mike Ford; Coraline – Henry Selick, Claire Jennings; Ice Age: Dawn of the Dinosaurs – Melvin Tan, Galen Chu, Jeff Gabor, Anthony Nisi	**Avatar** - Neytiri Drinking – Joe Letteri, Joyce Cox, Eileen Moran, Thelvin Cabezas: 2012 - Escape from L.A. – Volker Engel, Marc Weigert, Josh R. Jaggars, Mohen Leo; Avatar - Quarich's Escape – John Knoll, Jill Brooks, Frank Losasso Petterson, Tory Mercer; Knowing - Plane Crash – Andrew Jackson, Camille Cellucci, Dan Breckwoldt, Angelo Sahin; Terminator Salvation - VLA Escape – Charles Gibson, Chantal Feghali, Ben Snow, Susan Greenhow
Outstanding Animated Character in a Live Action Feature Motion Picture	Outstanding Animated Character in an Animated Feature Motion Picture
**Avatar** - Neytiri – Joe Letteri, Andrew R. Jones, Jeff Unay, Zoe Saldaña: District 9 - Christopher Johnson – Steve Nichols, Jeremy Mesana, Vera Zivny, Brett Ineson; G-Force - Bucky – Benjamin Cinelli, Dustin Wicke, Peter Tieryas, Ryan Yee; Watchmen - Doctor Manhattan – Keith Smith, Kevin Hudson, Victor Schutz, Aaron Campbell	**Up** – Carl – Ed Asner, Ron Zorman, Brian Tindall, Carmen Ngai: Coraline - Coraline – Travis Knight, Trey Thomas; Ice Age: Dawn of the Dinosaurs - Buck – Simon Pegg, Peter de Sève; Monsters vs. Aliens - B.O.B. – David Burgess, Scott Cegielski, Terran Boylan, David Weatherley
Outstanding Models and Miniatures in a Feature Motion Picture	Outstanding Created Environment in a Feature Motion Picture
**Avatar** - Samson/Home Tree/ Floating Mountains / Ampsuit – Simon Cheung, Paul Jenness, John Stevenson-Galvin, Rainer Zoetti: Coraline – Deborah Cook, Paul Mack, Martin Meunier, Matthew DeLue; Night at the Museum: Battle of the Smithsonian - Battle of the Smithsonian - National Air and Space Museum Escape – Ian Hunter, Forest Fischer, Robert Chapin, Tony Chen; Terminator Salvation - Practical Models and Miniatures – Brian Gernand, Geoff Heron, Nick d'Abo, Patrick Sweeney	**Avatar** - Jungle/Biolume – Eric Saindon, Shadi Almassizadeh, Dan Cox, Ula Rademeyer: 2012 - Los Angeles Destruction – Haarm-Pieter Duiker, Marten Larsson, Ryo Sakaguchi, Hanzhi Tang; Avatar - Floating Mountains – Dan Lemmon, Keith F. Miller, Cameron Smith, Jessica Cowley; Avatar - Willow Glade – Guy Williams, Thelvin Cabezas, Daniel Macarin, Miae Kang
Outstanding Compositing in a Feature Motion Picture	Outstanding Effects Animation in an Animated Feature Motion Picture
**District 9** – Shervin Shogian, Hamish Schumacher, Janeen Elliott, Simon Hughes: Avatar – Erik Winquist, Robin Hollander, Erich Eder, Giuseppe Tagliavini; Avatar - End Battle – Eddie Pasquarello, Beth D'Amato, Todd Vaziri, Jay Cooper; Sherlock Holmes – Kate Windibank, Jan Adamczyk, Sam Osborne, Alex Cumming	**Up** – Jason Johnston, Alexis Angelidis, Jon Reisch, Eric Froemling: Cloudy with a Chance of Meatballs – Rob Bredow, Dan Kramer, Matt Hausman, Carl Hooper; Coraline - JohN Allan Armstrong, Richard Kent Burton, Craig Dowsett; Monsters vs. Aliens - Amaury Aubel, Alain De Hoe, David Allen

=== Television ===
Outstanding Visual Effects in a Broadcast Series	Outstanding Supporting Visual Effects in a Broadcast Program
**Battlestar Galactica - Season 4, Ep. 421 "Daybreak"** – Michael Gibson, Gary Hutzel, Jesse Toves, Dave Morton: Defying Gravity - Pilot – Sam Nicholson, Dale Fay, Mike Yip, Jared Jones; Fringe - Ep. 206, "Earthling" – Jay Worth, Robert Habros, Andrew Orlaff, Eric Hance; Stargate Universe - Air – Mark Savela, Shannon Gurney, Andrew Karr, Craig Vandenbiggelaar; V - Pilot – Andrew Orloff, Karen Czukerberg, Chris Zapara, Johnathan R. Banta	**CSI: Crime Scene Investigation - Ep 1001 "Opening Sequence"** – Rik Shorten, Sabrina Arnold, Steve Meyer, Derek Smith: FlashForward - No More Good Days – Kevin Blank, Andrew Orloff, Steve Meyer, Jonathan Spencer Levy; Kings - Ep. 001 "Goliath" – Craig Weiss, Ron Moore, Niel Wray, Brian Vogt; Krupp: A Family Between War and Peace - Thomas Tannenberger, Olcun Tan, Mark Kolpak, Shane Cook; Lost - The Incident Part 1 & 2 – Mitch Suskin, Samantha Mabie-Tuinstra, Eric Hance, Sean Scott
Outstanding Visual Effects in a Commercial	Outstanding Visual Effects in a Broadcast Miniseries, Movie or Special
**Audi - Intelligently Combined** – Jay Barton, Rafael F. Colon, Ronald Herbst, Chris Fieldhouse: AMF - The Caterpillar – Asher Edwards, Robert Sethi, Becky Porter, Jamie O'Hara; Kerry Lowlow - Mouse – Jake Mengers, Stephen Newbold, Ashley Bernes, Louisa Cartwright Tucker; Pepsi - The Flight of the Penguin – Murray Butler, Seth Gollub, Andy Walker, Jenn Dewey; Plane Stupid - Polar Bears – Jake Mengers, Vicky Osborn, Suzanne Jandu, Scott Griffin	**Disney Prep and Landing - Gadgets, Gloves and other Garish Gizmos** – Dorothy McKim, Scott Kersavage, David Hutchins, Kee Suong: Alice - Night 2 – Lee Wilson, Lisa Sepp-Wilson, Sebastien Bergeron, Les Quinn; Ben 10: Alien Swarm - Montage – Evan Jacobs, Sean McPherson, Andrew Orloff; Infestation – PJ Foley, Efram Potelle, James May, Dan DeEnremont; Skellig – Sara Bennett, Jenna Powell, David Houghton, Jean-Claude Deguara
Outstanding Animated Character in a Broadcast Program or Commercial	Outstanding Matte Paintings in a Broadcast Program or Commercial
**AMF - The Caterpillar** – Robert Sethi, Jamie O'Hara, Becky Porter, Steve Beck: Disney Prep and Landing - Wayne – David Foley, Mark Mitchell, Hidetaka Yosumi, Leo Sanchez Barbosa; Evian - Skating Babies – Jorge Montiel Meurer, Wayne Simmons, Jordi Onate, Emanuele Pavarotti; Pepsi - Penguin - "The Flight of the Penguin" – Andy Walker, Seth Gollub, James Dick, Spencer Leuders	**Kaiser Permanente - Emerald City** – Ben Walker, David Woodland, Kim Taylor, Ben Walsh
Outstanding Created Environment in a Broadcast Program or Commercial	Outstanding Compositing in a Broadcast Program or Commercial
**V - Pilot "Atrium and Ship Interiors"** – Chris Zapara, Chris Irving, David Morton, Trevor Adams: AMC Theatres/Coke - Magic Chairs – Rob Nederhorst, Dariush Derakhshani, Steve Cummings, Harry Michalakeas; Assassin's Creed: Lineage - Ep. 1 "Duke of Milan Assassination" – Mathieu Lalonde, Nadine Homier, Joseph Kasparlan, Christian Morin; FlashForward - Pilot "Freeway Overpass" – Steve Meyer, Colin Feist, Paul Ghezzo, Roger Kupelian	**CSI: Crime Scene Investigation - Ep 1001 Opening Sequence** – Derek Smith, Christina Spring, Steve Meyer, Zach Zaubi: Kerry Lowlow - "Mouse" Overall – Jake Mengers, Stephen Newbold, Kelly Bruce, Greg Howe-Davies; Pepsi - The Flight of the Penguin – Murray Butler, Ben Cronin, Andy Rowan-Robinson, Miyuki Shimamoto; Porsche - Family Tree – Tim Davies, Jeff Willette, Zach Tucker

=== Other categories ===
Outstanding Real Time Visuals in a Video Game	Outstanding Visual Effects in a Video Game Trailer
**Call of Duty: Modern Warfare 2 - Gulag Extraction** – Mark Rubin, Richard Kriegler, Robert Gaines, David Johnson: Fight Night Round 4 - Gameplay – Frank Vitz, Jenny Freeman, Jeff Atienza, Ben Ross; Need for Speed: Shift - World Sequence – Andreas Moll, Sven Moll, Dave Flynn, Robert Dibley; Uncharted 2: Among Thieves – Evan Wells, Christophe Balestra	**Halo 3: ODST - The Life** – Robert Moggach, Ryan Meredith, Jens Zalzala, Michael Pardee: DJ Hero – Diarmid Harrison-Murray, Sarah Hiddlestone, Marco Puig, Jamie Jackson; Mass Effect 2 – Tim Miller, Brandon Riza, Dave Wilson; Star Wars: The Old Republic – Tim Miller, Brandon Riza, Dave Wilson
Outstanding Visual Effects in a Special Venue Project	Outstanding Visual Effects in a Student Project
**Dance of the Dragons** – Derry Frost, Michael Morreale: Beyond All Boundaries – Daren Ulmer, Cedar Conner, Susan Beth Smith	**They Will Come to Town** – Thilo Ewers: The Full Moon Mystery – David Goubitz, Flip Buttinger, Jeffrey De Vore; Motherland – Hannes Appell; URS – Moritz Mayhofer
