= Richard Alonzo (make-up artist) =

Make-up artist

Richard Alonzo is a make-up artist. Known for his work on critically acclaimed films, The Sixth Sense (1999), A.I. Artificial Intelligence (2001), Iron Man (2008), Avatar (2009) and Star Trek Beyond (2016) for which he received a nomination for Academy Award for Best Makeup and Hairstyling at 89th Academy Awards with Joel Harlow.

== Filmography ==
- 2016 Star Trek Beyond (makeup effects artist)
- 2016 Deadpool (assistant make-up artist - as Richie Alonzo)
- 2013 Thor: The Dark World (special makeup effects artist)
- 2013 Oz the Great and Powerful (special makeup effects artist)
- 2012 Hitchcock (prosthetic art department)
- 2010 Alice in Wonderland (special make-up artist)
- 2009 Avatar (make-up artist: Los Angeles live action - as Richie Alonso)
- 2009 Terminator Salvation (key makeup effects artist)
- 2009 Grey Gardens (TV Movie) (key prosthetics technician - as Richie Alonzo)
- 2009 Star Trek (make-up artist)
- 2008 Iron Man (key make-up artist: second unit)
- 2007 Species: The Awakening (Video) (sculptor: JML Film Corporation - as Richie Alonzo)
- 2007 Pirates of the Caribbean: At World's End (additional make-up artist)
- 2006 Click (prosthetic make-up artist: Cinovation Studios)
- 2005 Doom (prosthetic make-up artist - as Ritchie Alonzo)
- 2005 Smile (key special makeup effects artist: The Stan Winston Studio)
- 2004 A Series of Unfortunate Events (prosthetic lab work: Count Olaf)
- 2002 Jack Pierce: The Man Behind the Monsters (Video documentary) (make-up artist)
- 2001 A.I. Artificial Intelligence (make-up artist: Flesh Fair only - as Richie Alonzo)
- 2001 Pearl Harbor (key makeup effects artist)
- 1999 The Sixth Sense (prosthetic make-up artist)
- 1995 Dead Man (prosthetic make-up artist)
- 1993 Romeo Is Bleeding (special makeup effects artist)
- 1992 Mr. Saturday Night (make-up artist)
- 1991 The Boneyard (key effects technician)
- 1989-1990 Monsters (TV Series) (special makeup effects artist - 2 episodes)
- 1989 Black Rain (prosthetic make-up artist)
- 1985 The Color Purple (make-up artist)
- 1981 The Nesting (special makeup effects artist)
