= Dan DeLeeuw =

Visual effects artist and director

- Occupation(s): Visual effects supervisor, Second Unit Director
- Years active: 1993–present

Dan DeLeeuw is a visual effects supervisor and second unit director best known for his works on Marvel Cinematic Universe films.

== Career ==
DeLeeuw began his career in 1993 at Dream Quest Images and started out as a CGI technical director before becoming a digital effects supervisor on such films including The Mask, Crimson Tide, The Rock, Armageddon, Mighty Joe Young and Bicentennial Man. In 1996, Dream Quest was purchased by The Walt Disney Company and in 1999, Dream Quest was subsequently renamed "The Secret Lab".

In 2001, DeLeeuw worked as a co-visual effects supervisor on Reign of Fire alongside fellow DQI & TSL colleague Richard R. Hoover. That same year, Secret Lab closed its doors and DeLeeuw worked at Rhythm and Hues Studios from 2002 to 2011 on films such as Garfield: The Movie, Serenity and the first two Night at the Museum films.

In 2012, DeLeeuw worked as a second unit visual effects supervisor on Marvel Studios' Iron Man 3, which was released in 2013 and later served as the overall visual effects supervisor on Captain America: The Winter Soldier, released in 2014. In 2015, he received his first Academy Award nomination for his work on the superhero spy thriller alongside Dan Sudick, Russell Earl and Bryan Grill.

In 2015, he collaborated once again with Marvel and the Russo brothers on Captain America: Civil War. The film was a commercial success grossing over $1.1 billion worldwide on a $250 million budget, becoming the highest-grossing film of 2016 and received positive reviews.

Through 2016–2019, DeLeeuw returned to collaborate with Marvel and the Russo's for their third & fourth collaborations on Avengers: Infinity War and Avengers: Endgame. Both films were shot back-to-back rather than simultaneously as originally planned, with filming for Infinity War taking place between January 23, 2017 & July 14, 2017 (reshoots took place between late 2017 & early 2018) and filming for Endgame taking place between August 10, 2017 & January 11, 2018. Approximately 890 hours of footage was shot between both films. Infinity War was made on a budget of $325–400 million and Endgame cost approximately $356–400 million, with the total budget of both films coming out to about $681–800 million. During the first set of reshoots for Endgame, which occurred between early-September 2018 & October 12, 2018, the production split into four units with the Russo brothers taking one each and the other two being supervised by DeLeeuw and one of the film's editors Jeffrey Ford, respectively. Endgame marked the first time DeLeeuw served as a second unit director.

Infinity War was released on April 27, 2018, and Endgame was released on April 26, 2019. Infinity War received praise for Josh Brolin's performance as Thanos, visual effects, action sequences, and emotional weight and became the fourth film & the first superhero film to gross over $2 billion worldwide, breaking numerous box office records, and becoming the highest-grossing film of 2018 and the fourth-highest-grossing film of all time both worldwide and in the United States and Canada. Endgame received praise for its direction, acting, musical score, action sequences, visual effects, & emotional weight, with critics lauding its culmination of the 22-film story and it grossed $2.798 billion worldwide, surpassing Infinity War's entire theatrical run in just eleven days and breaking numerous box office records, including becoming the highest-grossing film of all time from July 2019 until March 2021.

In 2019, Infinity War was nominated for the Academy Award for Best Visual Effects with DeLeeuw, production special effects supervisor Daniel Sudick, ILM senior supervisor Russell Earl & Digital Domain senior supervisor Kelly Port as the nominees and a year later in 2020, Endgame was nominated in the same category with DeLeeuw, Sudick, Earl & Weta lead supervisor Matt Aitken as the nominees.

Through 2019–2021, DeLeeuw marked his fifth & sixth collaboration with Marvel as a production side supervisor with the first season of the Disney+ series Loki alongside Bradley Parker and as a second unit director on Eternals with Stephane Ceretti as the film's overall supervisor of visual effects.

== Filmography ==
Key
†	Denotes films that have not yet been released

=== As a visual effects artist ===
Year	Title	Director	Roles	Other notes
1993	The Three Musketeers	Stephen Herek	Technical director: DQI	
1994	The Mask	Chuck Russell	CGI animator: DQI	
1994	The Swan Princess	Richard Rich	Technical director: DQI	
1995	Crimson Tide	Tony Scott	Digital effects supervisor: DQI	1st of 3 collaborations with producer Jerry Bruckheimer
1995	Dracula: Dead and Loving It	Mel Brooks	Digital effects supervisor: DQI	
1996	The Rock	Michael Bay	Digital effects supervisor: DQI	1st of 2 collaborations with Bay
1998	Deep Rising	Stephen Sommers	Digital effects supervisor: DQI	
1998	Armageddon	Michael Bay	Digital effects supervisor: Paris destruction sequence: DQI	
1998	Mighty Joe Young	Ron Underwood	Associate visual effects supervisor	
1999	Bicentennial Man	Chris Columbus	Digital effects supervisor: DQI	
2000	102 Dalmatians	Kevin Lima	Co-visual effects supervisor: TSL	
2002	Reign of Fire	Rob Bowman	Co-visual effects supervisor	1st of 2 collaborations with Bowman
2004	Garfield: The Movie	Peter Hewitt	Visual effects supervisor: R&H	
2005	Elektra	Rob Bowman	Production visual effects supervisor	
2005	Serenity	Joss Whedon	Visual effects supervisor: funeral sequence: R&H	
2005	The Skeleton Key	Iain Softley	Visual effects supervisor: R&H	
2006	Night at the Museum	Shawn Levy	Visual effects supervisor: R&H	1st of 2 collaborations with Levy
2009	Night at the Museum: Battle of the Smithsonian	Shawn Levy	Production visual effects supervisor	
2013	Iron Man 3	Shane Black	2nd unit visual effects supervisor	1st of 6 collaborations with Marvel Studios
2014	Captain America: The Winter Soldier	Anthony and Joe Russo	Production visual effects supervisor	1st of 4 collaborations with Anthony & Joe Russo Nominated - Academy Award for Best Visual Effects with Russell Earl, Bryan Grill and Dan Sudick
2016	Captain America: Civil War	Anthony and Joe Russo	Production visual effects supervisor	
2018	Avengers: Infinity War	Anthony and Joe Russo	Production visual effects supervisor	Shot back-to-back with Endgame Nominated - Academy Award for Best Visual Effects with Dan Sudick, Kelly Port and Russell Earl
2019	Avengers: Endgame	Anthony and Joe Russo	Production visual effects supervisor	Shot back-to-back with Infinity War. Also second unit director for additional photography Nominated - Academy Award for Best Visual Effects with Dan Sudick, Russell Earl and Matt Aitken
2021	Loki	Kate Herron	Production visual effects supervisor	With Bradley Parker

=== As second unit director ===
Year	Title	Director	Other notes
2019	Avengers: Endgame	Anthony and Joe Russo	Additional photography. Also production visual effects supervisor
2021	Eternals	Chloe Zhao	Visual effects supervised by Stephane Ceretti
2023	Ant-Man and the Wasp: Quantumania	Peyton Reed	Visual effects supervised by Jesse James Chisholm

=== As a director ===
Year	Title	Other notes
2023	Loki	Episode: Breaking Brad
