= Critics' Choice Movie Award for Best Visual Effects =

Award given by the Broadcast Film Critics Association

The Critics' Choice Movie Award for Best Visual Effects is one of the awards given to people working in the motion picture industry by the Broadcast Film Critics Association. It was first presented in 2009.

== Winners and nominees ==
=== 2000s ===
2009: Avatar

- 2012
- District 9
- The Lovely Bones
- Star Trek

=== 2010s ===
2010: Inception

- Alice in Wonderland
- Harry Potter and the Deathly Hallows – Part 1
- Tron: Legacy

2011: Rise of the Planet of the Apes

- Harry Potter and the Deathly Hallows – Part 2
- Hugo
- Super 8
- The Tree of Life

2012: Life of Pi

- The Avengers
- Cloud Atlas
- The Dark Knight Rises
- The Hobbit: An Unexpected Journey

2013: Gravity

- The Hobbit: The Desolation of Smaug
- Iron Man 3
- Pacific Rim
- Star Trek Into Darkness

2014: Dawn of the Planet of the Apes

- Edge of Tomorrow
- Guardians of the Galaxy
- The Hobbit: The Battle of the Five Armies
- Interstellar

2015: Mad Max: Fury Road

- Ex Machina
- Jurassic World
- The Martian
- The Revenant
- The Walk

2016: The Jungle Book

- Arrival
- Doctor Strange
- Fantastic Beasts and Where to Find Them
- A Monster Calls

2017: War for the Planet of the Apes

- Blade Runner 2049
- Dunkirk
- The Shape of Water
- Thor: Ragnarok
- Wonder Woman

2018: Black Panther

- Avengers: Infinity War
- First Man
- Mary Poppins Returns
- Mission: Impossible – Fallout
- Ready Player One

2019: Avengers: Endgame

- 1917
- Ad Astra
- The Aeronauts
- Ford v Ferrari
- The Irishman
- The Lion King

=== 2020s ===
2020: Tenet

- Greyhound
- The Invisible Man
- Mank
- The Midnight Sky
- Mulan
- Wonder Woman 1984

2021: Dune

- The Matrix Resurrections
- Nightmare Alley
- No Time to Die (Note: Won Best Action Movie at the 2nd Critics' Choice Super Awards)
- Shang-Chi and the Legend of the Ten Rings

2022: Avatar: The Way of Water

- The Batman
- Black Panther: Wakanda Forever
- Everything Everywhere All at Once
- RRR
- Top Gun: Maverick

2023: Oppenheimer

- The Creator
- Guardians of the Galaxy Vol. 3
- Mission: Impossible – Dead Reckoning Part One
- Poor Things
- Spider-Man: Across the Spider-Verse

2024: Dune: Part Two

- Better Man
- Gladiator II
- Kingdom of the Planet of the Apes
- The Substance
- Wicked

2025: Avatar: Fire and Ash

- F1
- Frankenstein
- Mission: Impossible – The Final Reckoning
- Sinners
- Superman

== See also ==
- Academy Award for Best Visual Effects
