= Paul Kavanagh (visual effects artist) =

British visual effects artist

- Occupation: Visual effects artist
- Years active: 1996–present

Paul Kavanagh is a British visual effects artist who was nominated at the 82nd Academy Awards in the category of Best Visual Effects for his work on Star Trek. His nomination was shared with Burt Dalton, Russell Earl and Roger Guyett. In 2016, he and his colleagues Chris Corbould, Roger Guyett and Neal Scanlan received the BAFTA-Award in the category of Best Special Visual Effects for their work on Star Wars: The Force Awakens. They were also nominated for an Academy Award, but lost to Ex Machina.

He has worked on 30 films to date since his start in 1996. He graduated from Bournemouth University in 1991 with a Master's degree in Computer Animation and Visualisation.

== Selected filmography ==
- Flubber (1997)
- The Lost World: Jurassic Park (1997)
- Star Wars: Episode I – The Phantom Menace (1999)
- Harry Potter and the Sorcerer's Stone (2001)
- Pearl Harbor (2001)
- Harry Potter and the Chamber of Secrets (2002)
- Star Wars: Episode II – Attack of the Clones (2002)
- Pirates of the Caribbean: The Curse of the Black Pearl (2003)
- Harry Potter and the Prisoner of Azkaban (2004)
- Star Wars: Episode III – Revenge of the Sith (2005)
- Pirates of the Caribbean: Dead Man's Chest (2006)
- Transformers (2007)
- Iron Man (2008)
- Avatar (2009)
- Star Trek (2009)
- Transformers: Revenge of the Fallen (2009)
- Super 8 (2011)
- G.I. Joe: Retaliation (2013)
- Star Trek Into Darkness (2013)
- Star Wars: The Force Awakens (2015)
