= Eileen Moran =

American visual effects producer and executive producer

Eileen Moran (January 23, 1952 – December 3, 2012) was an American visual effects producer and former executive producer at Weta Digital.

Moran was born in Queens, New York, on January 23, 1952, was raised Lindenhurst, New York, on Long Island. She attended the State University of New York at New Paltz with the initial goal of becoming an actor. Her classmates at SUNY New Paltz included actor John Turturro.

After graduating from SUNY New Paltz, Moran appeared in off-Broadway productions while living in New York City. Her career path changed when she was hired as a television commercial production assistant, which eventually led to her promotion to production manager.

Moran moved from New York City to Los Angeles, California where pursued an interest in music and worked for film director, Tony Scott. She was hired by Digital Domain, a special effects firm founded and owned by film director, James Cameron. Moran received industry buzz for her digital effects work on two Budweiser television commercials featuring ants, the Budweiser Frogs, and lizards.

In 2001, Moran left Digital Domain and took a position at Weta Digital, the digital effects company based in Wellington, New Zealand, which had been founded by Peter Jackson.

In 2005, Moran won her first Visual Effects Society Award for Outstanding Visual Effects in an Effects Driven Feature Motion Picture from the Visual Effects Society for her work on Peter Jackson's King Kong. Moran led the Weta Digital effects team which worked on James Cameron's Avatar, released in 2009. Moran and her team won the Visual Effects Society Award for Outstanding Visual Effects in an Effects Driven Feature Motion Picture for their work on Avatar in 2009. She also received a Visual Effects Society Award nomination for her work on Steven Spielberg's The Adventures of Tintin: The Secret of the Unicorn.

Her film credits included work on Fight Club, Lake Placid, and EDtv, all released in 1999; I, Robot in 2004; X-Men: The Last Stand in 2006; Eragon in 2006; Bridge to Terabithia, Fantastic 4: Rise of the Silver Surfer, 30 Days of Night, and The Water Horse all released in 2007; Jumper, The Chronicles of Narnia: Prince Caspian and The Day the Earth Stood Still, all released in 2008; District 9 and The Lovely Bones in 2009; The A-Team in 2010; Rise of the Planet of the Apes in 2011; and Prometheus in 2012.

Moran served as a co-producer for the 2012 Peter Jackson film, The Hobbit: An Unexpected Journey. She was unable to attend the film's premiere on November 28, 2012, in New Zealand due to poor health.

Eileen Moran died from cancer in Wellington, New Zealand on December 3, 2012, aged 60.
