= Critics' Choice Movie Award for Best Action Movie =

Award given by the Broadcast Film Critics Association

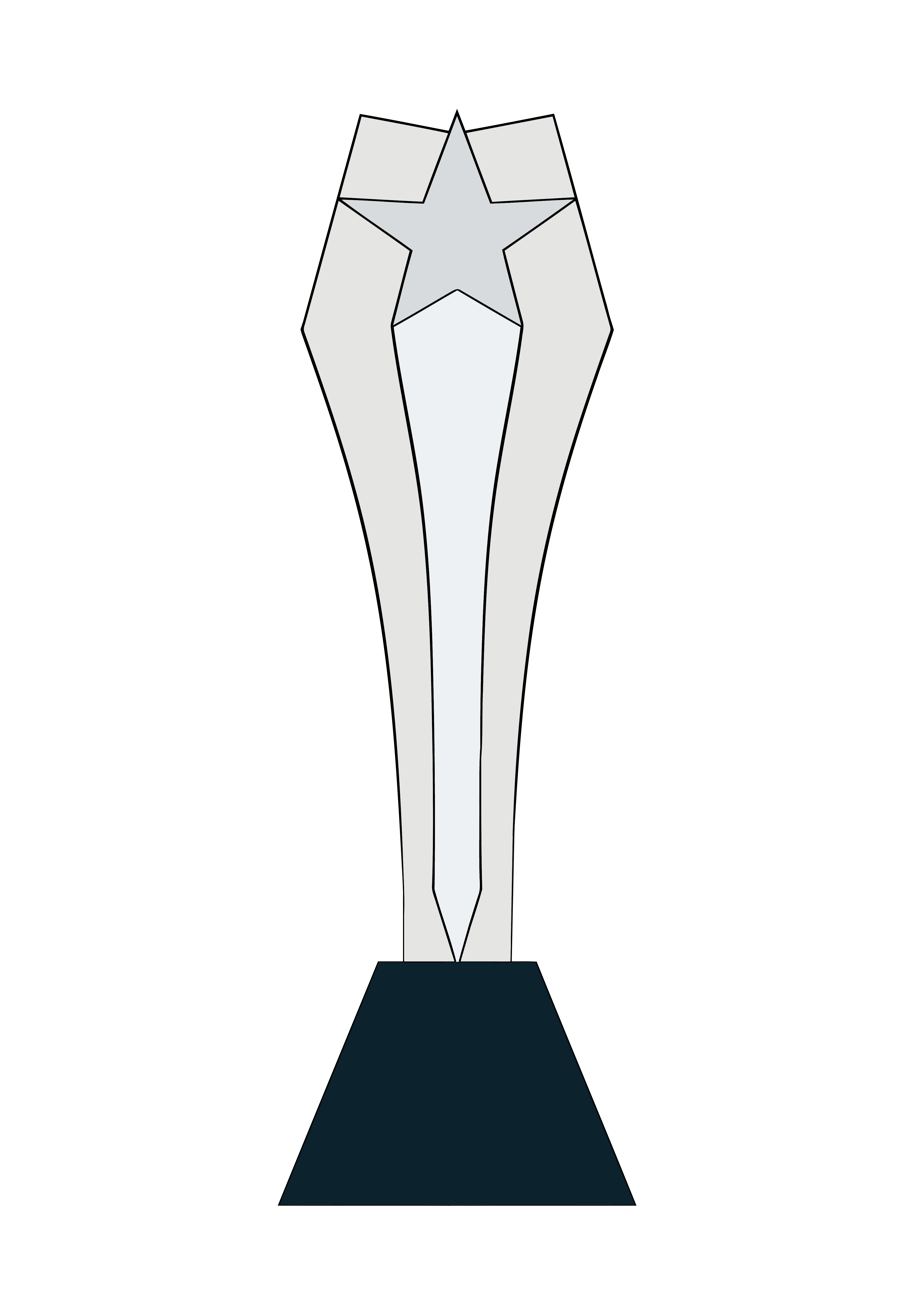
Critics' Choice icon

The Critics' Choice Movie Award for Best Action Movie is one of the awards given to people working in the motion picture industry by the Broadcast Film Critics Association. It was first given out in 2008.

== List of winners and nominees ==
=== 2000s ===
Year	Winner	Director(s)
2008	The Dark Knight	Christopher Nolan
2008	Indiana Jones and the Kingdom of the Crystal Skull	Steven Spielberg
2008	Iron Man	Jon Favreau
2008	Quantum of Solace	Marc Forster
2008	Wanted	Timur Bekmambetov
2009	Avatar	James Cameron
2009	District 9	Neill Blomkamp
2009	The Hurt Locker	Kathryn Bigelow
2009	Inglourious Basterds	Quentin Tarantino
2009	Star Trek	J. J. Abrams

=== 2010s ===
Year	Winner	Director(s)
2010	Inception	Christopher Nolan
2010	Kick-Ass	Matthew Vaughn
2010	Red	Robert Schwentke
2010	The Town	Ben Affleck
2010	Unstoppable	Tony Scott
2011	Drive	Nicolas Winding Refn
2011	Fast Five	Justin Lin
2011	Hanna	Joe Wright
2011	Rise of the Planet of the Apes	Rupert Wyatt
2011	Super 8	J. J. Abrams
2012	Skyfall	Sam Mendes
2012	The Avengers	Joss Whedon
2012	The Dark Knight Rises	Christopher Nolan
2012	Looper	Rian Johnson
2013	Lone Survivor	Peter Berg
2013	The Hunger Games: Catching Fire	Francis Lawrence
2013	Iron Man 3	Shane Black
2013	Rush	Ron Howard
2013	Star Trek Into Darkness	J. J. Abrams
2014	Guardians of the Galaxy	James Gunn
2014	American Sniper	Clint Eastwood
2014	Captain America: The Winter Soldier	Anthony and Joe Russo
2014	Edge of Tomorrow	Doug Liman
2014	Fury	David Ayer
2015	Mad Max: Fury Road	George Miller
2015	Furious 7	James Wan
2015	Jurassic World	Colin Trevorrow
2015	Mission: Impossible – Rogue Nation	Christopher McQuarrie
2015	Sicario	Denis Villeneuve
2016	Hacksaw Ridge	Mel Gibson
2016	Captain America: Civil War	Anthony and Joe Russo
2016	Deadpool	Tim Miller
2016	Doctor Strange	Scott Derrickson
2016	Jason Bourne	Paul Greengrass
2017	Wonder Woman	Patty Jenkins
2017	Baby Driver	Edgar Wright
2017	Logan	James Mangold
2017	Thor: Ragnarok	Taika Waititi
2017	War for the Planet of the Apes	Matt Reeves
2018	Mission: Impossible – Fallout	Christopher McQuarrie
2018	Avengers: Infinity War	Anthony and Joe Russo
2018	Black Panther	Ryan Coogler
2018	Deadpool 2	David Leitch
2018	Ready Player One	Steven Spielberg
2018	Widows	Steve McQueen
2019	Avengers: Endgame	Anthony and Joe Russo
2019	1917	Sam Mendes
2019	Ford v. Ferrari	James Mangold
2019	John Wick: Chapter 3 - Parabellum	Chad Stahelski
2019	Spider-Man: Far From Home	Jon Watts

=== 2020s ===
Year	Winner	Director(s)
2020	Da 5 Bloods	Spike Lee
2020	Bad Boys for Life	Adil El Arbi and Bilall Fallah
2020	Extraction	Sam Hargrave
2020	Greyhound	Aaron Schneider
2020	The Hunt	Craig Zobel
2020	Mulan	Niki Caro
2020	The Outpost	Rod Lurie
2020	Tenet	Christopher Nolan

== Multiple wins ==
- Christopher Nolan-2

== Multiple nominations (2 or more) ==
- Anthony and Joe Russo-4
- Christopher Nolan-4
- J. J. Abrams-3
- Sam Mendes-2
- James Mangold-2
- Christopher McQuarrie-2
- Steven Spielberg-2
