= Russell Earl =

Visual effects supervisor

- Born: Russell William Earl
- Occupation: Visual effects supervisor
- Years active: 1992–present

Russell William Earl is a visual effects supervisor. He has been nominated for five Academy Awards and two British Academy Film Awards, among other awards.

== Oscar history ==
All five of these are in the category of Best Visual Effects.

- 80th Academy Awards-Nominated for Transformers. Nomination shared with Scott Benza, Scott Farrar and John Knoll. Lost to The Golden Compass.
- 82nd Academy Awards-Nominated for Star Trek. Nomination shared with Burt Dalton, Roger Guyett and Paul Kavanagh. Lost to Avatar.
- 87th Academy Awards-Nominated for Captain America: The Winter Soldier. Nomination shared with Dan DeLeeuw, Bryan Grill and Dan Sudick. Lost to Interstellar.
- 91st Academy Awards-Nominated for Avengers: Infinity War. Nomination shared with Dan DeLeeuw, Kelly Port, Dan Sudick. Lost to First Man.
- 92nd Academy Awards-Nominated for Avengers: Endgame. Nomination shared with Dan DeLeeuw, Matt Aitken, Dan Sudick. Lost to 1917.

== Selected filmography ==
- Avengers: Endgame (2019)
- Avengers: Infinity War (2018)
- The Cloverfield Paradox (2018)
- Ant-Man (2015)
- Captain America: The Winter Soldier (2014)
- Red Tails (2012)
- Mission: Impossible – Ghost Protocol (2011)
- Super 8 (2011)
- Star Trek (2009)
- Transformers (2007)
- Mission: Impossible III (2006)
- Star Wars: Episode III – Revenge of the Sith (2005)
- Pirates of the Caribbean: The Curse of the Black Pearl (2003)
- Men in Black II (2002)
- Harry Potter and the Sorcerer's Stone (2001)
- Pearl Harbor (2001)
- Star Wars: Episode I – The Phantom Menace (1999)
- Deep Impact (1998)
- Forrest Gump (1994)
- Batman Returns (1992)
- Patriot Games (1992)
