= Mindy Hall =

- Education: San Diego State University
- Occupation: Make-up artist
- Awards: 2009 Academy Award for Best Makeup and Hairstyling

Mindy Hall is a makeup artist who has worked on films such as Teenage Mutant Ninja Turtles (2014) and Wall Street: Money Never Sleeps (2010). She also worked on Star Trek (2009), where she was involved in the redesign work on the Romulan race. For her work on that film, she won an Academy Award for Best Makeup.

== Career ==
Hall decided to pursue a career in Hollywood makeup at the age of 17. She attended San Diego State University, but she dropped out and instead joined the apprenticeship programme for makeup at the San Francisco Opera. Following her completion of the course, she worked with several regional opera companies to do makeup as well as hairstyling and wig construction.

Mindy is co-author with Gretchen Davis of The Makeup Artist Handbook published by Focal Press. She worked on a number of films, including Teenage Mutant Ninja Turtles, P.S. I Love You and Wall Street: Money Never Sleeps. As part of her work on 2009's Star Trek, she was involved in the redesign of the Romulan race seen in the film. She was the department head of makeup on the film, where she led a team of over forty makeup artists as well as Joel Harlow and Barney Burman who designed the aliens seen in the movie.

=== Awards ===
The make-up team working on Star Trek won an Oscar at the 82nd Academy Awards. It was the trio's first nomination and was the first Oscar to have been awarded to any film in the franchise. They repeated their success at the 36th Saturn Awards, even though the event was dominated by the success of James Cameron's Avatar. In 2011, she was nominated for an Emmy Award for outstanding makeup, mini-series or movies as the head of the team that worked on the HBO television series Cinema Verite.
