= Dan Sudick =

Visual effects supervisor

Dan Sudick is a special effects supervisor. Sudick and his fellow visual effects artists were nominated for an Academy Award for Best Visual Effects for Master and Commander: The Far Side of the World, War of the Worlds, Iron Man, Iron Man 2, The Avengers, Iron Man 3, Captain America: The Winter Soldier, Guardians of the Galaxy Vol. 2, Avengers: Infinity War, Avengers: Endgame, Free Guy, Spider-Man: No Way Home and Black Panther: Wakanda Forever.

== Filmography ==
=== Films ===
Year	Title	Director(s)	Notes
1991	Dutch	Peter Faiman	—N/a
1991	The Fisher King	Terry Gilliam	—N/a
1992	Memoirs of an Invisible Man	John Carpenter	—N/a
1992	Home Alone 2: Lost in New York	Chris Columbus	—N/a
1994	Wolf	Mike Nichols	—N/a
1995	I.Q.	Fred Schepisi	—N/a
1995	Jumanji	Joe Johnston	—N/a
1996	The Birdcage	Mike Nichols	—N/a
1996	Executive Decision	Stuart Baird	—N/a
1997	Red Corner	Jon Avnet	—N/a
1997	Switchback	Jeb Stuart	—N/a
1998	The Negotiator	F. Gary Gray	—N/a
1999	Life	Ted Demme	—N/a
1999	Body Shots	Michael Cristofer	—N/a
2000	Mission: Impossible 2	John Woo	—N/a
2000	Nutty Professor II: The Klumps	Peter Segal	—N/a
2002	Dragonfly	Tom Shadyac	—N/a
2003	National Security	Dennis Dugan	—N/a
2003	Master and Commander: The Far Side of the World	Peter Weir	—N/a
2003	The Haunted Mansion	Rob Minkoff	—N/a
2004	Cellular	David R. Ellis	—N/a
2005	War of the Worlds	Steven Spielberg	—N/a
2005	Serenity	Joss Whedon	—N/a
2006	Mission: Impossible III	J. J. Abrams	—N/a
2007	Evan Almighty	Tom Shadyac	—N/a
2008	Iron Man	Jon Favreau	—N/a
2008	Indiana Jones and the Kingdom of the Crystal Skull	Steven Spielberg	—N/a
2009	G.I. Joe: The Rise of Cobra	Stephen Sommers	—N/a
2009	Couples Retreat	Peter Billingsley	—N/a
2010	Iron Man 2	Jon Favreau	—N/a
2011	Thor	Kenneth Branagh	—N/a
2011	Cowboys & Aliens	Jon Favreau	—N/a
2012	The Avengers	Joss Whedon	—N/a
2012	Item 47	Louis D'Esposito	Short film
2013	Iron Man 3	Shane Black	—N/a
2013	Agent Carter	Louis D'Esposito	Short film
2014	Captain America: The Winter Soldier	Anthony Russo; Joe Russo	—N/a
2015	Ant-Man	Peyton Reed	—N/a
2015	Furious 7	James Wan	—N/a
2016	Passengers	Morten Tyldum	—N/a
2017	Guardians of the Galaxy Vol. 2	James Gunn	—N/a
2017	Spider-Man: Homecoming	Jon Watts	—N/a
2018	Black Panther	Ryan Coogler	—N/a
2018	Avengers: Infinity War	Anthony Russo; Joe Russo	—N/a
2018	Ant-Man and the Wasp	Peyton Reed	—N/a
2018	Bad Times at the El Royale	Drew Goddard	—N/a
2019	Captain Marvel	Anna Boden; Ryan Fleck	—N/a
2019	Avengers: Endgame	Anthony Russo; Joe Russo	—N/a
2020	A Quiet Place Part II	John Krasinski	—N/a
2021	Free Guy	Shawn Levy	—N/a
2021	The Suicide Squad	James Gunn	—N/a
2021	Spider-Man: No Way Home	Jon Watts	—N/a
2022	Black Panther: Wakanda Forever	Ryan Coogler	—N/a

=== Television ===
Year	Title	Notes
2021	WandaVision	—N/a
2021	The Falcon and the Winter Soldier	—N/a
2022	She Hulk	—N/a
