= Barney Burman =

American makeup artist

- Occupation: Make-up artist
- Years active: 1984–present
- Parent(s): Thomas R. Burman (father); Sandra Burman (mother)
- Family: Ellis Burman Jr. (Uncle); Ellis Burman the III (cousin); Rob Burman (brother); Ellis Burman Sr.(grandfather)
- Awards: 2009 Academy Award for Best Makeup and Hairstyling

Barney Burman is an American makeup artist, director, and character actor. He was part of the team that won an Academy Award in 2009 for Best Make-up, on the film Star Trek.

== Career ==
After being introduced to Hollywood make-up through his parents, Burman spent the first part of his life attempting to pursue a career in acting. He used make-up jobs to fund this pursuit during this time. His first professional job was in 1984 as part of the make-up team behind Star Trek III: The Search for Spock, he returned to the franchise on Star Trek VI: The Undiscovered Country. At the age of 30, he decided to pursue make-up full-time, and gained union accreditation after working on the 1995 film Powder.

Throughout his career, Burman contributed to special make-up effects and character transformations for major studio films and television series, including Dawn of the Dead (2004), Tom Cruise's character transformation as Les Grossman in Tropic Thunder (2008), and Jim Carrey's series Kidding.

In 2009, he worked on the rebooted Star Trek alongside Joel Harlow and Mindy Hall. He described the film as a significant challenge, saying "It was the biggest film I had done to date and it was about six months of sleeping four hours a night and just keep going and going and going and it took so much of my focus – just a crazy amount of energy that it took to get that done." It was the third time he had worked with director J. J. Abrams following Mission: Impossible III and the television movie Anatomy of Hope.

He has subsequently led the make-up team that works on NBC's television series Grimm. He has praised the variety that the show has given his team, saying "It’s creating over and over again each episode. Often we've had situations where we've had to make a full dead body in five days or we did an episode with some Bigfoot characters and we had four days to get our first one done." Burman owns B2FX, Inc, a make-up studio which operates out of Los Angeles and New Mexico.

Burman expanded his creative endeavors into film directing and writing. He made his feature directorial debut with the indie horror film Wild Boar, for which he also wrote the screenplay. Additionally, he authored a novel titled Radio Waves.

=== Awards ===
The make-up team working on 2009's Star Trek won an Oscar at the 82nd Academy Awards. This was the first Oscar to have been awarded to any film in the franchise.

== Personal life ==
Barney's father, Thomas R. Burman and his wife Bari Dreiband-Burman, were nominated for best make-up for the film Scrooged. His grandfather, Ellis Burman Sr., was considered to be a pioneer in film make-up, having worked on the original Twilight Zone television series and the 1941 film The Wolf Man.
