= Joel Harlow =

American make-up artist

- Born: February 2, 1968 (age 58); Grand Forks, North Dakota, U.S.
- Education: School of Visual Arts
- Occupation: Make-up artist
- Years active: 1987–present

Joel Harlow (born February 2, 1968) is an American make-up artist. He works steadily in many high-profile films.

Harlow won an Academy Award for his work in the successful film Star Trek (2009), subsequently receiving another three nominations for The Lone Ranger (2013), Star Trek Beyond (2016), and Black Panther: Wakanda Forever (2022).

== Life and career ==
Born and raised in Grand Forks, North Dakota, Harlow was inspired to work in film-making after seeing the 1933 film King Kong as a child. He later explained that he spent "hours in the basement creating things and I knew I wanted to make characters. I just didn't know what it was at the time, that makeup was the way to do that." After graduating from high school he moved to New York City to attend the School of Visual Arts, where he majored in animation.

Harlow worked together with actor Johnny Depp on several films, such as Pirates of the Caribbean: Dead Man's Chest and Alice in Wonderland. While they were both working on The Rum Diary in Puerto Rico, they found a photograph of a Native American which they developed into the makeup design used on Tonto as played by Depp in the 2013 film The Lone Ranger. They had also used it to encourage Walt Disney Studios into producing the film, as at the time that they discovered the image, the film was close to being dropped. In the final design of Tonto, some eight prosthetics were created by Harlow for Depp and eighteen overlapping prosthetics when the actor played the older version of the character.

=== Awards ===
In 2008, Harlow was nominated with Debbie Zoller, Brian Penikas, and Jake Garber for an Emmy Award for Prosthetic Makeup For A Series, Miniseries, Movie Or A Special for their work on the Mad Men season one episode "Nixon vs. Kennedy".

He was a member of the team that won the Academy Award in 2009 for Star Trek, which he shared with Barney Burman and Mindy Hall. This was the first Oscar to have been awarded to any film in the franchise. He was once again nominated for an Academy Award for his work on The Lone Ranger alongside hairstylist Gloria Pasqua-Casny. He was the only person in the category who had previously been nominated. The award went to Adruitha Lee and Robin Mathews for Dallas Buyers Club.

Alongside Camille Friend, Harlow received his most recent Academy Award nomination in 2023 for his work on Black Panther: Wakanda Forever.
