= Burt Dalton =

American visual effects supervisor

Burt Dalton is an American visual effects supervisor. Dalton and his fellow visual effects artists are nominated for an Academy Award for Best Visual Effects for the 2013 film Star Trek Into Darkness. He has won 1 Oscar for The Curious Case of Benjamin Button along with 3 other nominations.

The Oscar he won was shared with Eric Barba, Craig Barron and Steve Preeg.
