= Roger Guyett =

English visual effects supervisor

- Born: United Kingdom
- Occupation: Visual effects supervisor
- Years active: 1993-present

Roger Guyett is an English visual effects supervisor and second unit director. Guyett and his fellow visual effects artists were nominated for an Academy Award for Best Visual Effects for the 2015 film Star Wars: The Force Awakens.

He started his career working in London doing Computer Animation work on commercials, pop videos and TV idents in the mid-1980s. Following a move to the United States in 1993, he began working on various film projects. He initially worked at Pacific Data Images (PDI - the largest Computer Graphics company at that time, known for the Michael Jackson video 'Black or White') before moving in 1995 to Industrial Light & Magic – one of the longest-standing and most successful visual effects companies in the world. During his 27-year tenure at ILM he has worked on over 30 films.

Guyett has been nominated for six Academy Awards: he was also nominated for Ready Player One, Star Trek Into Darkness, Star Trek, Star Wars: The Rise of Skywalker and Harry Potter and the Prisoner of Azkaban. Additionally, he has won two British Academy Film Awards for Best Special Visual Effects and been nominated a further six times.

Guyett returned to supervise the visual effects for the final/episodic film of the Skywalker Saga, Star Wars: The Rise of Skywalker, which was released on 20 December 2019.
