= List of accolades received by Marvel Cinematic Universe films =

Accolades received by Marvel Cinematic Universe films
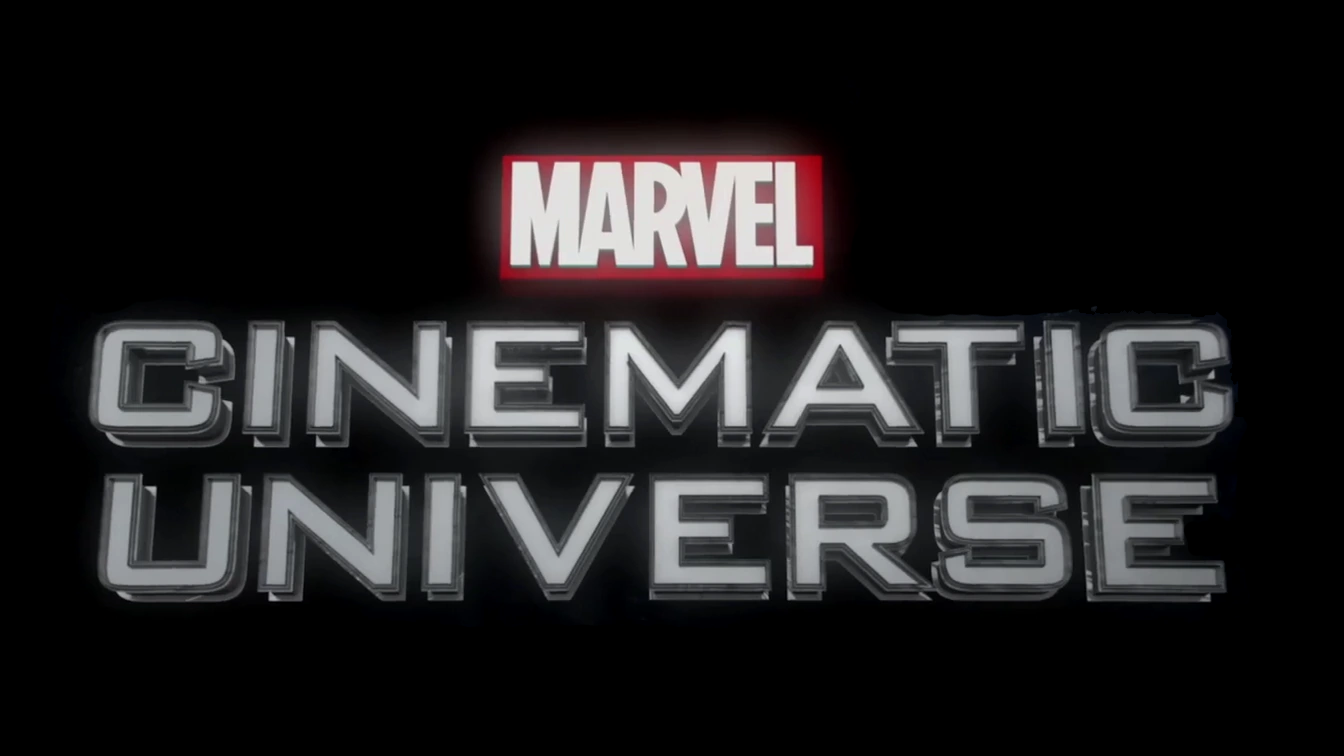
- Marvel Cinematic Universe intertitle from Marvel Studios: Assembling a Universe (2014)
Awards and nominations
Award	Wins	Nominations
Academy Awards	4	27
Golden Globe Awards	1	7
BAFTA Awards	1	13
Grammy Awards	2	15
Saturn Awards	45	192
Hugo Awards	2	14
MTV Movie & TV Awards	15	64
Visual Effects Society Awards	10	54

Totals (Note: Certain award groups do not simply award one winner. They acknowledge several different recipients, have runners-up, and have third place. Since this is a specific recognition and is different from losing an award, runner-up mentions are considered wins in this award tally. For simplification and to avoid errors, each award in this list has been presumed to have had a prior nomination.)
- Wins: 80
- Nominations: 306

The Marvel Cinematic Universe (MCU) is an American media franchise and shared universe centered on a series of superhero films, independently produced by Marvel Studios and based on characters that appear in American comic books published by Marvel Comics. The franchise also includes comic books, short films, television series, and digital series. The shared universe, much like the original Marvel Universe in comic books, was established by crossing over common plot elements, settings, cast, and characters.

Of the various science fiction awards, the Saturn Awards is the most frequent award for the Marvel Cinematic Universe; in 16 years, MCU films have been nominated for 192 Saturn Awards (winning 45): 8 nominations for Iron Man (winning three), 1 nomination for The Incredible Hulk, 4 nominations for Iron Man 2, 4 nominations for Thor (winning one), 7 nominations for Captain America: The First Avenger, 6 nominations for The Avengers (winning four), 5 nominations for Iron Man 3 (winning three), 5 nominations for Thor: The Dark World, 11 nominations for Captain America: The Winter Soldier, 9 nominations for Guardians of the Galaxy (winning four), 4 nominations for Avengers: Age of Ultron (winning one), 6 nominations for Ant-Man (winning one), 8 nominations for Captain America: Civil War (winning one), 10 nominations for Doctor Strange (winning two), 4 nominations for Guardians of the Galaxy Vol. 2 (winning one), 4 nominations for Spider-Man: Homecoming (winning one), 2 nominations for Thor: Ragnarok, 14 nominations for Black Panther (winning five), 2 nominations for Avengers: Infinity War (winning one), 3 nominations for Captain Marvel, 14 nominations for Avengers: Endgame (winning six), 4 nominations for Spider-Man: Far From Home (winning two), 7 nominations for Shang-Chi and the Legend of the Ten Rings (winning one), 1 nomination for Eternals, 9 nominations for Spider-Man: No Way Home (winning one), 4 nominations for Doctor Strange in the Multiverse of Madness (winning one), 3 nominations for Thor: Love and Thunder, 3 nominations for Black Panther: Wakanda Forever, 1 nomination for Ant-Man and the Wasp: Quantumania, 7 nominations for Guardians of the Galaxy Vol. 3 (winning one), 10 nominations for Deadpool & Wolverine (winning three), and 12 nominations for The Fantastic Four: First Steps (winning two). It also holds the record for most nominations (and second for most wins after Star Wars) for Saturn Awards for a film franchise.

The Marvel Cinematic Universe is also distinguished by the fact that Black Panther was the first superhero film and MCU film to be nominated for an Academy Award for Best Picture and a Golden Globe Awards for Best Motion Picture. It is also the first MCU film to win an Academy Award. In addition, Iron Man was inducted into the National Film Registry in 2022.

MCU films have also been nominated for 14 Hugo Awards, winning two for The Avengers and Guardians of the Galaxy.

== Academy Awards ==
Year	Category	Film	Nominee(s)	Result	Ref.
2009	Best Sound Editing	Iron Man	Frank Eulner and Christopher Boyes	Nominated	
2009	Best Visual Effects	Iron Man	John Nelson, Ben Snow, Dan Sudick and Shane Mahan	Nominated	
2011	Best Visual Effects	Iron Man 2	Janek Sirrs, Ben Snow, Ged Wright and Dan Sudick	Nominated	
2013	Best Visual Effects	The Avengers	Janek Sirrs, Jeff White, Guy Williams and Dan Sudick	Nominated	
2014	Best Visual Effects	Iron Man 3	Christopher Townsend, Guy Williams, Erik Nash and Dan Sudick	Nominated	
2015	Best Visual Effects	Captain America: The Winter Soldier	Dan DeLeeuw, Russell Earl, Bryan Grill and Dan Sudick	Nominated	
2015	Best Makeup and Hairstyling	Guardians of the Galaxy	Elizabeth Yianni-Georgiou and David White	Nominated	
2015	Best Visual Effects	Guardians of the Galaxy	Stephane Ceretti, Nicolas Aithadi, Jonathan Fawkner and Paul Corbould	Nominated	
2017	Best Visual Effects	Doctor Strange	Stephane Ceretti, Richard Bluff, Vincent Cirelli and Paul Corbould	Nominated	
2018	Best Visual Effects	Guardians of the Galaxy Vol. 2	Christopher Townsend, Guy Williams, Jonathan Fawkner and Dan Sudick	Nominated	
2019	Best Picture	Black Panther	Kevin Feige	Nominated	
2019	Best Costume Design	Black Panther	Ruth Carter	Won	
2019	Best Original Score	Black Panther	Ludwig Göransson	Won	
2019	Best Original Song	Black Panther	Kendrick Lamar, Sounwave & Anthony Tiffith (music); Lamar, SZA & Tiffith (lyrics) for "All the Stars"	Nominated	
2019	Best Production Design	Black Panther	Production Design: Hannah Beachler; Set Decoration: Jay Hart	Won	
2019	Best Sound Editing	Black Panther	Benjamin A. Burtt and Steve Boeddeker	Nominated	
2019	Best Sound Mixing	Black Panther	Steve Boeddeker, Brandon Proctor and Peter J. Devlin	Nominated	
2019	Best Visual Effects	Avengers: Infinity War	Dan DeLeeuw, Kelly Port, Russell Earl and Dan Sudick	Nominated	
2020	Best Visual Effects	Avengers: Endgame	Dan DeLeeuw, Russell Earl, Matt Aitken and Dan Sudick	Nominated	
2022	Best Visual Effects	Shang-Chi and the Legend of the Ten Rings	Christopher Townsend, Joe Farrell, Sean Noel Walker and Dan Oliver	Nominated	
2022	Best Visual Effects	Spider-Man: No Way Home	Kelly Port, Chris Waegner, Scott Edelstein and Dan Sudick	Nominated	
2023	Best Supporting Actress	Black Panther: Wakanda Forever	Angela Bassett	Nominated	
2023	Best Costume Design	Black Panther: Wakanda Forever	Ruth Carter	Won	
2023	Best Makeup and Hairstyling	Black Panther: Wakanda Forever	Camille Friend and Joel Harlow	Nominated	
2023	Best Original Song	Black Panther: Wakanda Forever	Ryan Coogler, Ludwig Göransson, Rihanna & Tems (music); Coogler & Tems (lyrics) for "Lift Me Up"	Nominated	
2023	Best Visual Effects	Black Panther: Wakanda Forever	Geoffrey Baumann, Craig Hammack, R. Christopher White and Dan Sudick	Nominated	
2024	Best Visual Effects	Guardians of the Galaxy Vol. 3	Stephane Ceretti, Alexis Wajsbrot, Guy Williams and Theo Bialek	Nominated	

== Golden Globe Awards ==
Year	Category	Film	Nominee(s)	Result	Ref.
2019	Best Motion Picture – Drama	Black Panther	Kevin Feige	Nominated	
2019	Best Original Score	Black Panther	Ludwig Göransson	Nominated	
2019	Best Original Song	Black Panther	Kendrick Lamar, Sounwave & Anthony Tiffith (music); Lamar, SZA & Tiffith (lyrics) for "All the Stars"	Nominated	
2023	Best Supporting Actress – Motion Picture	Black Panther: Wakanda Forever	Angela Bassett	Won	
2023	Best Original Song	Black Panther: Wakanda Forever	Ryan Coogler, Ludwig Göransson, Rihanna & Tems (music); Coogler & Tems (lyrics) for "Lift Me Up"	Nominated	
2024	Cinematic and Box Office Achievement	Guardians of the Galaxy Vol. 3	Kevin Feige	Nominated	
2025	Cinematic and Box Office Achievement	Deadpool & Wolverine	Kevin Feige, Lauren Shuler Donner, Ryan Reynolds, Shawn Levy	Nominated	

== BAFTA Awards ==
Year	Category	Film	Nominee(s)	Result	Ref.
2009	Best Special Visual Effects	Iron Man	Shane Patrick Mahan, John Nelson and Ben Snow	Nominated	
2013	Best Special Visual Effects	The Avengers	Janek Sirrs, Jeff White, Guy Williams and Dan Sudick	Nominated	
2015	Best Makeup and Hair	Guardians of the Galaxy	Elizabeth Yianni-Georgiou and David White	Nominated	
2015	Best Special Visual Effects	Guardians of the Galaxy	Stephane Ceretti, Paul Corbould, Jonathan Fawkner and Nicolas Aithadi	Nominated	
2016	Best Special Visual Effects	Ant-Man	Jake Morrison, Greg Steele, Dan Sudick and Alex Wuttke	Nominated	
2017	Best Makeup and Hair	Doctor Strange	Jeremy Woodhead	Nominated	
2017	Best Production Design	Doctor Strange	Charles Wood and John Bush	Nominated	
2017	Best Special Visual Effects	Doctor Strange	Richard Bluff, Stephane Ceretti, Paul Corbould and Jonathan Fawkner	Nominated	
2019	Best Special Visual Effects	Black Panther	Geoffrey Baumann, Jesse James Chisholm, Craig Hammack and Dan Sudick	Won	
2019	Best Special Visual Effects	Avengers: Infinity War	Dan DeLeeuw, Russell Earl, Kelly Port and Dan Sudick	Nominated	
2020	Best Special Visual Effects	Avengers: Endgame	Matt Aitken, Dan DeLeeuw, Russell Earl and Dan Sudick	Nominated	
2023	Best Actress in a Supporting Role	Black Panther: Wakanda Forever	Angela Bassett	Nominated	
2024	Best Special Visual Effects	Guardians of the Galaxy Vol. 3	Theo Bialek, Stephane Ceretti, Alexis Wajsbrot and Guy Williams	Nominated	

== Grammy Awards ==
Year	Category	Film	Nominee(s)	Result	Ref.
2009	Best Score Soundtrack Album for a Motion Picture, Television or Other Visual Media	Iron Man	Ramin Djawadi	Nominated	
2015	Best Compilation Soundtrack for Visual Media	Guardians of the Galaxy	James Gunn	Nominated	
2018	Best Compilation Soundtrack for Visual Media	Guardians of the Galaxy Vol. 2	James Gunn	Nominated	
2019	Album of the Year	Black Panther	Kendrick Lamar, featured artist; Kendrick Duckworth & Sounwave, producers; Matt Schaeffer, engineer/mixer; Kendrick Duckworth & Mark Spears, songwriters; Mike Bozzi, mastering engineer	Nominated	
2019	Song of the Year	Black Panther	Kendrick Duckworth, Solána Rowe, Al Shuckburgh, Mark Spears & Anthony Tiffith, songwriters (Kendrick Lamar & SZA)	Nominated	
2019	Record of the Year	Black Panther	Kendrick Lamar & SZA	Nominated	
2019	Best Rap/Sung Performance	Black Panther	Kendrick Lamar & SZA	Nominated	
2019	Best Song Written for Visual Media	Black Panther	Kendrick Duckworth, Solána Rowe, Alexander William Shuckburgh, Mark Anthony Spears & Anthony Tiffith, songwriters (Kendrick Lamar & SZA)	Nominated	
2019	Best Rap Performance	Black Panther	Kendrick Lamar, Jay Rock, Future & James Blake	Won	
2019	Best Rap Song	Black Panther	Kendrick Duckworth, Samuel Gloade, James Litherland, Johnny McKinzie, Axel Morgan, Mark Spears, Travis Walton, Nayvadius Wilburn & Michael Williams II, songwriters (Kendrick Lamar, Jay Rock, Future & James Blake)	Nominated	
2019	Best Score Soundtrack for Visual Media	Black Panther	Ludwig Göransson	Won	
2019	Best Instrumental Composition	Avengers: Infinity War	Alan Silvestri	Nominated	
2020	Best Score Soundtrack for Visual Media	Avengers: Endgame	Alan Silvestri	Nominated	
2023	Best Arrangement, Instrumental or A Cappella	Doctor Strange in the Multiverse of Madness	Danny Elfman	Nominated	
2025	Best Compilation Soundtrack for Visual Media	Deadpool & Wolverine	Dave Jordan, Shawn Levy & Ryan Reynolds, compilation producers; Dave Jordan, music supervisor	Nominated	

== Saturn Awards ==
Year	Category	Film	Nominee(s)	Result	Ref.
2009	Best Science Fiction Film	Iron Man	Kevin Feige	Won	
2009	Best Film Director	Iron Man	Jon Favreau	Won	
2009	Best Actor in a Film	Iron Man	Robert Downey Jr.	Won	
2009	Best Actress in a Film	Iron Man	Gwyneth Paltrow	Nominated	
2009	Best Supporting Actor in a Film	Iron Man	Jeff Bridges	Nominated	
2009	Best Film Writing	Iron Man	Mark Fergus, Hawk Ostby, Art Marcum and Matt Holloway	Nominated	
2009	Best Music	Iron Man	Ramin Djawadi	Nominated	
2009	Best Film Special Effects	Iron Man	John Nelson, Ben Snow, Daniel Sudick and Shane Mahan	Nominated	
2009	Best Science Fiction Film	The Incredible Hulk	Avi Arad, Gale Anne Hurd and Kevin Feige	Nominated	
2011	Best Science Fiction Film	Iron Man 2	Kevin Feige	Nominated	
2011	Best Actor in a Film	Iron Man 2	Robert Downey Jr.	Nominated	
2011	Best Supporting Actress in a Film	Iron Man 2	Scarlett Johansson	Nominated	
2011	Best Film Special Effects	Iron Man 2	Ged Wright, Janek Sirrs, Ben Snow and Dan Sudick	Nominated	
2012	Best Fantasy Film	Thor	Kevin Feige	Nominated	
2012	Best Supporting Actor in a Film	Thor	Tom Hiddleston	Nominated	
2012	Best Film Production Design	Thor	Bo Welch	Nominated	
2012	Best Film Costume	Thor	Alexandra Byrne	Won	
2012	Best Science Fiction Film	Captain America: The First Avenger	Kevin Feige	Nominated	
2012	Best Actor in a Film	Captain America: The First Avenger	Chris Evans	Nominated	
2012	Best Supporting Actor in a Film	Captain America: The First Avenger	Stanley Tucci	Nominated	
2012	Best Music	Captain America: The First Avenger	Alan Silvestri	Nominated	
2012	Best Film Production Design	Captain America: The First Avenger	Rick Heinrichs	Nominated	
2012	Best Film Costume	Captain America: The First Avenger	Anna B. Sheppard	Nominated	
2012	Best Film Special Effects	Captain America: The First Avenger	Mark Soper, Christopher Townsend and Paul Corbould	Nominated	
2013	Best Science Fiction Film	The Avengers	Kevin Feige	Won	
2013	Best Film Director	The Avengers	Joss Whedon	Won	
2013	Best Supporting Actor in a Film	The Avengers	Clark Gregg	Won	
2013	Best Film Writing	The Avengers	Joss Whedon	Nominated	
2013	Best Film Editing	The Avengers	Jeffrey Ford and Lisa Lassek	Nominated	
2013	Best Film Special Effects	The Avengers	Janek Sirrs, Jeff White, Guy Williams and Dan Sudick	Won	
2014	Best Comic-to-Film Motion Picture	Iron Man 3	Kevin Feige	Won	
2014	Best Actor in a Film	Iron Man 3	Robert Downey Jr.	Won	
2014	Best Supporting Actor in a Film	Iron Man 3	Ben Kingsley	Won	
2014	Best Performance by a Younger Actor in a Film	Iron Man 3	Ty Simpkins	Nominated	
2014	Best Music	Iron Man 3	Brian Tyler	Nominated	
2014	Best Comic-to-Film Motion Picture	Thor: The Dark World	Kevin Feige	Nominated	
2014	Best Supporting Actor in a Film	Thor: The Dark World	Tom Hiddleston	Nominated	
2014	Best Film Costume	Thor: The Dark World	Wendy Partridge	Nominated	
2014	Best Film Make-up	Thor: The Dark World	Karen Cohen, David White and Elizabeth Yianni-Georgiou	Nominated	
2014	Best Film Special Effects	Thor: The Dark World	Jake Morrison, Paul Corbould and Mark Breakspear	Nominated	
2015	Best Comic-to-Film Motion Picture	Captain America: The Winter Soldier	Kevin Feige	Nominated	
2015	Best Film Director	Captain America: The Winter Soldier	Joe Russo and Anthony Russo	Nominated	
2015	Best Film Writing	Captain America: The Winter Soldier	Christopher Markus and Stephen McFeely	Nominated	
2015	Best Actor in a Film	Captain America: The Winter Soldier	Chris Evans	Nominated	
2015	Best Supporting Actor in a Film	Captain America: The Winter Soldier	Anthony Mackie	Nominated	
2015	Best Supporting Actor in a Film	Captain America: The Winter Soldier	Samuel L. Jackson	Nominated	
2015	Best Supporting Actress in a Film	Captain America: The Winter Soldier	Scarlett Johansson	Nominated	
2015	Best Music	Captain America: The Winter Soldier	Henry Jackman	Nominated	
2015	Best Film Editing	Captain America: The Winter Soldier	Jeffrey Ford and Matthew Schmidt	Nominated	
2015	Best Film Production Design	Captain America: The Winter Soldier	Peter Wenham	Nominated	
2015	Best Film Special Effects	Captain America: The Winter Soldier	Dan DeLeeuw, Russell Earl, Bryan Grill and Dan Sudick	Nominated	
2015	Best Comic-to-Film Motion Picture	Guardians of the Galaxy	Kevin Feige	Won	
2015	Best Film Director	Guardians of the Galaxy	James Gunn	Won	
2015	Best Actor in a Film	Guardians of the Galaxy	Chris Pratt	Won	
2015	Best Film Writing	Guardians of the Galaxy	James Gunn and Nicole Perlman	Nominated	
2015	Best Film Editing	Guardians of the Galaxy	Fred Raskin, Craig Wood and Hughes Winborne	Nominated	
2015	Best Film Production Design	Guardians of the Galaxy	Charles Wood	Nominated	
2015	Best Film Costume	Guardians of the Galaxy	Alexandra Byrne	Nominated	
2015	Best Film Make-up	Guardians of the Galaxy	David White and Elizabeth Yianni-Georgiou	Won	
2015	Best Film Special Effects	Guardians of the Galaxy	Stephane Ceretti, Nicolas Aithadi, Jonathan Fawkner and Paul Corbould	Nominated	
2016	Best Comic-to-Film Motion Picture	Avengers: Age of Ultron	Kevin Feige	Nominated	
2016	Best Supporting Actor in a Film	Avengers: Age of Ultron	Paul Bettany	Nominated	
2016	Best Film Costume	Avengers: Age of Ultron	Alexandra Byrne	Won	
2016	Best Film Special Effects	Avengers: Age of Ultron	Paul Corbould, Christopher Townsend, Ben Snow and Paul Butterworth	Nominated	
2016	Best Comic-to-Film Motion Picture	Ant-Man	Kevin Feige	Won	
2016	Best Film Director	Ant-Man	Peyton Reed	Nominated	
2016	Best Actor in a Film	Ant-Man	Paul Rudd	Nominated	
2016	Best Supporting Actor in a Film	Ant-Man	Michael Douglas	Nominated	
2016	Best Supporting Actress in a Film	Ant-Man	Evangeline Lilly	Nominated	
2016	Best Film Editing	Ant-Man	Dan Lebental and Colby Parker, Jr.	Nominated	
2017	Best Comic-to-Film Motion Picture	Captain America: Civil War	Kevin Feige	Nominated	
2017	Best Film Director	Captain America: Civil War	Anthony Russo and Joe Russo	Nominated	
2017	Best Actor in a Film	Captain America: Civil War	Chris Evans	Nominated	
2017	Best Supporting Actor in a Film	Captain America: Civil War	Chadwick Boseman	Nominated	
2017	Best Supporting Actress in a Film	Captain America: Civil War	Scarlett Johansson	Nominated	
2017	Best Performance by a Younger Actor in a Film	Captain America: Civil War	Tom Holland	Won	
2017	Best Film Editing	Captain America: Civil War	Jeffrey Ford and Matthew Schmidt	Nominated	
2017	Best Film Production Design	Captain America: Civil War	Owen Paterson	Nominated	
2017	Best Comic-to-Film Motion Picture	Doctor Strange	Kevin Feige	Won	
2017	Best Film Director	Doctor Strange	Scott Derrickson	Nominated	
2017	Best Actor in a Film	Doctor Strange	Benedict Cumberbatch	Nominated	
2017	Best Supporting Actress in a Film	Doctor Strange	Tilda Swinton	Won	
2017	Best Film Writing	Doctor Strange	Jon Spaihts, Scott Derrickson and C. Robert Cargill	Nominated	
2017	Best Film Production Design	Doctor Strange	Charles Wood	Nominated	
2017	Best Music	Doctor Strange	Michael Giacchino	Nominated	
2017	Best Film Costume	Doctor Strange	Alexandra Byrne	Nominated	
2017	Best Film Make-up	Doctor Strange	Jeremy Woodhead	Nominated	
2017	Best Film Special Effects	Doctor Strange	Stephane Ceretti, Richard Bluff and Vincent Cirelli	Nominated	
2018	Best Comic-to-Film Motion Picture	Guardians of the Galaxy Vol. 2	Kevin Feige	Nominated	
2018	Best Supporting Actor in a Film	Guardians of the Galaxy Vol. 2	Michael Rooker	Nominated	
2018	Best Film Make-up	Guardians of the Galaxy Vol. 2	John Blake and Brian Sipe	Nominated	
2018	Best Film Special Effects	Guardians of the Galaxy Vol. 2	Christopher Townsend, Guy Williams, Jonathan Fawkner and Dan Sudick	Won	
2018	Best Comic-to-Film Motion Picture	Spider-Man: Homecoming	Kevin Feige and Amy Pascal	Nominated	
2018	Best Supporting Actor in a Film	Spider-Man: Homecoming	Michael Keaton	Nominated	
2018	Best Performance by a Younger Actor in a Film	Spider-Man: Homecoming	Tom Holland	Won	
2018	Best Performance by a Younger Actor in a Film	Spider-Man: Homecoming	Zendaya	Nominated	
2018	Best Comic-to-Film Motion Picture	Thor: Ragnarok	Kevin Feige	Nominated	
2018	Best Supporting Actress in a Film	Thor: Ragnarok	Tessa Thompson	Nominated	
2018	Best Comic-to-Film Motion Picture	Black Panther	Kevin Feige	Won	
2018	Best Film Director	Black Panther	Ryan Coogler	Won	
2018	Best Actor in a Film	Black Panther	Chadwick Boseman	Nominated	
2018	Best Actress in a Film	Black Panther	Lupita Nyong'o	Nominated	
2018	Best Supporting Actor in a Film	Black Panther	Michael B. Jordan	Nominated	
2018	Best Supporting Actress in a Film	Black Panther	Danai Gurira	Won	
2018	Best Performance by a Younger Actor in a Film	Black Panther	Letitia Wright	Nominated	
2018	Best Film Writing	Black Panther	Ryan Coogler and Joe Robert Cole	Nominated	
2018	Best Film Production Design	Black Panther	Hannah Beachler	Won	
2018	Best Film Editing	Black Panther	Michael P. Shawver and Debbie Berman	Nominated	
2018	Best Music	Black Panther	Ludwig Göransson	Nominated	
2018	Best Film Costume	Black Panther	Ruth E. Carter	Nominated	
2018	Best Film Make-up	Black Panther	Joel Harlow and Ken Diaz	Won	
2018	Best Film Special Effects	Black Panther	Geoffrey Baumann, Craig Hammack and Dan Sudick	Nominated	
2019	Best Comic-to-Film Motion Picture	Avengers: Infinity War	Kevin Feige	Nominated	
2019	Best Supporting Actor in a Film	Avengers: Infinity War	Josh Brolin	Won	
2019	Best Comic-to-Film Motion Picture	Captain Marvel	Kevin Feige	Nominated	
2019	Best Film Director	Captain Marvel	Anna Boden and Ryan Fleck	Nominated	
2019	Best Actress in a Film	Captain Marvel	Brie Larson	Nominated	
2019	Best Comic-to-Film Motion Picture	Avengers: Endgame	Kevin Feige	Won	
2019	Best Film Director	Avengers: Endgame	Anthony Russo and Joe Russo	Nominated	
2019	Best Actor in a Film	Avengers: Endgame	Robert Downey Jr.	Won	
2019	Best Actor in a Film	Avengers: Endgame	Chris Evans	Nominated	
2019	Best Supporting Actor in a Film	Avengers: Endgame	Jeremy Renner	Nominated	
2019	Best Supporting Actress in a Film	Avengers: Endgame	Karen Gillan	Nominated	
2019	Best Supporting Actress in a Film	Avengers: Endgame	Scarlett Johansson	Nominated	
2019	Best Film Writing	Avengers: Endgame	Christopher Markus and Stephen McFeely	Nominated	
2019	Best Film Production Design	Avengers: Endgame	Charles Wood	Won	
2019	Best Film Editing	Avengers: Endgame	Jeffrey Ford and Matthew Schmidt	Won	
2019	Best Music	Avengers: Endgame	Alan Silvestri	Nominated	
2019	Best Film Costume	Avengers: Endgame	Judianna Makovsky	Nominated	
2019	Best Film Make-up	Avengers: Endgame	John Blake and Brian Sipe	Won	
2019	Best Film Special Effects	Avengers: Endgame	Dan DeLeeuw, Matt Aitken, Russell Earl and Dan Sudick	Won	
2019	Best Comic-to-Film Motion Picture	Spider-Man: Far From Home	Kevin Feige and Amy Pascal	Nominated	
2019	Best Supporting Actress in a Film	Spider-Man: Far From Home	Zendaya	Won	
2019	Best Performance by a Younger Actor in a Film	Spider-Man: Far From Home	Tom Holland	Won	
2019	Best Film Special Effects	Spider-Man: Far From Home	Janek Sirrs, Theodore Bialek, Brendan Seals and Alexis Wajsbrot	Nominated	
2022	Best Comic-to-Film Motion Picture	Shang-Chi and the Legend of the Ten Rings	Kevin Feige	Nominated	
2022	Best Actor in a Film	Shang-Chi and the Legend of the Ten Rings	Simu Liu	Nominated	
2022	Best Supporting Actress in a Film	Shang-Chi and the Legend of the Ten Rings	Awkwafina	Won	
2022	Best Music	Shang-Chi and the Legend of the Ten Rings	Joel P. West	Nominated	
2022	Best Film Production Design	Shang-Chi and the Legend of the Ten Rings	Sue Chan	Nominated	
2022	Best Film Costume	Shang-Chi and the Legend of the Ten Rings	Kym Barrett	Nominated	
2022	Best Film Special Effects	Shang-Chi and the Legend of the Ten Rings	Joe Farrell, Dan Oliver, Christopher Townsend and Sean Noel Walker	Nominated	
2022	Best Film Costume	Eternals	Sammy Sheldon	Nominated	
2022	Best Comic-to-Film Motion Picture	Spider-Man: No Way Home	Kevin Feige and Amy Pascal	Won	
2022	Best Film Director	Spider-Man: No Way Home	Jon Watts	Nominated	
2022	Best Actor in a Film	Spider-Man: No Way Home	Tom Holland	Nominated	
2022	Best Actress in a Film	Spider-Man: No Way Home	Zendaya	Nominated	
2022	Best Supporting Actor in a Film	Spider-Man: No Way Home	Alfred Molina	Nominated	
2022	Best Supporting Actress in a Film	Spider-Man: No Way Home	Marisa Tomei	Nominated	
2022	Best Film Writing	Spider-Man: No Way Home	Chris McKenna and Erik Sommers	Nominated	
2022	Best Film Editing	Spider-Man: No Way Home	Jeffrey Ford and Leigh Folsom	Nominated	
2022	Best Film Special Effects	Spider-Man: No Way Home	Kelly Port, Chris Waegner, Scott Edelstein and Dan Sudick	Nominated	
2022	Best Comic-to-Film Motion Picture	Doctor Strange in the Multiverse of Madness	Kevin Feige	Nominated	
2022	Best Supporting Actor in a Film	Doctor Strange in the Multiverse of Madness	Benedict Wong	Nominated	
2022	Best Music	Doctor Strange in the Multiverse of Madness	Danny Elfman	Won	
2022	Best Film Special Effects	Doctor Strange in the Multiverse of Madness	Jorundur Rafn Arnarson, Joe Letteri and Erik Winquist	Nominated	
2022	Best Comic-to-Film Motion Picture	Thor: Love and Thunder	Kevin Feige	Nominated	
2022	Best Film Costume	Thor: Love and Thunder	Mayes C. Rubeo	Nominated	
2022	Best Film Make-up	Thor: Love and Thunder	Matteo Silvi and Adam Johansen	Nominated	
2024	Best Comic-to-Film Motion Picture	Black Panther: Wakanda Forever	Kevin Feige and Nate Moore	Nominated	
2024	Best Supporting Actress in a Film	Black Panther: Wakanda Forever	Angela Bassett	Nominated	
2024	Best Film Costume	Black Panther: Wakanda Forever	Ruth E. Carter	Nominated	
2024	Best Comic-to-Film Motion Picture	Ant-Man and the Wasp: Quantumania	Kevin Feige and Stephen Broussard	Nominated	
2024	Best Comic-to-Film Motion Picture	Guardians of the Galaxy Vol. 3	Kevin Feige	Won	
2024	Best Film Director	Guardians of the Galaxy Vol. 3	James Gunn	Nominated	
2024	Best Actor in a Film	Guardians of the Galaxy Vol. 3	Chris Pratt	Nominated	
2024	Best Film Production Design	Guardians of the Galaxy Vol. 3	Beth Mickie	Nominated	
2024	Best Film Costume	Guardians of the Galaxy Vol. 3	Judianna Makovsky	Nominated	
2024	Best Film Make-up	Guardians of the Galaxy Vol. 3	Alexei Dmitriew, Lindsay MacGowan and Shane Mahan	Nominated	
2024	Best Film Special Effects	Guardians of the Galaxy Vol. 3	Stephane Ceretti, Alexis Wajsbrot, Guy Williams and Dan Sudick	Nominated	
2025	Best Action / Adventure Film	Deadpool & Wolverine	Deadpool & Wolverine	Won	
2025	Best Actor in a Film	Deadpool & Wolverine	Ryan Reynolds	Nominated	
2025	Best Supporting Actor in a Film	Deadpool & Wolverine	Hugh Jackman	Won	
2025	Best Supporting Actress in a Film	Deadpool & Wolverine	Emma Corrin	Nominated	
2025	Best Film Director	Deadpool & Wolverine	Shawn Levy	Nominated	
2025	Best Film Writing	Deadpool & Wolverine	Shawn Levy and Ryan Reynolds	Nominated	
2025	Best Film Special Effects	Deadpool & Wolverine	Deadpool & Wolverine	Nominated	
2025	Best Film Production Design	Deadpool & Wolverine	Ray Chan	Nominated	
2025	Best Film Editing	Deadpool & Wolverine	Dean Zimmerman and Shane Reid	Won	
2025	Best Film Costume	Deadpool & Wolverine	Graham Churchyard and Mayes C. Rubeo	Nominated	
2026	Best Cinematic Adaptation Film	The Fantastic Four: First Steps	The Fantastic Four: First Steps	Won	
2026	Best Film Direction	The Fantastic Four: First Steps	Matt Shakman	Nominated	
2026	Best Film Screenwriting	The Fantastic Four: First Steps	Josh Friedman, Jeff Kaplan, Eric Pearson, and Ian Springer	Nominated	
2026	Best Actor in a Film	The Fantastic Four: First Steps	Pedro Pascal	Nominated	
2026	Best Actress in a Film	The Fantastic Four: First Steps	Vanessa Kirby	Nominated	
2026	Best Supporting Actor in a Film	The Fantastic Four: First Steps	Ebon Moss-Bachrach	Nominated	
2026	Best Film Editing	The Fantastic Four: First Steps	Nona Khodai and Tim Roche	Nominated	
2026	Best Film Music	The Fantastic Four: First Steps	Michael Giacchino	Nominated	
2026	Best Film Production Design	The Fantastic Four: First Steps	Jille Azis and Kasra Farahani	Won	
2026	Best Film Costume Design	The Fantastic Four: First Steps	Alexandra Byrne	Nominated	
2026	Best Film Visual / Special Effects	The Fantastic Four: First Steps	Daniele Bigi, Lisa Marra, and Scott Stokdyk	Nominated	
2026	Best 4K Home Media Release	The Fantastic Four: First Steps	The Fantastic Four: First Steps	Nominated	

== Hugo Awards ==
Year	Category	Film	Nominee(s)	Result	Ref.
2009	Best Dramatic Presentation (Long Form)	Iron Man	Jon Favreau (director), Mark Fergus (screenplay), Hawk Ostby (screenplay), Art Marcum (screenplay), Matt Holloway (screenplay), Stan Lee (original characters), Don Heck (original characters), Larry Lieber (original characters), Jack Kirby (original characters)	Nominated	
2012	Best Dramatic Presentation (Long Form)	Captain America: The First Avenger	Joe Johnston (director), Christopher Markus (screenplay), Stephen McFeely (screenplay)	Nominated	
2013	Best Dramatic Presentation (Long Form)	The Avengers	Joss Whedon (director, screenplay)	Won	
2014	Best Dramatic Presentation (Long Form)	Iron Man 3	Shane Black (director, screenplay), Drew Pearce (screenplay)	Nominated	
2015	Best Dramatic Presentation (Long Form)	Guardians of the Galaxy	James Gunn (director, screenplay), Nicole Perlman (screenplay)	Won	
2015	Best Dramatic Presentation (Long Form)	Captain America: The Winter Soldier	Anthony Russo (director), Joe Russo (director), Christopher Markus (screenplay), Stephen McFeely (screenplay), Ed Brubaker (original story)	Nominated	
2016	Best Dramatic Presentation (Long Form)	Avengers: Age of Ultron	Joss Whedon (director, screenplay)	Nominated	
2018	Best Dramatic Presentation (Long Form)	Thor: Ragnarok	Taika Waititi (director), Eric Pearson (screenplay), Craig Kyle (screenplay), Christopher Yost (screenwriter)	Nominated	
2019	Best Dramatic Presentation (Long Form)	Black Panther	Ryan Coogler (director, screenplay), Joe Robert Cole (screenplay)	Nominated	
2019	Best Dramatic Presentation (Long Form)	Avengers: Infinity War	Anthony Russo (director), Joe Russo (director), Christopher Markus (screenplay), Stephen McFeely (screenplay)	Nominated	
2020	Best Dramatic Presentation (Long Form)	Captain Marvel	Anna Boden (director, screenplay), Ryan Fleck (director, screenplay), Geneva Robertson-Dworet (screenplay)	Nominated	
2020	Best Dramatic Presentation (Long Form)	Avengers: Endgame	Anthony Russo (director), Joe Russo (director), Christopher Markus (screenwriter), Stephen McFeely (screenplay)	Nominated	
2022	Best Dramatic Presentation (Long Form)	Shang-Chi and the Legend of the Ten Rings	Destin Daniel Cretton (director, screenplay), David Callaham (screenplay), Andrew Lanham (screenplay)	Nominated	
2023	Best Dramatic Presentation (Long Form)	Black Panther: Wakanda Forever	Ryan Coogler (director, screenplay), Joe Robert Cole (screenplay)	Nominated	

== MTV Movie & TV Awards ==
Year	Category	Film	Nominee(s)	Result	Ref.
2008	Best Summer Movie So Far	Iron Man	Kevin Feige	Won	
2009	Best Movie	Iron Man	Kevin Feige	Nominated	
2009	Best Male Performance	Iron Man	Robert Downey Jr.	Nominated	
2012	Best Hero	Thor	Chris Hemsworth	Nominated	
2012	Best Hero	Captain America: The First Avenger	Chris Evans	Nominated	
2013	Movie of the Year	The Avengers	Kevin Feige	Won	
2013	Best On-Screen Duo	The Avengers	Robert Downey Jr. & Mark Ruffalo	Nominated	
2013	Best Fight	The Avengers	Robert Downey Jr., Chris Evans, Mark Ruffalo, Chris Hemsworth, Scarlett Johansson & Jeremy Renner vs. Tom Hiddleston	Won	
2013	Best Hero	The Avengers	Robert Downey Jr.	Nominated	
2013	Best Hero	The Avengers	Mark Ruffalo	Nominated	
2013	Best Villain	The Avengers	Tom Hiddleston	Won	
2014	Best Hero	Iron Man 3	Robert Downey Jr.	Nominated	
2014	Best Cameo	Iron Man 3	Joan Rivers	Nominated	
2014	Best Hero	Thor: The Dark World	Chris Hemsworth	Nominated	
2014	Best Shirtless Performance	Thor: The Dark World	Chris Hemsworth	Nominated	
2014	Favorite Character	Thor: The Dark World	Loki Laufeyson	Nominated	
2015	Best Fight	Captain America: The Winter Soldier	Chris Evans vs. Sebastian Stan	Nominated	
2015	Best Kiss	Captain America: The Winter Soldier	Scarlett Johansson & Chris Evans	Nominated	
2015	Movie of the Year	Guardians of the Galaxy	Kevin Feige	Nominated	
2015	Best Male Performance	Guardians of the Galaxy	Chris Pratt	Nominated	
2015	Best On-Screen Duo	Guardians of the Galaxy	Bradley Cooper & Vin Diesel	Nominated	
2015	Best Shirtless Performance	Guardians of the Galaxy	Chris Pratt	Nominated	
2015	Best Musical Moment	Guardians of the Galaxy	Chris Pratt	Nominated	
2015	Best Comedic Performance	Guardians of the Galaxy	Chris Pratt	Nominated	
2015	Best On-Screen Transformation	Guardians of the Galaxy	Zoe Saldaña	Nominated	
2015	Best Hero	Guardians of the Galaxy	Chris Pratt	Nominated	
2016	Movie of the Year	Avengers: Age of Ultron	Kevin Feige	Nominated	
2016	Best Hero	Avengers: Age of Ultron	Chris Evans	Nominated	
2016	Best Villain	Avengers: Age of Ultron	James Spader	Nominated	
2016	Best Virtual Performance	Avengers: Age of Ultron	James Spader	Nominated	
2016	Ensemble Cast	Avengers: Age of Ultron	Cast	Nominated	
2016	Best Fight	Avengers: Age of Ultron	Robert Downey Jr. vs. Mark Ruffalo	Nominated	
2016	Best Hero	Ant-Man	Paul Rudd	Nominated	
2018	Scene Stealer	Thor: Ragnarok	Taika Waititi	Nominated	
2018	Best Fight	Thor: Ragnarok	Mark Ruffalo vs. Chris Hemsworth	Nominated	
2018	Movie of the Year	Black Panther	Kevin Feige	Won	
2018	Best Performance in a Movie	Black Panther	Chadwick Boseman	Won	
2018	Best Hero	Black Panther	Chadwick Boseman	Won	
2018	Best Villain	Black Panther	Michael B. Jordan	Won	
2018	Scene Stealer	Black Panther	Letitia Wright	Nominated	
2018	Best Fight	Black Panther	Chadwick Boseman vs. Winston Duke	Nominated	
2018	Best On-Screen Team	Black Panther	Chadwick Boseman, Lupita Nyong'o, Danai Gurira & Letitia Wright	Nominated	
2018	Movie of the Year	Avengers: Infinity War	Kevin Feige	Nominated	
2018	Best Villain	Avengers: Infinity War	Josh Brolin	Nominated	
2018	Best Fight	Avengers: Infinity War	Scarlett Johansson, Danai Gurira & Elizabeth Olsen vs. Carrie Coon	Nominated	
2019	Best Hero	Captain Marvel	Brie Larson	Nominated	
2019	Best Fight	Captain Marvel	Brie Larson vs. Gemma Chan	Won	
2019	Best Musical Moment	Captain Marvel	"Just a Girl"	Nominated	
2019	Best Movie	Avengers: Endgame	Kevin Feige	Won	
2019	Best Hero	Avengers: Endgame	Robert Downey Jr.	Won	
2019	Best Villain	Avengers: Endgame	Josh Brolin	Won	
2019	Best Fight	Avengers: Endgame	Josh Brolin vs. Chris Evans	Nominated	
2022	Best Fight	Black Widow	'Black Widow vs. Widows'	Nominated	
2022	Best Hero	Black Widow	Scarlett Johansson	Won	
2022	Best Movie	Shang-Chi and the Legend of the Ten Rings	Kevin Feige and Jonathan Schwartz	Nominated	
2022	Best Hero	Shang-Chi and the Legend of the Ten Rings	Simu Liu	Nominated	
2022	Best Fight	Shang-Chi and the Legend of the Ten Rings	'Shang-Chi bus fight'	Nominated	
2022	Best Movie	Spider-Man: No Way Home	Kevin Feige and Amy Pascal	Won	
2022	Best Performance in a Movie	Spider-Man: No Way Home	Tom Holland	Won	
2022	Best Hero	Spider-Man: No Way Home	Tom Holland	Nominated	
2022	Best Villain	Spider-Man: No Way Home	Willem Dafoe	Nominated	
2022	Best Kiss	Spider-Man: No Way Home	Tom Holland & Zendaya	Nominated	
2022	Best Fight	Spider-Man: No Way Home	'Spider-Men end battle'	Nominated	
2022	Best Team	Spider-Man: No Way Home	Tom Holland, Andrew Garfield & Tobey Maguire	Nominated	
2023	Best Movie	Black Panther: Wakanda Forever	Kevin Feige and Nate Moore	Nominated	
2023	Best Kick-Ass Cast	Black Panther: Wakanda Forever	Black Panther: Wakanda Forever	Nominated	
2023	Best Song	Black Panther: Wakanda Forever	Rihanna for "Lift Me Up"	Nominated	
2023	Best Villain	Doctor Strange in the Multiverse of Madness	Elizabeth Olsen	Won	
2023	Best Hero	Ant-Man and the Wasp: Quantumania	Paul Rudd	Nominated	
2023	Best Kick-Ass Cast	Ant-Man and the Wasp: Quantumania	Ant-Man and the Wasp: Quantumania	Nominated	

== Visual Effects Society Awards ==
Year	Category	Film	Nominee(s)	Result	Ref.
2009	Outstanding Visual Effects in a Visual Effects-Driven Feature Motion Picture	Iron Man	Ben Snow, Hal Hickel, Victoria Alonso, John Nelson	Nominated	
2009	Best Single Visual Effect of the Year	Iron Man	Ben Snow, Wayne Billheimer, Victoria Alonso, John Nelson	Nominated	
2009	Outstanding Animated Character in a Live Action Motion Picture	Iron Man	Hal Hickel, Bruce Holcomb, James Tooley, John Walker	Nominated	
2009	Outstanding Models and Miniatures in a Feature Motion Picture	Iron Man	Aaron McBride, Russell Paul, Gerald Gutschmidt, Kenji Yamaguchi for "Suit Up Machine"	Nominated	
2009	Outstanding Compositing in a Feature Motion Picture	Iron Man	Jonathan Rothbart, Dav Rauch, Kyle McCulloch, Kent Seki for "HUD Compositing"	Nominated	
2011	Outstanding Visual Effects in a Visual Effects-Driven Feature Motion Picture	Iron Man 2	Ben Snow, Ged Wright, Janek Sirrs, Susan Pickett	Nominated	
2011	Outstanding Models in a Feature Motion Picture	Iron Man 2	Bruce Holcomb, Ron Woodall, John Goodson, John Walker for "Hammer Military Drones"	Nominated	
2011	Outstanding Created Environment in a Feature Motion Picture	Iron Man 2	Giles Hancock, Richard Bluff, Todd Vaziri, Aaron McBride for the "Stark Expo"	Nominated	
2012	Outstanding Created Environment in a Live Action Feature Motion Picture	Thor	"Heimdall's Observatory": Pierre Buffin, Audrey Ferrara, Yoel Godo, Dominique Vidal	Nominated	
2012	Outstanding Virtual Cinematography in a Live Action Feature Motion Picture	Thor	Xavier Allard, Pierre Buffin, Nicolas Chevallier	Nominated	
2012	Outstanding Visual Effects in a Visual Effects-Driven Feature Motion Picture	Captain America: The First Avenger	Charlie Noble, Mark Soper, Christopher Townsend, Edson Williams	Nominated	
2012	Outstanding Compositing in a Feature Motion Picture	Captain America: The First Avenger	Casey Allen, Trent Claus, Brian Hajek, and Cliff Welsh	Won	
2013	Outstanding Visual Effects in a Visual Effects-Driven Feature Motion Picture	The Avengers	The Avengers: Susan Pickett, Janek Sirrs, Jeff White, and Guy Williams	Nominated	
2013	Outstanding Animated Character in a Live Action Feature Motion Picture	The Avengers	The Hulk: Marc Chu, John Doublestein, Cyrus Jam, and Jason Smith	Nominated	
2013	Outstanding Created Environment in a Live Action Feature Motion Picture	The Avengers	Midtown Manhattan: Richard Bluff, Giles Hancock, David Meny, and Andy Proctor	Won	
2013	Outstanding Virtual Cinematography in a Live Action Feature Motion Picture	The Avengers	Downtown Manhattan: Colin Benoit, Jeremy Goldman, Tory Mercer, and Anthony Rispoli	Nominated	
2013	Outstanding Models in a Feature Motion Picture	The Avengers	Helicarrier: Rene Garcia, Bruce Holcomb, Polly Ing, and Aaron Wilson	Won	
2013	Outstanding Compositing in a Feature Motion Picture	The Avengers	Hulk Punch: Chris Balog, Peter Demarest, Nelson Sepulveda, and Alan Travis	Nominated	
2014	Outstanding Visual Effects in an Effects Driven Feature Motion Picture	Iron Man 3	Christopher Townsend, Mark Soper, Guy Williams and Bryan Grill	Nominated	
2014	Outstanding Created Environment in a Live Action Feature Motion Picture	Iron Man 3	John Stevenson‐Galvin, Greg Notzelman, Paul Harris and Justin Stockton (for Shipyard)	Nominated	
2014	Outstanding Virtual Cinematography in a Live Action Feature Motion Picture	Iron Man 3	Mark Smith, Aaron Gilman, Thelvin Cabezas and Gerardo Ramirez	Nominated	
2014	Outstanding Compositing in a Feature Motion Picture	Iron Man 3	Michael Maloney, Francis Puthanangadi, Justin Van Der Lek, Howard Cabalfin (for Barrel of Monkeys sequence)	Nominated	
2014	Outstanding Compositing in a Feature Motion Picture	Iron Man 3	Darren Poe, Stefano Trivelli, Josiah Howison and Zach Zaubi (for House Attack sequence)	Nominated	
2015	Outstanding Created Environment in a Photoreal/Live Action Feature Motion Picture	Captain America: The Winter Soldier	Johan Thorngren, Greg Kegel, Quentin Marmier, Luis Calero for "Triskelion"	Nominated	
2015	Outstanding Effects Simulations in a Photoreal/Live Action Feature Motion Picture	Captain America: The Winter Soldier	Dan Pearson, Sheldon Serrao, Jose Burgos, Eric Jennings for "Helicarrier broadside and crash"	Nominated	
2015	Outstanding Visual Effects in a Visual Effects Driven Photoreal/Live Action Feature Motion Picture	Guardians of the Galaxy	Stephane Ceretti, Susan Pickett, Jonathan Fawkner, Nicolas Aithadi, Paul Corbould	Nominated	
2015	Outstanding Performance of an Animated Character in a Photoreal/Live Action Feature Motion Picture	Guardians of the Galaxy	Kevin Spruce, Rachel Williams, Laurie Brugger, Mark Wilson for "Rocket"	Nominated	
2016	Outstanding Animated Performance in a Photoreal Feature	Avengers: Age of Ultron	Jakub Pistecky, Lana Lan, John Walker, Sean Comer	Nominated	
2016	Outstanding Effects Simulations in a Photoreal Feature	Avengers: Age of Ultron	Michael Balog, Jim Van Allen, Florent Andorra, Georg Kaltenbrunner	Nominated	
2016	Outstanding Models in a Photoreal or Animated Project	Avengers: Age of Ultron	Howie Weed, Robert Marinic, Daniel Gonzalez, Myriam Catrin, for Hulkbuster	Nominated	
2016	Outstanding Created Environment in a Photoreal Feature	Ant-Man	Florian Witzel, Taylor Shaw, Alexis Hall, Heath Kraynak	Nominated	
2016	Outstanding Virtual Cinematography in a Photoreal Project	Ant-Man	James Baker, Alex Kahn, Thomas Luff, Rebecca Baehler	Nominated	
2017	Outstanding Visual Effects in a Photoreal Feature	Doctor Strange	Stephane Ceretti, Susan Pickett, Richard Bluff, Vincent Cirelli, Paul Corbould	Nominated	
2017	Outstanding Created Environment in a Photoreal Feature	Doctor Strange	London – Brendan Seals, Raphael A. Pimentel, Andrew Zink, Gregory Ng	Nominated	
2017	Outstanding Created Environment in a Photoreal Feature	Doctor Strange	New York City – Adam Watkins, Martijn van Herk, Tim Belsher, Jon Mitchell	Won	
2017	Outstanding Virtual Cinematography in a Photoreal Project	Doctor Strange	New York Mirror Dimension – Landis Fields, Mathew Cowie, Frederic Medioni, Faraz Hameed	Nominated	
2017	Outstanding Effects Simulations in a Photoreal Feature	Doctor Strange	Hong Kong Reverse Destruction – Florian Witzel, Georges Nakhle, Azhul Mohamed, David Kirchner	Nominated	
2017	Outstanding Compositing and Lighting in a Feature	Doctor Strange	New York City – Matthew Lane, Jose Fernandez, Ziad Shureih, Amy Shepard	Nominated	
2018	Outstanding Visual Effects in a Photoreal Feature	Guardians of the Galaxy Vol. 2	Christopher Townsend, Damien Carr, Guy Williams, Jonathan Fawkner, Dan Sudick	Nominated	
2018	Outstanding Virtual Cinematography in a Photoreal Project	Guardians of the Galaxy Vol. 2	James Baker, Steven Lo, Alvise Avati, Robert Stipp for "Groot Dance/Opening Fight"	Won	
2018	Outstanding Virtual Cinematography in a Photoreal Project	Thor: Ragnarok	Hubert Maston, Arthur Moody, Adam Paschke, Casey Schatz for "Valkyrie's Flashback"	Nominated	
2018	Outstanding Compositing in a Photoreal Feature	Thor: Ragnarok	Gavin McKenzie, David Simpson, Owen Carroll, Mark Gostlow for "Bridge Battle"	Nominated	
2019	Outstanding Visual Effects in a Photoreal Feature	Avengers: Infinity War	Daniel DeLeeuw, Jen Underdahl, Kelly Port, Matt Aitken, Dan Sudick	Won	
2019	Outstanding Animated Character in a Photoreal Feature	Avengers: Infinity War	Jan Philip Cramer, Darren Hendler, Paul Story, Sidney Kombo-Kintombo for "Thanos"	Won	
2019	Outstanding Model in a Photoreal or Animated Project	Avengers: Infinity War	Chad Roen, Ryan Rogers, Jeff Tetzlaff and Ming Pan for "Nidavellir Forge Megastructure"	Nominated	
2019	Outstanding Effects Simulations in a Photoreal Feature	Avengers: Infinity War	Gerardo Aguilera, Ashraf Ghoniem, Vasilis Pazionis and Hartwell Durfor for "Titan"	Won	
2019	Outstanding Effects Simulations in a Photoreal Feature	Avengers: Infinity War	Florian Witzel, Adam Lee, Miguel Perez Senent, Francisco Rodriguez for "Wakanda"	Nominated	
2019	Outstanding Compositing in a Photoreal Feature	Avengers: Infinity War	Sabine Laimer, Tim Walker, Tobias Wiesner and Massimo Pasquetti for "Titan"	Won	
2019	Outstanding Created Environment in a Photoreal Feature	Ant-Man and the Wasp	Florian Witzel, Harsh Mistri, Yuri Serizawa, Can Yuksel for Journey to the Quantum Realm	Nominated	
2020	Outstanding Compositing in a Photoreal Feature	Captain Marvel	Trent Claus, David Moreno Hernandez, Jeremiah Sweeney, Yuki Uehara (for "Young Nick Fury")	Nominated	
2020	Outstanding Visual Effects in a Photoreal Feature	Avengers: Endgame	Dan DeLeeuw, Jen Underdahl, Russell Earl, Matt Aitken, Dan Sudick	Nominated	
2020	Outstanding Animated Character in a Photoreal Feature	Avengers: Endgame	Kevin Martel, Ebrahim Jahromi, Sven Jensen, Robert Allman	Nominated	
2020	Outstanding Compositing in a Photoreal Feature	Avengers: Endgame	Tim Walker, Blake Winder, Tobias Wiesner, Joerg Bruemmer	Nominated	
2020	Outstanding Effects Simulations in a Photoreal Feature	Spider-Man: Far From Home	Adam Gailey, Jacob Santamaria, Jacob Clark, Stephanie Molk ("for "Molten Man")	Nominated	
2022	Outstanding Model in a Photoreal or Animated Project	Black Widow	"The Red Room" – Tristan John Connors, Bo Kwon, James Stuart, Ryan Duhaime	Nominated	
2022	Outstanding Compositing and Lighting in a Feature	Black Widow	"Red Room Crashing Back to Earth" – Michael Melchiorre, Simon Twine, Daniel Harkness, Tim Crowson	Nominated	
2022	Outstanding Visual Effects in a Photoreal Feature	Shang-Chi and the Legend of the Ten Rings	Christopher Townsend, Damien Carr, Joe Farrell, Sean Walker, Dan Oliver	Nominated	
2022	Outstanding Virtual Cinematography in a CG Project	Shang-Chi and the Legend of the Ten Rings	Sebastian Trujillo, Louis-Daniel Poulin, Nathan Abbot, Shannon Justison	Nominated	
2022	Outstanding Effects Simulations in a Photoreal Feature	Shang-Chi and the Legend of the Ten Rings	"Water, Bubbles & Magic" – Simone Riginelli, Claude Schitter, Teck Chee Koi, Arthur Graff	Nominated	
2022	Outstanding Compositing & Lighting in a Feature	Shang-Chi and the Legend of the Ten Rings	"Macau City" – Jeremie Maheu, Mathieu Dupuis, Karthic Ramesh, Jiri Kilevnik	Nominated	
2022	Outstanding Special (Practical) Effects in a Photoreal Project	Eternals	Neil Corbould, Keith Corbould, Ray Ferguson, Chris Motjuoadi	Nominated	
2022	Outstanding Visual Effects in a Photoreal Feature	Spider-Man: No Way Home	Kelly Port, Julia Neighly, Chris Waegner, Scott Edelstein, Dan Sudick	Nominated	
2022	Outstanding Created Environment in a Photoreal Feature	Spider-Man: No Way Home	"The Mirror Dimension" – Eric Le Dieu de Ville, Thomas Dotheij, Ryan Olliffe, Claire Le Teuff	Won	
2022	Outstanding Compositing & Lighting in a Feature	Spider-Man: No Way Home	"Liberty Island Battle & Christmas Swing Finale" – Zac Campbell, Frida Nerdal, Louis Corr, Kelvin Yee	Nominated	
2024	Outstanding Visual Effects in a Photoreal Feature	Guardians of the Galaxy Vol. 3	Stephane Ceretti, Susan Pickett, Alexis Wajsbrot, Guy Williams, Dan Sudick	Nominated	
2024	Outstanding Animated Character in a Photoreal Feature	Guardians of the Galaxy Vol. 3	Nathan McConnel, Andrea De Martis, Antony Magdalinidis, Rachel Williams for "Rocket"	Won	
2024	Outstanding Created Environment in a Photoreal Feature	Guardians of the Galaxy Vol. 3	Omar Alejandro, Lavrador Ibanez, Fabien Julvecourt, Klaudio Ladavac, Benjamin Patterson for "Knowhere"	Nominated	
2024	Outstanding Compositing and Lighting in a Feature	Guardians of the Galaxy Vol. 3	Indah Maretha, Beck Veitch, Nathan Abbot, Steve McGillen	Nominated	
2024	Outstanding Virtual Cinematography in a CG Project	Guardians of the Galaxy Vol. 3	Joanna Davison, Cheyana Wilkinson, Michael Cozens, Jason Desjarlais	Won	
2024	Outstanding Model in a Photoreal or Animated Project	Guardians of the Galaxy Vol. 3	Kenneth Johansson, Jason Galeon, Tim Civil, Artur Vill for "The Arête"	Nominated	
