= List of accolades received by Spider-Man: No Way Home =

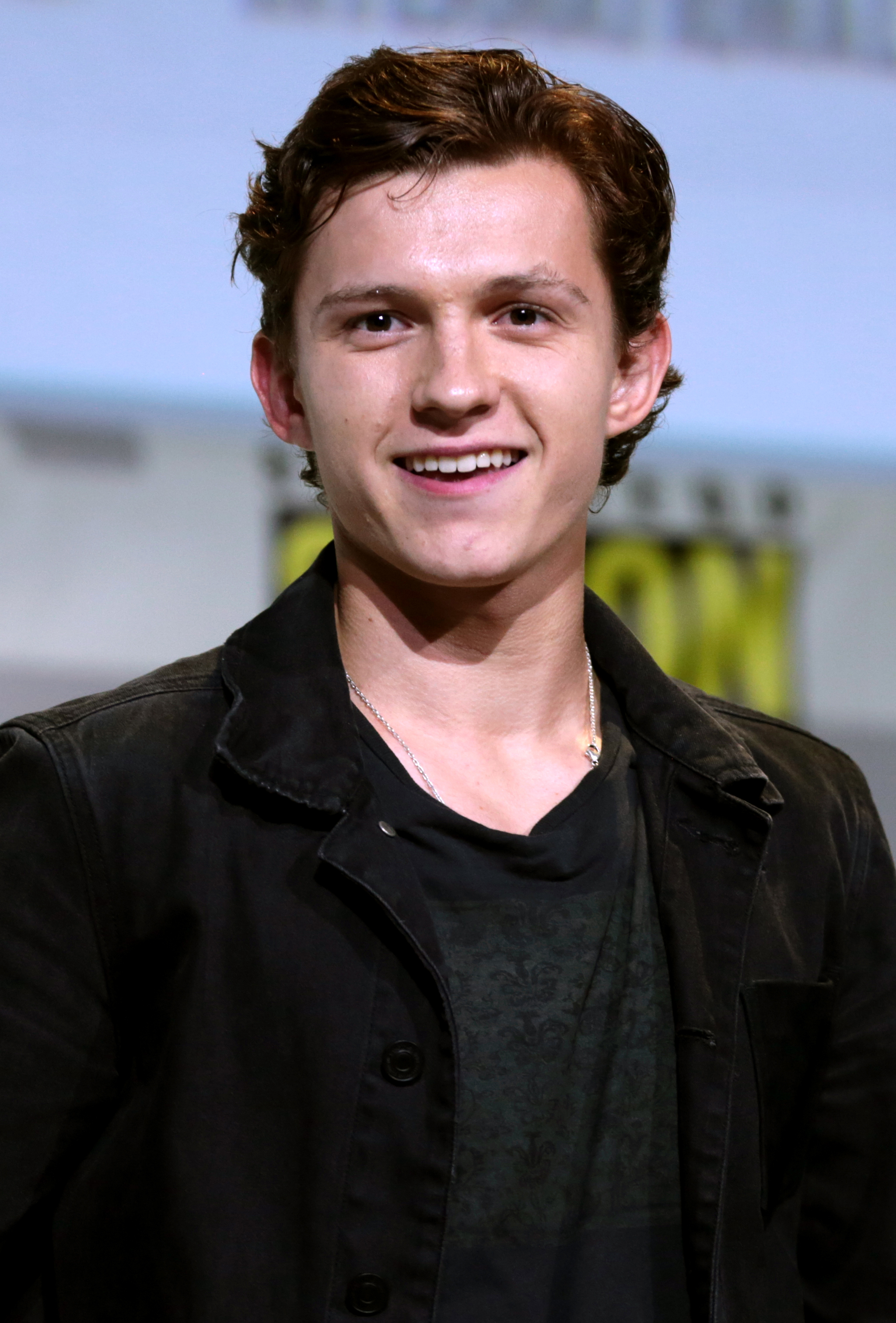
- Tom Holland's performance received acclaim from critics and audiences, and gave him several accolades.
Accolades
Award	Wins	Nominations
AACTA Awards	0	1
Academy Awards	0	1
Artios Awards	1	1
ASCAP Awards	2	2
Austin Film Critics Association Awards	0	1
BET Awards	1	1
Capri Hollywood International Film Festival	3	3
Cinema Audio Society Awards	0	1
Costume Designers Guild Awards	0	1
Critics' Choice Super Awards	3	5
Georgia Film Critics Association Awards	1	1
Golden Reel Awards	0	1
Golden Trailer Awards	0	3
Hollywood Music in Media Awards	0	1
Houston Film Critics Society Awards	0	1
ICG Publicists Awards	1	1
International Film Music Critics Association	1	2
Irish Film and Television Awards	0	1
Japan Academy Film Prize	0	1
London Film Critics' Circle Awards	1	1
Lumiere Awards	1	1
MTV Millennial Awards	1	1
MTV Movie & TV Awards	2	7
Nickelodeon Kids' Choice Awards	3	3
Online Film Critics Society Awards	0	1
San Diego Film Critics Society Awards	0	1
Santa Barbara International Film Festival	1	1
Saturn Awards	1	9
Seattle Film Critics Society Awards	0	2
Set Decorators Society of America Awards	0	1
Visual Effects Society	1	3

Totals (Note: Certain award groups do not simply award one winner. They acknowledge several different recipients, have runners-up, and have third place. Since this is a specific recognition and is different from losing an award, runner-up mentions are considered wins in this award tally. For simplification and to avoid errors, each award in this list has been presumed to have had a prior nomination.)
- Wins: 24
- Nominations: 60

Spider-Man: No Way Home is a 2021 American superhero film based on the Marvel Comics character Spider-Man, co-produced by Columbia Pictures and Marvel Studios and distributed by Sony Pictures Releasing. It is the sequel to Spider-Man: Homecoming (2017) and Spider-Man: Far From Home (2019), and the 27th film in the Marvel Cinematic Universe (MCU). The film was directed by Jon Watts and written by Chris McKenna and Erik Sommers, and stars Tom Holland as Peter Parker / Spider-Man alongside Zendaya, Benedict Cumberbatch, Jacob Batalon, Jon Favreau, Jamie Foxx, Willem Dafoe, Alfred Molina, Benedict Wong, Tony Revolori, Marisa Tomei, Andrew Garfield, and Tobey Maguire. In the film, Parker asks Dr. Stephen Strange (Cumberbatch) to use magic to make his identity as Spider-Man a secret again following its public revelation at the end of Far From Home. When the spell goes wrong, the multiverse is broken open which allows visitors from alternate realities to enter Parker's universe.

No Way Home premiered at the Fox Village Theatre in Los Angeles on December 13, 2021, and was theatrically released in the United States on December 17, as part of Phase Four of the MCU. The film received positive reviews from critics, who praised the story, direction, action sequences, and the cast's performances and chemistry. No Way Home has grossed over $1.9 billion worldwide, surpassing its predecessor as the highest-grossing film released by Sony Pictures. It became the highest-grossing film of 2021, the sixth-highest-grossing film of all time, the highest grossing Spider-Man film, and set several other box office records, including those for films released during the COVID-19 pandemic. On the review aggregator website Rotten Tomatoes, the film holds an approval rating of 93% based on 432 reviews.

The film received a nomination for an Academy Award, three Nickelodeon Kids' Choice Awards (winning all of the categories), five Critics' Choice Super Awards (winning three), nine Saturn Awards (winning one), among several others, chiefly for the writing and technical achievement. No Way Home, did not qualify for 75th British Academy Film Awards, as it was not available on BAFTA's streaming service. As a part of "Oscars Fan Favorite" contest for the 94th Academy Awards, the sequence where three Spider-Men teaming up was named one of the five finalists for Oscars Cheer Moment, finishing second, and being listed in the fourth to win the "Fan Favorite" contest, despite being considered as a clear favourite to win the contest. Apart from the technical aspects, both Holland and Garfield received accolades for their performances.

== Accolades ==
Accolades received by Spider-Man: No Way Home
Award	Date of ceremony	Category	Recipient(s)	Result	Ref.
AACTA Awards	December 7, 2022	Best Visual Effects or Animation	Kelly Port, Julia Neighly, Brendan Seals and Kilou Picard	Nominated	
Academy Awards	March 27, 2022	Best Visual Effects	Kelly Port, Chris Waegner, Scott Edelstein, and Dan Sudick	Nominated	
Artios Awards	March 23, 2022	The Zeitgeist Award	Sarah Halley Finn, Chase Paris, Tara Feldstein Bennett, and Molly Doyle	Won	
ASCAP Awards	May 2, 2022	Top Box Office Film of the Year	Michael Giacchino	Won	
ASCAP Awards	May 2, 2022	Top Box Office Films	Michael Giacchino	Won	
Austin Film Critics Association	January 11, 2022	Best Stunts	Spider-Man: No Way Home	Nominated	
BET Awards	June 26, 2022	Best Actress	Zendaya (Note: Also for Euphoria)	Won	
Capri Hollywood International Film Festival	January 3, 2022	Best Sound Editing	Spider-Man: No Way Home	Won	
Capri Hollywood International Film Festival	January 3, 2022	Best Sound Mixing	Spider-Man: No Way Home	Won	
Capri Hollywood International Film Festival	January 3, 2022	Best Visual Effects	Spider-Man: No Way Home	Won	
Cinema Audio Society	March 19, 2022	Outstanding Achievement in Sound Mixing for a Motion Picture – Live Action	Willie Burton, Kevin O'Connell, Tony Lamberti, Warren Brown, Howard London, Randy K. Singer	Nominated	
Costume Designers Guild Awards	March 9, 2022	Excellence in Sci-Fi/Fantasy Film	Sanja M. Hays	Nominated	
Critics' Choice Super Awards	March 17, 2022	Best Superhero Movie	Spider-Man: No Way Home	Won	
Critics' Choice Super Awards	March 17, 2022	Best Actor in a Superhero Movie	Andrew Garfield	Won	
Critics' Choice Super Awards	March 17, 2022	Best Actor in a Superhero Movie	Tom Holland	Nominated	
Critics' Choice Super Awards	March 17, 2022	Best Actress in a Superhero Movie	Zendaya	Nominated	
Critics' Choice Super Awards	March 17, 2022	Best Villain in a Movie	Willem Dafoe	Won	
Georgia Film Critics Association	January 14, 2022	Oglethorpe Award for Excellence in Georgia Cinema	Jon Watts, Chris McKenna, Erik Sommers	Won	
Golden Reel Awards	March 13, 2022	Outstanding Achievement in Sound Editing – Sound Effects and Foley for Feature Film	Anthony Lamberti (Sound Designer); Steven Ticknor (Supervising Sound Editor)	Nominated	
Golden Trailer Awards	October 6, 2022	Best Original Score	"Choose" (AV Squad)	Nominated	
Golden Trailer Awards	October 6, 2022	Best Digital: Action	"Overdrive" (Big Picture)	Nominated	
Golden Trailer Awards	October 6, 2022	Best Action/Thriller TrailerByte for a Feature Film	"Jolly" (Project X/AV)	Nominated	
Hollywood Music in Media Awards	November 16, 2022	Best Original Score in a Sci-Fi Film	Michael Giacchino (Note: Also for Thor: Love and Thunder and The Batman)	Nominated	
Houston Film Critics Society	January 19, 2022	Best Stunt Coordination	Spider-Man: No Way Home	Nominated	
ICG Publicists Awards	March 25, 2022	Maxwell Weinberg Publicists Showmanship Motion Picture Award	Spider-Man: No Way Home	Won	
International Film Music Critics Association	February 17, 2022	Best Original Score for a Fantasy/Science Fiction/Horror Film	Michael Giacchino	Nominated	
International Film Music Critics Association	February 17, 2022	Film Music Composition of the Year	"Arachnoverture" by Michael Giacchino	Won	
Irish Film and Television Awards	March 12, 2022	Best Visual Effects	Ed Bruce and Andrew Barry	Nominated	
Japan Academy Film Prize	March 10, 2023	Outstanding Foreign Language Film	Spider-Man: No Way Home	Nominated	
London Film Critics' Circle	February 6, 2022	British/Irish Actor of the Year	Andrew Garfield (Note: Also for Mainstream, The Eyes of Tammy Faye and Tick, Tick... Boom!)	Won	
Lumiere Awards	March 4, 2022	Governor's Cinema Award	Spider-Man: No Way Home	Won	
MTV Millennial Awards	July 10, 2022	Movie for the Win	Spider-Man: No Way Home	Won	
MTV Movie & TV Awards	June 5, 2022	Best Movie	Spider-Man: No Way Home	Won	
MTV Movie & TV Awards	June 5, 2022	Best Performance in a Movie	Tom Holland	Won	
MTV Movie & TV Awards	June 5, 2022	Best Hero	Tom Holland	Nominated	
MTV Movie & TV Awards	June 5, 2022	Best Villain	Willem Dafoe	Nominated	
MTV Movie & TV Awards	June 5, 2022	Best Kiss	Tom Holland and Zendaya	Nominated	
MTV Movie & TV Awards	June 5, 2022	Best Fight	'Spider-Men end battle'	Nominated	
MTV Movie & TV Awards	June 5, 2022	Best Team	Tom Holland, Andrew Garfield, and Tobey Maguire	Nominated	
Nickelodeon Kids' Choice Awards	April 9, 2022	Favorite Movie	Spider-Man: No Way Home	Won	
Nickelodeon Kids' Choice Awards	April 9, 2022	Favorite Movie Actor	Tom Holland	Won	
Nickelodeon Kids' Choice Awards	April 9, 2022	Favorite Movie Actress	Zendaya (Note: Also for Dune)	Won	
Online Film Critics Society	January 24, 2022	Best Visual Effects	Spider-Man: No Way Home	Nominated	
San Diego Film Critics Society	January 10, 2022	Best Visual Effects	Spider-Man: No Way Home	Nominated	
Santa Barbara International Film Festival	March 7, 2022	Variety Artisans Award	Kelly Port	Won	
Saturn Awards	October 25, 2022	Best Superhero Film	Spider-Man: No Way Home	Won	
Saturn Awards	October 25, 2022	Best Actor in a Film	Tom Holland	Nominated	
Saturn Awards	October 25, 2022	Best Actress in a Film	Zendaya	Nominated	
Saturn Awards	October 25, 2022	Best Supporting Actor in a Film	Alfred Molina	Nominated	
Saturn Awards	October 25, 2022	Best Supporting Actress in a Film	Marisa Tomei	Nominated	
Saturn Awards	October 25, 2022	Best Film Direction	Jon Watts	Nominated	
Saturn Awards	October 25, 2022	Best Film Writing (Screenplay)	Chris McKenna and Erik Sommers	Nominated	
Saturn Awards	October 25, 2022	Best Film Editing	Jeffrey Ford and Leigh Folsom	Nominated	
Saturn Awards	October 25, 2022	Best Film Visual / Special Effects	Kelly Port, Chris Waegner, Scott Edelstein, and Dan Sudick	Nominated	
Seattle Film Critics Society	January 17, 2022	Best Visual Effects	Kelly Port, Chris Waegner, Scott Edelstein, and Dan Sudick	Nominated	
Seattle Film Critics Society	January 17, 2022	Villain of the Year	Willem Dafoe	Nominated	
Set Decorators Society of America	February 22, 2022	Best Achievement in Décor/Design of a Science Fiction or Fantasy Feature Film	Rosemary Brandenburg (Set Decoration); Darren Gilford (Production Design)	Nominated	
Visual Effects Society	March 8, 2022	Outstanding Visual Effects in a Photoreal Feature	Kelly Port, Julia Neighly, Chris Waegner, Scott Edelstein, Dan Sudick	Nominated	
Visual Effects Society	March 8, 2022	Outstanding Created Environment in a Photoreal Feature	Eric Le Dieu de Ville, Thomas Dotheij, Ryan Olliffe, and Claire Le Teuff for "The Mirror Dimension"	Won	
Visual Effects Society	March 8, 2022	Outstanding Compositing & Lighting in a Feature	Zac Campbell, Frida Nerdal, Louis Corr, and Kelvin Yee for "Liberty Island Battle & Christmas Swing Finale"	Nominated	
