= Kelly Port =

American visual effects artist

- Born: Vancouver, Washington, U.S.
- Occupation: Visual effects supervisor

Kelly Port is an American visual effects artist. He was nominated for two Academy Awards in the category Best Visual Effects for the films Avengers: Infinity War and Spider-Man: No Way Home.

== Selected filmography ==
- Avengers: Infinity War (2018; co-nominated with Dan DeLeeuw, Russell Earl and Dan Sudick)
- Avengers: Endgame (2019)
- Spider-Man: No Way Home (2021; co-nominated with Dan Sudick, Scott Edelstein and Chris Waegner)
- Agatha All Along (2024; TV show)
- Godzilla x Kong: Supernova (2027; Filming)
