= Chris Waegner =

American visual effects artist

- Occupation: Visual effects artist

Chris Waegner is an American visual effects artist. He was nominated for an Academy Award in the category Best Visual Effects for the film Spider-Man: No Way Home.

== Selected filmography ==
- Spider-Man: No Way Home (2021; co-nominated with Kelly Port, Scott Edelstein and Dan Sudick)
