= Erik Sommers =

American screenwriter (born 1976)

- Born: December 16, 1976 (age 49); Syracuse, New York, U.S.
- Occupations: Television writer, television producer, screenwriter
- Years active: 1999–present

Erik Sommers is an American television writer, television producer and screenwriter.

== Career ==
Erik Sommers began his career working on the production staff of Stark Raving Mad.

During his time as a writer on American Dad, he met Chris McKenna, who would become his writing partner. Together they co-wrote The Lego Batman Movie and Jumanji: Welcome to the Jungle (both 2017), as well as part of the Marvel Cinematic Universe (MCU) Spider-Man movies from 2017–present and co-wrote another MCU film, Ant-Man and the Wasp, in 2018.

Announced on August 7, 2026 Sommers and his partner Mckenna were added to the writing team of Avengers: Doomsday and Avengers: Secret Wars alongside, Michael Waldron, and Stephen McFreely.

== Filmography ==
=== Film writer ===
- The Lego Batman Movie (2017)
- Spider-Man: Homecoming (2017)
- Jumanji: Welcome to the Jungle (2017)
- Ant-Man and the Wasp (2018)
- Spider-Man: Far From Home (2019)
- Spider-Man: No Way Home (2021)
- Ghosted (2023)
- Spider-Man: Brand New Day (2026)
- Avengers: Doomsday (2026, uncredited)

=== Television ===
| Year | Title | Writer | Producer | Notes |
|---|---|---|---|---|
| 2002–2003 | 3-South | Yes | No | Also staff writer |
| 2003–2004 | Crank Yankers | Yes | No | |
| 2004–2007 | Drawn Together | Yes | Yes | Also executive story editor |
| 2008 | Atom TV | Yes | Executive | |
| 2008–2013 | American Dad! | Yes | Yes | Also executive story editor, actor and supervising producer Nominated–Primetime Emmy Award for Outstanding Animated Program ("Hot Water") |
| 2012–2013 | Happy Endings | Yes | Co-executive | |
| 2014 | Community | Yes | Co-executive | Nominated–Online Film & Television Association Television Award for Best Writing |
| 2014–2015 | Marry Me | Yes | Co-executive | |
| 2015–2016 | Dr. Ken | Yes | Consulting | |

Other credits

| Year | Title | Role |
|---|---|---|
| 1999 | Stark Raving Mad | Production staff |
| 2002 | Greg the Bunny | Writers' assistant |
