= Spider-Man: No Way Home =

2021 Marvel Studios film

- Theatrical release poster
- Directed by: Jon Watts
- Written by: Chris McKenna; Erik Sommers
- Based on: Spider-Man by: Stan Lee; Steve Ditko
- Produced by: Kevin Feige; Amy Pascal
- Starring: Tom Holland; Zendaya; Benedict Cumberbatch; Jacob Batalon; Jon Favreau; Jamie Foxx; Willem Dafoe; Alfred Molina; Benedict Wong; Tony Revolori; Marisa Tomei; Andrew Garfield; Tobey Maguire
- Cinematography: Mauro Fiore
- Edited by: Jeffrey Ford; Leigh Folsom Boyd
- Music by: Michael Giacchino
- Production companies: Columbia Pictures; Marvel Studios; Pascal Pictures
- Distributed by: Sony Pictures Releasing
- Release dates: December 13, 2021 (Fox Village Theater); December 17, 2021 (United States)
- Running time: 148 minutes
- Country: United States
- Language: English
- Budget: $200 million
- Box office: $1.921 billion

Spider-Man: No Way Home is a 2021 American superhero film based on the Marvel Comics character Spider-Man. Produced by Columbia Pictures, Marvel Studios, and Pascal Pictures, and distributed by Sony Pictures Releasing, it is the sequel to Spider-Man: Homecoming (2017) and Spider-Man: Far From Home (2019), and the 27th film in the Marvel Cinematic Universe (MCU). The film was directed by Jon Watts, written by Chris McKenna and Erik Sommers, and stars Tom Holland as Peter Parker / Spider-Man alongside Zendaya, Benedict Cumberbatch, Jacob Batalon, Jon Favreau, Jamie Foxx, Willem Dafoe, Alfred Molina, Benedict Wong, Tony Revolori, Marisa Tomei, Andrew Garfield, and Tobey Maguire. In the film, Peter asks Dr. Stephen Strange (Cumberbatch) to use magic to make his identity as Spider-Man a secret again after it was revealed to the world at the end of Far From Home. When the spell goes wrong due to Peter's actions, the multiverse is broken open and several visitors from alternate realities are brought into Peter's universe.

A third MCU Spider-Man film was planned during the production of Homecoming in 2017. Negotiations between Sony and Marvel Studios to alter their deal—in which they produce the Spider-Man films together—ended with Marvel Studios leaving the project in August 2019, but a negative fan reaction led to a new deal between the companies a month later. Watts, McKenna, Sommers, and Holland were set to return, and filming took place from October 2020 to March 2021 in New York City and Atlanta. No Way Home serves as a crossover between the MCU and the previous Spider-Man films directed by Sam Raimi and Marc Webb. Several actors reprise their roles from those films, including previous Spider-Man actors Maguire and Garfield. The pair's involvement was the subject of wide speculation and numerous leaks despite Sony, Marvel, and the cast's efforts to conceal their involvement until the film's release.

Spider-Man: No Way Home premiered at the Fox Village Theater in Westwood, Los Angeles, on December 13, 2021, and was theatrically released in the United States on December 17, as part of Phase Four of the MCU. The film received positive reviews from critics and grossed $1.921 billion worldwide, surpassing its predecessor as the highest-grossing film released by Sony Pictures at the time. It became the highest-grossing film of 2021, the sixth-highest-grossing film at the time of its release, the highest-grossing Spider-Man film at the time, and set several other box office records, including those for films released during the COVID-19 pandemic. The film received a nomination for Best Visual Effects at the 94th Academy Awards, among numerous other accolades. An extended version, subtitled The More Fun Stuff Version, was theatrically released in September 2022. An additional planned film trilogy with Holland began with Spider-Man: Brand New Day, which was released in July 2026.

== Plot ==
After Quentin Beck frames Peter Parker for his murder and reveals that Peter is Spider-Man, the Department of Damage Control arrests Peter; his girlfriend, Michelle "MJ" Jones-Watson; his best friend, Ned Leeds; and his aunt, May Parker. Lawyer Matt Murdock gets Peter's charges dropped, but the group grapples with negative publicity. After Peter, MJ, and Ned's MIT applications are rejected, Peter goes to the New York Sanctum to ask Dr. Stephen Strange for help. Strange begins to cast a spell that would make everyone forget Peter is Spider-Man, but it is corrupted when Peter repeatedly requests alterations to let his loved ones retain their memories. Strange contains the corrupted spell.

At Strange's suggestion, Peter tries to convince an MIT administrator to reconsider MJ and Ned's applications. He is attacked by Otto Octavius, who rips nanotechnology from Peter's Iron Spider suit. This bonds with Octavius's mechanical tentacles and allows Peter to control them. As Norman Osborn arrives and attacks, Strange teleports Peter back to the Sanctum and locks Octavius in a cell next to Curt Connors. Strange explains that the corrupted spell summoned people from other universes within the multiverse who know Spider-Man's identity. He orders Peter, MJ, and Ned to find and capture the others; they locate and retrieve Max Dillon and Flint Marko at a military research facility.

Osborn reclaims control of himself from his split Green Goblin personality and destroys the Goblin mask. He gets help from May until Peter retrieves him. While discussing their battles with Spider-Man, Osborn, Octavius, and Dillon realize they were pulled from their universes just before their deaths. (Note: As depicted in Spider-Man (2002), Spider-Man 2 (2004), and The Amazing Spider-Man 2 (2014), respectively) Strange prepares to reverse the contained spell and send the villains back to their respective universes, but Peter argues that they should first help each villain to possibly change their fates upon their return. When Strange refuses, Peter steals the spell, traps Strange in the Mirror Dimension, and takes the villains to Happy Hogan's apartment. He uses Stark Industries technology to cure Octavius. Before Peter can cure anyone else, the Goblin persona retakes control of Osborn. The Goblin convinces the other villains to betray Peter and fatally wounds May as Dillon, Marko, and Connors escape; before she dies, May tells Peter that "with great power, there must also come great responsibility".

Ned discovers that he can create portals using Strange's sling ring, which he and MJ use to try to locate Peter. They instead find "Peter-Two" and "Peter-Three", alternate versions of Peter who were also summoned from the villains' universes by Strange's spell. The group finds this universe's Peter ("Peter-One"), who is mourning May and ready to send the villains home to die. The alternate Peters share stories of losing Uncle Ben (Note: As depicted in Spider-Man (2002)) and Gwen Stacy (Note: As depicted in The Amazing Spider-Man 2 (2014)) and encourage Peter-One to fight in May's honor. The three Peters develop cures for the villains and lure them to the Statue of Liberty. Peter-One and Peter-Two cure Connors and Marko while Octavius helps cure Dillon. Ned accidentally frees Strange from the Mirror Dimension. The Goblin unleashes the contained spell, breaking the barriers between universes and pulling in countless others who know Peter's identity. Strange attempts to hold them off while an enraged Peter-One tries to kill the Goblin. Peter-Two stops him and Peter-Three helps Peter-One inject the Goblin with his cure, restoring Osborn's sanity.

Peter-One realizes that the only way to protect the multiverse is to erase himself from everyone's memory and requests Strange do so while promising MJ and Ned that he will find them and remind them who he is. Strange reluctantly casts the spell, and everyone returns to their respective universes—including Eddie Brock, (Note: Brock was teleported to the MCU by Strange's first spell as seen at the end of Sony's Spider-Man Universe (SSU) film Venom: Let There Be Carnage (2021).) who unknowingly leaves behind a piece of the Venom symbiote. Two weeks later, Peter visits MJ to reintroduce himself to her and Ned, but decides against it. While mourning at May's grave, he has a conversation with an unknowing Hogan and is inspired to carry on, making a new Spider-Man suit and resuming his vigilantism.

== Cast ==
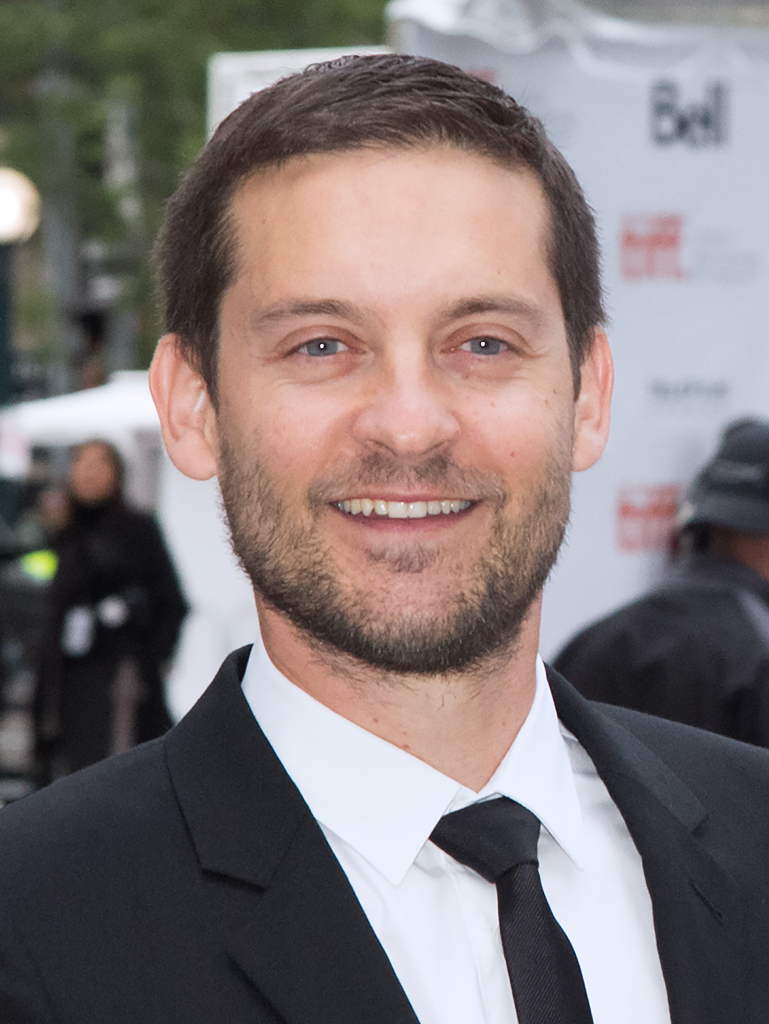
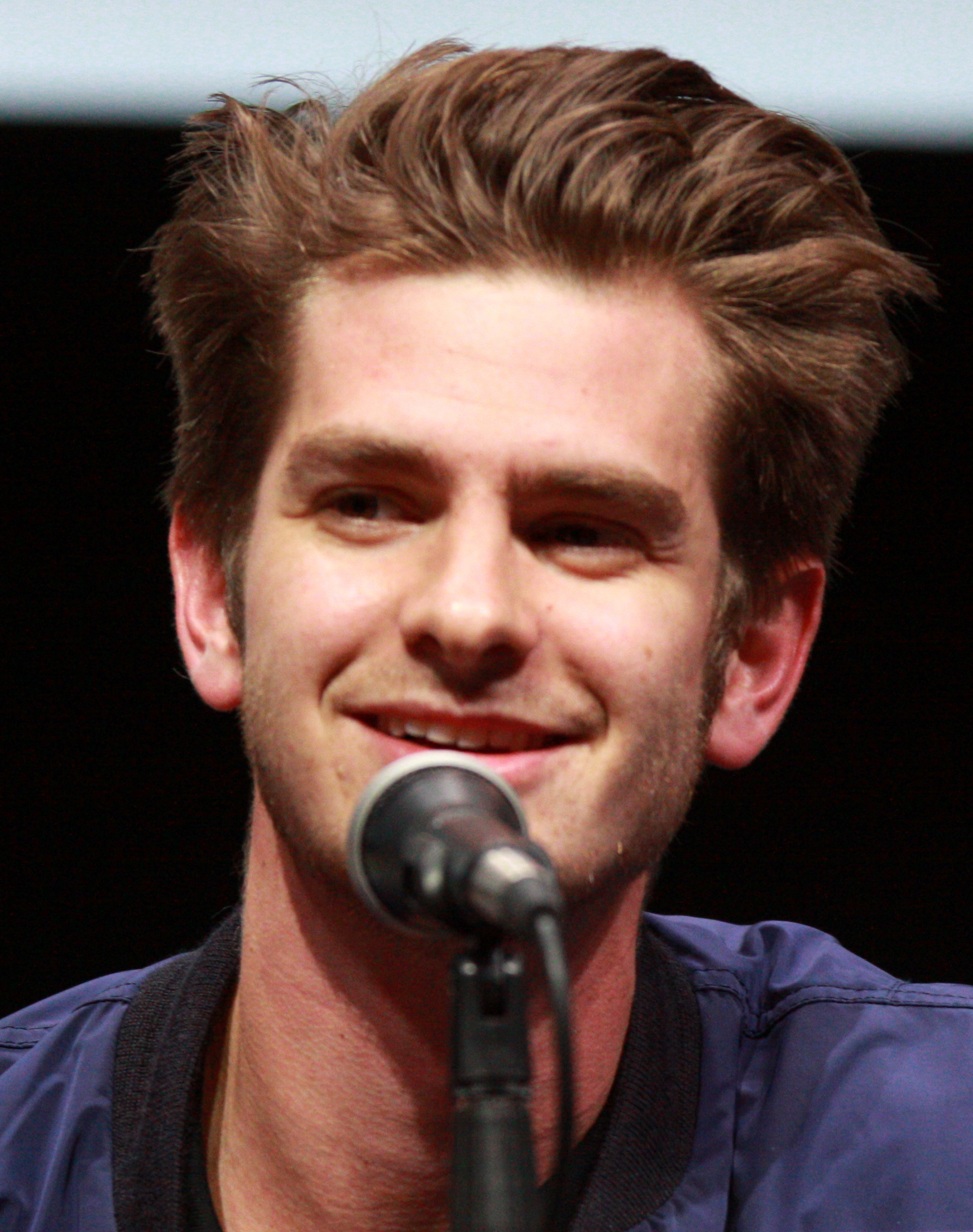
Tobey Maguire (left) and Andrew Garfield (right) return as their respective versions of Spider-Man from previous film franchises. Their involvement was kept secret by Marvel and Sony despite fan speculation and leaks before the film's premiere.
- Tom Holland as Peter Parker / Spider-Man:
  A teenager and Avenger who received spider-like abilities after being bitten by a radioactive spider. The film explores the fallout of the film Spider-Man: Far From Home's (2019) mid-credits scene, in which Peter's identity as Spider-Man is exposed, and Peter is more pessimistic in contrast to previous Marvel Cinematic Universe (MCU) films where he was depicted as more positive. Holland said Peter feels defeated and insecure following his identity being revealed, and was excited to explore the darker side of the character. The adjustment back to portraying Peter, including raising his voice pitch and returning to the mindset of a "naïve, charming teenager", was strange for Holland after taking on more mature roles such as in Cherry (2021) and Uncharted (2022).
- Zendaya as Michelle "MJ" Jones-Watson:
  Peter's classmate and girlfriend. The character's full name is revealed in the film, having previously just been known as Michelle Jones, bringing her closer to the comics counterpart Mary Jane Watson.
- Benedict Cumberbatch as Dr. Stephen Strange:
  A neurosurgeon who became a Master of the Mystic Arts following a career-ending car accident. Holland felt Strange was not a mentor to Peter, unlike Tony Stark / Iron Man in the film Spider-Man: Homecoming (2017), but instead saw them as colleagues and noted their relationship breaks down throughout the course of the film. Cumberbatch felt there was a close relationship between Strange and Peter because both are neighborhood superheroes with a shared history. Co-writer Chris McKenna described Strange as the voice of reason in the film.
- Jacob Batalon as Ned Leeds:
  Peter's best friend. Batalon lost 102 pounds (46 kg) for his role in this film. No Way Home also teases Ned's connection to sorcery by showing that he has the ability to open sling rings, in a nod to the 2020 comic storyline Symbiote Spider-Man: Alien Reality #1–6. Batalon revealed he improvved most of his lines for the film.
- Jon Favreau as Happy Hogan: The head of security for Stark Industries and former driver and bodyguard of Tony Stark, who looks after Peter.
- Jamie Foxx as Max Dillon / Electro:
  An Oscorp electrical engineer from an alternate reality who gained electric powers after an accident involving genetically modified electric eels. The character was redesigned for No Way Home, forgoing his original blue Ultimate Marvel-based design from Marc Webb's film The Amazing Spider-Man 2 (2014) in favor of a yellow one more similar to his mainstream comic book appearance.
- Willem Dafoe as Norman Osborn / Green Goblin:
  A scientist and the CEO of Oscorp from an alternate reality who tested an unstable strength enhancer on himself. He developed an insane split personality as a result and uses advanced Oscorp armor and equipment. Dafoe felt Green Goblin had advanced from his portrayal in Sam Raimi's film Spider-Man (2002) and had "a few more tricks up [his] sleeves" in this film. Dafoe was digitally de-aged for the role, and the character also obtains upgrades to his costume to make him more closely resemble his comic book counterpart.
- Alfred Molina as Otto Octavius / Doctor Octopus:
  A scientist from an alternate reality with four artificially intelligent mechanical tentacles fused to his body after an accident. The film continues from the character's story prior to his death in Raimi's Spider-Man 2 (2004). Molina was surprised by this approach because he had aged in the years since he made that film; digital de-aging was also used to make him look physically the same as in Spider-Man 2. The mechanical tentacles were created completely through CGI, rather than blending them with puppetry as in Spider-Man 2.
- Benedict Wong as Wong: Strange's mentor and friend who became the new Sorcerer Supreme during Strange's absence in the Blip.
- Tony Revolori as Eugene "Flash" Thompson: Peter's classmate and former rival.
- Marisa Tomei as May Parker:
  Peter's aunt. While developing the story, the writers realized that May would play a role similar to Uncle Ben's role in other incarnations of Spider-Man. As such, the thematic and often-paraphrasingly-quoted idiom "with great power, there must also come great responsibility" is said by May, since she has been the "moral guide" for Peter in the MCU.
- Andrew Garfield as Peter Parker / Spider-Man:
  An alternate version of Peter who is haunted by his failure to save his deceased girlfriend, Gwen Stacy, during the events of The Amazing Spider-Man 2. The other Spider-Men refer to him as "Peter-Three", while Marvel's official website named him "The Amazing Spider-Man". Garfield embraced his role as the middle brother of the group and was interested in exploring the idea of a tortured Peter following the events of The Amazing Spider-Man 2, including how lessons from those events could be passed to Holland's character. He was grateful for the chance to "tie up some loose ends" for his incarnation of Peter, and described working with Holland and Maguire as an opportunity to have "deeper conversations... about our experiences with the character". Peter ends up saving MJ during the climax in a similar way to how he fails to save Stacy in The Amazing Spider-Man 2; McKenna and co-writer Erik Sommers credited director Jon Watts for coming up with the idea while they watched a pre-visualization reel showcasing ideas for the climactic battle.
- Tobey Maguire as Peter Parker / Spider-Man:
  An alternate version of Peter who uses organic webbing instead of web shooters like his alternate counterparts. The other Spider-Men refer to him as "Peter-Two", while Marvel's official website named him the "Friendly Neighborhood Spider-Man". Maguire wanted the film to reveal only minimal details about what happened to his character after the events of Raimi's film Spider-Man 3 (2007).

Rhys Ifans reprises his role as Dr. Curt Connors / Lizard, an Oscorp scientist from Webb's film The Amazing Spider-Man (2012) who transformed into a large reptilian monster while trying to regrow his missing arm. Thomas Haden Church reprises his role as Flint Marko / Sandman, a small-time thief from Spider-Man 3 who received an ability to transform into sand. Both Ifans and Church returned to voice the characters, though footage at the end of the film when they revert to their human forms was archival footage from The Amazing Spider-Man and Spider-Man 3, respectively. Watts served as a stand-in for Church on-set by providing motion-capture reference to the uncredited body double who physically replaced Church in the role. Charlie Cox reprises his role as Matt Murdock from Marvel Television's Netflix series, and Tom Hardy reprises his roles as Eddie Brock / Venom from Sony's Spider-Man Universe (SSU) in an uncredited cameo appearance in the mid-credits scene.

Reprising their roles from previous MCU Spider-Man films are Angourie Rice as Betty Brant, Peter's classmate and Ned's ex-girlfriend; Hannibal Buress as Coach Wilson, Midtown School of Science and Technology's gym teacher; Martin Starr as Roger Harrington, Peter's academic decathlon teacher; J. B. Smoove as Julius Dell, Peter's teacher; J. K. Simmons as J. Jonah Jameson, the host of The Daily Bugle; and Gary Weeks as Department of Damage Control (DODC) agent Foster. Jake Gyllenhaal appears as Quentin Beck / Mysterio via archival footage from Far From Home. Also appearing in the film are Paula Newsome as an MIT administrator, Arian Moayed as DODC agent Cleary, Mary Rivera as Ned's grandmother, and Cristo Fernández as a bartender serving Brock. Tom Holland's brother Harry Holland was set to make a cameo as a thief, but his scenes were cut from the original theatrical release. Lexi Rabe, who portrayed Stark's daughter Morgan in the film Avengers: Endgame (2019), also had an appearance that was not included in the theatrical release.

== Production ==
=== Development ===
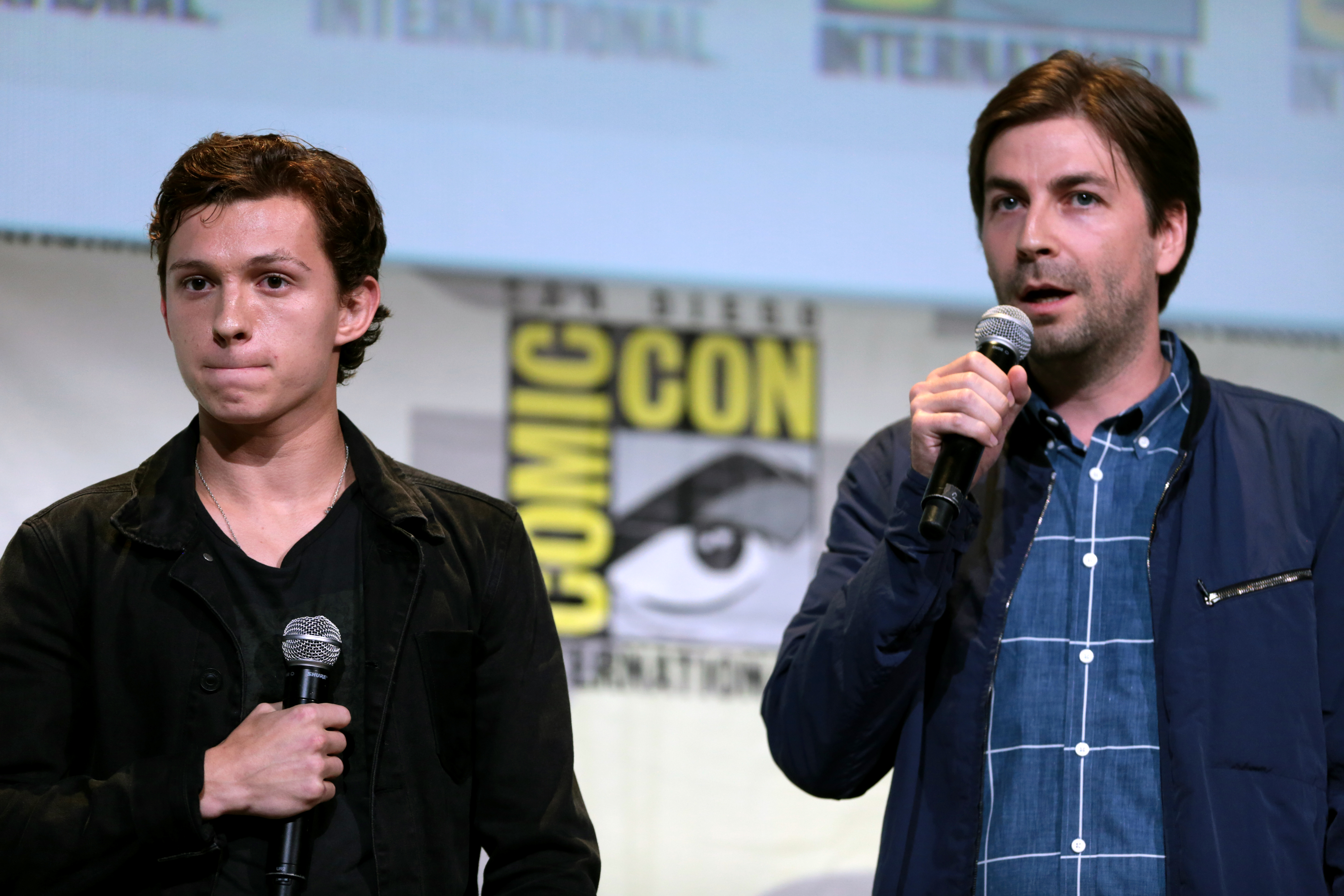
Lead actor Tom Holland and director Jon Watts in 2016

During production on the film Spider-Man: Homecoming (2017), two sequels were being planned by Marvel Studios and Sony Pictures. In June 2017, star Tom Holland explained that each film would take place during a different year of high school for Peter Parker / Spider-Man, with the third being set during the character's senior year. Marvel Studios President Kevin Feige noted in July 2019 that the third film would feature "a Peter Parker story that has never been done before on film" due to the ending of the second film, Spider-Man: Far From Home (2019), which publicly reveals that Peter is Spider-Man.

Development on third and fourth MCU Spider-Man films had begun by August 2019, with Sony hoping Holland and director Jon Watts would return for both; Holland was contracted to return for one more film, while Watts had completed his two-film deal and would need to sign on for any more films. By then, Marvel Studios and its parent company The Walt Disney Studios had spent several months discussing expanding their deal with Sony. The existing deal had Marvel and Feige produce the Spider-Man films for Sony and receive 5% of their revenue. Sony wanted to expand the deal to include more films while keeping the same terms of the original agreement. Disney expressed concern with Feige's workload producing the Marvel Cinematic Universe (MCU) franchise already and asked for a 25–50% stake in any future films Feige produced for Sony. Unable to come to an agreement, Sony announced that it would be moving forward on the next Spider-Man film without Feige or Marvel's involvement. Their statement acknowledged that this could change in the future, thanked Feige for his work on the first two films, and said they appreciated "the path [Feige] has helped put us on, which we will continue." Chris McKenna and Erik Sommers were writing the screenplay for the third film by the time of Sony's announcement, after also doing so for Far From Home, but Watts was receiving offers to direct large films for other studios instead of returning to the franchise, including potentially working on a different property for Marvel Studios and Feige.

In September 2019, Sony Pictures Entertainment chairman Tony Vinciquerra said that "for the moment the door is closed" on Spider-Man returning to the MCU and confirmed that the character would be integrated with Sony's own shared universe—Sony's Spider-Man Universe (SSU)—moving forward. Responding to backlash from fans following the announcement, Vinciquerra added that "the Marvel people are terrific people, we have great respect for them, but on the other hand we have some pretty terrific people of our own. [Feige] didn't do all the work ... we're pretty capable of doing what we have to do here." However, after this fan reaction continued at Disney's biennial convention D23, and at the urging of Holland who personally spoke to Disney CEO Bob Iger and Sony Pictures Motion Picture Group chairman Tom Rothman, the companies returned to negotiations. Sony and Disney announced a new agreement at the end of September which would allow Marvel Studios and Feige to produce another MCU Spider-Man film for Sony with Amy Pascal, scheduled for July 16, 2021. Disney was reportedly co-financing 25% of the film in exchange for 25% of its profits, while retaining the character's merchandising rights. Feige said he was "thrilled" that the character would remain in the MCU and said "all of us at Marvel Studios are very excited that we get to keep working" on the franchise. The agreement also allowed Holland's Spider-Man to appear in a future Marvel Studios film as well as crossing over to Sony's own shared universe, with the latter interaction described as "a 'call and answer' between the two franchises as they acknowledge details between the two in what would loosely be described as a shared detailed universe". Sony described their previous films with Marvel Studios as a "great collaboration", and said "our mutual desire to continue was equal to that of the many fans." At the time of the new agreement, Watts was in final negotiations to direct the film.

Discussing the new deal in early October, Iger attributed it to the efforts of Holland as well as the fan response to the end of the original deal. He felt that both Sony and Disney had initially forgotten that "there are other people who actually matter" while they were negotiating. Rothman said the deal was a "win-win-win. A win for Sony, a win for Disney, a win for the fans." He felt the initial reports on the negotiations did not necessarily line up with the actual discussions that were taking place, and said the final deal would have eventuated without the reports and fan discourse. By the middle of the month, Zendaya was confirmed to be reprising her role as Michelle "MJ" Jones-Watson from the previous films in the sequel.

=== Pre-production ===
McKenna and Sommers began working on the script in earnest by December 2019. One of the first ideas they had was having Dr. Jonathon Ohnn / Spot as the main villain of the film, but Sony rejected this as that character was planned to be introduced in the animated film Spider-Man: Across the Spider-Verse (2023). The next month, Holland described it as "the most ambitious standalone superhero" film, and again denied the rumors that Maguire and Garfield would appear. At the end of February, the film's title was revealed to be Spider-Man: No Way Home, continuing the naming convention of the past two films of featuring "home" in the title. Filming took place at Midtown High School from March 19 to 21. The Atlanta Public Schools system had stopped allowing buildings in the district for use as filming locations because of the COVID-19 pandemic, but gave this film an exception since both the Frederick Douglass and Midtown schools were previously used as filming locations in Homecoming. Hannibal Buress was revealed to be reprising his role as gym teacher Coach Wilson, with Buress releasing a music video in August 2021 revealing that he had filmed scenes in Atlanta. Holland said No Way Home had more "visceral" fight sequences than the previous two films, with more hand-to-hand combat. Filming wrapped on March 26, 2021.

=== Post-production ===
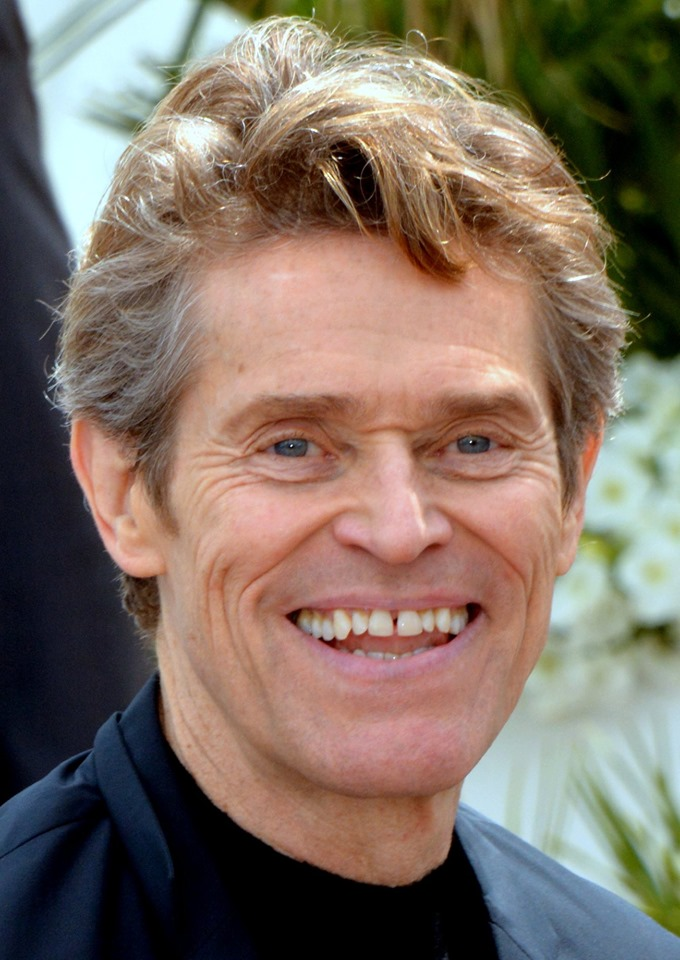
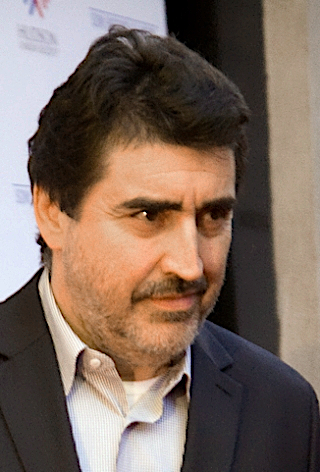
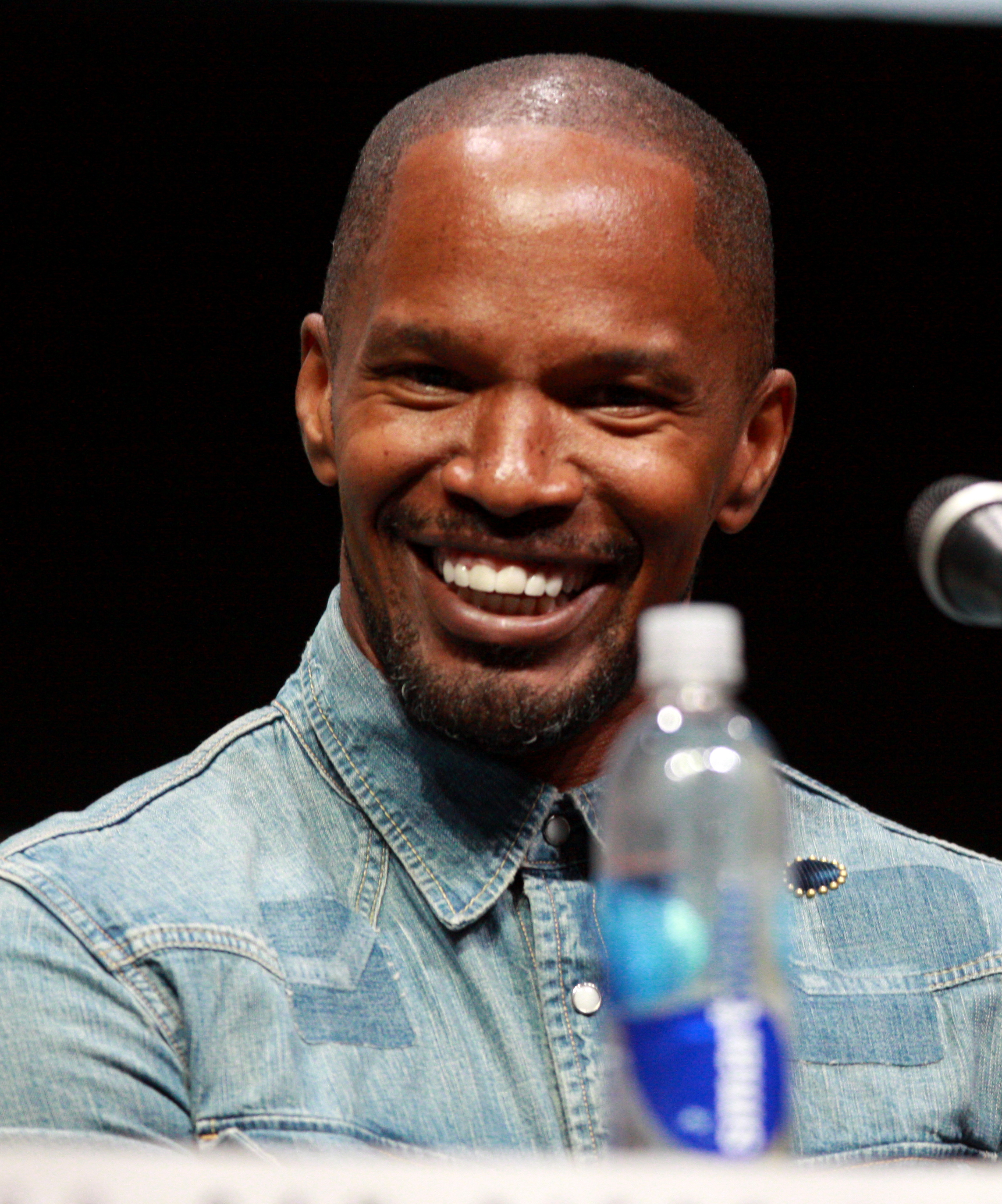
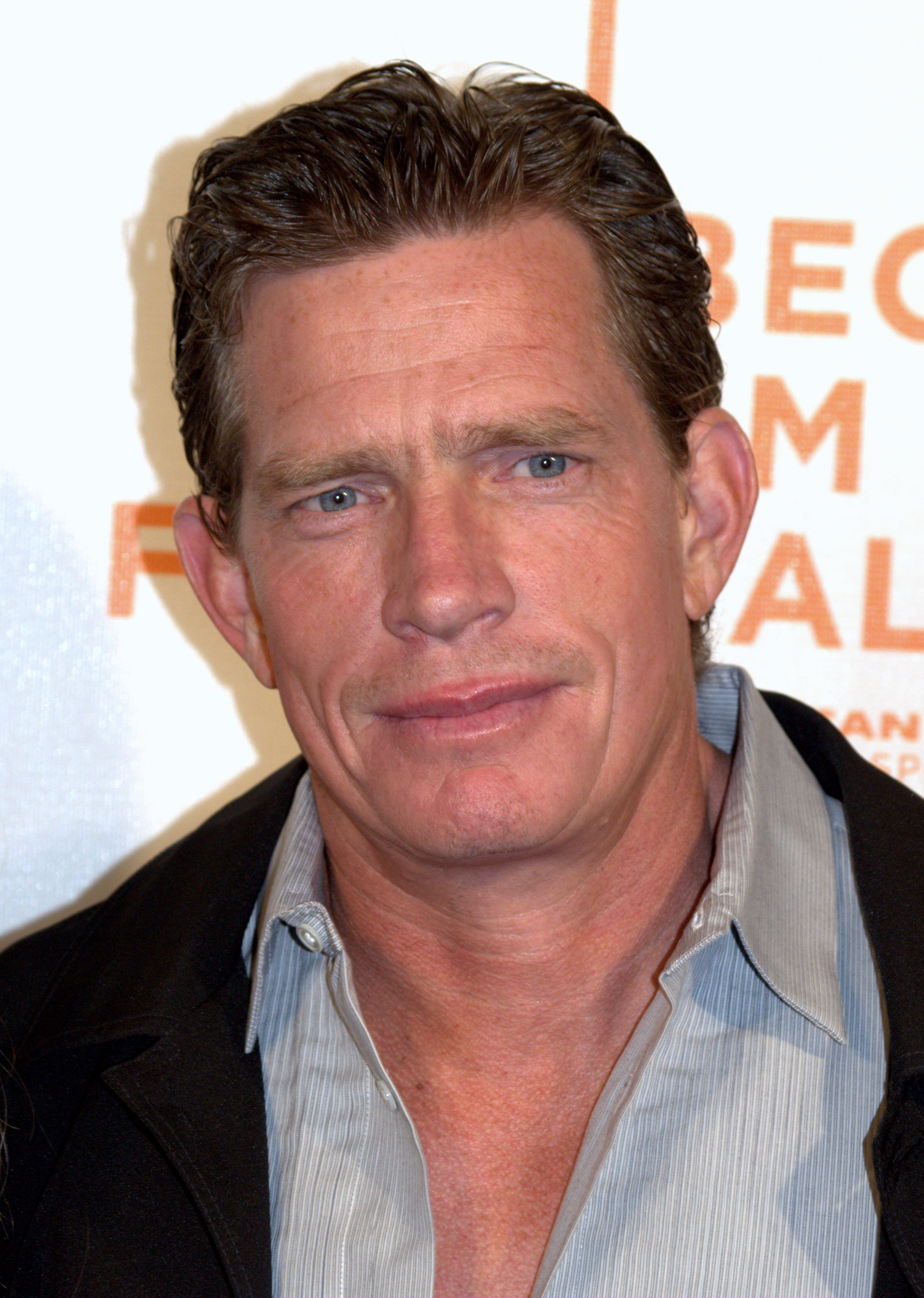
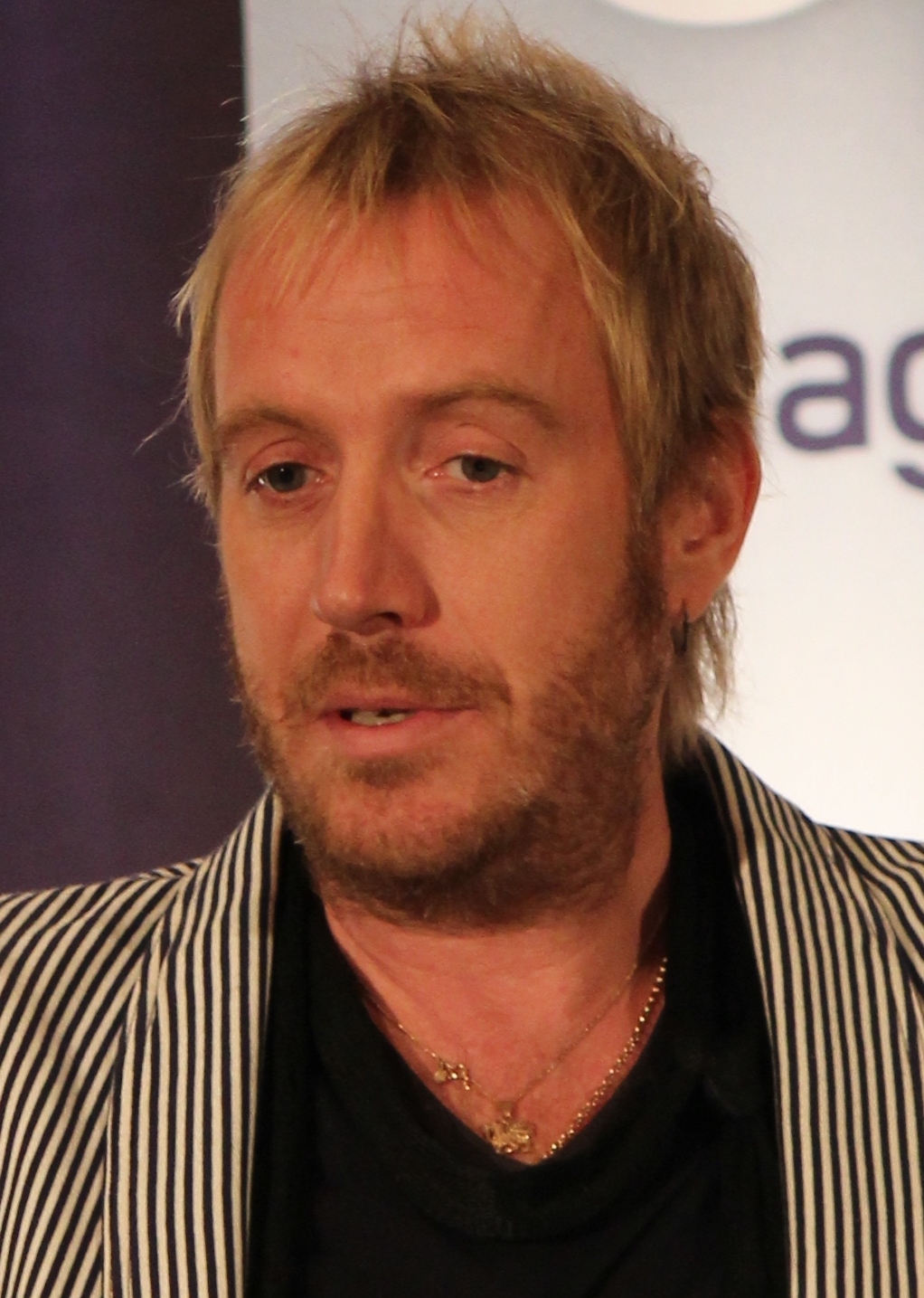
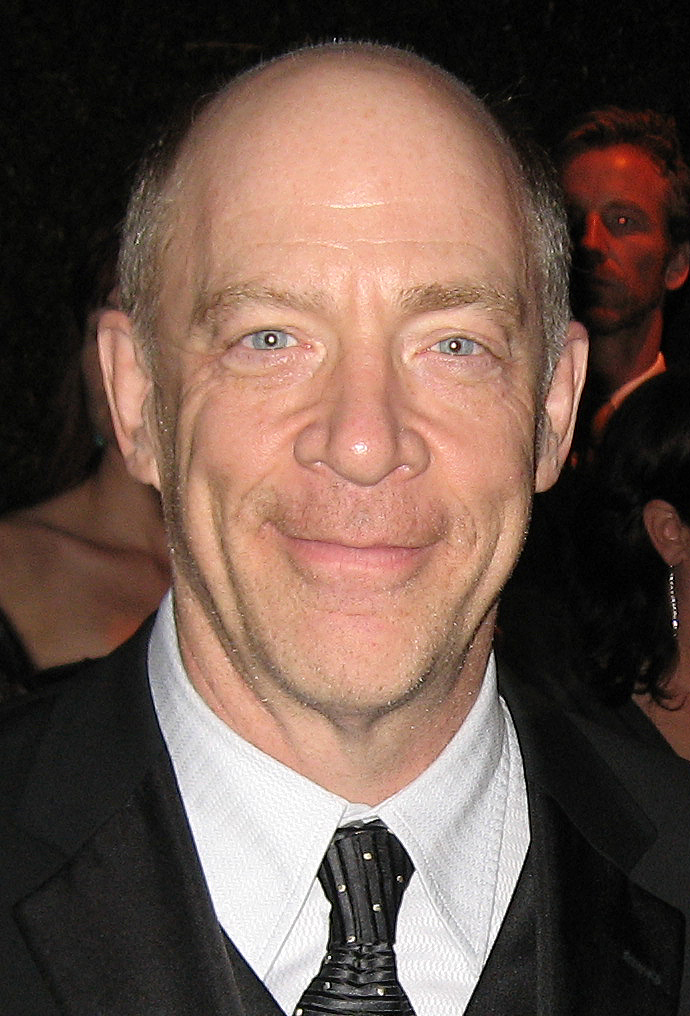
Actors reprising their roles from earlier Spider-Man films include Willem Dafoe as Green Goblin, Alfred Molina as Doctor Octopus, Jamie Foxx as Electro, Thomas Haden Church as Sandman, Rhys Ifans as Lizard, and J. K. Simmons as J. Jonah Jameson.

In April 2021, Molina confirmed that he was appearing in the film, explaining that he had been told not to talk about his role in the film during production but he realized that his appearance had been widely rumored and reported on. Later that month, J. B. Smoove revealed that he was returning as Julius Dell from Far From Home, while Cox stated that he was not involved with the film. In early May, Garfield denied that he had been asked to appear in the film, but later said "never say never", while Angourie Rice was revealed to be returning as Betty Brant in the film, reprising her role from previous MCU media. Later that month, Stone denied her involvement in the film.

Sony Pictures Motion Picture Group President Sanford Panitch acknowledged in May 2021 that there had been confusion and frustration from fans regarding the relationship between the SSU and the MCU but stated that there was a plan to clarify this. He believed it was already "getting a little more clear for people [as to] where we're headed" at that time and added that the release of No Way Home would reveal more of this plan. Vary commented that the apparent introduction of multiverse elements in No Way Home could be what would allow Holland to appear in both the MCU and the SSU. The official trailer for No Way Home confirmed the involvements of Jon Favreau as Harold "Happy" Hogan and Benedict Wong as Wong, reprising their roles from past MCU films, as well as J. K. Simmons as J. Jonah Jameson from Far From Home (Simmons previously played a different version of the character in the Raimi trilogy as well). It was also confirmed that the characters Electro and Green Goblin would appear in the film, with the implication that this incarnation of Green Goblin would be Willem Dafoe's version from the Raimi films. In September 2021, Garfield again denied he was in the film, saying, "No matter what I say... it's either going to be really disappointing for people or it's going to be really exciting". Garfield later described his denials as "rather stressful but also weirdly enjoyable".

In early October 2021, many commentators expected Tom Hardy to reprise his roles as Eddie Brock and Venom from the SSU films Venom (2018) and Venom: Let There Be Carnage (2021), after the Let There Be Carnage mid-credits scene showed the characters being transported from their universe (the SSU) to the MCU. Feige said there was a lot of coordination between the Let There Be Carnage and No Way Home teams to create the scene, which was directed by Watts during the production of No Way Home. Hardy ultimately appeared as Brock in the film's mid-credits scene, though there had been discussions about integrating him into the film's final battle, as well as bonding Holland's Peter to a symbiote. Later that month, Empire's issue on No Way Home stated that the film would include the returns of Doctor Octopus, Electro, Dafoe's Green Goblin, Thomas Haden Church's Flint Marko / Sandman from Raimi's film Spider-Man 3 (2007) and Rhys Ifans's Curt Connors / Lizard from Webb's film The Amazing Spider-Man (2012). Church's role in the film was originally meant to be larger, counting with a subplot of his own about Sandman's relationship with his daughter Penny (who was previously portrayed by Perla Haney-Jardine), but the COVID-19 pandemic and the script being rewritten led to his role's reduction, only providing scratch dialogue and some motion-capture at a San Antonio, Texas parking lot. Watts said these were still unconfirmed rumors and was in "no hurry to confirm or deny appearances" of the characters, while Feige said the rumors were fun for fans but audiences should not expect them all to come true. At the beginning of November, Jorge Lendeborg Jr. revealed that he would be reprising his role as Jason Ionello from Homecoming and Far From Home in a similar role to those films that would have "very little to do with the core" story. By the middle of the month, additional photography had been completed for the film. Pascal described No Way Home as "the culmination of the Homecoming trilogy", and Arian Moayed revealed that he had a role in the film, playing Department of Damage Control (DODC) agent Cleary. At that time, Dunst confirmed that she would not appear in the film, but also stated that she would "never say no" to reprising her role as Mary Jane Watson.

Also in November 2021, the film's second trailer confirmed the involvements of Dafoe, Church, and Ifans. Paul Giamatti's Aleksei Sytsevich / Rhino from The Amazing Spider-Man 2 and Jake Gyllenhaal's Quentin Beck / Mysterio from Far From Home were also considered for inclusion, with McKenna and Sommers playing with the idea of a Sinister Six forming; Rhino, Mysterio, and the Sinister Six ultimately did not appear in the film, though archival footage of Gyllenhaal as Beck from Far From Home was used in No Way Home. In mid-December, Martin Starr was confirmed to be appearing as Roger Harrington in the film, reprising his role from previous MCU media. A teaser trailer for Multiverse of Madness was included at the end of the film as a post-credits scene, before being released online shortly after No Way Home's theatrical release. Jeffrey Ford and Leigh Folsom Boyd served as the film's editors. The visual effects were provided by Cinesite, Clear Angle Studios, Crafty Apes, Digital Domain, Folks VFX, Framestore, Luma Pictures, Monsters Aliens Robots Zombies, Mr. X, Perception, Secret Lab, Sony Pictures Imageworks, and SSVFX. Concepts considered but ultimately not used in the film include: Holland's Peter meeting Jameson in the latter's apartment; a cameo appearance by the version of Peter Parker / Spider-Man from Insomniac Games's Marvel's Spider-Man video game series; Doctor Octopus donning a comics-accurate green and yellow costume; a more comics-accurate look for the Lizard; Green Goblin adding parts of Iron Man's armor to his own; and Ned riding the Goblin Glider in a homage to his Hobgoblin persona in the comics. The scene of Holland's Peter's first confrontation with the Green Goblin in Hogan's apartment went through several different iterations, including one that featured Michael Keaton's Adrian Toomes / Vulture from Homecoming, and another in which the Goblin bombs Hogan's apartment with May still inside, presumably killing her differently than how it was depicted in the final cut of the film.

== Music ==
In November 2020, Homecoming and Far From Home composer Michael Giacchino was confirmed to be returning for No Way Home. The film's score album was released digitally on December 17, 2021, with a track titled "Arachnoverture" released as a single on December 9 and another titled "Exit Through the Lobby" released the following day. Giacchino references themes from previous Spider-Man films by Hans Zimmer, James Horner, Christopher Young, and Danny Elfman, as well as his own themes from Doctor Strange (2016). Regarding the use of these other themes, Giacchino did not want their use to be fan service and finding ways to include them in a "very targeted" way. He and Watts were "very much in alignment in terms of when to use them and when not to use them for their maximum effect".

== Marketing ==
In May 2020, Sony entered a promotional partnership with Hyundai Motor Group to showcase their new models and technologies in the film; Hyundai later released a commercial, titled "Only Way Home", that was directed by Watts to promote the film and the Ioniq 5 electric-powered SUV (which appears in the film along with the Hyundai Tucson), with Holland and Batalon starring. In late February 2021, Holland, Batalon, and Zendaya released three stills featuring their characters from the film alongside fake logos with the titles Spider-Man: Phone Home, Spider-Man: Home-Wrecker, and Spider-Man: Home Slice, respectively. The film's official title was announced the next day with a video showing Holland, Batalon, and Zendaya leaving Watts's office (where they supposedly received the fake titles). Batalon and Zendaya note that Holland could not be trusted with the actual title since he had "accidentally" revealed the second film's title. The video ends on a whiteboard showing the film's true title, among various other titles featuring the word "home" that were apparently considered. Jennifer Bisset of CNET suggested the fake titles and logos could represent the villains in the film, including Foxx's Electro and Molina's Doctor Octopus, while TheWrap's Umberto Gonzalez called them funny "bait-and-switch fakes", and noted the Phone Home title referenced a line from E.T. the Extra-Terrestrial (1982). Gregory Lawrence of Collider felt the Home-Wrecker title could point to the film feeling like a 1990s thriller film, and said the fake titles were a "solid goof" to excite fans. He also compared the stills to the "terrifying/awe-inspiring wonder" of Steven Spielberg films and The Goonies (1985), while Germain Lussier from io9 said they gave off "subtle National Treasure, Indiana Jones vibes". In July 2021, Marvel revealed various toys and figurines for the film, including Funko Pops, Marvel Legends figures, and Lego sets.

At the end of August 2021, when asked about the lack of trailer and official images or descriptions for the film, Feige stated that the film was not being "any more or less secret than any of our other projects" and reaffirmed that a trailer would be released before the film's premiere in theaters. Though Sony handles the marketing for the film, their marketing team is in coordination with Disney's to ensure each knows when the other is releasing MCU-related content so it is a "win-win for everybody". On August 22, an apparent leak of the first trailer was shared on social media, which The Hollywood Reporter deemed "legitimate" after Sony worked to have various copies of the trailer taken down. Adam Chitwood at Collider noted the built-up online "fervor" surrounding the trailer and felt that it would not be able to "live up to the hype fans have built up in their minds". Chitwood continued that the other 2021 film releases from Marvel Studios had not seen a similar level of demand as No Way Home, pointing out that all of the rumored castings had positioned the film to be a "once-in-a-lifetime moviegoing experience" if they were accurate. He also wondered if Sony was wary of committing to marketing that noted the film's December 2021 release date amid the resurgence of the COVID-19 Delta variant.

The film's teaser trailer was officially released on August 23 during Sony's CinemaCon 2021 panel. Entertainment Weekly's Devan Coggan noted that the trailer confirmed the multiverse's role in the film, including elements from the Raimi and Webb films, while Ethan Anderton from /Film called the trailer "nothing short of thrilling" since it confirmed many of the previous rumors about the film. Austen Goslin at Polygon conversely felt much of what had been rumored did not get revealed in the trailer, feeling that the rumors were either false or Marvel was still intending to keep them a secret. Anderton's colleague Joshua Meyer called the trailer "a doozy... packed with jaw-dropping moments" and noted how the film would be adapting the "One More Day" comic book storyline; Newby had previously noted the apparent adaption of "One More Day" and "One Moment in Time" storylines following the reveal of Cumberbatch's casting. Many commentators noted the possible teases of Spider-Man villains Sandman and the Lizard in the trailer as an indication of the Sinister Six forming in the film. Vinnie Mancuso at Collider was excited to see the return of Molina and the potential for Dafoe's involvement, but called it a "cheap pop" since it was doing "a disservice to the stories you're trying to tell in the present by reminding the audience how much better things used to be". He also felt the trailer played into "Marvel's ongoing reluctance to let Tom Holland's Spider-Man star in his own Spider-Man movies" since the trailer gave Peter "zero memorable moments" among all of its elements. The trailer had 355.5 million global views in its first 24 hours, becoming the most viewed trailer in that time period. This surpassed the record of Avengers: Endgame (289 million views) and more than doubled the views for the Spider-Man: Far From Home trailer (135 million). It also generated the largest 24-hour social media conversation volume of all-time globally with 4.5 million mentions, made up of 2.91 million in the United States, and 1.5 million internationally; these both exceeded Avengers: Endgame's mentions (1.94 million in the United States, 1.38 million internationally).

The second official trailer premiered at a fan screening at the Regal Sherman Oaks theater in Los Angeles on November 16, 2021. Goslin felt the trailer "reveals the full extent of Marvel's Spider-Man multiverse", while his colleague Matt Patches noted the missing appearance of Maguire's or Garfield's Spider-Man in the trailer but felt that it was "entirely possible the actors appear in No Way Home". Jason Robbins of Collider was disappointed by the trailer, saying it was "what we expected, but less", since it just showed the returning villains and had no confirmation of Maguire or Garfield or "further insight into the multiverse". Some commentators said parts of the trailer appeared as though Maguire and Garfield had been edited out of the footage, such as a shot in which the Lizard appears to be struck by an invisible force. On November 24, Sony began releasing several videos on TikTok as part of their The Daily Bugle viral marketing campaign featuring Simmons and Rice. In December 2021, the first minute of the film premiered exclusively on Late Night with Seth Meyers, while a newsstand for The Daily Bugle was set up in New York City in partnership with Liberty Mutual to promote the film. Other marketing partners include the video games Fortnite and PUBG Mobile, which featured special in-game Spider-Man themed props and costumes, Asus, whose Republic of Gamers (ROG) laptop is used by Ned in the film, Xiaomi, iQOO, Continental AG, and Tampico Beverages. The film had a total promotional marketing value of $202 million.

== Release ==
=== Theatrical ===
Spider-Man: No Way Home had its world premiere at Fox Village Theater in Westwood, Los Angeles, on December 13, 2021. The film was released in the United Kingdom and Ireland on December 15, and in the United States on December 17, where it opened in 4,325 theaters, including in RealD 3D, IMAX, and other premium large formats. It was initially set for release on July 16, 2021, but was pushed back to November 5, before it was further pushed back to the December 2021 date due to the COVID-19 pandemic. It is part of Phase Four of the MCU.

In August 2021, Sony and CJ 4DPlex announced a deal to release 15 of Sony's films over three years in the ScreenX format, including No Way Home. In November 2021, the film was reported to be getting a theatrical release in China, making it the first Phase Four film to do so as Black Widow, Shang-Chi and the Legend of the Ten Rings, and Eternals were not released in the country, though by February 2022, there had been no release date, in part because of diplomatic tensions between the country and the United States, which stemmed in part from the U.S. diplomatic boycott of the 2022 Beijing Winter Olympics. Chinese authorities requested for the Statue of Liberty to be removed from the film for it to be released in the country, but Sony refused.

In March 2024, Sony announced that all of their live-action Spider-Man films would be re-released in theaters as part of Columbia Pictures' 100th anniversary celebration. Spider-Man: No Way Home was re-released on June 3, 2024.

==== The More Fun Stuff Version ====
Theatrical release poster for The More Fun Stuff Version. It was considered an improvement from the original poster as it featured all the characters previously kept secret with the marketing of the original release.

An extended cut of the film, subtitled The More Fun Stuff Version, was announced in June 2022. The re-release celebrated 60 years of Spider-Man in comics and 20 years of Spider-Man in film, and featured approximately 13 minutes of additional and deleted scenes. The additions included: an introduction by Holland, Maguire, and Garfield; additional scenes of Peter and May being interrogated by the Department of Damage Control; the scene with Holland's brother Harry as a thief that was cut from the original release; additional scenes of Peter at school; Brant interviewing Peter, his teachers, and his classmates; Daily Bugle reports of Peter's first day back at school and the arrivals of Dillon and Marko; additional scenes in the basement of the New York Sanctum; a scene featuring May, Peter, and the villains in an elevator while on the way to Hogan's apartment; an additional scene with Murdock and Hogan; additional scenes of the three Peters; and a new post-credits scene, replacing the teaser trailer of Multiverse of Madness, which showcases the effects of Strange's second spell.

The More Fun Stuff Version was released in theaters beginning August 31, 2022, in Indonesia, followed by the United States and Canada, among other countries, on September 1, and later in several other markets through October 6. The poster for the extended cut was considered an improvement on the original release's marketing, since it was able to feature all of the characters who were previously kept secret in the lead up to the film's release. Shrishty Mishra at Collider said it was an "Avengers-style poster [with] a perfect blend of multiverse feels, combined with the 'Where's Waldo' effect". Anthony Lund of MovieWeb called it an "epic poster that [the fans] have been calling out for". ComicBook.com's Russ Burlingame said the poster was what "we've all been waiting for" and "a big change in the way [Sony] initially promoted the movie" since they "continued to play coy" on the cameos after the film had released.

=== Home media ===
External images
- of course, we got THE meme... presents the home media announcement tweet and 1960s TV series meme homage image from SpiderManMovie's Twitter
- The Spider-Man pointing meme, via The Origins of the Iconic 'Spider-Man' Pointing' Meme, Nerdist Industries

Spider-Man: No Way Home was released by Sony Pictures Home Entertainment on digital download on March 15, 2022, and on Ultra HD Blu-ray, Blu-ray, and DVD on April 12. Digitally, the film was also available in a three-film bundle including all of Marvel Studios' Spider-Man films, as well as an eight-film bundle including Holland, Maguire, and Garfield's films. Sony moved the digital release up to March 15 from March 22, following Blu-ray versions of the film being leaked to torrent sites. The home media includes a gag reel and various behind-the-scenes featurettes, including two roundtable discussions: one with Dafoe, Molina, and Foxx, and another with Holland, Maguire, and Garfield. It has the most pre-release digital purchases on Vudu, surpassing the purchases for Endgame. To announce the home media release dates, Sony and the film's social media accounts posted a photo of Holland, Maguire, and Garfield recreating a popular meme from the 1967 Spider-Man television series of multiple Spider-Men pointing at one another; the tweets of the image garnered more than 10,000 retweets within minutes of being posted. Within its first week of release, the film sold over 2.1 million digital units in the United States, equaling $42 million; this was a record for a film's first week available on digital release. It was also the highest-selling film on physical media for 2022 in the US according to The NPD Group.

The film was released on Starz following its theatrical and home media releases, the last film released by Sony with an exclusive limited streaming video on demand (SVOD) release on Starz. Subsequent films would be released on Netflix after their theatrical and home media releases, through 2026. Additionally, Sony signed a deal with Disney in April 2021 giving the latter access to Sony's legacy content, including past Spider-Man films and Marvel content in the SSU, to stream on Disney+ and Hulu and appear on Disney's linear television networks. Disney's access to Sony's titles released from 2022 through 2026 would follow their availability on Netflix, with No Way Home becoming available on Disney+ in the United States on April 15, 2026. In February 2022, Sony expanded their pre-existing deal with WarnerMedia for making their films available on HBO Max and HBO across Central and Eastern Europe, which included No Way Home. The More Fun Stuff Version was released by Sony Pictures Home Entertainment on digital on October 18, 2022, as Spider-Man: No Way Home – Extended Cut, when it also began streaming on Starz.

== Reception ==
=== Box office ===
Spider-Man: No Way Home grossed $814.9 million in the United States and Canada, and $1.107 billion in other territories for a worldwide total of $1.921 billion. It became the highest-grossing film of 2021, the sixth-highest-grossing film of all time, the third-highest-grossing film in the United States and Canada, the highest-grossing Spider-Man film, and the highest-grossing film released by Sony. No Way Home is also the first film since Star Wars: The Rise of Skywalker (2019) to gross over $1 billion, becoming the third-fastest to reach that milestone and the first to do so during the COVID-19 pandemic. It surpassed Jumanji: Welcome to the Jungle (2017) to become Sony Pictures' highest-grossing film in North America. Based on a final projected worldwide gross of $1.75 billion (a figure that was surpassed), Deadline Hollywood estimated the film's final net profit at $610 million, accounting for production budgets, marketing, talent participations, and other costs versus box office grosses and home media revenues. It returned the global revenue of Cineworld, the world's second-largest cinema operator, to 88% of 2019 levels.

In the United States and Canada, No Way Home earned $121.85 million (which included $50 million from its Thursday night previews) on its opening day, becoming the second-highest opening film after Endgame ($157.4 million) and the highest-opening film for a December release. In its opening weekend, it grossed $260 million, surpassing Infinity War ($257.7 million) to become the second-highest domestic box office opening of all time. As of January 9, 2022, an estimated 54.4 million people have seen No Way Home in theaters in the United States and Canada. The film remained at the top of the box office for three additional weekends until it was dethroned in its fifth weekend by Scream. In its sixth weekend of release, No Way Home reclaimed the top spot at the box office. The film once again held onto the number one spot in its seventh weekend of release. In March 2022, the film surpassed $800 million in the United States and Canada, becoming the third film to do so after Star Wars: The Force Awakens (2015) and Endgame. Comscore Senior Media Analyst Paul Dergarabedian called the film "arguably the most important movie to the movie theater industry ever", as it helped show the viability of the movie theater industry and the benefit of theatrical release windows while the industry recovered from the COVID-19 pandemic. The film dropped to the 11th spot on its 15th weekend. No Way Home returned to first place at the box office, earning $1.8 million on the first day of the release of The More Fun Stuff Version, and went on to finish third with $6.5 million over the four-day Labor Day weekend, finishing behind Top Gun: Maverick (2022) and Bullet Train (2022). It was the highest opening weekend box office gross for a re-released MCU film, surpassing Endgame ($5.5 million) and Far From Home ($4 million).

No Way Home earned $43.6 million from 15 markets on its opening day, with Sony holding the best opening-day record in South Korea, the United Kingdom, Mexico, Italy, and Taiwan. In South Korea, the film grossed $5.28 million on its opening day, thereby beating Far From Home's opening day in the country by over 11% and the biggest day-one figure for any film during the pandemic. In the United Kingdom, the film beat No Time to Die's opening box office record at £7.6 million ($10.1 million). In India, the film's box office on its opening day was ₹320 million (equivalent to ₹390 million or US$4.2 million in 2026) to ₹345 million (equivalent to ₹420 million or US$4.5 million in 2026), beating Endgame and the Indian film Sooryavanshi (2021). In its five-day opening weekend, the film grossed $340.8 million from 60 markets. In Latin America as of January 16, 2022, it became the all-time highest-grossing film in Mexico ($72 million), and the second all-time highest in Brazil ($50.4 million), Central America ($12.6 million) and Ecuador ($7.9 million). As of February 27, 2022, the film's largest markets are the United Kingdom ($127.3 million), Mexico ($76.2 million), Australia ($67.9 million), France ($65.2 million), and South Korea ($63.1 million).

==== Pre-sale ticket records ====
Tickets went on sale the midnight of November 29, 2021, with several ticket websites such as Fandango and AMC Theatres crashing due to the high influx of users attempting to purchase tickets. Ticket sales on Fandango surpassed those for Black Widow in just two hours, and by the end of the day it became the best first-day advance ticket sale since Endgame, while also surpassing the 24-hour ticket sales of Infinity War, Star Wars: The Last Jedi (2017), Far From Home, The Rise of Skywalker and Rogue One (2016). No Way Home had the second-highest one-day ticket sales on AMC, with CEO Adam Aron attributing this to Spider-Man-themed non-fungible tokens (NFTs).

The film also set records in Mexico with $7 million in the first-day ticket sale, which was 40% above Endgame. In the United Kingdom, the film outsold No Time to Die three times in the same twelve-day span before their release, while Brazil's ticket sale was 5% above Endgame at the same point. The film also passed the presale records of The Rise of Skywalker in Poland and No Time to Die in Portugal. Other markets with the best presale records include Spain, Brazil, and Central America.

=== Critical response ===
The review aggregator website Rotten Tomatoes reported an approval rating of 93%, with an average score of 7.9/10, based on 429 reviews. The site's critical consensus reads: "A bigger, bolder Spider-Man sequel, No Way Home expands the franchise's scope and stakes without losing sight of its humor and heart." On Metacritic, the film has a weighted average score of 71 out of 100, based on 60 critics, indicating "generally favorable" reviews. Audiences polled by CinemaScore gave the film a rare "A+" grade on an A+ to F scale, the first live-action Spider-Man film and the fourth MCU film overall to earn the score after The Avengers (2012), Black Panther (2018), and Avengers: Endgame. PostTrak reported 96% of audience members gave it a positive score, with 91% saying they would definitely recommend it.

Amelia Emberwing of IGN gave the film 8 out of 10, stating that its "impact on the universe as a whole, as well as the overall emotional beats, all feel earned" while praising the performances of Dafoe, Molina, and Foxx. Pete Hammond of Deadline Hollywood praised Watts's direction and wrote, "Holland, Zendaya, and Batalon are a priceless trio, and the various villains and 'others' who pop in and out make this pure movie fun of the highest order. Fans will be in heaven". Peter Debruge of Variety praised Garfield's and Maguire's performances and felt the film "provides enough resolution for the past two decades of Spider-Man adventures that audiences who've tuned out along the way will be rewarded for giving this one a shot". Writing for Den of Geek, Don Kaye gave the film 4 out of 5 stars, for its action sequences, performances and chemistry of the cast, stating that "No Way Home channels the entire spectrum of Spider-Man movies while setting the character on a course all his own at last". Jennifer Bisset of CNET praised the action sequences, performances, and story, writing: "A Russo Brothers influence can almost be felt ushering Holland's third Spider-Man movie into new, weightier territory. If the character is to become the next Tony Stark, this is the way to etch a few more scars into a more interesting hero's facade. If you came for the biggest movie of the year, you'll definitely leave satisfied". In a 4 out of 5 review, Sandra Hall of Sydney Morning Hall stated that "it's a form of breaking the fourth wall, inviting the audience in to share a joke with the actors, and verges on parody. Yet somehow they carry it off without diluting our sense of involvement with Peter and those he loves".

Kevin Maher of The Times gave the film 4 out of 5 stars, saying that it was "As satisfying to watch as it is perilous to discuss", and described it as "a dynamite blast of smarty-pants postmodernism that never once abandons its emotional core". Benjamin Lee of The Guardian gave the film 3 out of 5 stars, praising Watts for "bringing back numerous baddies from the previous Spider-Man universes, delivering a propulsive, slickly choreographed adventure that will appease a broad fanbase this Christmas" but feeling that the script "lacks the expected fizz, that sense of shaggy fun struggling to break through a more robotic plot". Kate Erbland of IndieWire gave the film a "B−", feeling that Watts's work was "satisfying, emotional, and occasionally unsteady". She found that the script spent "far too long dwelling on the machinations of people and plans we already know, throwing in some awkward misdirection and simply delaying the inevitable". The Hollywood Reporter's John DeFore felt that the inclusion of "multiversal mayhem" addressed the "Iron Man-ification of the character" that made Holland-centric films "least fun".

CNN's Brian Lowry praised the humor and wrote, "What's already apparent, though, is that this movie was conceived to be savored and enjoyed. And in what has become an increasingly elusive phenomenon, that will include whoops and hollers from appreciative fans in theaters, where Spider-Man will first reveal its secrets, and then, more than likely, shows off its legs." Richard Roeper of Chicago Sun-Times gave the film 3 out of 4 and praised the performances of Holland and Zendaya, writing: "There's nothing new or particularly memorable about the serviceable CGI and practical effects, but we remain invested in the outcome in large part because Holland remains the best of the cinematic Spider-Men, while Zendaya lends heart and smarts and warmth to every moment she's onscreen. We continue to root for these two to make it, even if the multiverse isn't always on their side." In contrast, Bilge Ebiri of Vulture called the film "aggressively mediocre", criticizing the action, comedy and writing, but praising Dafoe – describing him as "once again gets to have some modest fun with his character's divided self" – and Garfield, calling him a "genuine delight" and naming his the film's best performance. Hannah Strong of Little White Lies criticized the film for poor character development particularly regarding Holland's Peter Parker character stating, "It's grating seeing the same character repeatedly fail to learn any lessons or show even a modicum of personal growth". The same review was also generally critical of the film prioritizing fan service over good storytelling.

=== Accolades ===
No Way Home was nominated for an Academy Award, three Visual Effects Society awards (winning one), a Costume Designers Guild Award, a Golden Reel Award, three Nickelodeon Kids' Choice Awards (winning all), five Critics' Choice Super Awards (winning three), and nine Saturn Awards (winning one), among others. The film was disqualified from consideration for the 75th British Academy Film Awards because it was not made available on BAFTA's streaming service, reportedly due to Sony being concerned about piracy. As part of the ceremony's "Oscars Fan Favorite" contest, the three Spider-Men teaming up was one of the five finalists for Oscars Cheer Moment, and the film was the favorite to win the "Fan Favorite" film contest according to a Morning Consult survey. It ended up finishing second and fourth, respectively.

== Future ==
By August 2019, a fourth film in the franchise was in development alongside No Way Home. In November 2021, Pascal said there were plans for another trilogy of Spider-Man films starring Holland, with work on the first of those about to begin. The next month, Feige confirmed that he and Pascal, along with Sony and Disney, were actively beginning to develop the story for the next Spider-Man film following Peter's "momentous decision" at the end of No Way Home. He said that ending was a promise to audiences that they would see Holland as a "proper Spider-Man" for the first time, with the character on his own and fighting street-level crime in New York.

The fourth film, Spider-Man: Brand New Day, was released on July 31, 2026, with Destin Daniel Cretton directing from a screenplay by McKenna and Sommers. Holland, Zendaya, Batalon, and Tomei reprise their roles, with Michael Mando returning as Mac Gargan / Scorpion from Homecoming, while Jon Bernthal, Florence Pugh, and Mark Ruffalo reprise their respective MCU roles as Frank Castle / Punisher, Yelena Belova / Black Widow, and Bruce Banner / Hulk. They are joined by Sadie Sink as Jean Grey and Tramell Tillman as Bill Metzger.
