= List of accolades received by Black Panther (film) =

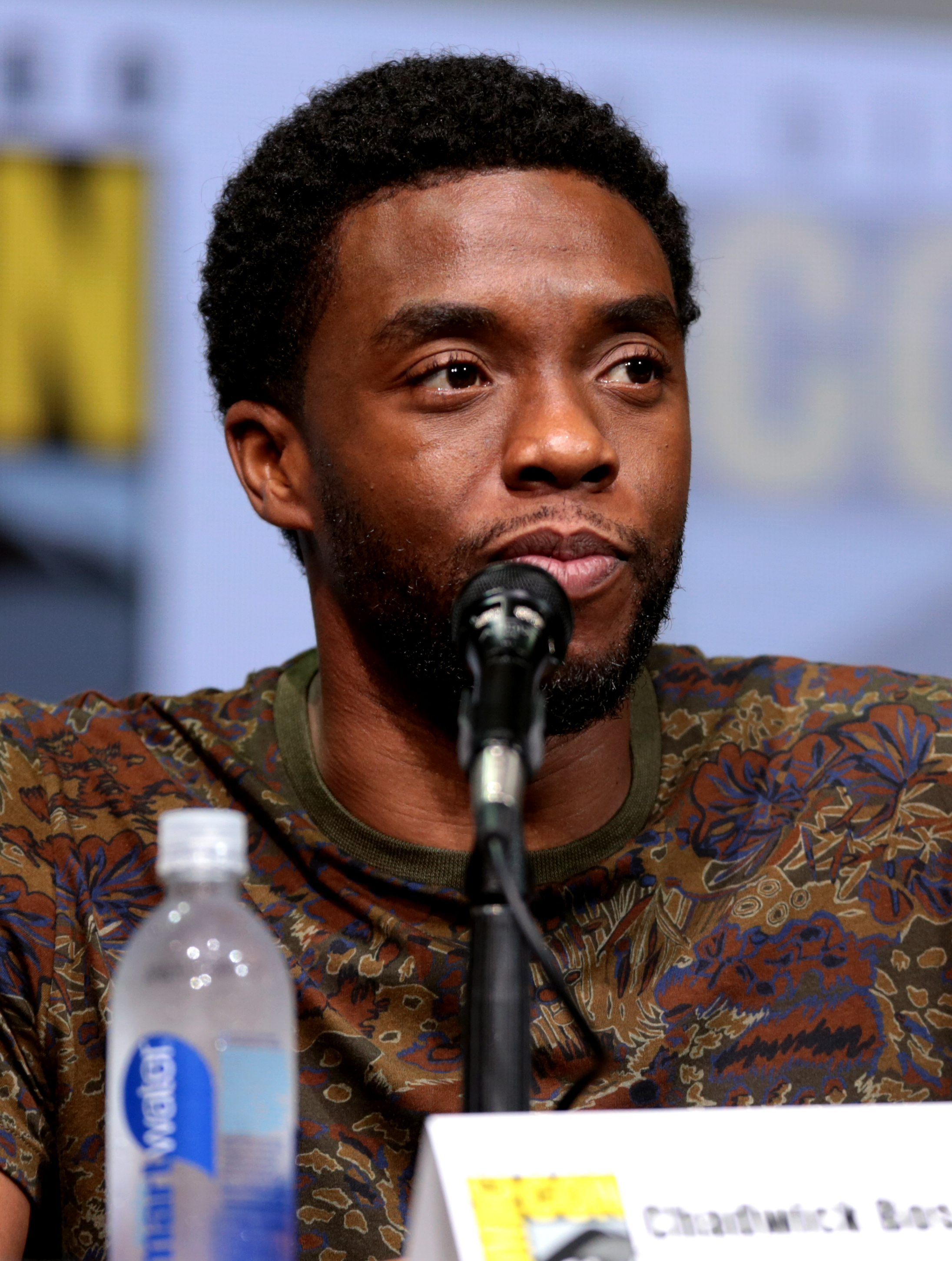
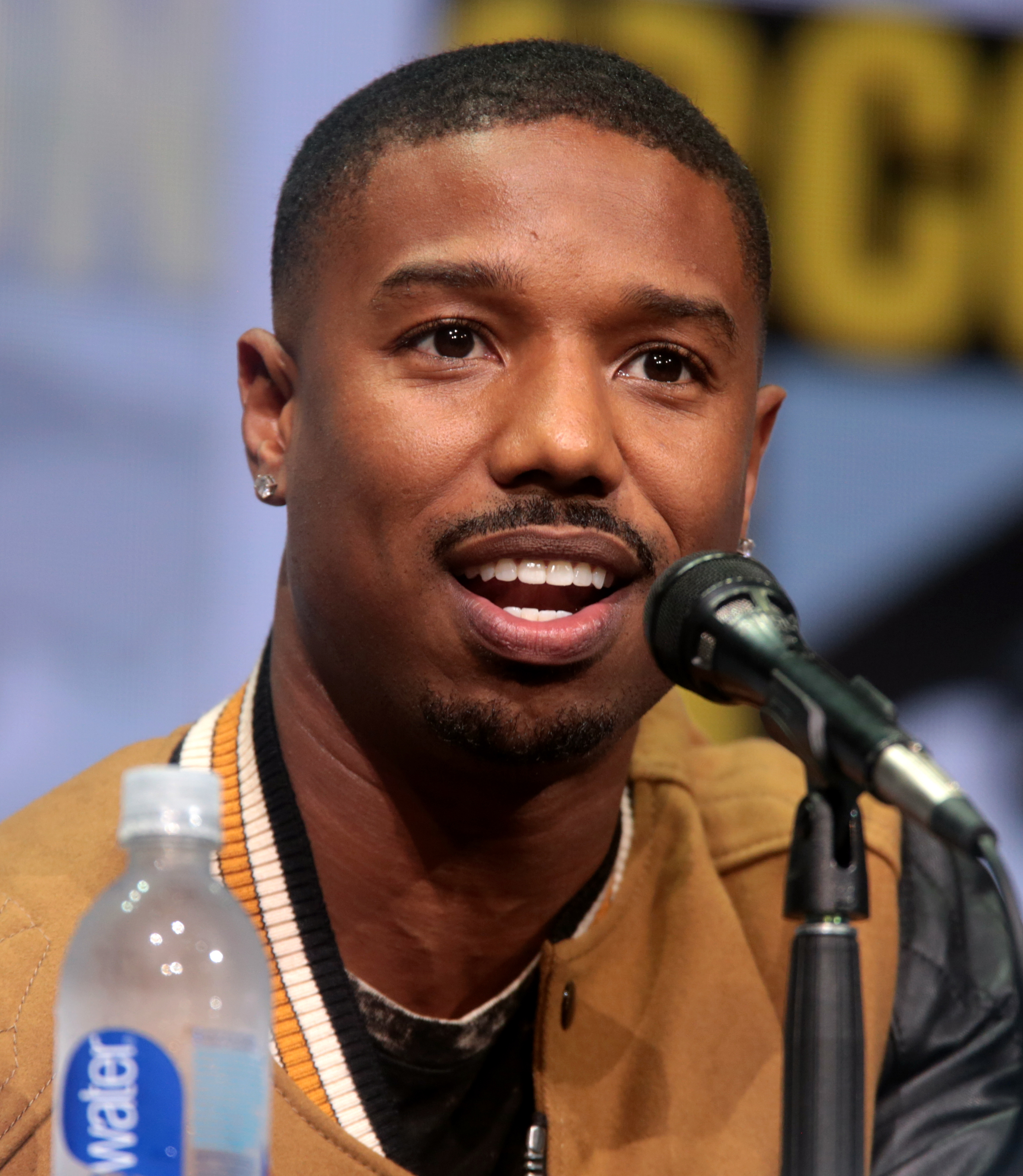
- Chadwick Boseman and Michael B. Jordan received accolades for their performances as T'Challa and Killmonger in Black Panther.
Awards and nominations
Award	Wins	Nominations
AACTA Awards	0	1
AARP Movies for Grownups Awards	0	2
Academy Awards	3	7
African-American Film Critics Association Awards	3	0
Alliance of Women Film Journalists Awards	2	7
American Film Institute Awards	1	0
American Music Awards	1	1
Art Directors Guild Awards	1	1
Austin Film Critics Association Awards	0	3
BET Awards	2	9
Billboard Music Awards	0	1
Black Reel Awards	10	17
British Academy Film Awards	1	1
Casting Society of America	1	1
Costume Designers Guild Awards	1	1
Chicago Film Critics Awards	0	3
Cinema Audio Society Awards	0	1
Critics' Choice Movie Awards	3	12
Dallas–Fort Worth Film Critics Association	0	2
Dorian Awards	0	2
Georgia Film Critics Association	1	7
Golden Globe Awards	0	3
Golden Reel Awards	0	2
Golden Trailer Awards	4	8
Grammy Awards	2	8
Guild of Music Supervisors Awards	0	2
Harvey Awards	1	1
Hollywood Film Awards	2	0
Hollywood Music in Media Awards	3	4
Houston Film Critics Society	0	6
Humanitas Prize	0	1
iHeartRadio Much Music Video Awards	0	2
ICG Publicists Awards	0	1
International Film Music Critics Association	0	3
Juno Awards	0	1
London Film Critics' Circle	0	2
Los Angeles Film Critics Association Awards	1	0
Make-Up Artists and Hair Stylists Guild Awards	0	2
MTV Movie & TV Awards	4	7
MTV Video Music Awards	1	1
NAACP Image Awards	10	16
National Board of Review	1	0
Nebula Award	0	1
Nickelodeon Kids' Choice Awards	0	5
Online Film Critics Society	3	2
Palm Springs International Film Festival	1	0
People's Choice Awards	2	5
Producers Guild of America Awards	0	1
San Diego Film Critics Society	0	2
Santa Barbara International Film Festival	1	0
San Francisco Film Critics Circle	2	4
Satellite Awards	2	7
Saturn Awards	5	14
Screen Actors Guild Awards	2	2
Seattle Film Critics Society	2	7
St. Louis Film Critics Association	1	4
TEC Awards	1	0
Teen Choice Awards	3	11
Toronto Film Critics Association	0	1
USC Scripter Award	0	1
Washington D.C. Area Film Critics Association	1	6
Women Film Critics Circle	2	2
World Soundtrack Awards	1	1
Writers Guild Awards	0	1

Totals (Note: Certain award groups do not simply award one winner. They acknowledge several different recipients, have runners-up, and have third place. Since this is a specific recognition and is different from losing an award, runner-up mentions are considered wins in this award tally. For simplification and to avoid errors, each award in this list has been presumed to have had a prior nomination.)
- Wins: 90
- Nominations: 238

Black Panther is a 2018 American superhero film based on the Marvel Comics character Black Panther. Produced by Marvel Studios and distributed by Walt Disney Studios Motion Pictures, it is the 18th film in the Marvel Cinematic Universe (MCU). The film is directed by Ryan Coogler, who co-wrote the screenplay with Joe Robert Cole, and stars Chadwick Boseman as T'Challa / Black Panther, alongside Michael B. Jordan, Lupita Nyong'o, Danai Gurira, Martin Freeman, Daniel Kaluuya, Letitia Wright, Winston Duke, Angela Bassett, Forest Whitaker, and Andy Serkis. In Black Panther, T'Challa is crowned king of Wakanda following his father's death, but his sovereignty is challenged by Killmonger (Jordan), who plans to abandon the country's isolationist policies and begin a global revolution.

Black Panther had its world premiere at the Dolby Theatre in Los Angeles on January 29, 2018, and was theatrically released in the United States on February 16, as part of Phase Three of the MCU. Produced on a $200 million budget, Black Panther grossed $1.35 billion worldwide. On the review aggregator website Rotten Tomatoes, the film holds an approval rating of 96% based on 526 reviews.

Black Panther garnered awards and nominations in various categories, with recognition for its performances, music, costumes, and production design. At the 91st Academy Awards, the film received seven nominations, including Best Picture, the first such nomination for a superhero film. It went on to win three awards for Best Costume Design, Best Production Design, and Best Original Score; its Academy Award wins were the first for Marvel Studios and an MCU film. Black Panther was nominated for Outstanding Performance by a Stunt Ensemble in a Motion Picture and Outstanding Performance by a Cast in a Motion Picture at the 25th Screen Actors Guild Awards, winning both categories. At the 24th Critics' Choice Awards, the film received twelve nominations, and it ultimately won three awards for Best Costume Design, Best Production Design, and Best Visual Effects. Both the National Board of Review and the American Film Institute named Black Panther one of the Top Ten Films of 2018.

== Accolades ==
Accolades received by Black Panther (film)
Award	Date of ceremony	Category	Recipient(s)	Result	Ref.
AACTA Awards	December 3, 2018	Best Visual Effects Or Animation	Brendan Seals, Michael Perdew, Andrew Zink, and Raphael A. Pimentel	Nominated	
AARP Movies for Grownups Awards	February 15, 2019	Best Ensemble	Black Panther	Nominated	
AARP Movies for Grownups Awards	February 15, 2019	Best Supporting Actress	Angela Bassett	Nominated	
Academy Awards	February 24, 2019	Best Picture	Kevin Feige	Nominated	
Academy Awards	February 24, 2019	Best Costume Design	Ruth E. Carter	Won	
Academy Awards	February 24, 2019	Best Original Score	Ludwig Göransson	Won	
Academy Awards	February 24, 2019	Best Original Song	Kendrick Lamar, Mark "Sounwave" Spears, Anthony "Top Dawg" Tiffith, and SZA for "All the Stars"	Nominated	
Academy Awards	February 24, 2019	Best Production Design	Hannah Beachler and Jay Hart	Won	
Academy Awards	February 24, 2019	Best Sound Editing	Benjamin A. Burtt and Steve Boeddeker	Nominated	
Academy Awards	February 24, 2019	Best Sound Mixing	Peter J. Devlin, Steve Boeddeker, and Brandon Proctor	Nominated	
African-American Film Critics Association Awards	December 11, 2018	Best Picture	Black Panther	Won	
African-American Film Critics Association Awards	December 11, 2018	Best Director	Ryan Coogler	Won	
African-American Film Critics Association Awards	December 11, 2018	Best Song	Kendrick Lamar and SZA for "All the Stars"	Won	
Alliance of Women Film Journalists Awards	January 10, 2019	Best Ensemble Cast – Casting Director	Sarah Finn	Won	
Alliance of Women Film Journalists Awards	January 10, 2019	Best Screenplay, Adapted	Ryan Coogler and Joe Robert Cole	Nominated	
Alliance of Women Film Journalists Awards	January 10, 2019	Best Actor in a Supporting Role	Michael B. Jordan	Nominated	
Alliance of Women Film Journalists Awards	January 10, 2019	Best Cinematography	Rachel Morrison	Nominated	
Alliance of Women Film Journalists Awards	January 10, 2019	Best Editing	Debbie Berman and Michael P. Shawver	Nominated	
Alliance of Women Film Journalists Awards	January 10, 2019	Best Breakthrough Performance	Letitia Wright	Nominated	
Alliance of Women Film Journalists Awards	January 10, 2019	Outstanding Achievement by A Woman in The Film Industry	Rachel Morrison for paving the road for women cinematographers with her Oscar nomination for Mudbound and scoring as DP on Black Panther.	Won	
American Film Institute Awards	January 4, 2019	Top 10 Films of the Year	Black Panther	Won (Note: This award does not have a single winner, but recognizes multiple films.)	
American Music Awards	October 9, 2018	Favorite Soundtrack	Black Panther: The Album	Won	
Art Directors Guild Awards	February 2, 2019	Excellence in Production Design for a Fantasy Film	Hannah Beachler	Won	
Austin Film Critics Association Awards	January 7, 2019	Best Supporting Actor	Michael B. Jordan	Nominated	
Austin Film Critics Association Awards	January 7, 2019	Best Ensemble	Black Panther	Nominated	
Austin Film Critics Association Awards	January 7, 2019	Best Stunts	Black Panther	Nominated	
BET Awards	June 24, 2018	Best Movie	Black Panther	Won	
BET Awards	June 24, 2018	Album of the Year	Black Panther: The Album	Nominated	
BET Awards	June 24, 2018	Best Actor	Chadwick Boseman	Won	
BET Awards	June 24, 2018	Best Actor	Sterling K. Brown	Nominated	
BET Awards	June 24, 2018	Best Actor	Michael B. Jordan	Nominated	
BET Awards	June 24, 2018	Best Actor	Daniel Kaluuya	Nominated	
BET Awards	June 24, 2018	Best Actress	Angela Bassett	Nominated	
BET Awards	June 24, 2018	Best Actress	Lupita Nyong'o	Nominated	
BET Awards	June 24, 2018	Best Actress	Letitia Wright	Nominated	
Billboard Music Awards	May 20, 2018	Top Soundtrack	Black Panther: The Album	Nominated	
Black Reel Awards	February 7, 2019	Outstanding Motion Picture	Black Panther	Won	
Black Reel Awards	February 7, 2019	Outstanding Ensemble	Black Panther	Won	
Black Reel Awards	February 7, 2019	Outstanding Actor	Chadwick Boseman	Won	
Black Reel Awards	February 7, 2019	Outstanding Director	Ryan Coogler	Won	
Black Reel Awards	February 7, 2019	Outstanding Supporting Actor	Michael B. Jordan	Won	
Black Reel Awards	February 7, 2019	Outstanding Supporting Actress	Danai Gurira	Nominated	
Black Reel Awards	February 7, 2019	Outstanding Supporting Actress	Lupita Nyong'o	Nominated	
Black Reel Awards	February 7, 2019	Outstanding Supporting Actress	Letitia Wright	Nominated	
Black Reel Awards	February 7, 2019	Outstanding Screenplay	Ryan Coogler and Joe Robert Cole	Nominated	
Black Reel Awards	February 7, 2019	Outstanding Score	Ludwig Göransson	Nominated	
Black Reel Awards	February 7, 2019	Outstanding Original Song	Kendrick Lamar and SZA for "All the Stars"	Won	
Black Reel Awards	February 7, 2019	Outstanding Original Song	The Weeknd and Kendrick Lamar for "Pray for Me"	Nominated	
Black Reel Awards	February 7, 2019	Outstanding Breakthrough Performance, Male	Winston Duke	Won	
Black Reel Awards	February 7, 2019	Outstanding Breakthrough Performance, Female	Letitia Wright	Won	
Black Reel Awards	February 7, 2019	Outstanding Cinematography	Rachel Morrison	Nominated	
Black Reel Awards	February 7, 2019	Outstanding Costume Design	Ruth E. Carter	Won	
Black Reel Awards	February 7, 2019	Outstanding Production Design	Hannah Beachler	Won	
British Academy Film Awards	February 10, 2019	Best Visual Effects	Geoffrey Baumann, Jesse James Chisholm, Craig Hammack, and Dan Sudick	Won	
Casting Society of America	January 31, 2019	The Zeitgeist Award	Black Panther – Sarah Halley Finn, Meagan Lewis (Location Casting), Jason B. Stamey (Associate), and Nicholas Amick Mudd (Associate)	Won	
Chicago Film Critics Awards	December 8, 2018	Best Supporting Actor	Michael B. Jordan	Nominated	
Chicago Film Critics Awards	December 8, 2018	Best Art Direction	Hannah Beachler and Jay Hart	Nominated	
Chicago Film Critics Awards	December 8, 2018	Best Visual Effects	Geoffrey Baumann, Jesse James Chisholm, Craig Hammack, and Dan Sudick	Nominated	
Cinema Audio Society Awards	February 16, 2019	Motion Picture – Live Action	Peter Devlin (Production Mixer), Steven Boeddeker (Re-recording Mixer), Brandon Proctor (Re-recording Mixer), Christopher Foge (Scoring Mixer), Doc Kane (ADR Mixer), and Scott Curtis (Foley Mixer)	Nominated	
Costume Designers Guild Awards	February 19, 2019	Excellence in Sci-Fi/Fantasy Film	Ruth E. Carter	Won	
Critics' Choice Movie Awards	January 13, 2019	Best Picture	Black Panther	Nominated	
Critics' Choice Movie Awards	January 13, 2019	Best Action Movie	Black Panther	Nominated	
Critics' Choice Movie Awards	January 13, 2019	Best Acting Ensemble	Black Panther	Nominated	
Critics' Choice Movie Awards	January 13, 2019	Best Supporting Actor	Michael B. Jordan	Nominated	
Critics' Choice Movie Awards	January 13, 2019	Best Adapted Screenplay	Ryan Coogler and Joe Robert Cole	Nominated	
Critics' Choice Movie Awards	January 13, 2019	Best Cinematography	Rachel Morrison	Nominated	
Critics' Choice Movie Awards	January 13, 2019	Best Art Direction	Hannah Beachler and Jay Hart	Won	
Critics' Choice Movie Awards	January 13, 2019	Best Costume Design	Ruth E. Carter	Won	
Critics' Choice Movie Awards	January 13, 2019	Best Hair and Make Up	Camille Friend, Joel Harlow, and Ken Diaz	Nominated	
Critics' Choice Movie Awards	January 13, 2019	Best Visual Effects	Geoffrey Baumann, Jesse James Chisholm, Craig Hammack, and Dan Sudick	Won	
Critics' Choice Movie Awards	January 13, 2019	Best Song	"All the Stars" – Kendrick Lamar and SZA	Nominated	
Critics' Choice Movie Awards	January 13, 2019	Best Score	Ludwig Göransson	Nominated	
Dallas–Fort Worth Film Critics Association	December 17, 2018	Top 10 Films	Black Panther	6th place	
Dallas–Fort Worth Film Critics Association	December 17, 2018	Best Supporting Actor	Michael B. Jordan	Nominated	
Dorian Awards	January 12, 2019	Film Performance of the Year – Supporting Actor	Michael B. Jordan	Nominated	
Dorian Awards	January 12, 2019	Visually Striking Film of the Year	Black Panther	Nominated	
Dragon Awards	September 4, 2018	Best Science Fiction or Fantasy Movie	Black Panther	Won	
Georgia Film Critics Association	January 11, 2019	Oglethorpe Award for Excellence in Georgia Cinema	Black Panther – Ryan Coogler and Joe Robert Cole	Won	
Georgia Film Critics Association	January 11, 2019	Best Ensemble	Black Panther	Nominated	
Georgia Film Critics Association	January 11, 2019	Best Adapted Screenplay	Joe Robert Cole and Ryan Coogler	Nominated	
Georgia Film Critics Association	January 11, 2019	Best Cinematography	Rachel Morrison	Nominated	
Georgia Film Critics Association	January 11, 2019	Best Production Design	Hannah Beachler and Jay Hart	Nominated	
Georgia Film Critics Association	January 11, 2019	Best Original Score	Ludwig Göransson	Nominated	
Georgia Film Critics Association	January 11, 2019	Best Original Song	"All the Stars" – Kendrick Lamar and SZA	Nominated	
Golden Globe Awards	January 6, 2019	Best Motion Picture – Drama	Black Panther	Nominated	
Golden Globe Awards	January 6, 2019	Best Original Score	Ludwig Göransson	Nominated	
Golden Globe Awards	January 6, 2019	Best Original Song	"All the Stars" – Kendrick Lamar and SZA	Nominated	
Golden Reel Awards	February 18, 2019	Feature Film – Music Underscore	Black Panther	Nominated	
Golden Reel Awards	February 18, 2019	Feature Film – Effects/Foley	Black Panther	Nominated	
Golden Trailer Awards	May 31, 2018	Best of Show	"Crown" (Create Advertising Group)	Won	
Golden Trailer Awards	May 31, 2018	Best Action	"Crown" (Create Advertising Group)	Won	
Golden Trailer Awards	May 31, 2018	Best Action TV Spot	"Entourage: 60" (AV Squad)	Won	
Golden Trailer Awards	May 31, 2018	Best Music TV Spot (for a Feature Film)	"Women of Wakanda" (Tiny Hero)	Won	
Golden Trailer Awards	May 31, 2018	Best Sound Editing in a TV Spot (for a Feature Film)	"Team" (Tiny Hero)	Nominated	
Golden Trailer Awards	May 31, 2018	Best Billboard	"Arclight Motion Billboard" (The M Factor)	Nominated	
Golden Trailer Awards	May 31, 2018	Best Radio / Audio Spot	"Just Getting Started" (Tiny Hero)	Nominated	
Golden Trailer Awards	May 31, 2018	Best Wildposts (Teaser Campaign)	"Character Series" (Art Machine)	Nominated	
Grammy Awards	February 10, 2019	Album of the Year	Black Panther: The Album	Nominated	
Grammy Awards	February 10, 2019	Song of the Year	"All the Stars" – Kendrick Lamar and SZA	Nominated	
Grammy Awards	February 10, 2019	Record of the Year	"All the Stars" – Kendrick Lamar and SZA	Nominated	
Grammy Awards	February 10, 2019	Best Rap/Sung Performance	"All the Stars" – Kendrick Lamar and SZA	Nominated	
Grammy Awards	February 10, 2019	Best Song Written For Visual Media	"All the Stars" – Kendrick Lamar and SZA	Nominated	
Grammy Awards	February 10, 2019	Best Rap Performance	"King's Dead" – Kendrick Lamar, Jay Rock, Future, and James Blake	Won	
Grammy Awards	February 10, 2019	Best Rap Song	"King's Dead" – Kendrick Lamar, Jay Rock, Future, and James Blake	Nominated	
Grammy Awards	February 10, 2019	Best Score Soundtrack For Visual Media	Ludwig Göransson	Won	
Guild of Music Supervisors Awards	February 13, 2019	Best Music Supervision for Films Budgeted Over $25 Million	Dave Jordan	Nominated	
Guild of Music Supervisors Awards	February 13, 2019	Best Song/Recording Created for a Film	"All the Stars" – Kendrick Lamar and SZA (Music Supervisor: Dave Jordan)	Nominated	
Harvey Awards	October 5, 2018	Best Adaptation From a Comic	Black Panther, directed by Ryan Coogler. Adapted from Black Panther (Marvel Comics)	Won	
Hollywood Film Awards	November 4, 2018	Film	Black Panther	Won	
Hollywood Film Awards	November 4, 2018	Production Design	Hannah Beachler	Won	
Hollywood Music in Media Awards	November 14, 2018	Soundtrack Album	Black Panther: The Album	Won	
Hollywood Music in Media Awards	November 14, 2018	Original Score – Sci-Fi/Fantasy/Horror Film	Ludwig Göransson	Won	
Hollywood Music in Media Awards	November 14, 2018	Original Song – Sci-Fi/Fantasy/Horror Film	"All the Stars" – Kendrick Lamar and SZA (Written by Kendrick Duckworth, Solána I Rowe, Mark Spears, and Al Shux)	Won	
Hollywood Music in Media Awards	November 14, 2018	Outstanding Music Supervision – Film	Dave Jordan	Nominated	
Houston Film Critics Society	January 3, 2019	Best Picture	Black Panther	Nominated	
Houston Film Critics Society	January 3, 2019	Best Supporting Actor	Michael B. Jordan	Nominated	
Houston Film Critics Society	January 3, 2019	Best Cinematography	Rachel Morrison	Nominated	
Houston Film Critics Society	January 3, 2019	Best Score	Ludwig Göransson	Nominated	
Houston Film Critics Society	January 3, 2019	Best Song	"All the Stars" – Kendrick Lamar and SZA	Nominated	
Houston Film Critics Society	January 3, 2019	Best Visual Effects	Geoffrey Baumann, Jesse James Chisholm, Craig Hammack, and Dan Sudick	Nominated	
Humanitas Prize	February 8, 2019	Drama Feature Film	Black Panther	Nominated	
iHeartRadio Much Music Video Awards	August 26, 2018	Best Collaboration	"All the Stars" – Kendrick Lamar and SZA	Nominated	
iHeartRadio Much Music Video Awards	August 26, 2018	Best Collaboration	"Pray for Me" – The Weeknd and Kendrick Lamar	Nominated	
ICG Publicists Awards	February 22, 2019	Maxwell Weinberg Publicist Showmanship of the Year – Motion Picture	Black Panther	Nominated	
International Film Music Critics Association	February 21, 2019	Composer of the Year	Ludwig Göransson	Nominated	
International Film Music Critics Association	February 21, 2019	Score of the Year	Ludwig Göransson	Nominated	
International Film Music Critics Association	February 21, 2019	Best Original Score – Fantasy/Science Fiction/Horror Film	Ludwig Göransson	Nominated	
Juno Awards	March 17, 2019	Single of the Year	"Pray for Me" – The Weeknd and Kendrick Lamar	Nominated	
London Film Critics' Circle	January 20, 2019	Best Supporting Actor of the Year	Michael B. Jordan	Nominated	
London Film Critics' Circle	January 20, 2019	British/Irish Actor of the Year	Daniel Kaluuya	Nominated	
Los Angeles Film Critics Association	January 12, 2019	Best Production Design	Hannah Beachler	Won	
Make-Up Artists and Hair Stylists Guild Awards	February 16, 2019	Best Period and/or Character Hair Styling	Camille Friend, Jaime Leigh McIntosh, and Louisa Anthony	Nominated	
Make-Up Artists and Hair Stylists Guild Awards	February 16, 2019	Best Special Make-Up Effects in a Feature-Length Motion Picture	Joel Harlow, Ken Diaz, and Sian Richards	Nominated	
MTV Movie & TV Awards	June 16, 2018	Movie of the Year	Black Panther	Won	
MTV Movie & TV Awards	June 16, 2018	Best Actor	Chadwick Boseman	Won	
MTV Movie & TV Awards	June 16, 2018	Best Hero	Chadwick Boseman	Won	
MTV Movie & TV Awards	June 16, 2018	Best Villain	Michael B. Jordan	Won	
MTV Movie & TV Awards	June 16, 2018	Best Scene Stealer	Letitia Wright	Nominated	
MTV Movie & TV Awards	June 16, 2018	Best Fight	Chadwick Boseman vs. Winston Duke	Nominated	
MTV Movie & TV Awards	June 16, 2018	Best On-Screen Team	Chadwick Boseman, Lupita Nyong'o, Danai Gurira, and Letitia Wright	Nominated	
MTV Video Music Awards	August 20, 2018	Best Visual Effects	"All the Stars" – Kendrick Lamar and SZA (Loris Paillier for BUF Paris)	Won	
NAACP Image Awards	March 30, 2019	Outstanding Motion Picture	Black Panther	Won	
NAACP Image Awards	March 30, 2019	Outstanding Ensemble Cast in a Motion Picture	Black Panther	Won	
NAACP Image Awards	March 30, 2019	Entertainer of the Year	Ryan Coogler	Nominated	
NAACP Image Awards	March 30, 2019	Outstanding Directing in a Motion Picture (Film)	Ryan Coogler	Won	
NAACP Image Awards	March 30, 2019	Outstanding Writing in a Motion Picture (Film)	Ryan Coogler and Joe Robert Cole	Won	
NAACP Image Awards	March 30, 2019	Outstanding Actor in a Motion Picture	Chadwick Boseman	Won	
NAACP Image Awards	March 30, 2019	Outstanding Supporting Actor in a Motion Picture	Michael B. Jordan	Won	
NAACP Image Awards	March 30, 2019	Outstanding Supporting Actor in a Motion Picture	Winston Duke	Nominated	
NAACP Image Awards	March 30, 2019	Outstanding Supporting Actress in a Motion Picture	Lupita Nyong'o	Nominated	
NAACP Image Awards	March 30, 2019	Outstanding Supporting Actress in a Motion Picture	Danai Gurira	Won	
NAACP Image Awards	March 30, 2019	Outstanding Supporting Actress in a Motion Picture	Letitia Wright	Nominated	
NAACP Image Awards	March 30, 2019	Outstanding Breakthrough Performance in a Motion Picture	Letitia Wright	Won	
NAACP Image Awards	March 30, 2019	Outstanding Breakthrough Performance in a Motion Picture	Winston Duke	Nominated	
NAACP Image Awards	March 30, 2019	Outstanding Duo, Group or Collaboration	"All the Stars" – Kendrick Lamar and SZA	Won	
NAACP Image Awards	March 30, 2019	Outstanding Music Video/Visual Album	"All the Stars" – Kendrick Lamar and SZA	Nominated	
NAACP Image Awards	March 30, 2019	Outstanding Soundtrack/Compilation	Black Panther: The Album	Won	
National Board of Review Awards	January 8, 2019	Top Ten Films	Black Panther	Won	
Nebula Award	May 18, 2019	Ray Bradbury Award for Outstanding Dramatic Presentation	Black Panther – Ryan Coogler and Joe Robert Cole	Nominated	
Nickelodeon Kids' Choice Awards	March 23, 2019	Favorite Movie	Black Panther	Nominated	
Nickelodeon Kids' Choice Awards	March 23, 2019	Favorite Movie Actor	Chadwick Boseman	Nominated	
Nickelodeon Kids' Choice Awards	March 23, 2019	Favorite Superhero	Chadwick Boseman	Nominated	
Nickelodeon Kids' Choice Awards	March 23, 2019	Favorite Movie Actress	Lupita Nyong'o	Nominated	
Nickelodeon Kids' Choice Awards	March 23, 2019	Favorite Butt-Kicker	Danai Gurira	Nominated	
Online Film Critics Society	January 2, 2019	Special Achievement Award	Ryan Coogler for "Black Panther's distinctive critical and box office appeal."	Won	
Online Film Critics Society	January 2, 2019	Best Supporting Actor	Michael B. Jordan	Won	
Online Film Critics Society	January 2, 2019	Best Costume Design	Ruth E. Carter	Won	
Online Film Critics Society	January 2, 2019	Best Original Score	Ludwig Göransson	Nominated	
Palm Springs International Film Festival	January 4, 2019	Creative Impact in Directing Award	Ryan Coogler	Won	
People's Choice Awards	November 11, 2018	Movie of the Year	Black Panther	Nominated	
People's Choice Awards	November 11, 2018	Action Movie of the Year	Black Panther	Nominated	
People's Choice Awards	November 11, 2018	Male Movie Star of the Year	Chadwick Boseman	Won	
People's Choice Awards	November 11, 2018	Action Movie Star of the Year	Chadwick Boseman	Nominated	
People's Choice Awards	November 11, 2018	Action Movie Star of the Year	Danai Gurira	Won	
Producers Guild of America Awards	January 19, 2019	Best Theatrical Motion Picture	Kevin Feige	Nominated	
San Diego Film Critics Society	December 10, 2018	Best Production Design	Hannah Beachler	Nominated	
San Diego Film Critics Society	December 10, 2018	Best Visual Effects	Geoffrey Baumann, Jesse James Chisholm, Craig Hammack, and Dan Sudick	Nominated	
Santa Barbara International Film Festival	February 7, 2019	Cinema Vanguard Award	Michael B. Jordan	Won	
San Francisco Film Critics Circle	December 9, 2018	Best Supporting Actor	Michael B. Jordan	Won	
San Francisco Film Critics Circle	December 9, 2018	Best Adapted Screenplay	Ryan Coogler and Joe Robert Cole	Nominated	
San Francisco Film Critics Circle	December 9, 2018	Best Production Design	Hannah Beachler	Won	
San Francisco Film Critics Circle	December 9, 2018	Best Original Score	Ludwig Göransson	Nominated	
Satellite Awards	February 17, 2019	Auteur Award	Ryan Coogler	Won	
Satellite Awards	February 17, 2019	Best Film	Black Panther	Nominated	
Satellite Awards	February 17, 2019	Best Original Song	"All the Stars" – Kendrick Lamar and SZA	Nominated	
Satellite Awards	February 17, 2019	Best Cinematography	Rachel Morrison	Nominated	
Satellite Awards	February 17, 2019	Best Costume Design	Ruth E. Carter	Nominated	
Satellite Awards	February 17, 2019	Best Art Direction and Production Design	Hannah Beachler and Jay Hart	Nominated	
Satellite Awards	February 17, 2019	Best Visual Effects	Geoffrey Baumann, Jesse James Chisholm, Craig Hammack, and Dan Sudick	Won	
Satellite Awards	February 17, 2019	Best Sound	Peter J. Devlin, Steve Boeddeker, Brandon Proctor, Christopher Foge, Doc Kane, and Scott Curtis	Nominated	
Saturn Awards	June 27, 2018	Best Comic-to-Motion Picture Release	Black Panther	Won	
Saturn Awards	June 27, 2018	Best Actor in a Film	Chadwick Boseman	Nominated	
Saturn Awards	June 27, 2018	Best Actress in a Film	Lupita Nyong'o	Nominated	
Saturn Awards	June 27, 2018	Best Supporting Actor in a Film	Michael B. Jordan	Nominated	
Saturn Awards	June 27, 2018	Best Supporting Actress in a Film	Danai Gurira	Won	
Saturn Awards	June 27, 2018	Best Performance by a Younger Actor in a Film	Letitia Wright	Nominated	
Saturn Awards	June 27, 2018	Best Film Director	Ryan Coogler	Won	
Saturn Awards	June 27, 2018	Best Film Screenplay	Ryan Coogler and Joe Robert Cole	Nominated	
Saturn Awards	June 27, 2018	Best Film Production Design	Hannah Beachler	Won	
Saturn Awards	June 27, 2018	Best Film Editing	Michael P. Shawver and Claudia Castello	Nominated	
Saturn Awards	June 27, 2018	Best Film Music	Ludwig Göransson	Nominated	
Saturn Awards	June 27, 2018	Best Film Costume Designer	Ruth E. Carter	Nominated	
Saturn Awards	June 27, 2018	Best Film Make-Up	Joel Harlow and Ken Diaz	Won	
Saturn Awards	June 27, 2018	Best Film Special / Visual Effects	Geoffrey Baumann, Jesse James Chisholm, Craig Hammack, and Dan Sudick	Nominated	
Screen Actors Guild Awards	January 27, 2019	Outstanding Performance by a Cast in a Motion Picture	Black Panther – Angela Bassett, Chadwick Boseman, Sterling K. Brown, Winston Duke, Martin Freeman, Danai Gurira, Michael B. Jordan, Daniel Kaluuya, Lupita Nyong'o, Andy Serkis, Forest Whitaker, and Letitia Wright	Won	
Screen Actors Guild Awards	January 27, 2019	Outstanding Performance by a Stunt Ensemble in a Motion Picture	Black Panther	Won	
Seattle Film Critics Society	December 17, 2018	Best Picture of the Year	Black Panther	Nominated	
Seattle Film Critics Society	December 17, 2018	Best Ensemble	Black Panther	Nominated	
Seattle Film Critics Society	December 17, 2018	Best Supporting Actor	Michael B. Jordan	Nominated	
Seattle Film Critics Society	December 17, 2018	Villain of the Year	Michael B. Jordan	Won	
Seattle Film Critics Society	December 17, 2018	Best Production Design	Hannah Beachler	Nominated	
Seattle Film Critics Society	December 17, 2018	Best Costume Design	Ruth E. Carter	Won	
Seattle Film Critics Society	December 17, 2018	Best Visual Effects	Geoffrey Baumann, Jesse James Chisholm, Craig Hammack, and Dan Sudick	Nominated	
St. Louis Film Critics Association	December 16, 2018	Best Action Film	Black Panther	Nominated	
St. Louis Film Critics Association	December 16, 2018	Best Supporting Actor	Michael B. Jordan	Nominated	
St. Louis Film Critics Association	December 16, 2018	Best Production Design	Hannah Beachler	Won	
St. Louis Film Critics Association	December 16, 2018	Best Visual/Special Effects	Geoffrey Baumann, Jesse James Chisholm, Craig Hammack, and Dan Sudick	Nominated	
TEC Awards	January 26, 2019	Film Sound Production	Black Panther	Won	
Teen Choice Awards	August 12, 2018	Choice Sci-Fi Movie	Black Panther	Won	
Teen Choice Awards	August 12, 2018	Choice Sci-Fi Movie Actor	Chadwick Boseman	Nominated	
Teen Choice Awards	August 12, 2018	Choice Sci-Fi Movie Actress	Lupita Nyong'o	Nominated	
Teen Choice Awards	August 12, 2018	Choice Sci-Fi Movie Actress	Letitia Wright	Won	
Teen Choice Awards	August 12, 2018	Choice Sci-Fi Movie Actress	Danai Gurira	Nominated	
Teen Choice Awards	August 12, 2018	Choice Collaboration	"Pray for Me" – The Weeknd and Kendrick Lamar	Nominated	
Teen Choice Awards	August 12, 2018	Choice Villain	Michael B. Jordan	Won	
Teen Choice Awards	August 12, 2018	Choice Breakout	Letitia Wright	Nominated	
Teen Choice Awards	August 12, 2018	Choice Liplock	Chadwick Boseman and Lupita Nyong'o	Nominated	
Teen Choice Awards	August 12, 2018	Choice Movie Ship	Chadwick Boseman and Lupita Nyong'o	Nominated	
Teen Choice Awards	August 12, 2018	Choice R&B/Hip-Hop Song	"All the Stars" – Kendrick Lamar and SZA	Nominated	
Toronto Film Critics Association	December 10, 2018	Best Supporting Actor	Michael B. Jordan	Nominated	
USC Scripter Award	February 9, 2019	Best Adapted Screenplay	Black Panther – Ryan Coogler and Joe Robert Cole	Nominated	
Washington D.C. Area Film Critics Association	December 3, 2018	Best Director	Ryan Coogler	Nominated	
Washington D.C. Area Film Critics Association	December 3, 2018	Best Supporting Actor	Michael B. Jordan	Nominated	
Washington D.C. Area Film Critics Association	December 3, 2018	Best Ensemble	Black Panther	Nominated	
Washington D.C. Area Film Critics Association	December 3, 2018	Best Adapted Screenplay	Ryan Coogler and Joe Robert Cole	Nominated	
Washington D.C. Area Film Critics Association	December 3, 2018	Best Art Direction	Hannah Beachler and Jay Hart	Won	
Washington D.C. Area Film Critics Association	December 3, 2018	Best Score	Ludwig Göransson	Nominated	
Women Film Critics Circle	December 11, 2018	Best Action Female Heroes	Black Panther	Won	
Women Film Critics Circle	December 11, 2018	Best Equality of the Sexes	Black Panther	Won	
World Soundtrack Awards	October 17, 2018	Best Original Song Written Directly for a Film	"Black Panther" – Kendrick Lamar (Music and lyrics by Kendrick Duckworth, Kevin Gomringer, Tim Gomringer, Solána I Rowe, Matt Schaeffer, Mark Anthony Spears, and Anthony Tiffith)	Won	
Writers Guild of America Awards	February 17, 2019	Best Adapted Screenplay	Joe Robert Cole and Ryan Coogler	Nominated	
