= 2018 Seattle Film Critics Society Awards =

Annual US film awards ceremony

3rd Seattle Film Critics Society Awards
- Date: December 17, 2018
- Site: Seattle, Washington

Highlights
- Best Picture: Roma
- Most awards: Roma (4)
- Most nominations: The Favourite (11)

The 3rd Seattle Film Critics Society Awards were announced on December 17, 2018.

The nominations were announced on December 10, 2018.

== Winners and nominees ==
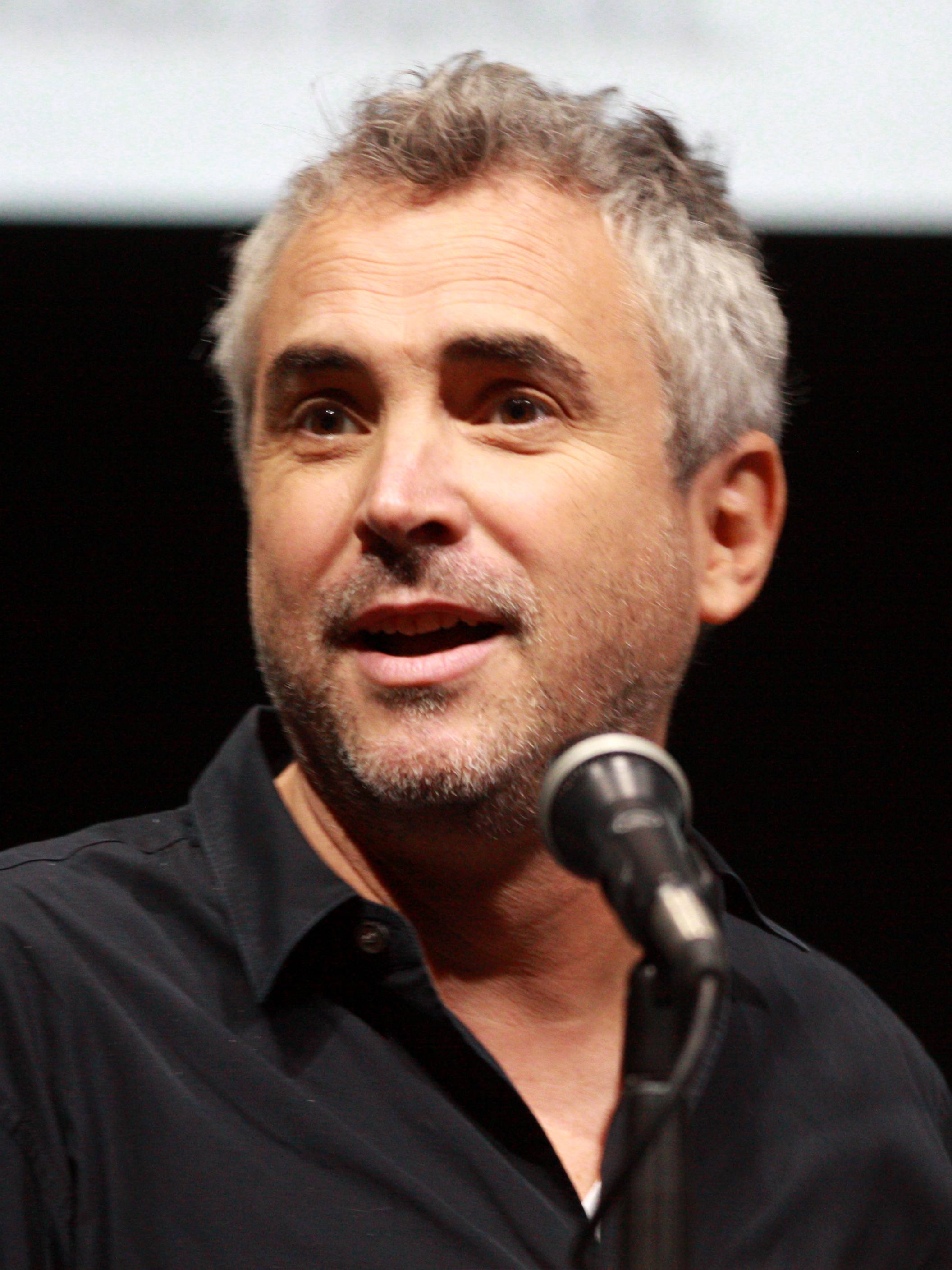
Alfonso Cuarón, Best Director, Best Foreign Language Film and Best Cinematography winner

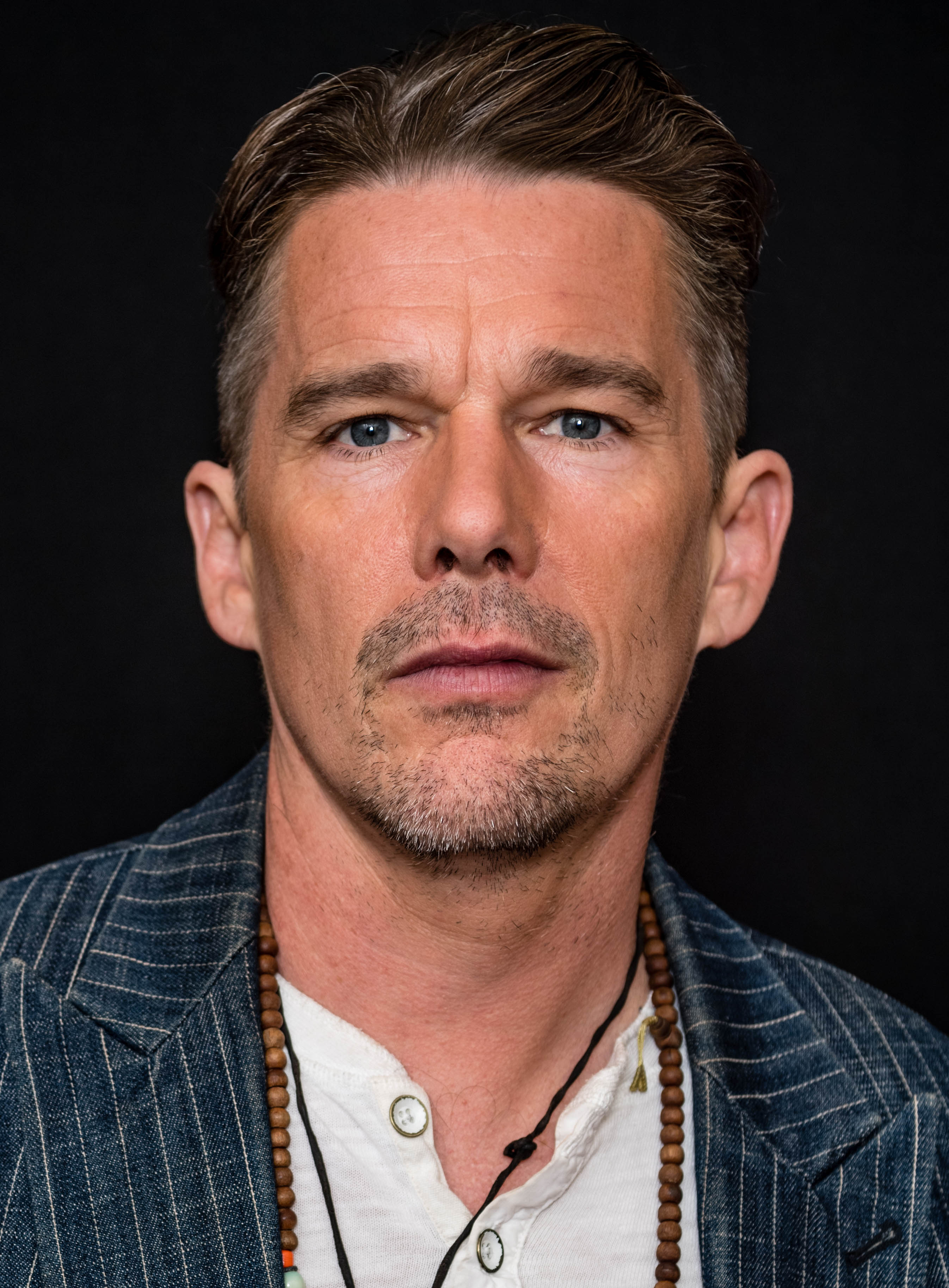
Ethan Hawke, Best Actor in a Leading Role winner

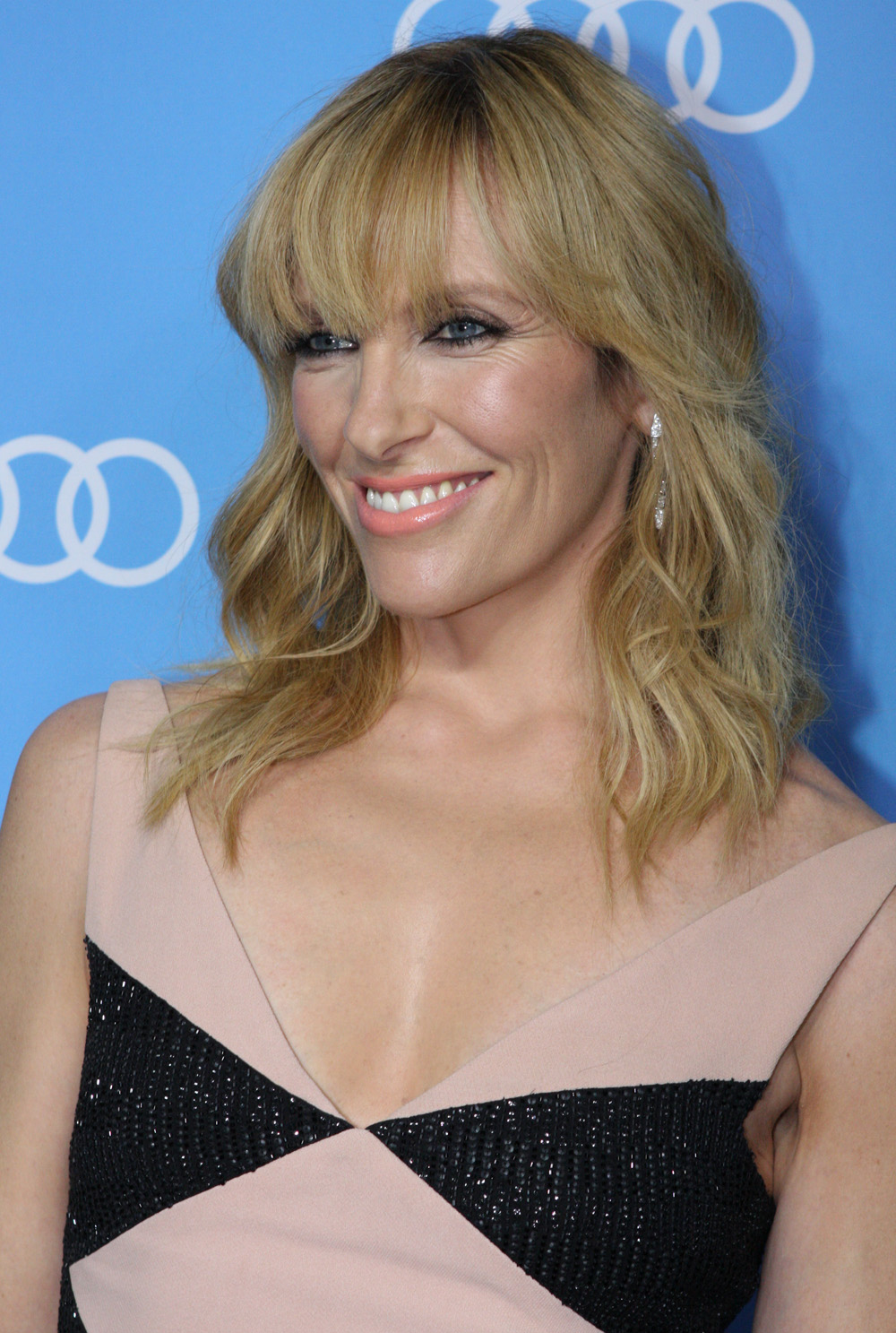
Toni Collette, Best Actress in a Leading Role winner

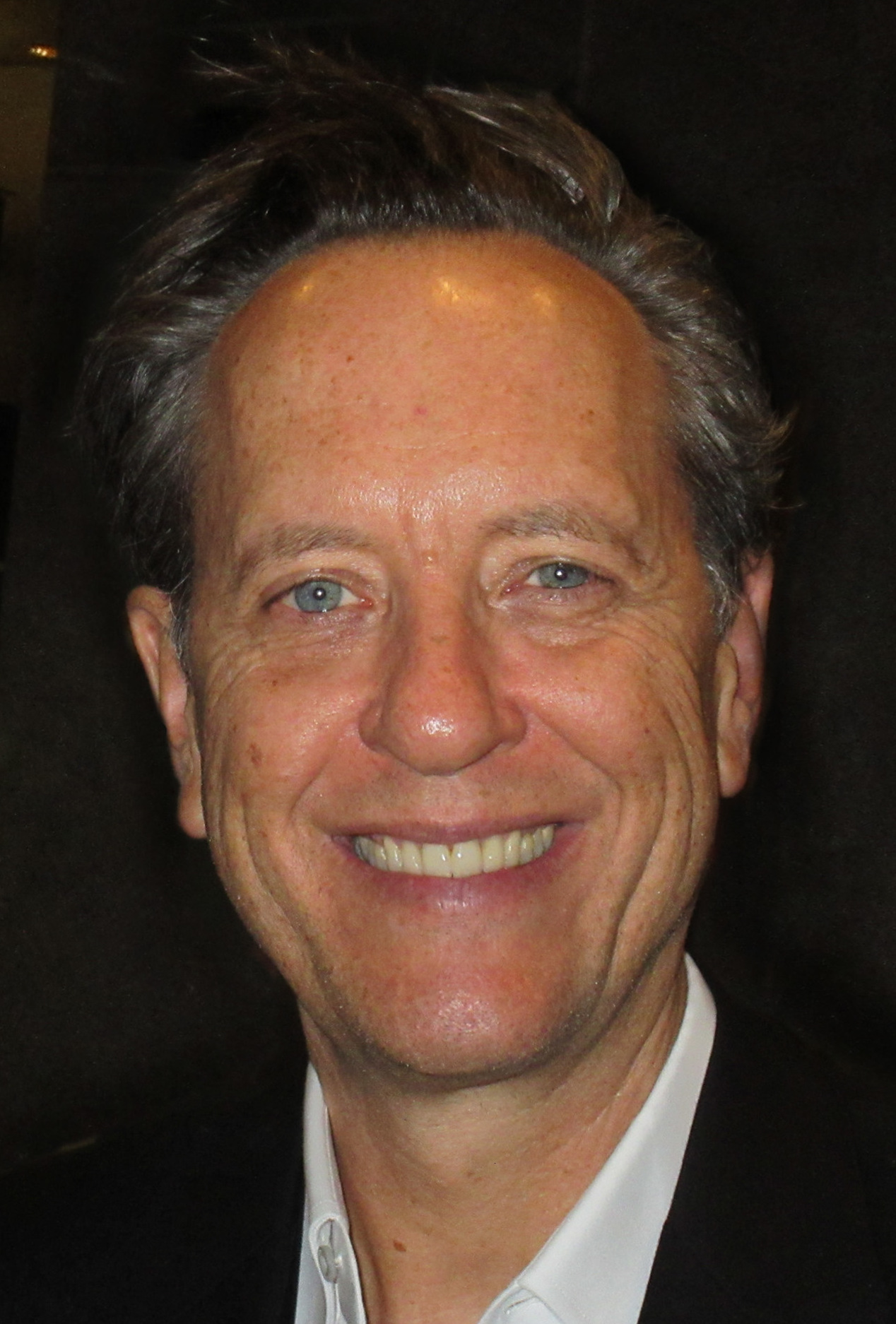
Richard E. Grant, Best Actor in a Supporting Role winner

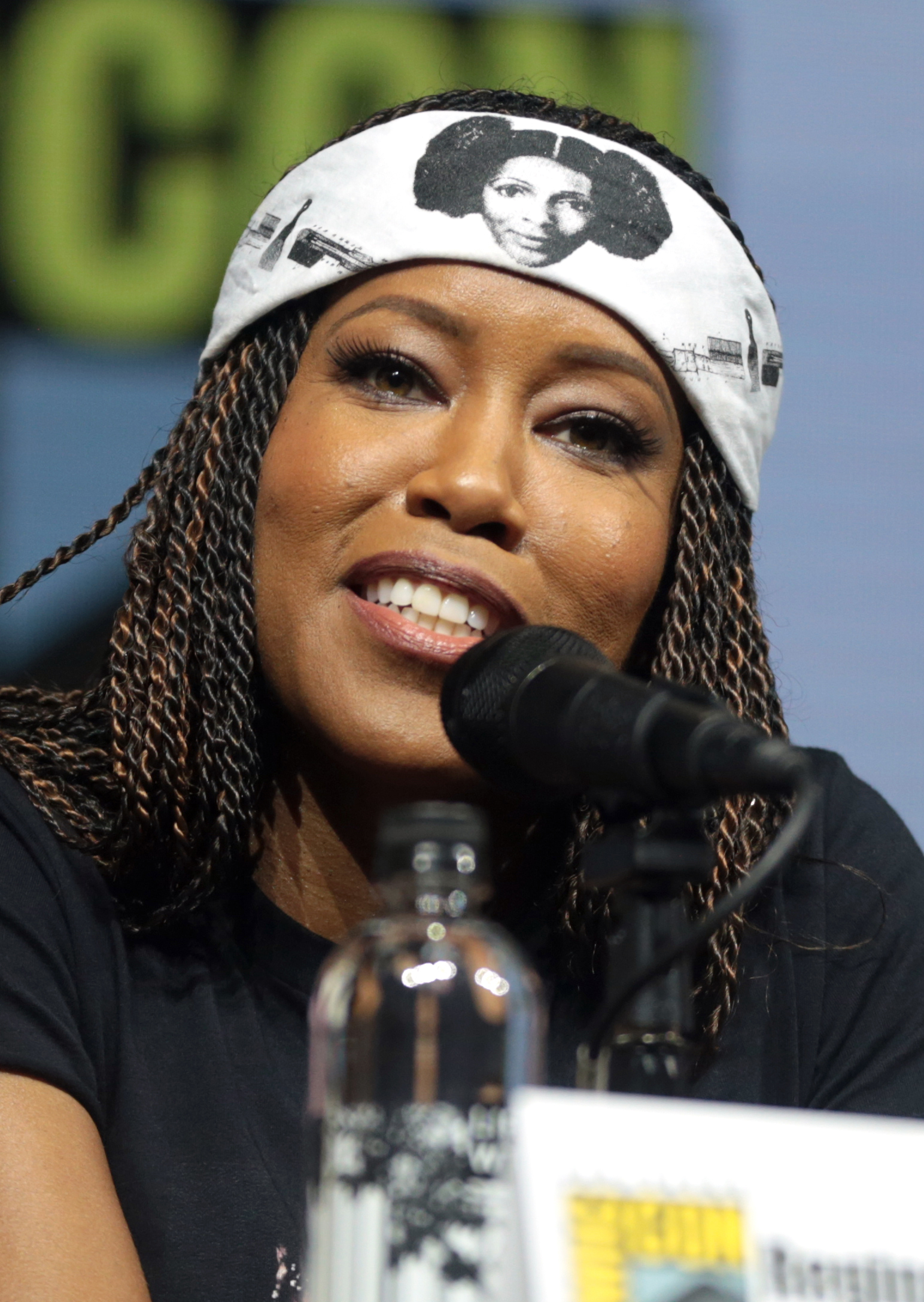
Regina King, Best Actress in a Supporting Role winner

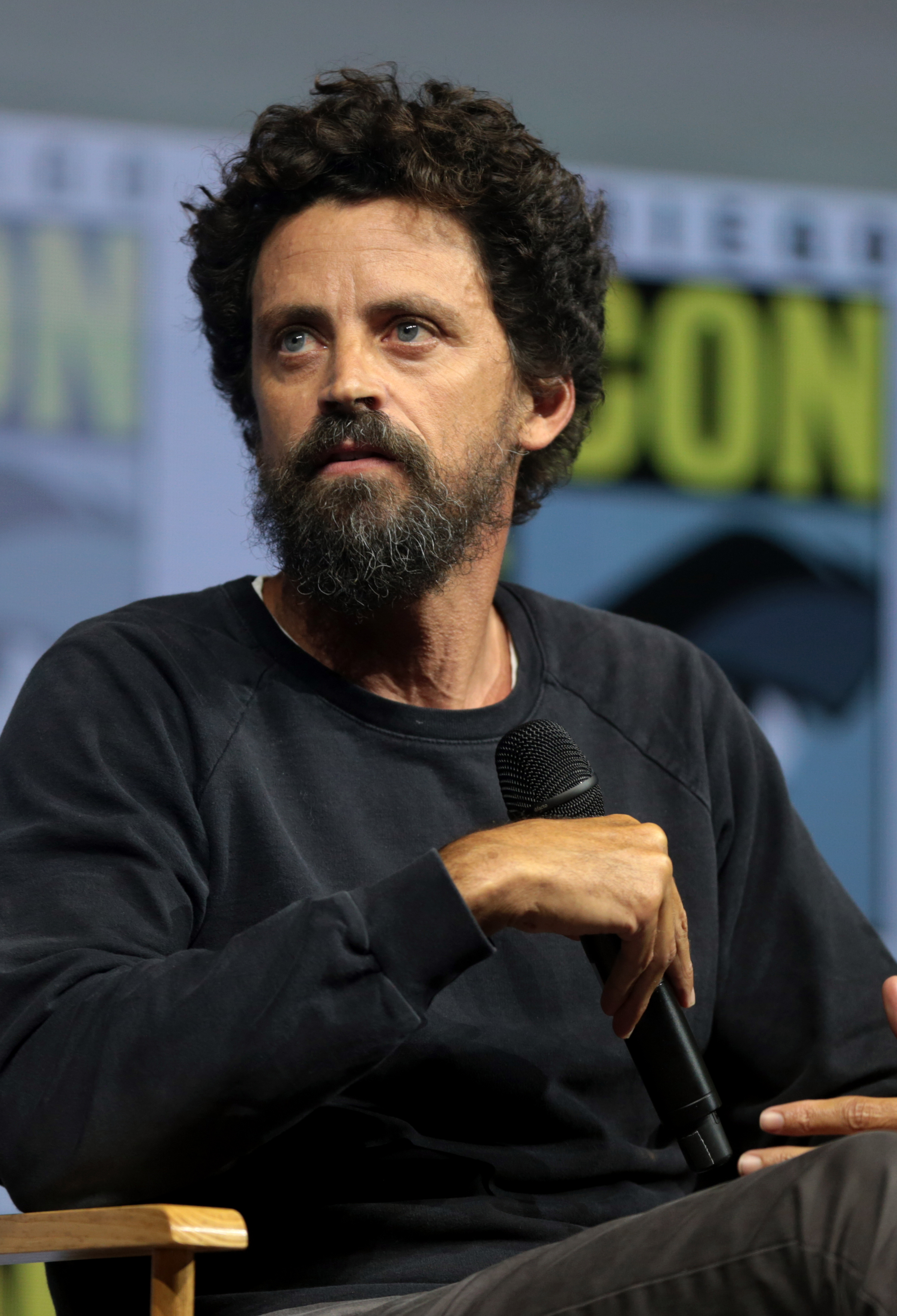
Bob Persichetti, Best Animated Feature co-winner

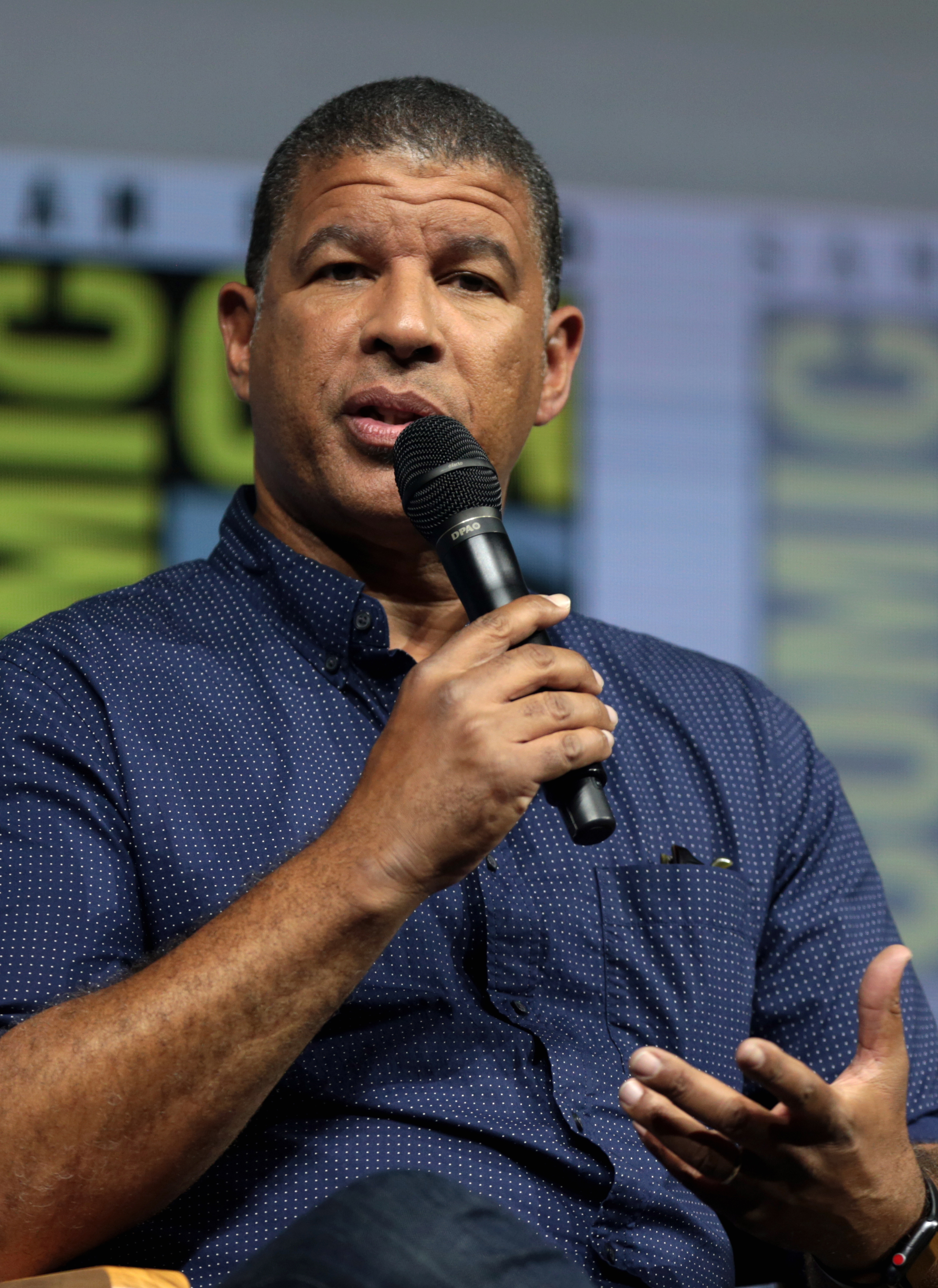
Peter Ramsey, Best Animated Feature co-winner

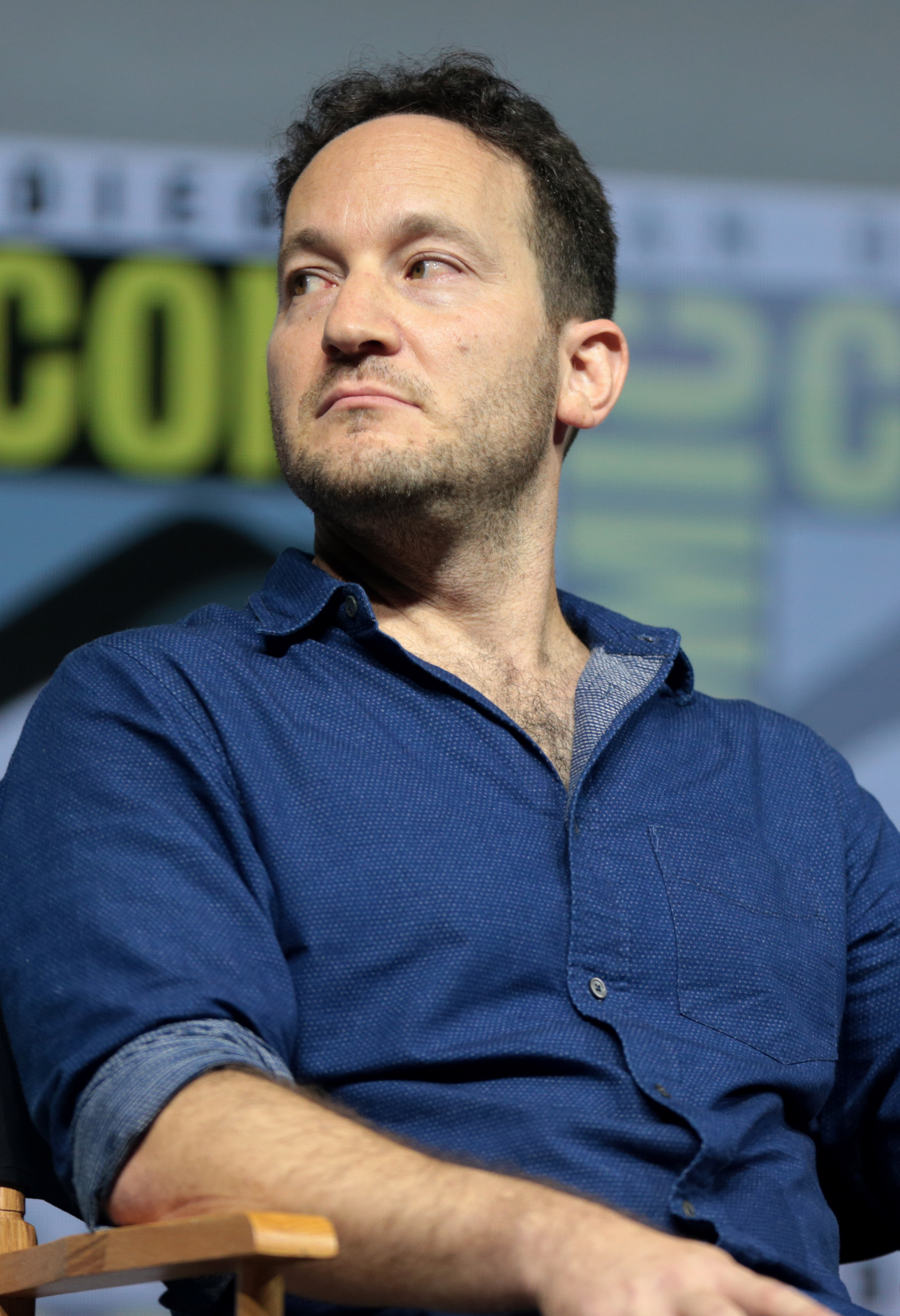
Rodney Rothman, Best Animated Feature co-winner

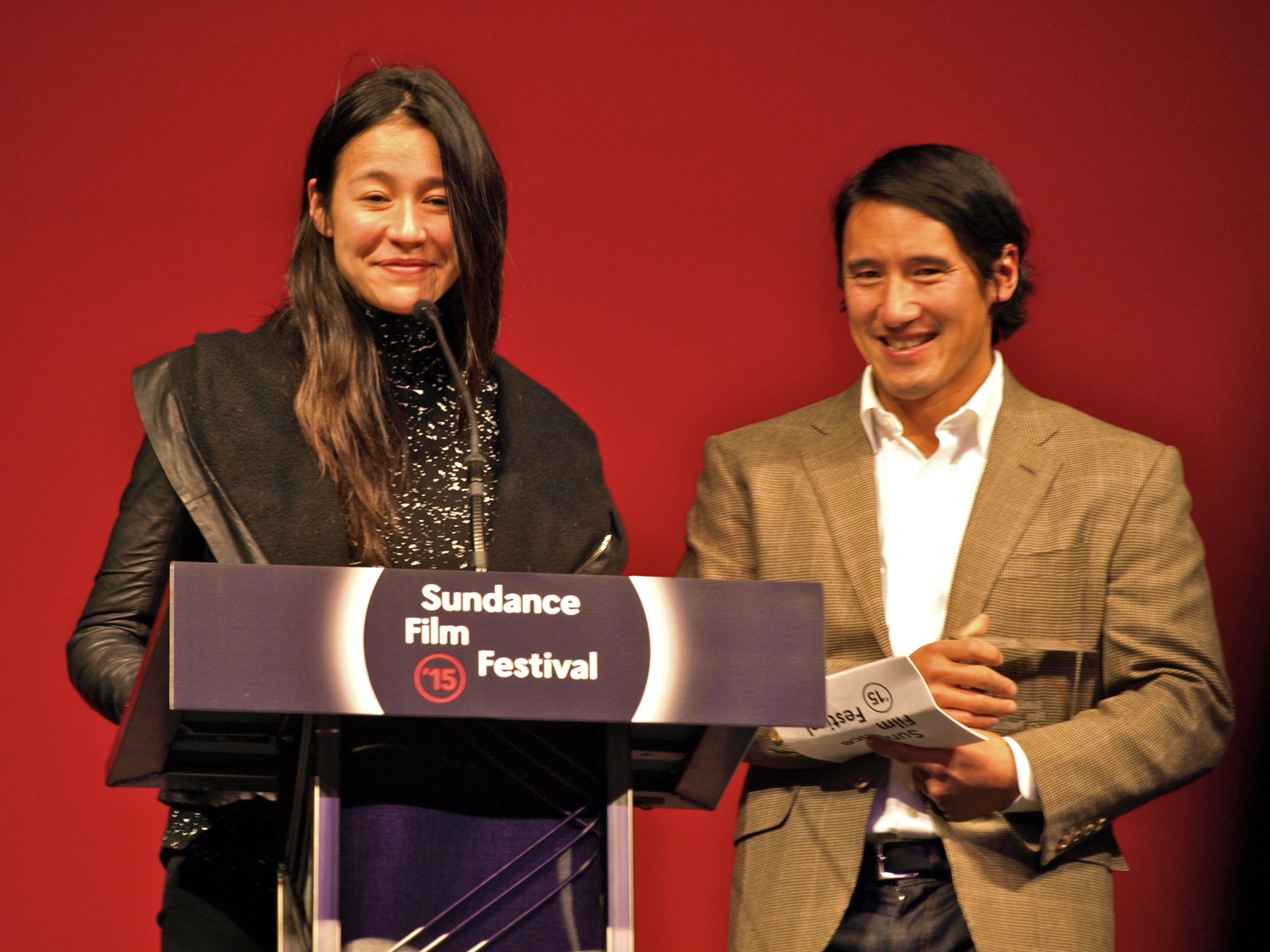
Elizabeth Chai Vasarhelyi and Jimmy Chin, Best Documentary Feature winners

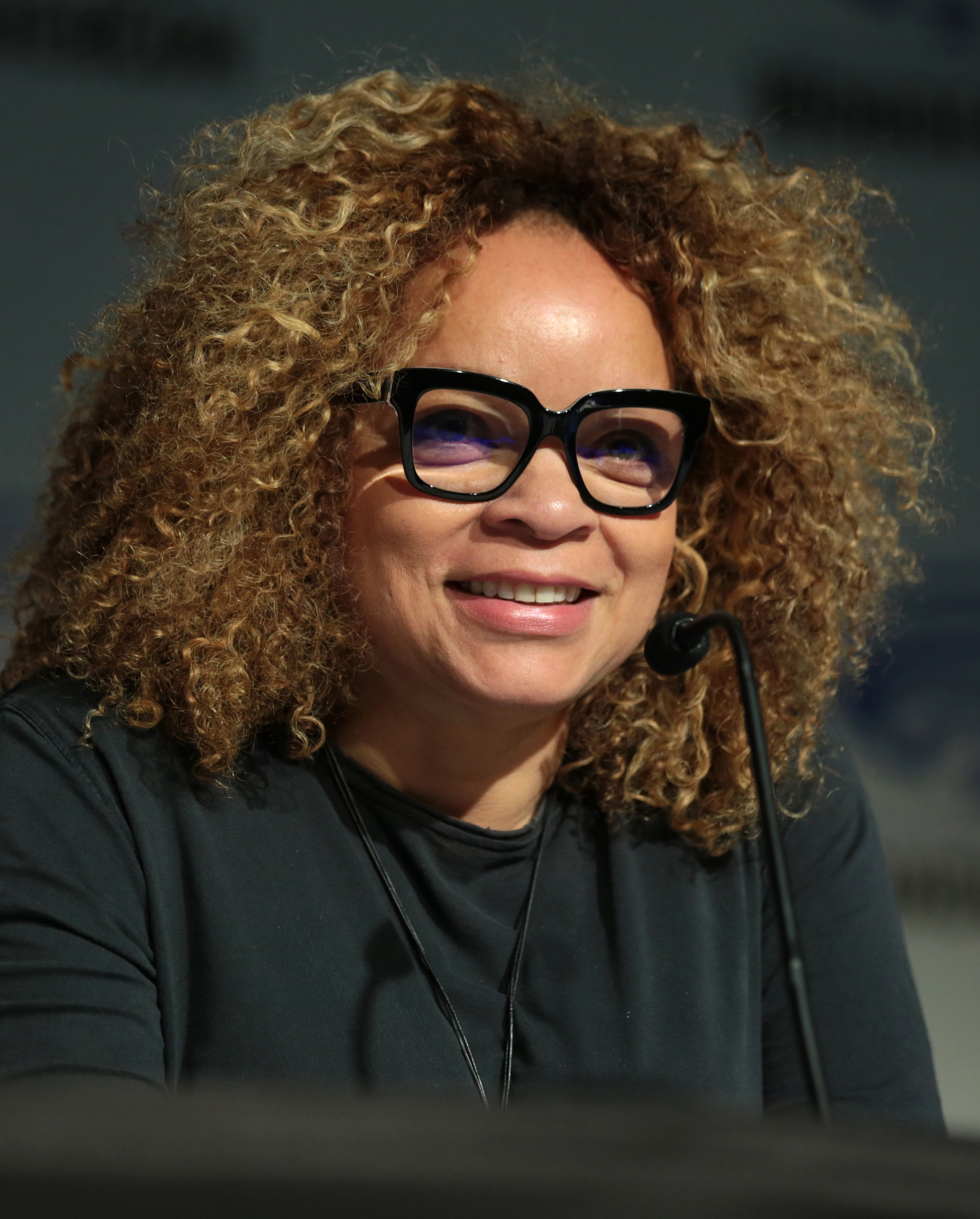
Ruth E. Carter, Best Costume Design winner

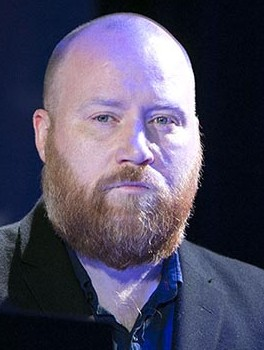
Jóhann Jóhannsson, Best Original Score winner

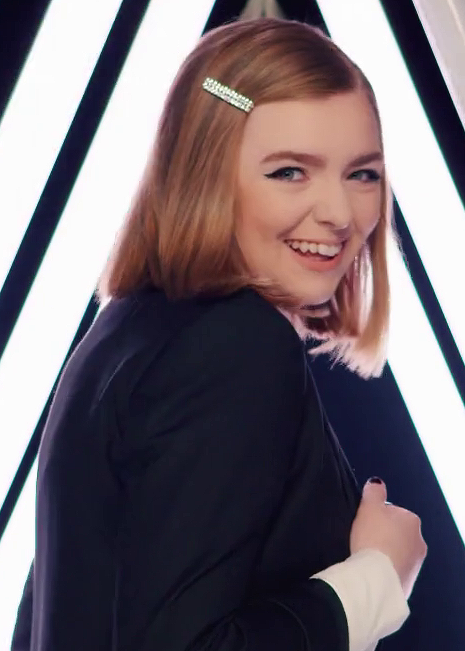
Elsie Fisher, Best Youth Performance winner

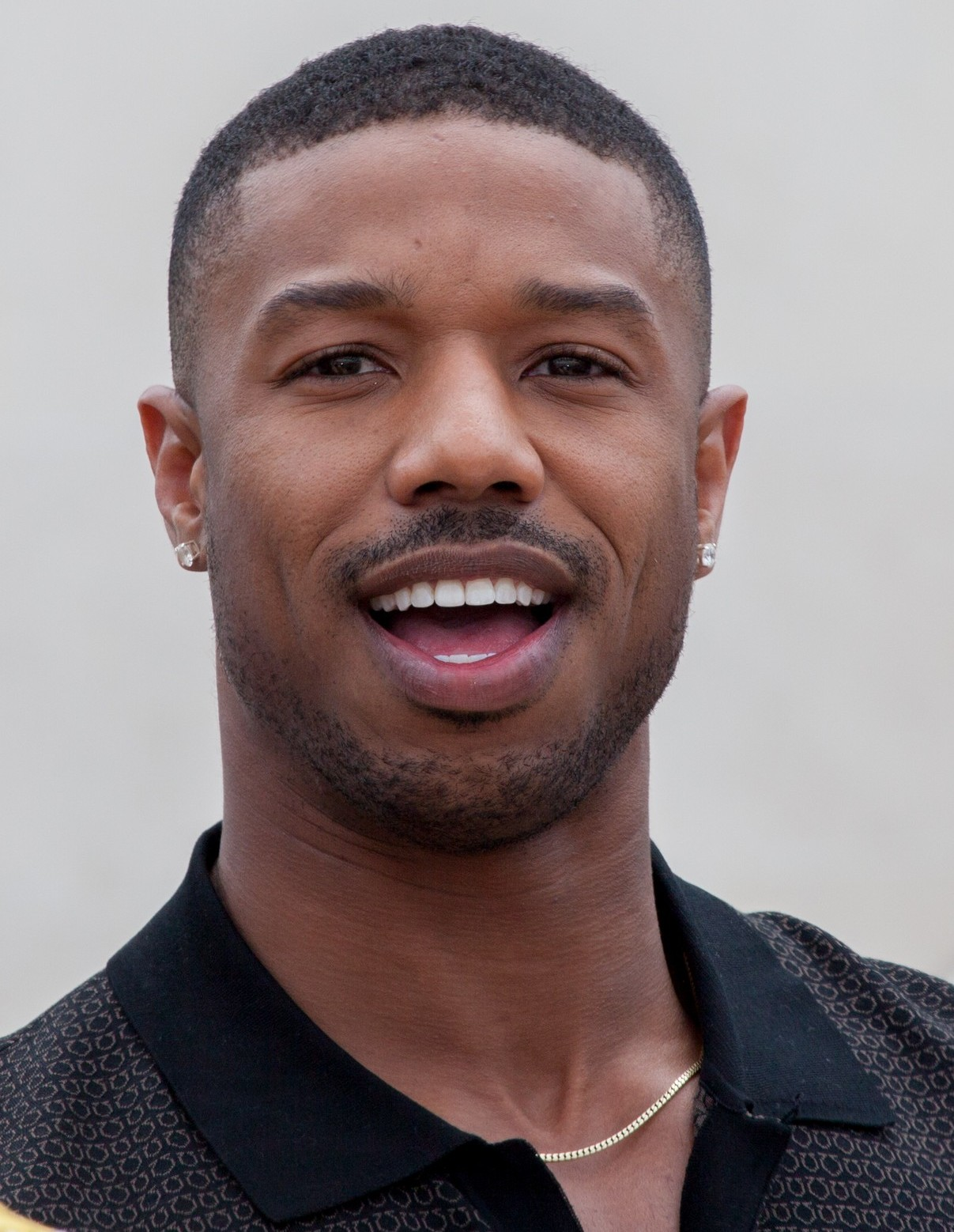
Michael B. Jordan, Villain of the Year winner

Best Picture of the Year Roma: Black Panther; Blindspotting; The Favourite; First Reformed; If Beale Street Could Talk; Mission: Impossible – Fallout; Paddington 2; A Star Is Born; Suspiria	Best Director Alfonso Cuarón – Roma: Bradley Cooper – A Star Is Born; Barry Jenkins – If Beale Street Could Talk; Yorgos Lanthimos – The Favourite; Paul Schrader – First Reformed
Best Actor in a Leading Role Ethan Hawke – First Reformed as Reverend Ernst Toller: Bradley Cooper – A Star Is Born as Jackson Maine; Daveed Diggs – Blindspotting as Collin Hoskins; Rami Malek – Bohemian Rhapsody as Freddie Mercury; Joaquin Phoenix – You Were Never Really Here as Joe	Best Actress in a Leading Role Toni Collette – Hereditary as Annie Graham: Yalitza Aparicio – Roma as Cleodegaria "Cleo" Gutiérrez; Olivia Colman – The Favourite as Queen Anne; Lady Gaga – A Star Is Born as Ally Maine; Regina Hall – Support the Girls as Lisa Conroy
Best Actor in a Supporting Role Richard E. Grant – Can You Ever Forgive Me? as Jack Hock: Mahershala Ali – Green Book as Don Shirley; Russell Hornsby – The Hate U Give as Maverick Carter; Michael B. Jordan – Black Panther as Erik Killmonger; Steven Yeun – Burning as Ben	Best Actress in a Supporting Role Regina King – If Beale Street Could Talk as Sharon Rivers: Elizabeth Debicki – Widows as Alice Gunner; Claire Foy – First Man as Janet Armstrong; Emma Stone – The Favourite as Abigail Masham; Rachel Weisz – The Favourite as Sarah Churchill
Best Ensemble Cast Widows: Black Panther; The Favourite; If Beale Street Could Talk; Vice	Best Screenplay The Favourite – Deborah Davis and Tony McNamara: Blindspotting – Rafael Casal and Daveed Diggs; First Reformed – Paul Schrader; If Beale Street Could Talk – Barry Jenkins; Roma – Alfonso Cuarón
Best Animated Feature Spider-Man: Into the Spider-Verse – Bob Persichetti, Peter Ramsey, and Rodney Rothman: Incredibles 2 – Brad Bird; Isle of Dogs – Wes Anderson; Mirai – Mamoru Hosoda; Ralph Breaks the Internet – Rich Moore and Phil Johnston	Best Documentary Feature Free Solo – Elizabeth Chai Vasarhelyi and Jimmy Chin: Minding the Gap – Bing Liu; Shirkers – Sandi Tan; Three Identical Strangers – Tim Wardle; Won't You Be My Neighbor? – Morgan Neville
Best Foreign Language Film Roma – Alfonso Cuarón: Burning – Lee Chang-dong; Cold War – Paweł Pawlikowski; Revenge – Coralie Fargeat; Shoplifters – Hirokazu Kore-eda	Best Cinematography Roma – Alfonso Cuarón: The Favourite – Robbie Ryan; If Beale Street Could Talk – James Laxton; Mission: Impossible – Fallout – Rob Hardy; The Rider – Joshua James Richards
Best Costume Design Black Panther – Ruth E. Carter: Colette – Andrea Flesch; The Favourite – Sandy Powell; Mary Poppins Returns – Sandy Powell; Suspiria – Giulia Piersanti	Best Film Editing Mission: Impossible – Fallout – Eddie Hamilton: BlacKkKlansman – Barry Alexander Brown; The Favourite – Yorgos Mavropsaridis; First Man – Tom Cross; Roma – Alfonso Cuarón and Adam Gough
Best Original Score Mandy – Jóhann Jóhannsson: First Man – Justin Hurwitz; If Beale Street Could Talk – Nicholas Britell; Mission: Impossible – Fallout – Lorne Balfe; You Were Never Really Here – Jonny Greenwood	Best Production Design The Favourite – Fiona Crombie (Production Design); Alice Felton (Set Decoration): Black Panther – Hannah Beachler (Production Design); Jay Hart (Set Decoration); First Man – Nathan Crowley (Production Design); Kathy Lucas (Set Decoration); Mary Poppins Returns – John Myhre (Production Design); Gordon Sim (Set Decoration); Roma – Eugenio Caballero (Production Design); Bárbara Enríquez (Set Decoration)
Best Visual Effects Mission: Impossible – Fallout – Jody Johnson: Annihilation – Andrew Whitehurst, Sara Bennett, Richard Clarke, and Simon Hughes; Avengers: Infinity War – Dan DeLeeuw, Kelly Port, Russell Earl, and Dan Sudick; Black Panther – Geoffrey Baumann, Jesse James Chisholm, Craig Hammack, and Dan Sudick; First Man – Paul Lambert, J. D. Schwalm, Ian Hunter, and Tristan Myles	Best Youth Performance Elsie Fisher – Eighth Grade as Kayla Day: Kairi Jō – Shoplifters as Shota Shibata; Thomasin McKenzie – Leave No Trace as Tom; Milly Shapiro – Hereditary as Charlie Graham; Millicent Simmonds – A Quiet Place as Regan Abbott
Villain of the Year Erik Killmonger – Black Panther (portrayed by Michael B. Jordan): Phoenix Buchanan – Paddington 2 (portrayed by Hugh Grant); Jatemme Manning – Widows (portrayed by Daniel Kaluuya); STEM – Upgrade (voiced by Simon Maiden); Thanos – Avengers: Infinity War (portrayed by Josh Brolin)

Films that received multiple nominations
Nominations	Film
11	The Favourite
8	Roma
7	Black Panther
7	If Beale Street Could Talk
5	First Man
5	Mission: Impossible – Fallout
4	First Reformed
4	A Star Is Born
3	Blindspotting
3	Widows
2	Avengers: Infinity War
2	Burning
2	Hereditary
2	Mary Poppins Returns
2	Paddington 2
2	Shoplifters
2	Suspiria
2	You Were Never Really Here

Films that received multiple awards
Awards	Film
4	Roma
2	Black Panther
2	The Favourite
2	Mission: Impossible – Fallout
