= Black Reel Award for Outstanding Production Design =

Award presented annually by the Black Reel Awards

- Awarded for: Outstanding Cinematography
- Country: United States
- Presented by: Black Reel Awards (BRAs)
- First award: Black Reel Awards of 2019
- Most recent winner: Gavin Bocquet; Jingle Jangle: A Christmas Journey (Black Reel Awards of 2021)
- Website: blackreelawards.com

This article lists the winners and nominees for the Black Reel Award for Outstanding Production Design. The award is given to the production designer of the nominated film. The category was first introduced at the 19th Annual Black Reel Awards where Hannah Beachler took home the first award in this category for Black Panther.

== Winners and nominees ==
=== 2010s ===
Year	Production Designer	Film	Ref.
2019	Hannah Beachler	Black Panther	
2019	Marci Mudd	BlacKkKlansman	
2019	Naomi Shohan	A Wrinkle in Time	
2019	Tim Galvin	Green Book	
2019	Mark Friedberg	If Beale Street Could Talk	

=== 2020s ===
Year	Writer	Film	Ref.
2020	Clay A. Griffith	Dolemite Is My Name	
2020	Warren Alan Young	Harriet	
2020	Karen Murphy	Queen & Slim	
2020	Ruth de Jong	Us	
2020	James Chinlund	The Lion King	
2021	Gavin Bocquet	Jingle Jangle: A Christmas Journey	
2021	Mark Ricker	Ma Rainey's Black Bottom	
2021	Barry Robison	One Night in Miami...	
2021	Sam Lisenco	Judas and the Black Messiah	
2021	Nathan Crowley	Tenet	
2022	Martin Whist	The Harder They Fall	
2022	Nelson Coates	In the Heights	
2022	Nora Mendis	Passing	
2022	Stefan Dechant	The Tragedy of Macbeth	
2022	Adam Stockhuasen	West Side Story	
