= Washington D.C. Area Film Critics Association Awards 2018 =

Annual US film awards ceremony

17th WAFCA Awards
- Date: December 3, 2018

Highlights
- Best Film: Roma
- Best Director: Alfonso Cuarón for Roma
- Best Actor: Bradley Cooper
- Best Actress: Lady Gaga

The 17th Washington D.C. Area Film Critics Association Awards were announced on December 3, 2018.

== Winners and nominees ==
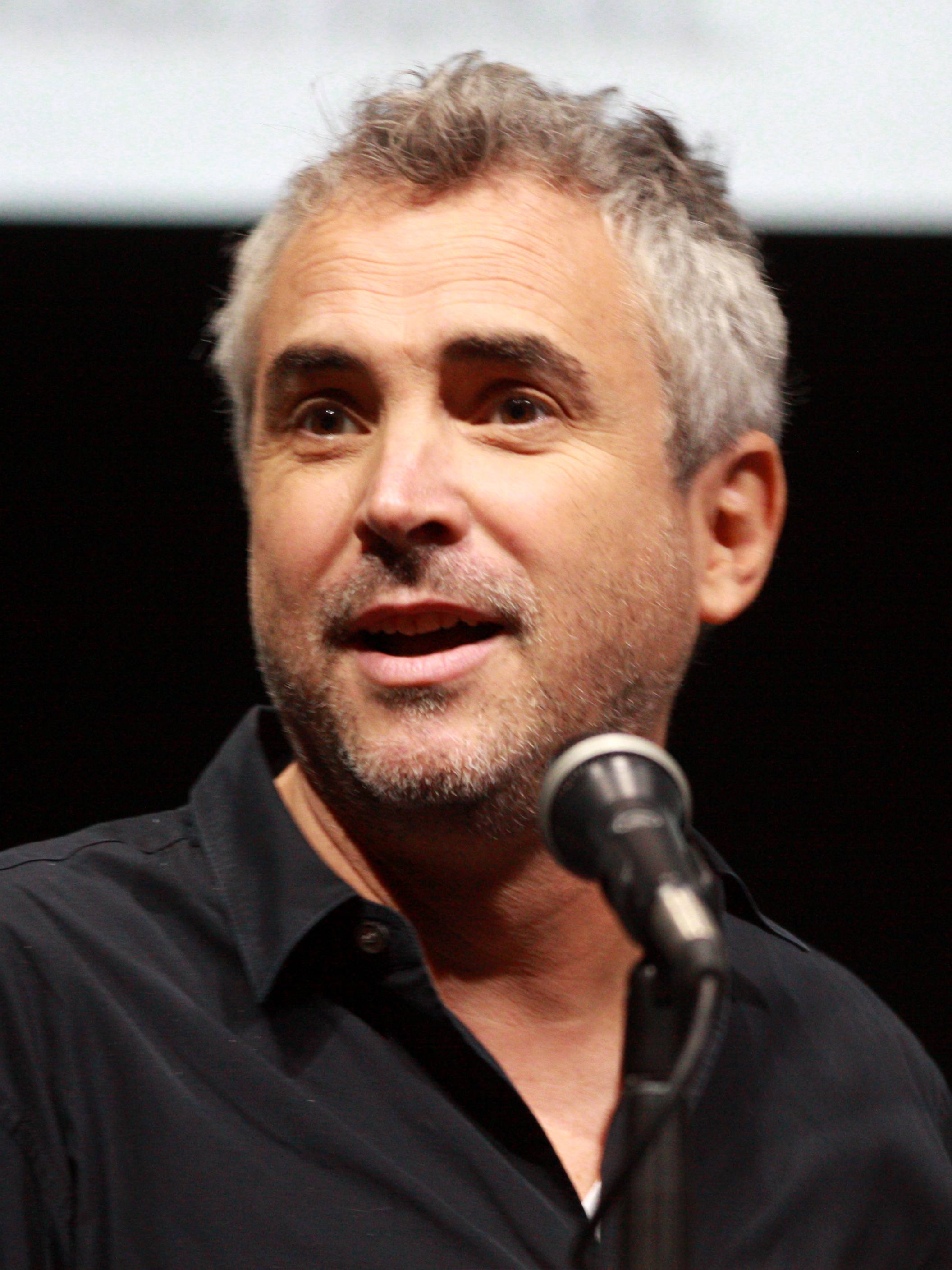
Alfonso Cuarón, Best Director winner

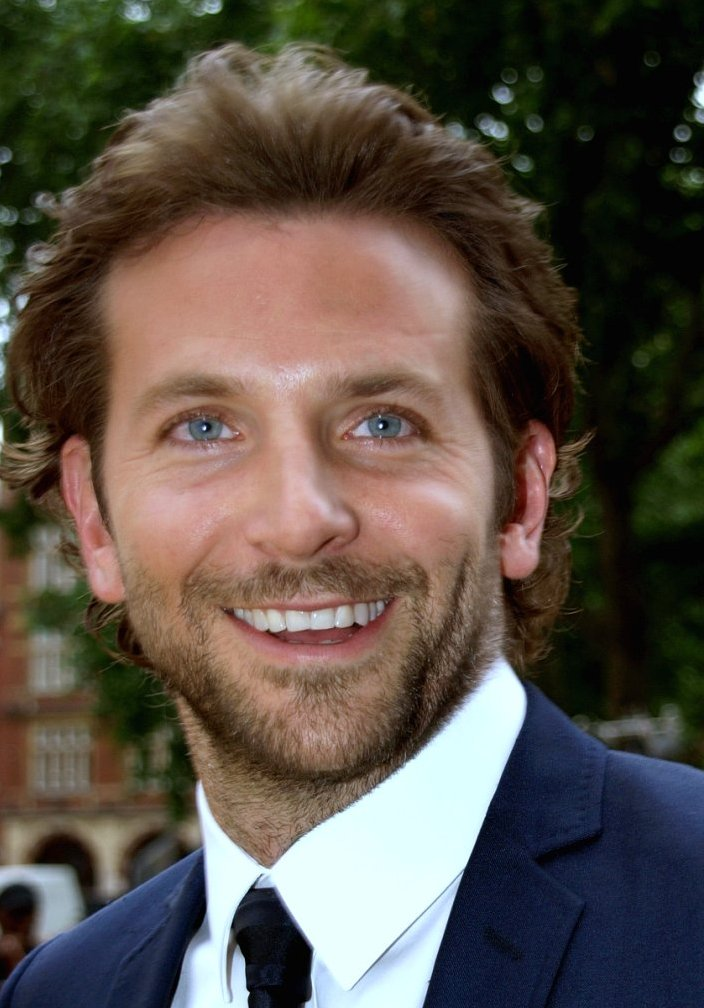
Bradley Cooper, Best Actor winner

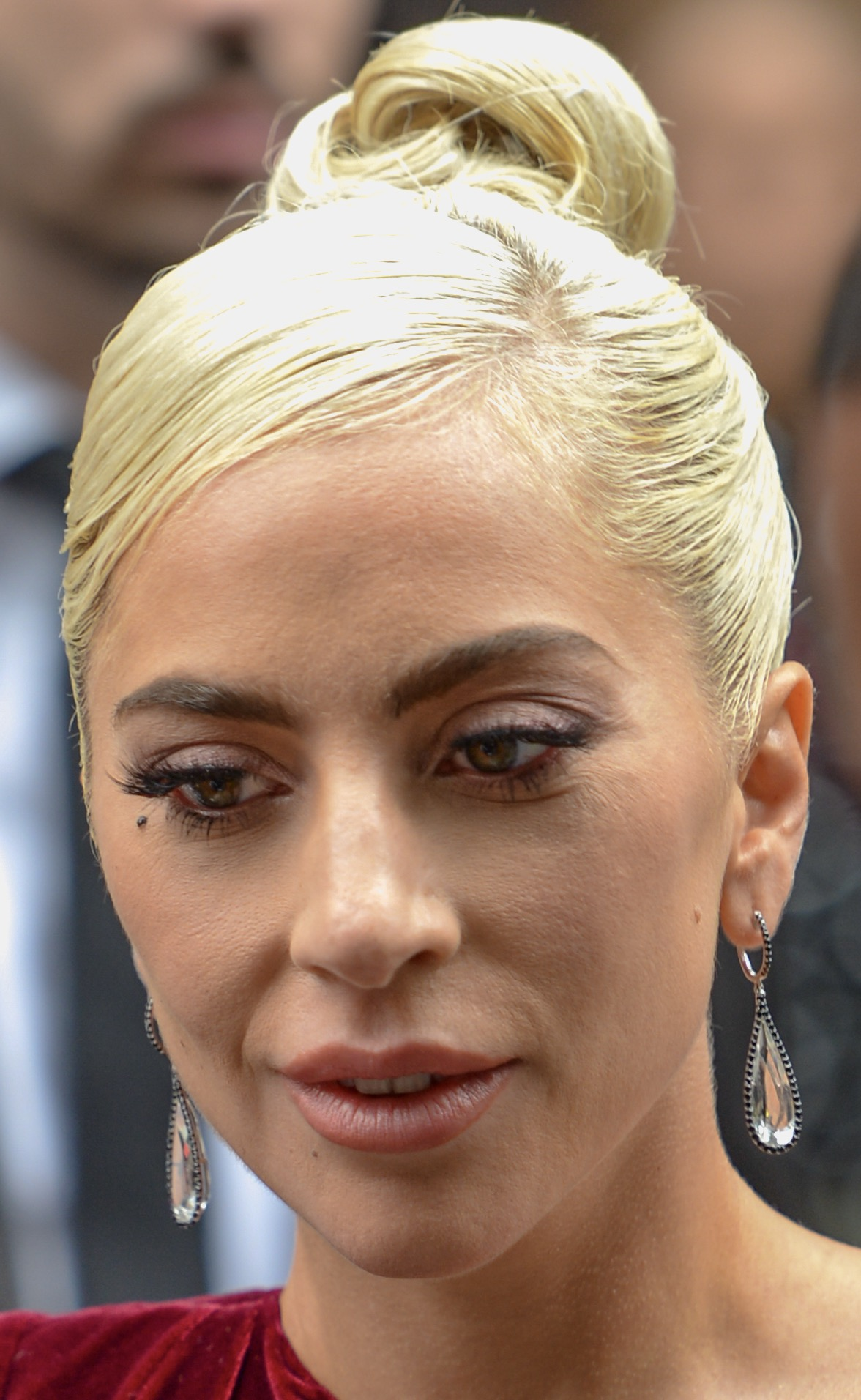
Lady Gaga, Best Actress winner

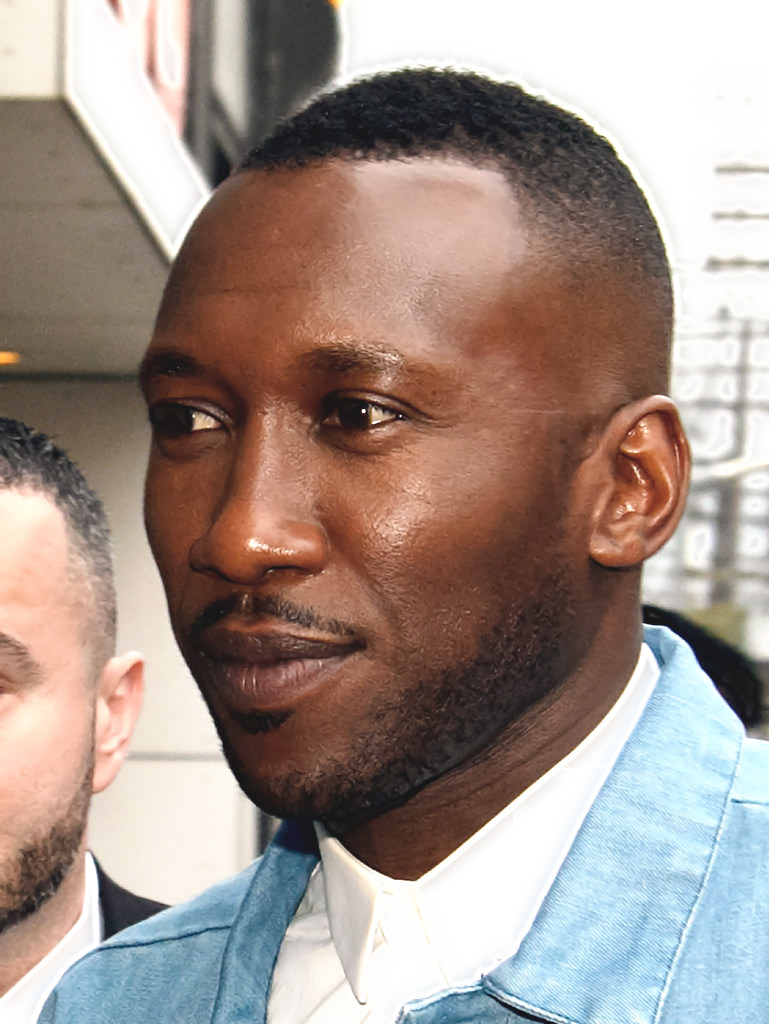
Mahershala Ali, Best Supporting Actor winner

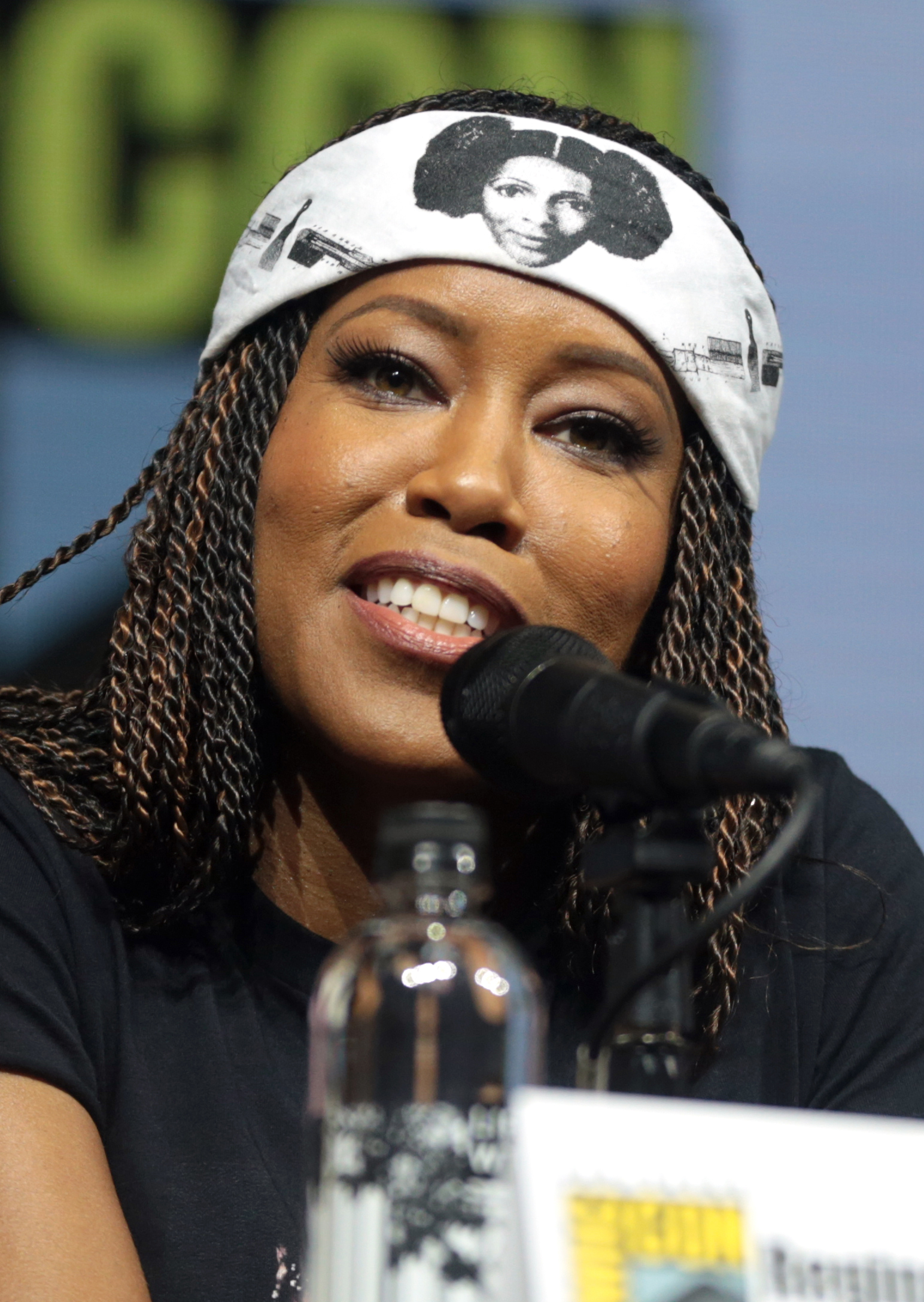
Regina King, Best Supporting Actress winner

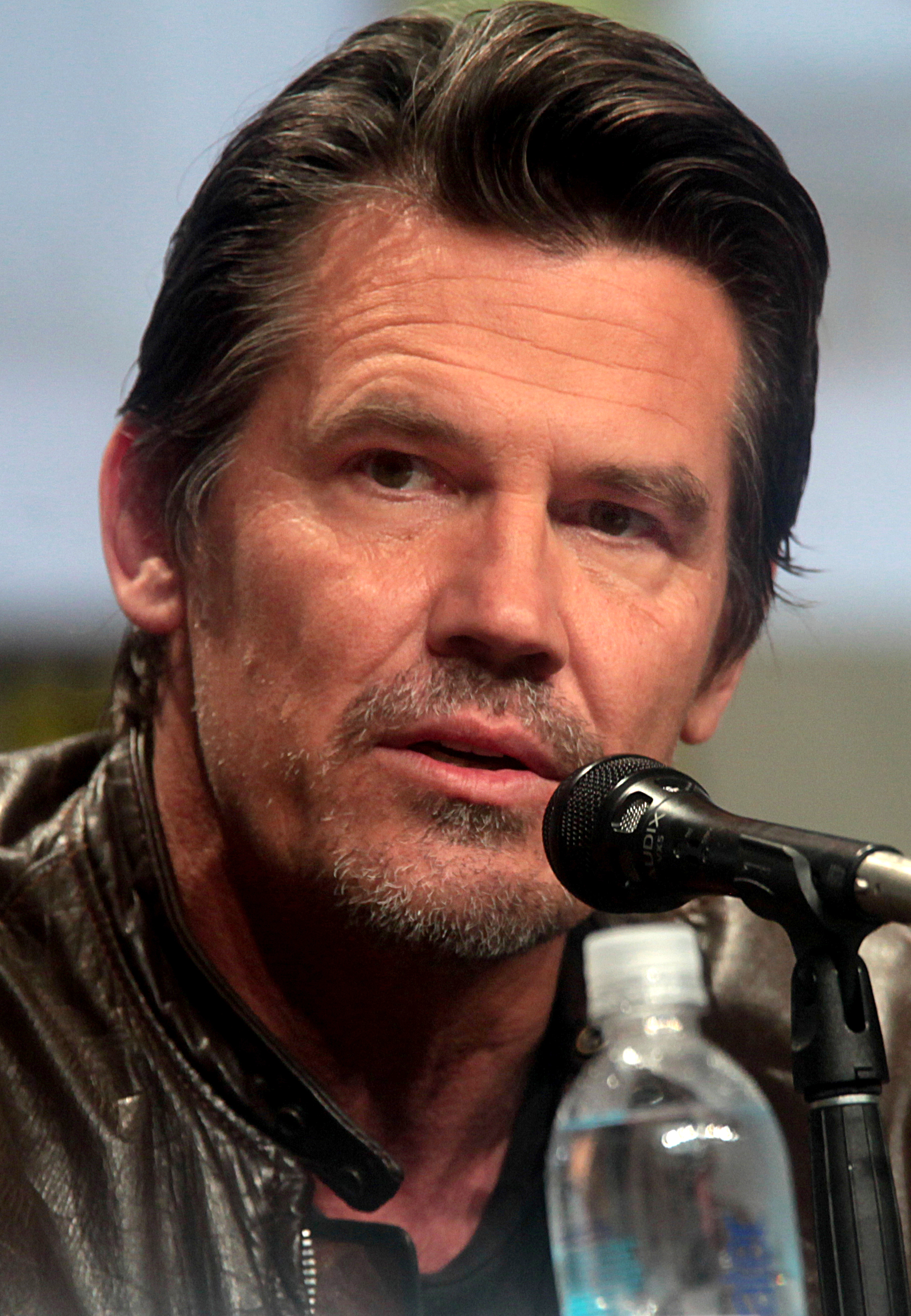
Josh Brolin, Best Motion Capture Performance winner

Best Film

- Roma

- The Favourite
- Green Book
- If Beale Street Could Talk
- A Star Is Born

Best Director

- Alfonso Cuarón – Roma

- Ryan Coogler – Black Panther
- Bradley Cooper – A Star Is Born
- Barry Jenkins – If Beale Street Could Talk
- Yorgos Lanthimos – The Favourite

Best Actor

- Bradley Cooper – A Star Is Born

- Christian Bale – Vice
- Ethan Hawke – First Reformed
- Rami Malek – Bohemian Rhapsody
- Viggo Mortensen – Green Book

Best Actress

- Lady Gaga – A Star Is Born

- Glenn Close – The Wife
- Toni Collette – Hereditary
- Olivia Colman – The Favourite
- Melissa McCarthy – Can You Ever Forgive Me?

Best Supporting Actor

- Mahershala Ali – Green Book

- Timothée Chalamet – Beautiful Boy
- Sam Elliott – A Star Is Born
- Richard E. Grant – Can You Ever Forgive Me?
- Michael B. Jordan – Black Panther

Best Supporting Actress

- Regina King – If Beale Street Could Talk

- Cynthia Erivo – Bad Times at the El Royale
- Nicole Kidman – Boy Erased
- Emma Stone – The Favourite
- Rachel Weisz – The Favourite

Best Adapted Screenplay

- Nicole Holofcener and Jeff Whitty – Can You Ever Forgive Me?

- Ryan Coogler and Joe Robert Cole – Black Panther
- Bradley Cooper, Will Fetters, and Eric Roth – A Star Is Born
- Barry Jenkins – If Beale Street Could Talk
- Spike Lee, David Rabinowitz, Charlie Wachtel, and Kevin Willmott – BlacKkKlansman

Best Original Screenplay

- Deborah Davis and Tony McNamara – The Favourite

- Bo Burnham – Eighth Grade
- Alfonso Cuarón – Roma
- Paul Schrader – First Reformed
- Nick Vallelonga, Peter Farrelly, and Brian Hayes Currie – Green Book

Best Ensemble

- The Favourite

- Black Panther
- If Beale Street Could Talk
- Vice
- Widows

Best Animated Feature

- Isle of Dogs

- Incredibles 2
- Mirai
- Ralph Breaks the Internet
- Spider-Man: Into the Spider-Verse
- The Grinch
- Early Man

Best Documentary Film

- Won't You Be My Neighbor?

- Free Solo
- RBG
- Science Fair
- Three Identical Strangers

Best Foreign Language Film

- Roma • Mexico

- Burning • South Korea
- Capernaum • Lebanon
- Cold War • Poland
- Shoplifters • Japan

Best Cinematography

- Alfonso Cuarón – Roma

- James Laxton – If Beale Street Could Talk
- Matthew Libatique – A Star Is Born
- Robbie Ryan – The Favourite
- Linus Sandgren – First Man

Best Editing

- Tom Cross – First Man

- Jay Cassidy – A Star Is Born
- Alfonso Cuarón and Adam Gough – Roma
- Yorgos Mavropsaridis – The Favourite
- Joe Walker – Widows

Best Original Score

- Nicholas Britell – If Beale Street Could Talk

- Ludwig Göransson – Black Panther
- Justin Hurwitz – First Man
- Thom Yorke – Suspiria
- Hans Zimmer – Widows

Best Production Design

- Hannah Beachler (production design) and Jay Hart (set decoration) – Black Panther

- Eugenio Caballero (production design) and Bárbara Enríquez (set decoration) – Roma
- Fiona Crombie (production design) and Alice Felton (set decoration) – The Favourite
- Nathan Crowley (production design) and Kathy Lucas (set decoration) – First Man
- John Myhre (production design) and Gordon Sim (set decoration) – Mary Poppins Returns

Best Youth Performance

- Elsie Fisher – Eighth Grade

- Thomasin Harcourt McKenzie – Leave No Trace
- Milly Shapiro – Hereditary
- Millicent Simmonds – A Quiet Place
- Amandla Stenberg – The Hate U Give

Best Animated Voice Performance

- Bryan Cranston – Isle of Dogs

- Holly Hunter – Incredibles 2
- Shameik Moore – Spider-Man: Into the Spider-Verse
- Sarah Silverman – Ralph Breaks the Internet
- Ben Whishaw – Paddington 2

Best Motion Capture Performance

- Josh Brolin – Avengers: Infinity War

- Tye Sheridan – Ready Player One
- Phoebe Waller-Bridge – Solo: A Star Wars Story

The Joe Barber Award for Best Portrayal of Washington, D.C.

- Vice

- The Front Runner
- RBG

== Multiple nominations and awards ==
These films had multiple nominations:

- 10 nominations: The Favourite
- 8 nominations: A Star Is Born
- 7 nominations: If Beale Street Could Talk and Roma
- 6 nominations: Black Panther
- 4 nominations: First Man and Green Book
- 3 nominations: Can You Ever Forgive Me?, Vice, and Widows
- 2 nominations: Eighth Grade, First Reformed, Hereditary, Incredibles 2, Isle of Dogs, Ralph Breaks the Internet, RBG, and Spider-Man: Into the Spider-Verse

The following films received multiple awards:

- 4 wins: Roma
- 2 wins: The Favourite, If Beale Street Could Talk, Isle of Dogs, and A Star Is Born
