= 22nd Hollywood Film Awards =

US film awards ceremony in 2018

- Date: November 4, 2018
- Site: The Beverly Hilton; Beverly Hills, California, U.S.
- Hosted by: Awkwafina
- Official website: www.hollywoodawards.com

The 22nd Hollywood Film Awards were held on November 4, 2018. The ceremony took place at The Beverly Hilton Hotel in Beverly Hills, California, and was hosted by Awkwafina.

== Winners ==
Hollywood Career Achievement Award
Nicole Kidman
Hollywood Actor Award
Hugh Jackman – The Front Runner
Hollywood Supporting Actor Award
Timothée Chalamet – Beautiful Boy
Hollywood Actress Award
Glenn Close – The Wife
Hollywood Supporting Actress Award
Rachel Weisz – The Favourite
Hollywood Breakout Actor Award
John David Washington – BlacKkKlansman
Hollywood Breakout Actress Award
Amandla Stenberg – The Hate U Give
Hollywood Breakthrough Director Award
Felix van Groeningen – Beautiful Boy
New Hollywood Award
Yalitza Aparicio – Roma
Hollywood Ensemble Award
Viggo Mortensen, Mahershala Ali, and Linda Cardellini – Green Book
Hollywood Breakout Ensemble Award
Constance Wu, Henry Golding, Michelle Yeoh, Gemma Chan, Lisa Lu, Awkwafina, Ken Jeong, Sonoya Mizuno, Chris Pang, Jimmy O. Yang, Ronny Chieng, Remy Hii, and Nico Santos – Crazy Rich Asians
Hollywood Film Award
Black Panther
Hollywood Animation Award
Incredibles 2
Hollywood Documentary Award
Believer
Hollywood Director Award
Damien Chazelle – First Man
Hollywood Screenwriter Award
Peter Farrelly, Nick Vallelonga, and Brian Currie – Green Book
Hollywood Cinematography Award
Matthew Libatique – A Star Is Born
Hollywood Film Composer Award
Justin Hurwitz – First Man
Hollywood Editor Award
Tom Cross – First Man
Hollywood Visual Effects Award
Dan DeLeeuw, Kelly Port, Russell Earl, and Dan Sudick – Avengers: Infinity War
Hollywood Costume Design Award
Sandy Powell – The Favourite
Hollywood Make-Up & Hair Styling Award
Jenny Shircore, Sarah Kelly, and Hannah Edwards – Mary Queen of Scots
Hollywood Production Design Award
Hannah Beachler – Black Panther
Hollywood Sound Award
Erik Aadahl, Ethan Van der Ryn, and Brandon Proctor – A Quiet Place
