= Jay Hart (set decorator) =

American set decorator

Jay Robert Hart is an American set decorator who has worked in Hollywood since the early 1990s. Hart and production designer Hannah Beachler won the Academy Award for Best Production Design for Black Panther (2018). Prior to that, Hart and art director Jeannine Oppewall were nominated for the Academy Award for Best Art Direction (the original name for Academy Award for Best Production Design) for L.A. Confidential (1997) and Pleasantville (1998).

== Filmography ==
- Wayne's World (1992)
- Gladiator (1992)
- Forever Young (1993)
- Coneheads (1993)
- Striking Distance (1993)
- Wayne's World 2 (1993)
- Clear and Present Danger (1994)
- Losing Isaiah (1995)
- The Bridges of Madison County (1995)
- Virtuosity (1995)
- The Late Shift (1996)
- Phenomenon (1996)
- L.A. Confidential (1997)
- Pleasantville (1998)
- The Other Sister (1999)
- Fight Club (1999)
- Wonder Boys (2000)
- Swordfish (2001)
- Punch-Drunk Love (2002)
- Waking Up in Reno (2002)
- Terminator 3: Rise of the Machines (2003)
- Spider-Man 2 (2004)
- Rumor Has It... (2005)
- Blades of Glory (2007)
- 3:10 to Yuma (2007)
- Mr. Woodcock (2007)
- The Happening (2008)
- Edge of Darkness (2010)
- Date Night (2010)
- Knight and Day (2010)
- Machine Gun Preacher (2011)
- Terminator Genisys (2015)
- Independence Day: Resurgence (2016)
- Guardians of the Galaxy Vol. 2 (2017)
- Black Panther (2018)
- Triple Frontier (2019)
- Those Who Wish Me Dead (2021)
