= Craig Hammack =

American special effects supervisor

Craig Hammack is an American special effects supervisor known for his works in Disney's visual effects company Industrial Light & Magic (ILM). Hammack has worked as a technical director, digital effects artist and VFX supervisor in films, Titanic (1997), Pearl Harbor (2001), Star Wars: Episode III – Revenge of the Sith (2005), Indiana Jones and the Kingdom of the Crystal Skull (2008), Star Trek (2009), Red Tails (2012), Tomorrowland (2015), Deepwater Horizon (2016), and Black Panther (2018).

For Deepwater Horizon, he received critical acclaim and an Academy Award for Best Visual Effects nomination at 89th Academy Awards.
