= Hannah Beachler =

American production designer

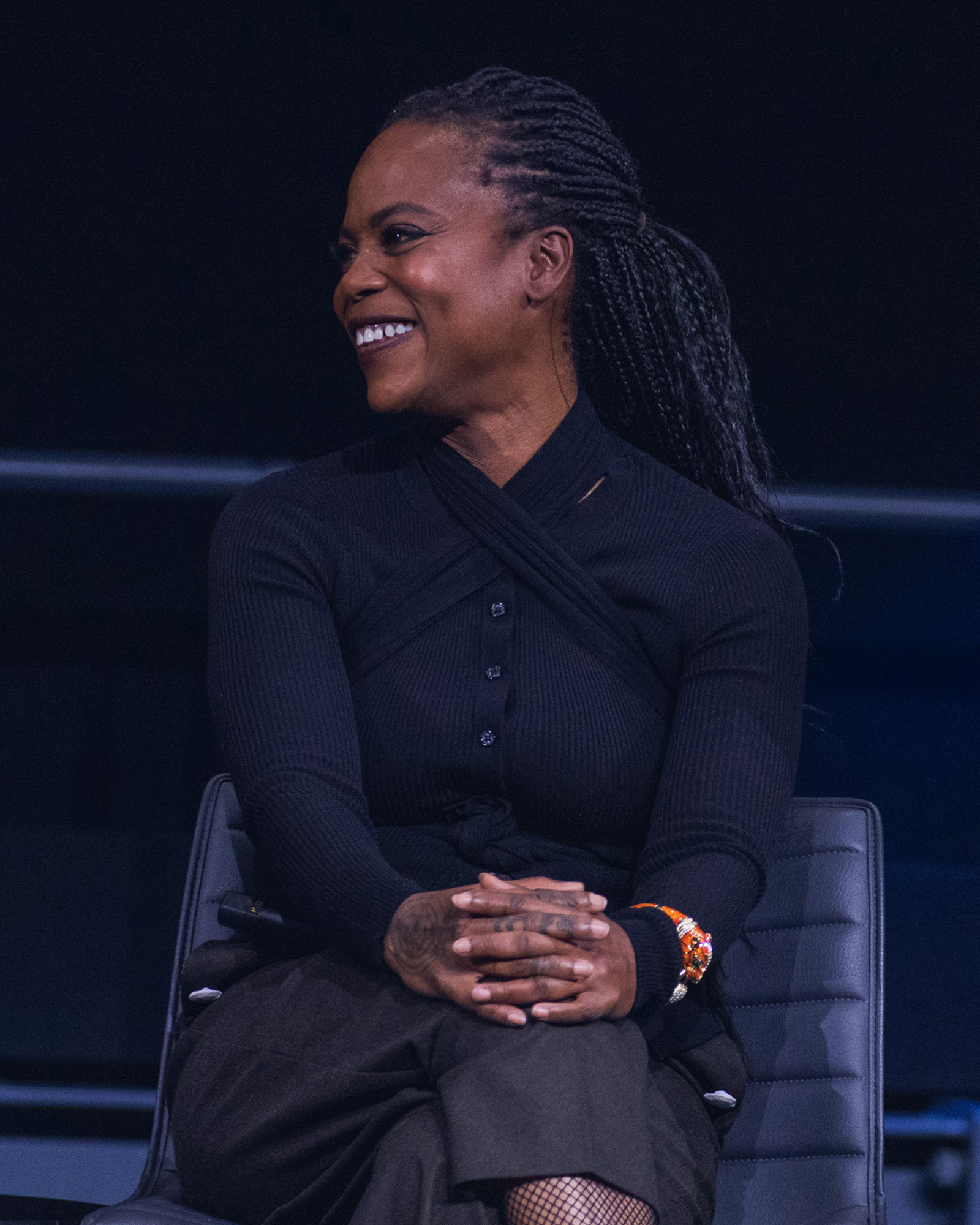
- Beachler in 2025
- Education: University of Cincinnati, Wright State University
- Occupation: Production designer
- Website: www.hannahbeachlerpd.com

Hannah E. Beachler (/biːklər/) is an American production designer. The first African-American to win the Academy Award for Best Production Design, she is known for her Afrofuturist design direction of Marvel Studios film series Black Panther and Black Panther: Wakanda Forever. Beachler has been involved in numerous projects directed by Beyoncé, including Lemonade and Black Is King.

She also worked on the 2015 Rocky film Creed, the Miles Davis biopic Miles Ahead (2015), and Moonlight (2016). She was nominated at the Primetime Emmy Awards and won three ADG Awards, a Critics' Choice Movie Awards and a Saturn Awards.

== Early life and education ==
Beachler, the daughter of an architect and interior decorator, grew up in Centerville, Ohio, United States, being surrounded by design for a long time. She graduated from the University of Cincinnati, studying fashion design. She attended Wright State University in Dayton, Ohio, where she studied film.

== Career ==
She first met Ryan Coogler working on his Fruitvale Station, a film about the shooting of Oscar Grant. It had a limited budget and required Beachler's creativity to come up with low-cost ideas; she used her own Bay Area Rapid Transit card that is seen in the visor of a car Grant is driving. Fruitvale Station won the Grand Jury Prize for Best Film and the Audience Award for Best Film at the Sundance Film Festival in 2013.

For Creed, Beachler watched the first four Rocky films for inspiration. She was responsible for designing Front Street Gym that appears prominently in the film. She visited a number of gyms across the United States, but particularly in Philadelphia where the film series is based, in order to get a good idea of what the set should look like. She designed the entire gym including the professionally-sized boxing ring, and her plans ensured that cameras could get a 360-degree view of everything. In her efforts, she was able to transform a hall within Temple University, into the realistic gym that was seen in the film.

For the outdoor scenes in Miles Ahead, Beachler searched through numerous photograph archives to accurately capture the scenes in New York City from the 1950s to the 1970s, but ultimately took inspiration from some silent film shot from a car window, that was posted on YouTube decades later. She used no stage shots in the entire film; the set of Davis' home was a disused church in Cincinnati that was gutted and renovated to resemble a multi-layer house including a basement recording studio.

As the production designer on Marvel Studios's Black Panther, Beachler oversaw a $30 million art budget and a crew of several hundred people. Beachler is the first-ever female production designer of a Marvel film, and was the second person hired for it behind director Ryan Coogler. To research the project, she first spent time in Cape Town, South Africa, and then traveled the region with the rest of the crew to get a sense of the countryside and cultures represented there. Before beginning the process of working on Black Panther with Coogler, Beachler did not believe she would have this "once in a lifetime opportunity," but to prove herself she worked hard and even ended up spending $12,000 of her own money to prove her capability. "It’s all different, and they’re different countries..." Beachler explained: "you can’t represent everything, but I can certainly interpret the fact that there are so many different things within [its fictional country of] Wakanda and within that one culture." For her work on Black Panther, Beachler became the first African-American to be nominated for the Academy Award for Best Production Design, as well as the first to win the category.

Beachler was lead curator for the Metropolitan Museum of Art exhibition Before Yesterday We Could Fly: An Afrofuturist Period Room, which opened in 2021. Working with commissioners such as Njideka Akunyili Crosby and Jenn Nkiru, Beachler designed this space in hopes that it would embody, "Black imagination, excellence, and self-determination...".

In 2023, she worked on the production design of Renaissance: A Film by Beyoncé.

== Filmography ==
=== Film ===
- Fruitvale Station (2013)
- The Town That Dreaded Sundown (2014)
- Creed (2015)
- Miles Ahead (2015)
- Lemonade (2016)
- Moonlight (2016)
- Black Panther (2018)
- Dark Waters (2019)
- Black Is King (2020)
- No Sudden Move (2021)
- Black Panther: Wakanda Forever (2022)
- Renaissance: A Film by Beyoncé (2023)
- Sinners (2025)

=== Television ===
- On the Run Tour: Beyoncé and Jay-Z (2014)

== Awards and nominations ==
Year	Award	Title of work	Category	Result	Ref.
2016	Primetime Emmy Awards	Lemonade	Outstanding Production Design for Variety, Nonfiction, Event or Award Special	Nominated	
2017	ADG Awards	Lemonade	Excellence in Production Design for an Awards or Event Special	Won	
2018	Hollywood Film Awards	Black Panther	Production Designer of the Year	Won	
2018	Los Angeles Film Critics Association	Black Panther	Best Production Design	Won	
2018	San Francisco Bay Area Film Critics Circle	Black Panther	Best Production Design	Won	
2018	St. Louis Film Critics Association	Black Panther	Best Production Design	Won	
2018	Washington D.C. Area Film Critics Association	Black Panther	Best Production Design	Won	
2018	Saturn Awards	Black Panther	Best Production Design	Won	
2019	Academy Awards	Black Panther	Best Production Design	Won	
2019	ADG Awards	Black Panther	Excellence in Production Design for a Fantasy Film	Won	
2019	Black Reel Awards	Black Panther	Outstanding Production Design	Won	
2019	Critics' Choice Awards	Black Panther	Best Production Design	Won	
2020	ADG Awards	Black Is King	Excellence in Production Design for a Variety Special	Won	
2020	SDSA Awards	Black Is King	Best Achievement in Decor/Design of a Variety Special	Nominated	
2022	St. Louis Gateway Film Critics Association Awards	Black Panther: Wakanda Forever	Best Production Design	Nominated	
2022	Washington D.C. Area Film Critics Association Awards	Black Panther: Wakanda Forever	Best Production Design	Won	
2023	ADG Awards	Black Panther: Wakanda Forever	Excellence in Production Design for a Fantasy Feature Film	Nominated	
2023	African-American Film Critics Association Awards	Black Panther: Wakanda Forever	Building Change Award	Won	
2023	Black Reel Awards	Black Panther: Wakanda Forever	Outstanding Production Design	Won	
2023	Critics' Choice Movie Awards	Black Panther: Wakanda Forever	Best Production Design	Nominated	
2023	Georgia Film Critics Association	Black Panther: Wakanda Forever	Best Production Design	Nominated	
2023	Hollywood Critics Association Creative Arts Awards	Black Panther: Wakanda Forever	Best Production Design	Nominated	
2023	San Francisco Bay Area Film Critics Circle Awards	Black Panther: Wakanda Forever	Best Production Design	Nominated	
2023	Set Decorators Society of America Awards	Black Panther: Wakanda Forever	Best Achievement in Decor/Design of a Science Fiction or Fantasy Feature Film	Nominated	
2023	Hollywood Music in Media Awards	Ladies First: A Story of Women in Hip-Hop	Best Music Documentary – Special Program	Nominated	
2024	Black Reel Awards	Renaissance: A Film by Beyoncé	Outstanding Production Design	Nominated	
2026	Academy Awards	Sinners	Best Production Design	Nominated	
