= List of accolades received by Iron Man (2008 film) =

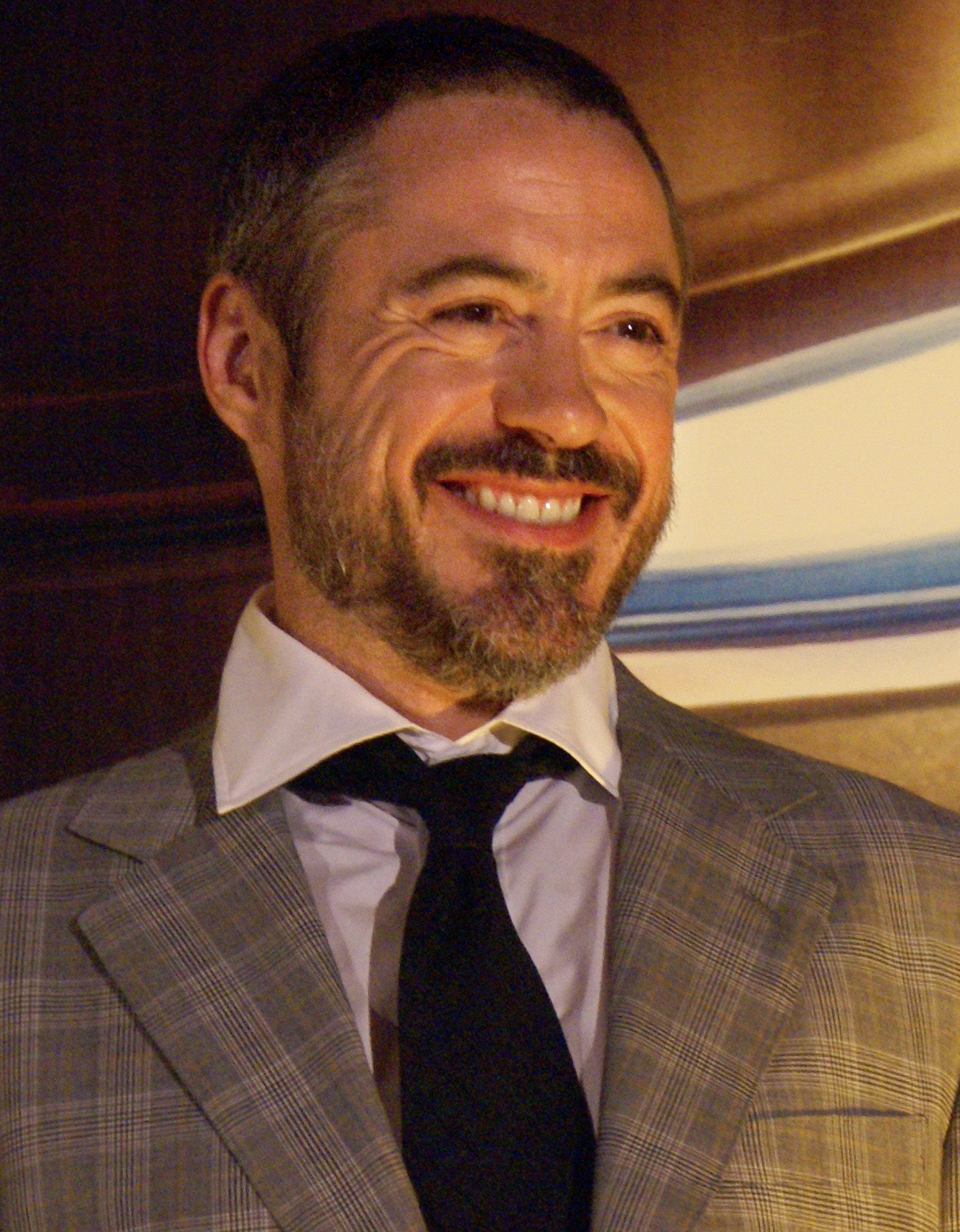
- Robert Downey Jr. promoting Iron Man in 2008. The actor received multiple accolades for his performance in the film.
Awards and nominations
Award	Wins	Nominations
AARP Movies for Grownups Awards	1	1
Academy Awards	0	2
Art Directors Guild Awards	0	1
Artios Awards	0	1
British Academy Film Awards	0	1
Cinema Audio Society Awards	0	1
Costume Designers Guild Awards	0	1
Critics' Choice Awards	0	1
Empire Awards	0	3
Golden Reel Awards	0	3
Golden Trailer Awards	1	2
Grammy Awards	0	1
Hollywood Film Awards	1	1
Hollywood Post Alliance Awards	1	2
Hugo Awards	0	1
Irish Film & Television Awards	1	1
Las Vegas Film Critics Society Sierra Awards	1	1
Movieguide Awards	1	2
MTV Movie Awards	1	3
National Movie Awards	0	2
Nickelodeon Kids' Choice Awards	0	1
People's Choice Awards	0	5
Satellite Awards	2	4
Saturn Awards	3	8
Scream Awards	2	14
Screen Actors Guild Awards	0	1
St. Louis Film Critics Association Awards	0	1
Taurus World Stunt Awards	2	3
Teen Choice Awards	0	4
USC Scripter Awards	0	1
Visual Effects Society Awards	0	5

Totals (Note: Certain award groups do not simply award one winner. They acknowledge several different recipients, have runners-up, and have third place. Since this is a specific recognition and is different from losing an award, runner-up mentions are considered wins in this award tally. For simplification and to avoid errors, each award in this list has been presumed to have had a prior nomination.)
- Wins: 17
- Nominations: 78

Iron Man is a 2008 American superhero film based on the Marvel Comics character Iron Man. Produced by Marvel Studios and distributed by Paramount Pictures, it is the first film in the Marvel Cinematic Universe (MCU). Directed by Jon Favreau and written by the teams of Mark Fergus & Hawk Ostby and Art Marcum & Matt Holloway, the film stars Robert Downey Jr. as Tony Stark / Iron Man alongside Terrence Howard, Jeff Bridges, Gwyneth Paltrow, Leslie Bibb, and Shaun Toub. In the film, world-famous industrialist and master engineer Stark builds a mechanized suit of armor to escape from captivity by a terrorist group, and then uses the suit to become the superhero Iron Man.

The film premiered in Sydney, Australia, on April 14, 2008, and was released in the United States on May 2 as the first film in Phase One of the MCU. Produced on a budget of $150 million, it grossed over $585 million and became the eighth-highest grossing film of 2008. It also received positive reviews from critics, who praised Downey's performance and Favreau's balance of character development and special effects, and was named one of the ten best films of the year by the American Film Institute. In 2022, the Library of Congress selected the film for preservation in the United States National Film Registry for being "culturally, historically, or aesthetically significant".

Iron Man received numerous awards and nominations with particular recognition for Downey's performance, the visual effects, and the sound editing. It was nominated for Best Sound Editing and Best Visual Effects at the 81st Academy Awards, with other accolades including nominations for an Art Directors Guild Award, an Artios Award, a British Academy Film Award, a Cinema Audio Society Award, a Costume Designers Guild Award, a Critics' Choice Award, three Golden Reel Awards, a Grammy Award, a Hugo Award, four Satellite Awards (winning two), eight Saturn Awards (winning three), a Screen Actors Guild Award, and five Visual Effects Society Awards.

== Accolades ==
Accolades received by Iron Man
Award	Date of ceremony	Category	Recipient(s)	Result	Ref.
AARP Movies for Grownups Awards	January 27, 2009	Best Movie for Grownups Who Refuse to Grow Up	Iron Man	Won	
Academy Awards	February 22, 2009	Best Sound Editing	Frank E. Eulner and Christopher Boyes	Nominated	
Academy Awards	February 22, 2009	Best Visual Effects	John Nelson, Ben Snow, Dan Sudick, and Shane Mahan	Nominated	
Art Directors Guild Awards	February 14, 2009	Excellence in Production Design for a Fantasy Film	J. Michael Riva	Nominated	
Artios Awards	November 10, 2008	Outstanding Achievement in Casting: Studio Feature – Drama	Sarah Halley Finn and Randi Hiller	Nominated	
British Academy Film Awards	February 8, 2009	Best Special Visual Effects	Shane Mahan, John Nelson, and Ben Snow	Nominated	
Cinema Audio Society Awards	February 14, 2009	Outstanding Achievement in Sound Mixing for Motion Pictures	Mark Ulano, Christopher Boyes, and Lora Hirschberg	Nominated	
Costume Designers Guild Awards	February 17, 2009	Excellence in Contemporary Film	Rebecca Bentjen and Laura Jean Shannon	Nominated	
Critics' Choice Awards	January 8, 2009	Best Action Movie	Iron Man	Nominated	
Empire Awards	March 29, 2009	Best Film	Iron Man	Nominated	
Empire Awards	March 29, 2009	Best Actor	Robert Downey Jr.	Nominated	
Empire Awards	March 29, 2009	Best Sci-Fi/Fantasy/Superhero Film	Iron Man	Nominated	
Golden Reel Awards	February 22, 2009	Best Sound Editing in Feature Film – Music	Shannon Erbe, Tanya Noel Hill, and David Klotz	Nominated	
Golden Reel Awards	February 22, 2009	Best Sound Editing in Feature Film – Dialogue & ADR	Christopher Boyes, Frank E. Eulner, Michael Silvers, Gwendolyn Yates Whittle, John Nutt, Karen Spangenberg, and Marshall Winn	Nominated	
Golden Reel Awards	February 22, 2009	Best Sound Editing in Feature Film – Sound Effects & Foley	Christopher Boyes, Frank E. Eulner, Shannon Mills, Ken Fischer, J.R. Grubbs, James Likowski, Robert Shoup, Ronni Brown, Ellen Heuer, Dennie Thorpe, and Jana Vance	Nominated	
Golden Trailer Awards	May 8, 2008	Best Action	Iron Man	Nominated	
Golden Trailer Awards	May 8, 2008	Summer 2008 Blockbuster	Iron Man "Escaped"	Won	
Grammy Awards	February 8, 2009	Best Score Soundtrack Album for Motion Picture, Television or Other Visual Media	Ramin Djawadi	Nominated	
Hollywood Film Awards	October 27, 2008	Hollywood Visual Effects Award	John Nelson and Ben Snow	Won	
Hollywood Post Alliance Awards	November 6, 2008	Outstanding Color Grading – Feature Film	Steven J. Scott	Won	
Hollywood Post Alliance Awards	November 6, 2008	Outstanding Editing – Feature Film	Dan Lebental	Nominated	
Hugo Awards	August 6–10, 2009	Best Dramatic Presentation – Long Form	Jon Favreau, Mark Fergus & Hawk Ostby, Art Marcum & Matt Holloway, and Stan Lee & Don Heck & Larry Lieber & Jack Kirby	Nominated	
Irish Film & Television Awards	February 14, 2009	Best International Actor	Robert Downey Jr.	Won	
Las Vegas Film Critics Society Sierra Awards	December 18, 2008	Best Visual Effects	Iron Man	Won	
Movieguide Awards	February 11, 2009	Best Movie for Mature Audiences	Iron Man	Won	
Movieguide Awards	February 11, 2009	Faith and Freedom Award for Movies	Iron Man	Nominated	
MTV Movie Awards	June 1, 2008	Best Summer Movie So Far	Iron Man	Won	
MTV Movie Awards	May 31, 2009	Best Movie	Iron Man	Nominated	
MTV Movie Awards	May 31, 2009	Best Male Performance	Robert Downey Jr.	Nominated	
National Movie Awards	September 8, 2008	Best Superhero Film	Iron Man	Nominated	
National Movie Awards	September 8, 2008	Best Performance – Male	Robert Downey Jr.	Nominated	
Nickelodeon Kids' Choice Awards	March 28, 2009	Favorite Movie	Iron Man	Nominated	
People's Choice Awards	January 7, 2009	Favorite Movie	Iron Man	Nominated	
People's Choice Awards	January 7, 2009	Favorite Action Movie	Iron Man	Nominated	
People's Choice Awards	January 7, 2009	Favorite Male Action Star	Robert Downey Jr.	Nominated	
People's Choice Awards	January 7, 2009	Favorite Male Movie Star	Robert Downey Jr.	Nominated	
People's Choice Awards	January 7, 2009	Favorite Superhero	Robert Downey Jr.	Nominated	
Satellite Awards	December 14, 2008	Best Editing	Dan Lebental	Won	
Satellite Awards	December 14, 2008	Best Sound	Christopher Boyes	Nominated	
Satellite Awards	December 14, 2008	Best Visual Effects	John Nelson, Shane Mahan, Ben Snow, and Dan Sudick	Nominated	
Satellite Awards	December 14, 2008	Best DVD Extras	Iron Man Two-Disc Collector's Edition	Won	
Saturn Awards	June 25, 2009	Best Science Fiction Film	Iron Man	Won	
Saturn Awards	June 25, 2009	Best Actor	Robert Downey Jr.	Won	
Saturn Awards	June 25, 2009	Best Actress	Gwyneth Paltrow	Nominated	
Saturn Awards	June 25, 2009	Best Supporting Actor	Jeff Bridges	Nominated	
Saturn Awards	June 25, 2009	Best Director	Jon Favreau	Won	
Saturn Awards	June 25, 2009	Best Screenplay	Mark Fergus & Hawk Ostby and Art Marcum & Matt Holloway	Nominated	
Saturn Awards	June 25, 2009	Best Music	Ramin Djawadi	Nominated	
Saturn Awards	June 25, 2009	Best Special Effects	John Nelson, Ben Snow, Dan Sudick, and Shane Mahan	Nominated	
Scream Awards	October 18, 2008	Ultimate Scream	Iron Man	Nominated	
Scream Awards	October 18, 2008	Best Science Fiction Movie	Iron Man	Won	
Scream Awards	October 18, 2008	Best Superhero	Robert Downey Jr.	Nominated	
Scream Awards	October 18, 2008	Best Villain	Jeff Bridges	Nominated	
Scream Awards	October 18, 2008	Best Supporting Performance	Terrence Howard	Nominated	
Scream Awards	October 18, 2008	Holy Sh%t Scene of the Year	Escape from Ten Rings Hideout	Nominated	
Scream Awards	October 18, 2008	Holy Sh%t Scene of the Year	Iron Man's First Flight	Nominated	
Scream Awards	October 18, 2008	Best Scream-Play	Mark Fergus & Hawk Ostby and Art Marcum & Matt Holloway	Nominated	
Scream Awards	October 18, 2008	Best Director	Jon Favreau	Nominated	
Scream Awards	October 18, 2008	Best Science Fiction Actor	Robert Downey Jr.	Won	
Scream Awards	October 18, 2008	Best Science Fiction Actress	Gwyneth Paltrow	Nominated	
Scream Awards	October 18, 2008	Best F/X	Iron Man	Nominated	
Scream Awards	October 18, 2008	Best Comic Book Movie	Iron Man	Nominated	
Scream Awards	October 18, 2008	Best Line	"I am Iron Man"	Nominated	
Screen Actors Guild Awards	January 25, 2009	Outstanding Performance by a Stunt Ensemble	Iron Man	Nominated	
St. Louis Film Critics Association Awards	December 15, 2008	Best Visual Effects	John Nelson, Ben Snow, Dan Sudick, and Shane Mahan	Nominated	
Taurus World Stunt Awards	May 16, 2009	Hardest Hit	Gregory James Fitzpatrick	Won	
Taurus World Stunt Awards	May 16, 2009	Best Stunt Coordinator and/or 2nd Unit Director	Thomas R. Harper, Phil Neilson, and Keith Woulard	Nominated	
Taurus World Stunt Awards	May 16, 2009	Best Fire Stunt	Mike Justus, Damien Moreno, and Timothy P. Trella	Won	
Teen Choice Awards	August 4, 2008	Choice Movie: Action	Iron Man	Nominated	
Teen Choice Awards	August 4, 2008	Choice Movie Actor: Action	Robert Downey Jr.	Nominated	
Teen Choice Awards	August 4, 2008	Choice Movie Actress: Action	Gwyneth Paltrow	Nominated	
Teen Choice Awards	August 4, 2008	Choice Movie: Villain	Jeff Bridges	Nominated	
USC Scripter Awards	January 30, 2009	USC Scripter Award	Mark Fergus & Hawk Ostby and Art Marcum & Matt Holloway	Nominated	
Visual Effects Society Awards	February 10, 2009	Outstanding Visual Effects in a Visual Effects-Driven Feature Motion Picture	Ben Snow, Hal Hickel, Victoria Alonso, and John Nelson	Nominated	
Visual Effects Society Awards	February 10, 2009	Best Single Visual Effect of the Year	Ben Snow, Wayne Billheimer, Victoria Alonso, and John Nelson	Nominated	
Visual Effects Society Awards	February 10, 2009	Outstanding Animated Character in a Live Action Motion Picture	Hal Hickel, Bruce Holcomb, James Tooley, and John Walker	Nominated	
Visual Effects Society Awards	February 10, 2009	Outstanding Models and Miniatures in a Feature Motion Picture	Aaron McBride, Russell Paul, Gerald Gutschmidt, and Kenji Yamaguchi (for Suit Up Machine)	Nominated	
Visual Effects Society Awards	February 10, 2009	Outstanding Compositing in a Feature Motion Picture	Jonathan Rothbart, Dav Rauch, Kyle McCulloch, and Kent Seki (for HUD Compositing)	Nominated	
