= Victoria Alonso =

Argentine film producer

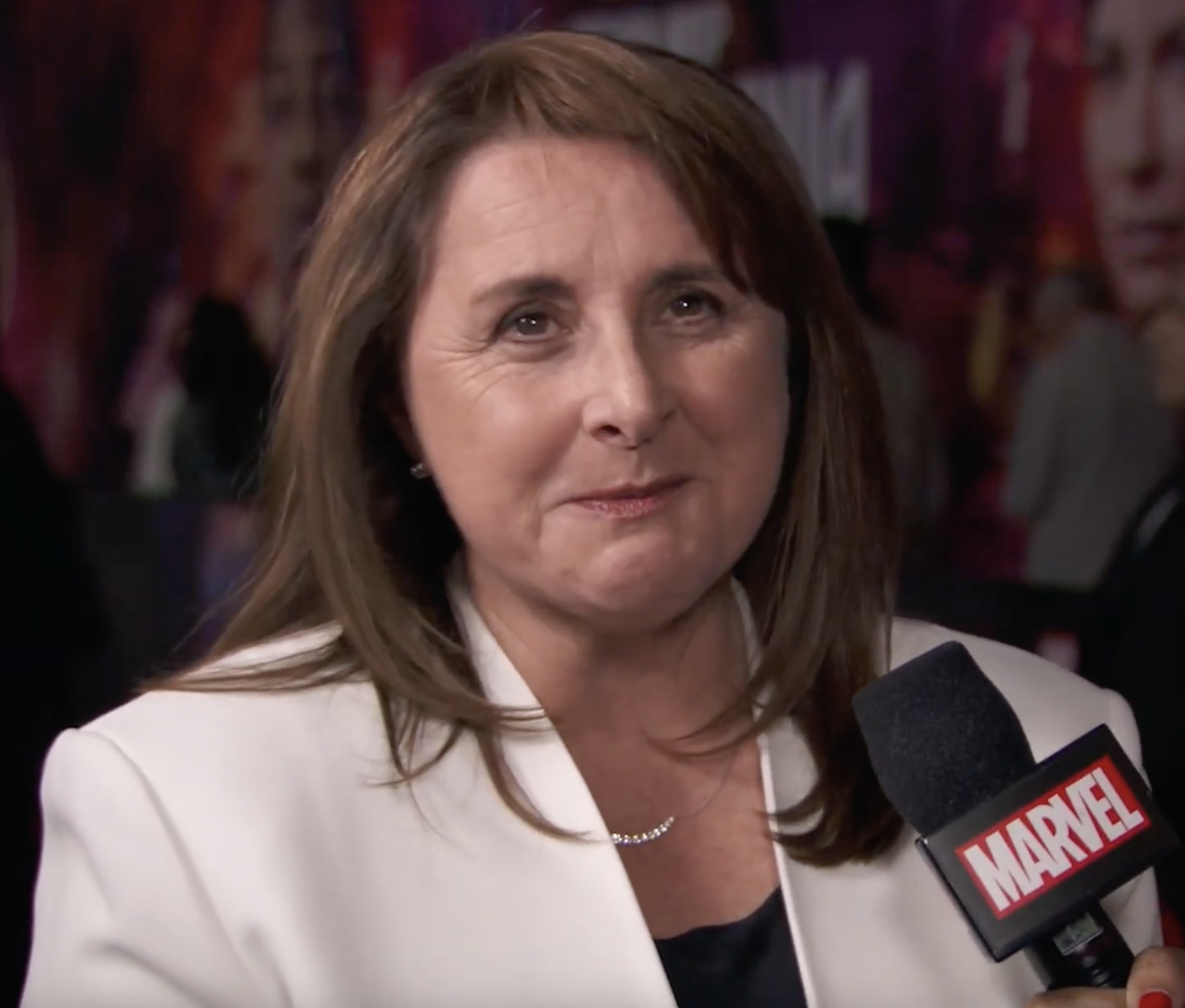
- Alonso in 2023
- Born: 22 December 1965 (age 60); La Plata, Argentina
- Occupations: Film producer; studio executive
- Years active: 1996–present
- Notable work: Marvel Cinematic Universe
- Spouse: Imelda Corcoran
- Children: 1

Victoria Alonso (born 22 December 1965) is an Argentine film producer who formerly served as the president of physical and post-production, visual effects, and animation at Marvel Studios.

== Early life and education ==
Victoria Alonso was born on 22 December 1965 in La Plata, Buenos Aires Province, Argentina.

== Career ==
Alonso moved to Seattle at the age of 19 to pursue an acting career. She relocated again to Los Angeles, where she began working in the visual effects industry, including at Digital Domain as a visual effects producer for four years, working on films such as Big Fish (2003), which was nominated for Best Special Visual Effects at the 57th British Academy Film Awards.

Alonso joined Marvel Studios in 2005 as executive vice president of visual effects and post-production, working as a co-producer on Marvel Cinematic Universe films Iron Man (2008), Iron Man 2 (2010), Thor (2010), and Captain America: The First Avenger (2011), and serving as executive producer on every Marvel Studios production since The Avengers (2012), including television shows. She was promoted to executive vice president of production in 2015. In 2021, Alonso was promoted to president of physical and post-production, visual effects, and animation at Marvel Studios.

In 2016, Alonso became the first woman to win the Advanced Imaging Society's Harold Lloyd Award for her achievements in visual effects. In January 2020, she was awarded the Filmmaker Award by the Motion Picture Sound Editors at the 67th Golden Reel Awards. In October 2021, it was announced that Alonso would be the top honoree at Outfest's Visionary Award at the November ceremony at LA's Academy Museum of Motion Pictures.

In December 2022, she was named on The Hollywood Reporter's "Women in Entertainment Power 100".

=== Firing from Marvel Studios ===
In 2023, Alonso was fired from her role at Marvel Studios for breach of contract after violating her noncompete clause by serving as a producer on the Amazon Studios film Argentina, 1985, having failed to seek permission to work on the film, and continuing to promote it after being ordered by Disney to cease her involvement with the project.

At the time of her firing, criticism from VFX workers were noted, who had raised complaints of Marvel's "demanding post-production schedules". Alonso was described by some as a "kingmaker", with Chris Lee at Vulture reporting that Alonso was "singularly responsible for Marvel's toxic work environment." However, Alonso was also described as the "epitome of professional" and supportive on set, with Joanna Robinson of The Ringer describing the reports as a "gross mischaracterization" and the opposite of Alonso's work. Alonso said that the real reason for her firing was her outspoken opposition to LGBTQ+ erasure at the company. Disney and Alonso reached a multi-million dollar compensation settlement in April.

== Personal life ==
Alonso is openly gay and is married to Australian actress Imelda Corcoran. The couple has one adopted daughter.

== Filmography ==
=== Feature films ===
| Year | Title | Role | Ref. |
|---|---|---|---|
| 2000 | Sordid Lives | Producer | |
| 2000 | The 6th Day | Visual effects producer | |
| 2001 | Shrek | Visual effects producer | |
| 2001 | Cats & Dogs | Visual effects producer | |
| 2003 | Darkness Falls | Visual effects producer | |
| 2003 | The Core | Visual effects producer | |
| 2003 | Big Fish | Visual effects producer | |
| 2004 | 50 First Dates | Visual effects producer | |
| 2005 | Kingdom of Heaven | Visual effects producer | |
| 2008 | Iron Man | Co-producer; Visual effects producer | |
| 2010 | Iron Man 2 | Co-producer | |
| 2011 | Thor | Co-producer | |
| 2011 | Captain America: The First Avenger | Co-producer | |
| 2012 | The Avengers | Executive producer | |
| 2013 | Iron Man 3 | Executive producer | |
| 2013 | Thor: The Dark World | Executive producer | |
| 2014 | Captain America: The Winter Soldier | Executive producer | |
| 2014 | Guardians of the Galaxy | Executive producer | |
| 2015 | Avengers: Age of Ultron | Executive producer | |
| 2015 | Ant-Man | Executive producer | |
| 2016 | Captain America: Civil War | Executive producer | |
| 2016 | Doctor Strange | Executive producer | |
| 2017 | Guardians of the Galaxy Vol. 2 | Executive producer | |
| 2017 | Spider-Man: Homecoming | Executive producer | |
| 2017 | Thor: Ragnarok | Executive producer | |
| 2018 | Black Panther | Executive producer | |
| 2018 | Avengers: Infinity War | Executive producer | |
| 2018 | Ant-Man and the Wasp | Executive producer | |
| 2019 | Captain Marvel | Executive producer | |
| 2019 | Avengers: Endgame | Executive producer | |
| 2019 | Spider-Man: Far From Home | Executive producer | |
| 2021 | Black Widow | Executive producer | |
| 2021 | Shang-Chi and the Legend of the Ten Rings | Executive producer | |
| 2021 | Eternals | Executive producer | |
| 2021 | Spider-Man: No Way Home | Executive producer | |
| 2022 | Doctor Strange in the Multiverse of Madness | Executive producer | |
| 2022 | Thor: Love and Thunder | Executive producer | |
| 2022 | Black Panther: Wakanda Forever | Executive producer | |
| 2022 | Argentina, 1985 | Producer; also contributed to the song "Nunca más" | |
| 2023 | Ant-Man and the Wasp: Quantumania | Executive producer | |
| 2023 | Guardians of the Galaxy Vol. 3 | Executive producer | |
| 2023 | The Marvels | Executive producer | |
| 2026 | Baton | Producer | |
| TBA | Iron Jane | Producer | |

=== Television ===
Executive produced
| Year | Title | Notes | Ref. |
|---|---|---|---|
| 2021 | WandaVision | 9 episodes | |
| 2021 | The Falcon and the Winter Soldier | 6 episodes | |
| 2021–2023 | Loki | 12 episodes | |
| 2021–2024 | What If...? | 26 episodes | |
| 2021 | Hawkeye | 6 episodes | |
| 2022 | Moon Knight | 6 episodes | |
| 2022 | Ms. Marvel | 6 episodes | |
| 2022–2023 | I Am Groot | 10 episodes | |
| 2022 | She-Hulk: Attorney at Law | 9 episodes | |
| 2022 | Werewolf by Night | TV special | |
| 2022 | The Guardians of the Galaxy Holiday Special | TV special | |
| 2023 | Secret Invasion | 6 episodes | |
| 2024 | Echo | 5 episodes | |
| 2024 | X-Men '97 | 10 episodes | |

== Accolades ==
| Year | Film | Award | Category | Result | Ref. |
|---|---|---|---|---|---|
| 2006 | Kingdom of Heaven | Visual Effects Society Awards | Outstanding Supporting Visual Effects in a Motion Picture (with Wesley Sewell, Tom Wood, Gary Brozenich) | Won | |
| 2009 | Iron Man | Visual Effects Society Awards | Outstanding Visual Effects in a Photoreal Feature (with Ben Snow, Hal Hickel, John Nelson) | Nominated | |
| 2009 | Iron Man | Visual Effects Society Awards | Best Single Visual Effect of the Year (with Ben Snow, Wayne Billheimer, John Nelson) | Nominated | |
| 2019 | Avengers: Endgame | Hollywood Film Awards | Hollywood Blockbuster Award (with Kevin Feige) | Won | |
| 2024 | X-Men '97 | Gotham TV Awards | Breakthrough Drama Series (with Beau DeMayo, Louis D'Esposito, Kevin Feige, and Brad Winderbaum) | Nominated | |
