= Ed Hirsh =

- Other names: Edward Hirsch; Edward Hirsh; Ed T. Hirsh; Edward T. Hirsh
- Occupation: Visual effects artist
- Years active: 1980–present

Ed Hirsh is a special effects artist who was nominated at the 74th Academy Awards in the category of Best Visual Effects for his work on Pearl Harbor. He shared his nomination with Eric Brevig, John Frazier and Ben Snow.

He is a member of Industrial Light & Magic as well and has worked on many of the movies by them.

== Selected filmography ==
- Empire Strikes Back (1980)
- Raiders of the Lost Ark (1981)
- E.T. the Extra-Terrestrial (1982)
- Star Trek II: The Wrath of Khan (1982)
- Return of the Jedi (1983)
- Indiana Jones and the Temple of Doom (1984)
- Star Trek IV: The Voyage Home (1986)
- Innerspace (1987)
- Willow (1988)
- Ghostbusters II (1989)
- Indiana Jones and the Last Crusade (1989)
- Die Hard 2 (1990)
- Backdraft (1991)
- Hook (1991)
- The Rocketeer (1991)
- Star Trek Generations (1994)
- The Lost World: Jurassic Park (1997)
- Men in Black (1997)
- Galaxy Quest (1999)
- Wild Wild West (1999)
- Pearl Harbor (2001)
- Hulk (2003)
- War of the Worlds (2005)
- WALL-E (2008)
- Terminator Salvation (2009)
