= Ben Snow =

Australian visual effects supervisor

- Education: Narrabundah College; University of Canberra
- Occupation: Visual effects artist
- Years active: 1994–present
- Employer: Industrial Light & Magic

Ben Snow is an Australian visual effects artist who has been nominated four times at the Academy Awards. He works at Industrial Light & Magic.

== Early life ==
Snow grew up in Australia, where he attended Narrabundah College and the University of Canberra. His university degree, which he completed in 1986, was a Bachelor of Arts in Computer Studies.

== Oscar history ==
All 4 films were in the category of Best Visual Effects

- 74th Academy Awards-Nominated for Pearl Harbor. Nomination shared with Eric Brevig, John Frazier and Ed Hirsh. Lost to The Lord of the Rings: The Fellowship of the Ring.
- 75th Academy Awards-Nominated for Star Wars: Episode II – Attack of the Clones. Nomination shared with Rob Coleman, Pablo Helman and John Knoll. Lost to The Lord of the Rings: The Two Towers.
- 81st Academy Awards-Nominated for Iron Man. Nomination shared with Shane Mahan, John Nelson and Dan Sudick. Lost to The Curious Case of Benjamin Button.
- 83rd Academy Awards-Nominated for Iron Man 2. Nomination shared with Janek Sirrs, Dan Sudick and Ged Wright. Lost to Inception.

== Filmography ==
- Venom: The Last Dance (2024)
- Twisters (2024)
- Dungeons and Dragons: Honour Among Thieves (2023)
- Godmothered (2020)
- Mother! (2017)
- The Great Wall (2016)
- Avengers: Age of Ultron (2015)
- Noah (2014)
- Pirates of the Caribbean: On Stranger Tides (2011)
- Iron Man 2 (2010)
- Terminator Salvation (2009)
- Iron Man (2008)
- The Spiderwick Chronicles (2007)
- King Kong (2005)
- Van Helsing (2004)
- Star Wars: Episode II – Attack of the Clones (2002)
- Pearl Harbor (2001)
- Galaxy Quest (1999)
- The Mummy (1999)
- Deep Impact (1998)
- The Lost World: Jurassic Park (1997)
- Mars Attacks! (1996)
- Twister (1996)
- Casper (1995)
- Star Trek Generations (1994)
