= Pearl Harbor (film) =

2001 film by Michael Bay

- Theatrical release poster
- Directed by: Michael Bay
- Written by: Randall Wallace
- Produced by: Jerry Bruckheimer; Michael Bay
- Starring: Ben Affleck; Josh Hartnett; Kate Beckinsale; Cuba Gooding Jr.; Tom Sizemore; Jon Voight; Colm Feore; Alec Baldwin
- Cinematography: John Schwartzman
- Edited by: Chris Lebenzon; Mark Goldblatt; Steven Rosenblum; Roger Barton
- Music by: Hans Zimmer
- Production companies: Touchstone Pictures; Jerry Bruckheimer Films
- Distributed by: Buena Vista Pictures Distribution
- Release dates: May 21, 2001 (Pearl Harbor); May 25, 2001 (United States)
- Running time: 183 minutes
- Country: United States
- Languages: English; Japanese
- Budget: $140 million
- Box office: $449.2 million

Pearl Harbor is a 2001 American romantic war drama film directed by Michael Bay, produced by Bay and Jerry Bruckheimer and written by Randall Wallace. The film stars Ben Affleck, Josh Hartnett, Kate Beckinsale, Cuba Gooding Jr., Tom Sizemore, Jon Voight, Colm Feore, and Alec Baldwin.

The plot is primarily set in a fictionalized version of the attack on Pearl Harbor, and surrounds the love triangle among life-long best friends Rafe and Danny, including the lead-up to the attack, its aftermath, and the Doolittle Raid.

The film was released on May 25, 2001, and was a box office success, grossing $59 million in its opening weekend and $449.2 million worldwide, becoming the sixth-highest-grossing film of 2001. Critics gave it generally mixed reviews for the acting, script, length, and historical inaccuracies, but praised the visual effects, action sequences and musical score. The film's divided critical response was reflected in both the Academy Awards and the Golden Raspberry Awards. It was nominated for four Oscars, winning in the category of Best Sound Editing, but was also nominated for six Golden Raspberry Awards, including Worst Picture.

== Plot ==
In 1923, best friends Rafe McCawley and Danny Walker play together in the back of a biplane owned by Rafe's father in Tennessee, pretending to be combat airmen.

By 1941, Danny and Rafe are first lieutenants in the US Army Air Force under the command of Major Jimmy Doolittle. The United States has not yet entered World War II so Rafe volunteers for the Eagle Squadron, a RAF unit for American volunteer pilots. Nurse Evelyn Johnson signs off Rafe's medical exam despite his dyslexia. Four weeks later Rafe and Evelyn, now deeply in love, enjoy an evening at a nightclub and later a jaunt in the New York Harbor in a borrowed police boat. Rafe shocks Evelyn by announcing he's leaving for England the next day.

During the Battle of Britain, Rafe is shot down during a mission to intercept a Luftwaffe bombing raid and is presumed killed in action. Danny and Evelyn mourn Rafe's death together, which spurs a new romance between them. On the night of December 6, Evelyn is shocked to discover Rafe standing outside her door, having survived his downing and the ensuing months trapped in Nazi-occupied France. He, in turn, discovers Danny's romance with Evelyn and leaves for the Hula bar, where he is welcomed back by his fellow pilots. Danny finds a drunken Rafe in the bar with the intention of reconciling, but they get into a fight. They flee from the military police together and fall asleep in Danny's car.

The Imperial Japanese Navy attacks Pearl Harbor the next morning. The US Pacific Fleet is severely damaged in the surprise attack, and most of the defending airfields are destroyed before they can launch fighters to defend the harbor. Rafe and Danny take off in P-40 fighter planes and shoot down several attacking Zeros. They later assist in the rescue of the crew of the capsized USS Oklahoma, but are too late to save the crew of the USS Arizona.

The next day, President Franklin Delano Roosevelt delivers his Day of Infamy Speech and requests the US Congress declare war on the Empire of Japan. Danny and Rafe are assigned to travel to the continental US with Doolittle. Before they leave, Evelyn reveals to Rafe she is pregnant with Danny's child. Evelyn reassures Rafe she loved him in the past and will love him her whole life, but says she is ready to give Danny her "whole heart" and have their family together.

Danny and Rafe are promotioned to captain and receive Silver Stars for their actions at Pearl Harbor. They volunteer for a secret mission organized by Doolittle and spend three months training for ultra-short takeoffs with specially modified B-25 Mitchell bombers. In April, the group departs aboard USS Hornet and are learn their mission is to bomb Japan. The mission is successful and Rafe and Danny's planes run out of fuel and crash in Japanese-occupied China. Danny is mortally wounded in a gunfight with Japanese soldiers before the group is rescued by Chinese troops. Rafe tearfully reveals to Danny, "you're going to be a father"; with his last breath, Danny replies, "No, you are."

Rafe and Evelyn marry after the war and visit Danny's grave with Evelyn's son, named Danny after his biological father. Rafe takes his family flying into the sunset in Rafe's father's old biplane.

== Cast ==
=== Fictitious characters ===
- Ben Affleck as the First Lieutenant / Captain Rafe McCawley, a USAAC combat pilot. He is childhood friends with Danny Walker.
  - Jesse James as Young Rafe McCawley.
- Josh Hartnett as First Lieutenant / Captain Danny Walker, a USAAC combat pilot and Rafe's lifelong best friend.
  - Reiley McClendon as Young Danny Walker.
- Kate Beckinsale as Lieutenant Evelyn Johnson, a nurse and Rafe and Danny's mutual love interest.
- Tom Sizemore as Sergeant Earl Sistern, the lead aircraft mechanic at Wheeler Airfield.
- Jaime King as Betty Bayer, a nurse at Pearl Harbor Naval Hospital and colleague of Evelyn's.
- Catherine Kellner as Barbara, a nurse at Pearl Harbor Naval Hospital and colleague of Evelyn's.
- Jennifer Garner as Sandra, a nurse at Pearl Harbor Naval Hospital and colleague of Evelyn's.
- Sara Rue as Martha, a nurse at Pearl Harbor Naval Hospital and colleague of Evelyn's.
- William Lee Scott as First Lieutenant Billy Thompson, a USAAC combat pilot stationed at Wheeler Airfield.
- Ewen Bremner as First Lieutenant "Red" Winkle, a USAAC combat pilot stationed at Wheeler Airfield.
- Greg Zola as First Lieutenant Anthony Fusco, a USAAC combat pilot stationed at Wheeler Airfield.
- Michael Shannon as First Lieutenant "Gooz" Wood, a USAAC combat pilot stationed at Wheeler Airfield
- Matt Davis as Second Lieutenant Joe McKinnon, a USAAC combat pilot stationed at Wheeler Airfield.
- Dan Aykroyd as Captain Harold Thurman, a US Naval Intelligence officer overseeing the monitoring of Japanese espionage efforts. He is a fictionalized composite of several real-world individuals.
- Kim Coates as Lieutenant Jack Richards, a United States Naval Aviator who participates in the Doolittle Raid.
- Tony Curran as Ian, a Royal Air Force combat pilot in Eagle Squadron.
- Nicholas Farrell as a Royal Air Force squadron leader and combat pilot commanding the Eagle Squadron.
- William Fichtner as Mr. Walker, Danny's father.
- Steve Rankin as Mr. McCawley, Rafe's father.
- John Fujioka as General Nishikura, head of the Japanese Supreme War Council. He is a fictionalized composite of several real-world individuals.
- Leland Orser as Major Jackson, a USAAC officer injured during the attack on Pearl Harbor.
- Ted McGinley as Major Newman, a US Army officer.
- Andrew Bryniarski as Joe, a crew member and amateur boxer aboard USS West Virginia.
- Brandon Lozano as Baby Danny Walker, Danny and Evelyn's son and Rafe's stepson.
- Eric Christian Olsen as a B-25 gunner to McCawley.
- Sean Faris as a B-25 gunner to Walker.
- Wesley Sullivan as a sailor fishing when Japan begins bombing.

=== Historical characters ===
Although not intended to be an entirely accurate depiction of events, the film includes portrayals of several historical figures:

- Cuba Gooding Jr. as Petty Officer Second Class Doris Miller, a messman aboard USS West Virginia who operated anti-aircraft guns during the attack on Pearl Harbor.
- Jon Voight as President Franklin D. Roosevelt, the 32nd President of the United States
- Colm Feore as Admiral Husband E. Kimmel, the commander-in-chief of the United States Fleet and the U.S. Pacific Fleet.
- Mako as Kaigun Taishō (admiral) Isoroku Yamamoto, Fleet Admiral of the Imperial Japanese Navy and mastermind of the attack on Pearl Harbor.
- Alec Baldwin as Major (later Lieutenant Colonel) Jimmy Doolittle, USAF commander and leader of the Doolittle Raid.
- Cary-Hiroyuki Tagawa as Kaigun Chūsa (commander) Minoru Genda, lead planner of the attack on Pearl Harbor.
- Scott Wilson as General George C. Marshall, the US Army's Chief of Staff.
- Graham Beckel as Admiral Chester W. Nimitz, a US Naval commander who later succeeded Kimmel as the Pacific Fleet's Commander-in-Chief.
- Tom Everett as Frank Knox, Secretary of the Navy.
- Tomas Arana as Rear-Admiral Frank Jack Fletcher, Commander Cruiser Division Four.
- Peter Firth as Captain Mervyn S. Bennion, commanding officer of USS West Virginia
- Glenn Morshower as Vice Admiral William F. Halsey, commander of Carrier Division 2 and the Aircraft Battle Force.
- Yuji Okumoto as Kaigun-Daii (Lieutenant) Zenji Abe (1916-2007), bomber pilot in the attack on Pearl Harbor.
- Madison Mason as Admiral Raymond A. Spruance, commander of Cruiser Division Five.
- Michael Shamus Wiles as Captain Marc Mitscher, captain of USS Hornet.
- Seth Sakai as Takeo Yoshikawa, a Japanese spy.

== Production ==
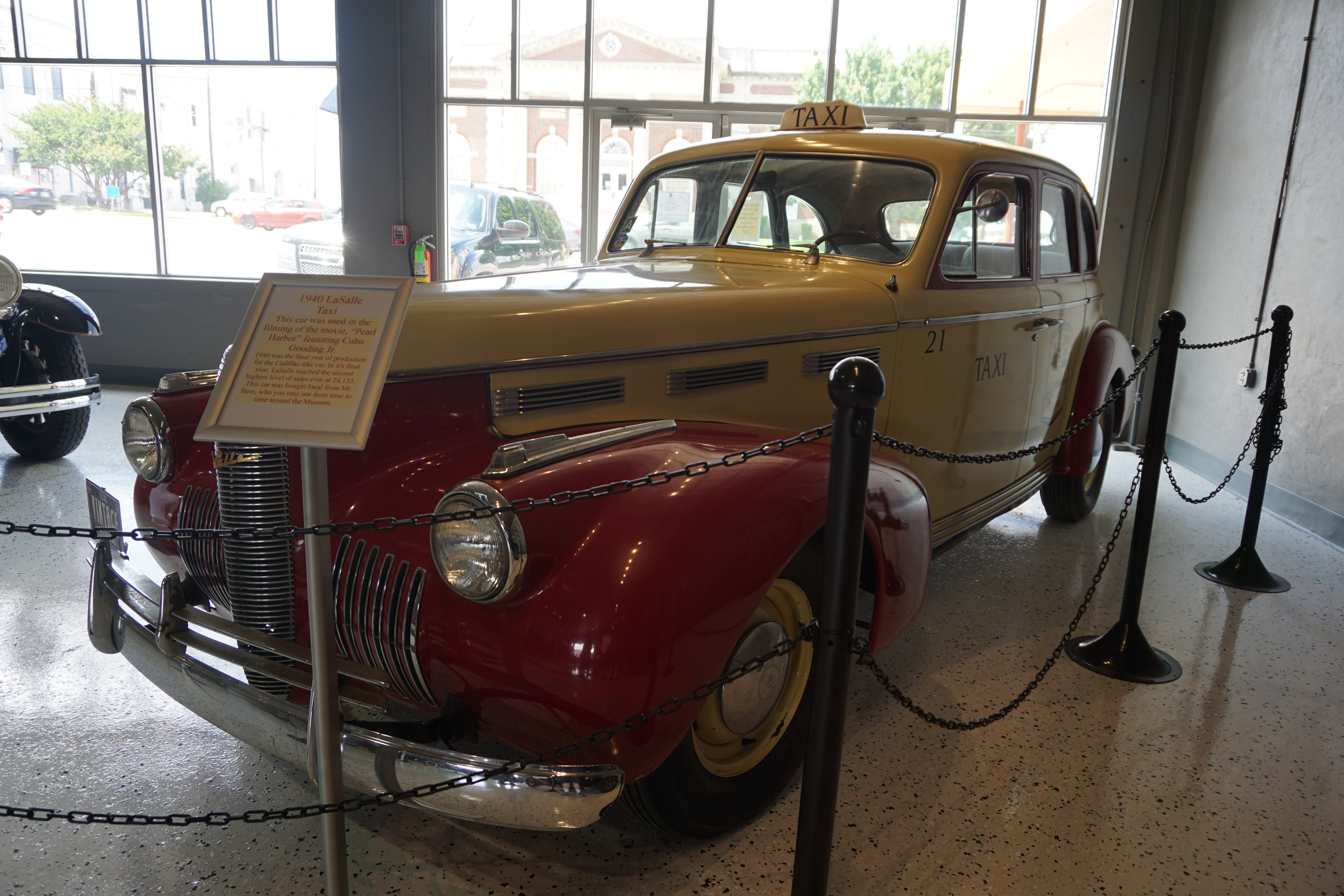
A 1940 LaSalle taxi featured in Pearl Harbor

The proposed budget of $208 million that Michael Bay and Jerry Bruckheimer wanted was an area of contention with Walt Disney Studios executives, since a great deal of the budget was to be expended on production aspects. The budget was eventually reduced to $140 million. Even at the reduced budget, Disney managed to get many of the crew and others to defer some of their pay until the film grossed in the region of $140 million. This included the director of photography, the editor, production designer and lighting director and their departments deferring around $5 to $10 million as well as Panavision, Technicolor and Industrial Light & Magic also agreeing to deferrals. Bay also deferred his salary but he and Bruckheimer were the only ones to receive profit participation.

Also controversial was the effort to change the film's rating from R to PG-13. Bay initially wanted to graphically portray the horrors of war and was not interested in primarily marketing the final product to a teen and young adult audience. However, even though he wanted to make an R-rated movie, Bay admitted that the problem was that young children would not be able to see it, and he felt that they should. As such, when he was ordered by Disney to make a PG-13 film, he did not argue. As a compromise, he was allowed to release an R-rated Director's Cut on DVD later on in 2002. Budget fights continued throughout the planning of the film, with Bay "walking" on several occasions. Dick Cook, chairman of Disney at the time, said "I think Pearl Harbor was one of the most difficult shoots of modern history."

In order to recreate the atmosphere of pre-war Pearl Harbor, the producers staged the film in Hawaii and used current naval facilities. Many active duty military members stationed in Hawaii and members of the local population served as extras during the filming. The set at Rosarito Beach in the Mexican state of Baja California was used for scale model work as required. Formerly the set of Titanic (1997), Rosarito was the ideal location to recreate the death throes of the battleships in the Pearl Harbor attack. A large-scale model of the bow section of USS Oklahoma mounted on the world's largest gimbal produced an authentic rolling and submerging of the doomed battleship. Production Engineer Nigel Phelps stated that the sequence of ship rolling out of the water and slapping down would involve one of the "biggest set elements" to be staged. Matched with computer generated imagery, the action had to reflect precision and accuracy throughout. Production was due to commence April 8, 2000 for 85 days.

Michael Fassbender read for the part of Rafe. Fassbender later said that Disney sent him a "really nice note" telling him that he did not get the part. Matt Damon was initially planned to portray the role of Danny Walker, but he went with Ocean's Eleven instead. Charlize Theron turned down the role of Evelyn so that she could star in Sweet November. Neve Campbell auditioned and was offered a part, but had to turn it down due to scheduling conflicts.

The vessel most seen in the movie was USS Lexington, representing both USS Hornet and a Japanese carrier. All aircraft take-offs during the movie were filmed on board the Lexington, a museum ship in Corpus Christi, Texas. The aircraft on display were removed for filming and were replaced with film aircraft as well as World War II anti-aircraft turrets. Other ships used in filler scenes included USS Hornet, and USS Constellation during filming for the carrier sequences. Filming was also done on board the museum battleship USS Texas located near Houston, Texas. The Naval Historical Center of the United States army was involved in the production of the film, the Center suggested changing the depiction of Doolittle who they considered to be written as "a boorish, oafish guy", this recommendation was accepted.

== Release ==
=== Marketing ===
The teaser trailer premiered in June 2000 in front of The Patriot's theatrical screenings. Disney premiered the film at Pearl Harbor itself, aboard the active nuclear aircraft carrier USS John C. Stennis, which made a six-day trip from San Diego to serve as "the world's largest and most expensive outdoor theater". More than 2,000 people attended the premiere on the Stennis, which had special grandstand seating and one of the world's largest movie screens assembled on the flight deck. The guests included various Hawaii political leaders, most of the lead actors from the film, and over 500 news media from around the world that Disney flew in to cover the event. The party was estimated to have cost Disney $5 million.

=== Box office ===
During its opening weekend, Pearl Harbor generated a total of $59 million, then made $75.1 million during its first four days. At the time, it achieved the second-highest Memorial Day weekend gross, behind The Lost World: Jurassic Park. The film also had the fourth-highest opening weekend, after the latter film, The Mummy Returns and Star Wars: Episode I – The Phantom Menace. For 15 years, it would have the highest opening weekend for a Ben Affleck film until 2016 when Batman v Superman: Dawn of Justice surpassed it. When the film was released, it topped the box office, knocking out Shrek. It earned $30 million during its second weekend while staying at the number one spot ahead of the latter film, Moulin Rouge!, What's the Worst That Could Happen? and The Animal. This was the most recent film to top the box office for multiple weeks until that August when American Pie 2 became the next one to do so. The film would then drop into third place behind Swordfish and Shrek, making $14.9 million and beating out fourth place newcomer Evolution.

In Japan, the film opened on 424 screens and grossed $7.2 million in its opening weekend (including $1.6 million in previews), a record for Buena Vista International in Japan, and the sixth highest opening of all-time. Meanwhile, Pearl Harbor generated a three-day gross of $4.5 million in the United Kingdom, becoming the country's fourth-highest June opening weekend, behind Batman & Robin, The Matrix and The Mummy. It had a record opening in China, grossing $3.9 million in 6 days. The film also made $2.5 million in Mexico, making it the fifth-highest opening for a live-action film in the country, trailing The Phantom Menace, The Mummy Returns, Mission: Impossible 2 and Godzilla. Making $870,000, it was Argentina's second-highest opening of 2001, after Hannibal.

Pearl Harbor grossed $198,542,554 at the US and Canadian box office and $250,678,391 overseas for a worldwide total of $449,220,945, making this the sixth-highest-grossing film of 2001. It is also the third-highest-grossing romantic drama film of all time, as of January 2013, behind Titanic and Ghost.

=== Home media ===
Pearl Harbor was released on VHS and DVD on December 4, 2001 by Buena Vista Home Entertainment (under the Touchstone Home Video label). Both home video versions are THX certified, featuring a historical documentary and a music video, while also having the film split into two parts. The VHS release has two separate cassettes and comes with widescreen and fullscreen versions. As for the DVD release, it includes two separate discs that feature the first and second halves of the film, along with Dolby Headphone and DTS audio tracks. In its first week, the film sold more than 7 million units and made more than $130 million in retail sales.

On July 2, 2002, Buena Vista Home Entertainment released the film on an R-rated four-disc Director's Cut DVD, which included about a minute of additional footage. This release also features three audio commentaries. The first one has Michael Bay and Jeanine Basinger, which was recorded 250 hours after the September 11 attacks.

At the 5th Annual DVD awards, Pearl Harbor won the Best Audio Presentation category, tying with Star Wars: Episode I – The Phantom Menace.

== Reception ==
=== Critical response ===
On Rotten Tomatoes, Pearl Harbor holds an approval rating of 24% based on 194 reviews, with an average rating of 4.5/10. The site's critical consensus reads: "Pearl Harbor tries to be the Titanic of war movies, but it's just a tedious romance filled with laughably bad dialogue. The 40-minute action sequence is spectacular though." On Metacritic, the film has a score of 44 out of 100 based on 35 reviews, indicating "mixed or average reviews". Audiences surveyed by CinemaScore gave the film a grade "A−" on scale of A to F.

Chicago Sun-Times critic Roger Ebert gave the film one and a half stars, writing: "Pearl Harbor is a two-hour movie squeezed into three hours, about how, on Dec. 7, 1941, the Japanese staged a surprise attack on an American love triangle. Its centerpiece is 40 minutes of redundant special effects, surrounded by a love story of stunning banality. The film has been directed without grace, vision, or originality, and although you may walk out quoting lines of dialogue, it will not be because you admire them." Ebert also criticized the liberties the film took with historical facts: "There is no sense of history, strategy or context; according to this movie, Japan attacked Pearl Harbor because America cut off its oil supply, and they were down to an 18-month reserve. Would going to war restore the fuel sources? Did they perhaps also have imperialist designs? Movie doesn't say." In his later "Great Movies" essay on Lawrence of Arabia, Ebert likewise wrote, "What you realize watching Lawrence of Arabia is that the word 'epic' refers not to the cost or the elaborate production, but to the size of the ideas and vision. Werner Herzog's Aguirre, the Wrath of God didn't cost as much as the catering in Pearl Harbor, but it is an epic, and Pearl Harbor is not." Ed Gonzalez of Slant Magazine gave the film one out of four stars and wrote, "Middlingly racist, humorless, and downright inept, Pearl Harbor is solely for fans of fireworks factories."

A. O. Scott of The New York Times wrote, "Nearly every line of the script drops from the actors' mouths with the leaden clank of exposition, timed with bad sitcom beats." Mike Clark of USA Today gave the film two out of four stars and wrote, "Ships, planes and water combust and collide in Pearl Harbor, but nothing else does in one of the wimpiest wartime romances ever filmed."

In his review for The Washington Post, Desson Howe wrote, "although this Walt Disney movie is based, inspired and even partially informed by a real event referred to as Pearl Harbor, the movie is actually based on the movies Top Gun, Titanic and Saving Private Ryan. Don't get confused." Peter Travers of Rolling Stone magazine wrote, "Affleck, Hartnett and Beckinsale – a British actress without a single worthy line to wrap her credible American accent around – are attractive actors, but they can't animate this moldy romantic triangle." Time magazine's Richard Schickel criticized the love triangle: "It requires a lot of patience for an audience to sit through the dithering. They're nice kids and all that, but they don't exactly claw madly at one another. It's as if they know that someday they're going to be part of "the Greatest Generation" and don't want to offend Tom Brokaw. Besides, megahistory and personal history never integrate here." Robert W. Butler of The Kansas City Star wrote, "The dialogue is so unrelentingly banal as to make one reconsider whether James Cameron's writing on Titanic was really all that bad."

Entertainment Weekly was more positive, giving the film a "B−" rating, and Owen Gleiberman praised the Pearl Harbor attack sequence: "Bay's staging is spectacular but also honorable in its scary, hurtling exactitude. ... There are startling point-of-view shots of torpedoes dropping into the water and speeding toward their targets, and though Bay visualizes it all with a minimum of graphic carnage, he invites us to register the terror of the men standing helplessly on deck, the horrifying split-second deliverance as bodies go flying and explosions reduce entire battleships to liquid walls of collapsing metal."

In his review for The New York Observer, Andrew Sarris wrote, "here is the ironic twist in my acceptance of Pearl Harbor – the parts I liked most are the parts before and after the digital destruction of Pearl Harbor by the Japanese carrier planes" and felt that "Pearl Harbor is not so much about World War II as it is about movies about World War II. And what's wrong with that?"

Critics in Japan received the film more positively than in most countries with one likening it to Gone with the Wind set during World War II and another describing it as more realistic than Tora! Tora! Tora!

In 2023, Rolling Stone cited Bay's direction of Pearl Harbor as one of the fifty worst decisions in film history. Andy Greene described it as a less successful attempt to replicate the success of Titanic and Bay's previous film, Armageddon.

=== Accolades ===
The film was nominated for four Academy Awards, winning in the category of Best Sound Editing. It was also nominated for six Golden Raspberry Awards, including Worst Picture. This marked the first occurrence of a Worst Picture-nominated film winning an Academy Award; it is also the only film directed by Bay to win an Academy Award.

Award	Category	Recipient	Result	Ref.
Academy Awards	Best Original Song	"There You'll Be"; Music and Lyrics by Diane Warren	Nominated	
Academy Awards	Best Sound	Kevin O'Connell, Greg P. Russell, and Peter J. Devlin	Nominated	
Academy Awards	Best Sound Editing	George Watters II and Christopher Boyes	Won	
Academy Awards	Best Visual Effects	Eric Brevig, John Frazier, Ed Hirsh, and Ben Snow	Nominated	
American Society of Cinematographers Awards	Outstanding Achievement in Cinematography in Theatrical Releases	John Schwartzman	Nominated	
ASCAP Film and Television Music Awards	Top Box Office Films	Hans Zimmer	Won	
ASCAP Film and Television Music Awards	Most Performed Songs from Motion Pictures	"There You'll Be"; Music and Lyrics by Diane Warren	Won	
Awards Circuit Community Awards	Best Original Score	Hans Zimmer	Nominated	
Awards Circuit Community Awards	Best Visual Effects		Nominated	
Bogey Awards			Nominated	
Critics' Choice Awards	Best Song	"There You'll Be"; Music and Lyrics by Diane Warren	Nominated	
Cinema Audio Society Awards	Outstanding Achievement in Sound Mixing for Motion Pictures	Kevin O'Connell, Greg P. Russell, and Peter J. Devlin	Nominated	
DVD Exclusive Awards	Best Overall New Extra Features, New Release	Michael Bay, Mark Palansky, David Prior, and Eric Young	Nominated	
DVD Exclusive Awards	Best New, Enhanced or Reconstructed Movie Scenes	Michael Bay	Nominated	
DVD Exclusive Awards	Original Retrospective Documentary, New Release	Doug McCallie	Nominated	
DVD Exclusive Awards	Best Menu Design	David Prior	Nominated	
Golden Globe Awards	Best Original Score – Motion Picture	Hans Zimmer	Nominated	
Golden Globe Awards	Best Original Song – Motion Picture	"There You'll Be"; Music and Lyrics by Diane Warren	Nominated	
Golden Raspberry Awards (2001)	Worst Picture		Nominated	
Golden Raspberry Awards (2001)	Worst Director	Michael Bay	Nominated	
Golden Raspberry Awards (2001)	Worst Actor	Ben Affleck	Nominated	
Golden Raspberry Awards (2001)	Worst Screenplay	Randall Wallace	Nominated	
Golden Raspberry Awards (2001)	Worst Screen Couple	Ben Affleck and either Kate Beckinsale or Josh Hartnett	Nominated	
Golden Raspberry Awards (2001)	Worst Remake or Sequel		Nominated	
Golden Raspberry Awards (2009)	Worst Actor of the Decade	Ben Affleck (also for Daredevil, Gigli, Jersey Girl, Paycheck, and Surviving Christmas)	Nominated	
Golden Reel Awards	Best Sound Editing – Dialogue & ADR, Domestic Feature Film	George Watters II, Christopher T. Welch, Teri E. Dorman, Julie Feiner, Cindy Marty, Michelle Pazer, David A. Arnold, Marshall Winn, Ulrika Akander, and Allen Hartz	Nominated	
Golden Reel Awards	Best Sound Editing – Sound Effects & Foley, Domestic Feature Film	Christopher Boyes, George Watters II, Victoria Martin, Ethan Van der Ryn, Beau Borders, Scott Guitteau, Suhail Kafity, Adam Kopald, F. Hudson Miller, R.J. Palmer, Christopher Scarabosio, Robert L. Sephton, Matthew Harrison, James Likowski, and Gary Wright	Nominated	
Golden Rooster Awards	Best Translated Film		Won	
Golden Schmoes Awards	Worst Movie of the Year		Nominated	
Golden Schmoes Awards	Best Special Effects of the Year		Nominated	
Golden Schmoes Awards	Biggest Disappointment of the Year		Nominated	
Golden Schmoes Awards	Best Trailer of the Year		Nominated	
Golden Schmoes Awards	Best Action Sequence of the Year	"Attack on Pearl Harbor"	Nominated	
Golden Schmoes Awards	Most Memorable Scene in a Movie	"Attack on Pearl Harbor"	Nominated	
Golden Screen Awards			Won	
Golden Trailer Awards	Best Action		Nominated	
GoldSpirit Awards	Best Soundtrack	Hans Zimmer	Nominated	
GoldSpirit Awards	Best Drama Soundtrack	Hans Zimmer	Won	
Grammy Awards	Best Song Written for a Motion Picture, Television or Other Visual Media	"There You'll Be" – Diane Warren	Nominated	
Harry Awards			Nominated	
Huabiao Awards	Outstanding Translated Foreign Film		Won	
MTV Asia Awards	Favorite Movie		Nominated	
MTV Movie Awards	Best Male Performance	Josh Hartnett	Nominated	
MTV Movie Awards	Best Female Performance	Kate Beckinsale	Nominated	
MTV Movie Awards	Best Action Sequence	"The Attack Scene"	Won	
Online Film & Television Association Awards	Best Original Song	"There You'll Be"; Music and Lyrics by Diane Warren	Nominated	
Online Film & Television Association Awards	Best Sound		Nominated	
Online Film & Television Association Awards	Best Sound Editing		Nominated	
Online Film & Television Association Awards	Best Visual Effects		Nominated	
Phoenix Film Critics Society Awards	Best Visual Effects	Eric Brevig, John Frazier, Ed Hirsh, and Ben Snow	Nominated	
Satellite Awards	Best Cinematography	John Schwartzman	Nominated	
Satellite Awards	Best Original Song	"There You'll Be"; Music and Lyrics by Diane Warren	Nominated	
Satellite Awards	Best Visual Effects	Eric Brevig	Nominated	
Stinkers Bad Movie Awards	Worst Picture		Nominated	
Stinkers Bad Movie Awards	Worst Sense of Direction	Michael Bay	Nominated	
Stinkers Bad Movie Awards	Worst Screenplay for a Film Grossing More Than $100M Worldwide Using Hollywood Math	Randall Wallace	Won	
Teen Choice Awards	Choice Movie – Drama/Action Adventure		Won	
Teen Choice Awards	Choice Movie Actor	Ben Affleck	Won	
Teen Choice Awards	Choice Movie Actor	Josh Hartnett	Nominated	
Teen Choice Awards	Choice Movie Chemistry	Ben Affleck and Kate Beckinsale	Nominated	
World Soundtrack Awards	Soundtrack Composer of the Year	Hans Zimmer (also for An Everlasting Piece, Hannibal, and The Pledge)	Nominated	
World Stunt Awards	Best Aerial Work	Gene Armstrong, Will Bonafas, James Gavin, John Hinton, Steve Hinton, Gary Hudson, Kevin La Rosa, John Maloney, Bill Powers, Alan Preston, Allan Purwyn, James Ryan, and John Storrie	Nominated	
World Stunt Awards	Best Stunt Coordination – Feature Film	Kenny Bates	Nominated	
World Stunt Awards	Best Stunt Coordination – Sequence	Kenny Bates, Andy Gill, and Steve Picerni	Won	
Yoga Awards	Worst Foreign Actor	Ben Affleck	Won	

== Historical accuracy ==
Like many historical dramas, Pearl Harbor provoked debate about the artistic license taken by its producers and director. National Geographic Channel produced a documentary called Beyond the Movie: Pearl Harbor detailing some of the ways that "the film's final cut didn't reflect all the attacks' facts, or represent them all accurately". The film was ranked number three on Careeraftermilitary.com's "10 Most Inaccurate Military Movies Ever Made," which also included The Patriot, The Hurt Locker, U-571, The Green Berets, Windtalkers, Battle of the Bulge, Red Tails, Enemy at the Gates and Flyboys on its list of falsified war movie productions.

Many Pearl Harbor survivors dismissed the film as grossly inaccurate and pure Hollywood. In an interview done by Frank Wetta, producer Jerry Bruckheimer was quoted saying: "We tried to be accurate, but it's certainly not meant to be a history lesson." Historian Lawrence Suid's review is particularly detailed as to the major factual misrepresentations of the film and the negative impact they have even on an entertainment film, as he notes that "the very name of the film implies that audiences will be witnessing a historic event, accurately rendered."

The Battle of Britain had already ended in October 1940 whereas the film has it still happening in early 1941 with dogfights over the English Channel.

Critics decried the use of fictional replacements for real people, declaring that Pearl Harbor was an "abuse of artistic license." The roles the two male leads have in the attack sequence are analogous to the real historical deeds of United States Army Air Forces Second Lieutenants George Welch and Kenneth M. Taylor, who took to the skies in P-40 Warhawk aircraft during the Japanese attack and, together, claimed six Japanese aircraft and a few probables. Taylor called the film "a piece of trash... over-sensationalized and distorted."

The scene following the attack on Pearl Harbor, where President Roosevelt demands an immediate retaliatory strike on the soil of Japan, did not happen as portrayed in the film. Admiral Chester Nimitz and General George Marshall are seen denying the possibility of an aerial attack on Japan, but in real life they actually advocated such a strike. Another inconsistency in this scene is when President Roosevelt (who at this time in his life, used wheelchair due to his disease, Guillain–Barré syndrome or Polio) is able to stand up to challenge his staff's distrust in a strike on Japan, which never really happened.

The portrayal of the planning of the Doolittle Raid, the air raid itself, and the raid's aftermath, is considered one of the most historically inaccurate portions of the film. In the film, Jimmy Doolittle and the rest of the Doolittle raiders had to launch from USS Hornet 624 miles off the Japanese coast and after being spotted by a few Japanese patrol boats. In actuality, the Doolittle raiders had to launch 650 miles off the Japanese coast and after being spotted by only one Japanese patrol boat. The film shows all the bombers arriving in formation over Japan, omitting the fact that at least one bomber jettisoned its bombs over the ocean due to mechanical problems and thus did not participate in the raid. It actually took one hour to launch the 16 planes, each setting out on its own course, and at no time did the planes fly together. In the film, all sixteen raiders are depicted as converging on Tokyo and obliterating an entire industrial area. In reality, the bombers attacked in isolated groups of no more than three apiece, and their targets were spread out across the Tokyo metropolitan area along with three other cities - Nagoya, Osaka, and Kobe. Prior to the raid, a chalkboard containing plans for the raid does accurately reflect other destination cities, but this is mostly obscured from view and never discussed in the dialogue. The firefight with Japanese soldiers after the raiders crash-land in China is entirely fictionalized, whereas the actual smuggling of the pilots back to the United States was omitted.

== Soundtrack ==
The soundtrack to Pearl Harbor on Hollywood Records was nominated for the Golden Globe Award for Best Original Score (Moulin Rouge! won). The original score was composed by Hans Zimmer. The song "There You'll Be" was nominated for the Academy Award and Golden Globe Award for Best Original Song.

== See also ==
- Sangam, an earlier 1964 Indian film with a strikingly similar storyline, but with only one friend being a pilot in Sangam, whereas both are pilots in Pearl Harbor.
- Tora! Tora! Tora!, 1970 film about the Pearl Harbor attack.
- The Chinese Widow, 2017 film about the story described in later half of movie Pearl Harbor in another viewpoint.
- Midway, 2019 film

== Bibliography ==
- Arroyo, Ernest. Pearl Harbor. New York: MetroBooks, 2001. ISBN 1-58663-285-X.
- Barker, A.J. Pearl Harbor (Ballantine's Illustrated History of World War II, Battle Book, No. 10). New York: Ballantine Books, 1969. No ISBN.
- Cohen, Stan. East Wind Rain: A Pictorial History of the Pearl Harbor Attack. Missoula, Montana: Pictorial Histories Publishing Company, 1981. ISBN 0-933126-15-8.
- Craig, John S. (2004). Peculiar Liaisons: In War, Espionage, and Terrorism in the Twentieth Century. New York: Algora Publishing. ISBN 978-0-87586-331-3.
- Golstein, Donald M., Katherine Dillon and J. Michael Wenger. The Way it Was: Pearl Harbor (The Original Photographs). Dulles, Virginia: Brassey's Inc., 1995. ISBN 1-57488-359-3.
- Kimmel, Husband E. Kimmel's Story. Washington, D.C.: Henry Regnery Co., 1955.
- Prange, Gordon W. At Dawn we Slept: The Untold Story of Pearl Harbor. Harmondsworth, Middlesex, UK: Penguin Books, 1981. ISBN 0-14-006455-9.
- Sheehan, Ed. Days of '41: Pearl Harbor Remembered. Honolulu: Kapa Associates, 1977. ISBN 0-915870-01-0.
- Sunshine, Linda and Antonia Felix, eds. Pearl Harbor: The Movie and the Moment. New York: Hyperion, 2001. ISBN 0-7868-6780-9.
- Sullivan, Robert. "What Really Happened." Time, June 4, 2001.
- Thorpe. Brigadier General Elliott R. East Wind Rain: The Intimate Account of an Intelligence Officer in the Pacific, 1939–49. Boston: Gambit Incorporated, 1969. No ISBN.
- Wilmott, H.P. with Tohmatsu Haruo and W. Spencer Johnson. Pearl Harbor. London: Cassell & Co., 2001. ISBN 978-0304358847.
- Winchester, Jim, ed. Aircraft of World War II (The Aviation Factfile). London: Grange Books, 2004. ISBN 1-84013-639-1.
- Wisiniewski, Richard A., ed. Pearl Harbor and the USS Arizona Memorial: A Pictorial History. Honolulu: Pacific Basin Enterprises, 1981, first edition 1977. No ISBN.
