= John Nelson (visual effects artist) =

American visual effects supervisor (born 1953)

John Nelson (born July 21, 1953) is an American visual effects supervisor. He has won two Academy Awards for Best Visual Effects for his work on the film Gladiator (2000) and Blade Runner 2049 (2017). He has also been nominated for I, Robot (2004) and Iron Man (2008).

In 2018 he also won the Academy the British Academy of Film and Television Arts (BAFTA)for the Special Visual Effects for Blade Runner 2049.

== Education and career ==
After graduating with high distinction from the University of Michigan in 1976, he worked as a cameraman, technical director, and a director at the pioneering computer animation and commercial production company Robert Abel and Associates, where he won two Clio awards and earned six additional Clio nominations. Early in his career while at ILM, Nelson modeled, animated, lit and composited several shots for Terminator 2: Judgment Day (1991), including the iconic scene in which the shotgunned head of the chrome terminator splits open and reseals. After Industrial Light and Magic, Mr. Nelson worked for Rhythm & Hues and Sony Imageworks before winning his first Academy Award for the Visual Effects in "Gladiator". After nominations for "Iron Man" and "I Robot", Mr. Nelson won his second Academy Award for the Visual Effects in "Blade Runner 2049" He is a member of the Academy of Motion Picture Arts and Sciences, the Visual Effects Society, the International Cinematographers Guild and the Directors Guild of America.
