= Iron Man (2008 film) =

Marvel Studios film

- Theatrical release poster
- Directed by: Jon Favreau
- Screenplay by: Mark Fergus; Hawk Ostby; Art Marcum; Matt Holloway
- Based on: Iron Man by: Stan Lee; Don Heck; Larry Lieber; Jack Kirby
- Produced by: Avi Arad; Kevin Feige
- Starring: Robert Downey Jr.; Terrence Howard; Jeff Bridges; Gwyneth Paltrow; Leslie Bibb; Shaun Toub
- Cinematography: Matthew Libatique
- Edited by: Dan Lebental
- Music by: Ramin Djawadi
- Production company: Marvel Studios
- Distributed by: Paramount Pictures (Note: In July 2013, the film's distribution rights were transferred from Paramount Pictures to Walt Disney Studios Motion Pictures following Disney's acquisition of Marvel Entertainment.)
- Release dates: April 14, 2008 (Sydney); May 2, 2008 (United States)
- Running time: 126 minutes
- Country: United States
- Language: English
- Budget: $150 million
- Box office: $585.8 million

Iron Man is a 2008 American superhero film based on the Marvel Comics character Iron Man. Produced by Marvel Studios and distributed by Paramount Pictures, it is the first film in the Marvel Cinematic Universe (MCU). Directed by Jon Favreau and written by the teams of Mark Fergus & Hawk Ostby and Art Marcum & Matt Holloway, the film stars Robert Downey Jr. as Tony Stark / Iron Man alongside Terrence Howard, Jeff Bridges, Gwyneth Paltrow, Leslie Bibb, and Shaun Toub. In the film, world-famous industrialist and master engineer Stark builds a mechanized suit of armor to escape from captivity by a terrorist group, and then uses the suit to become the superhero Iron Man.

A film featuring Iron Man was in development at Universal Pictures, 20th Century Fox, and New Line Cinema at various times since 1990 before Marvel Studios reacquired the rights in 2005. Marvel put the project in production as its first self-financed film, with Paramount Pictures distributing. Favreau signed on as director in April 2006 and faced opposition from Marvel when trying to cast Downey in the title role; the actor was signed in September. Filming took place from March to June 2007, primarily in California to differentiate the film from numerous other superhero stories that are set in New York City. During filming, the actors were free to create their own dialogue because pre-production was focused on the story and action. Rubber and metal versions of the armor, created by Stan Winston's company, were mixed with computer-generated imagery to create the title character.

Iron Man premiered in Sydney, Australia, on April 14, 2008, and was released in the United States on May 2 as the first film in Phase One of the MCU. It was a commercial success, grossing over $585 million and becoming the eighth-highest grossing film of 2008. It also received positive reviews from critics, who praised Downey's performance and Favreau's balance of character development and special effects. Iron Man was nominated for Best Sound Editing and Best Visual Effects at the 81st Academy Awards, among numerous other accolades, and was named one of the ten best films of the year by the American Film Institute. In 2022, the Library of Congress selected the film for preservation in the United States National Film Registry for being "culturally, historically, or aesthetically significant". Two sequels have been released: Iron Man 2 (2010) and Iron Man 3 (2013).

== Plot ==
Tony Stark, who has inherited the defense contractor Stark Industries from his late father Howard Stark, tours in war-torn Afghanistan with his best friend and military liaison, James "Rhodey" Rhodes, to demonstrate the new "Jericho" missile. After the demonstration, his convoy is ambushed by a terrorist group, the Ten Rings, and Stark is gravely wounded by a missile used by the attackers—one of his company's own. He is captured and imprisoned in a cave by the Ten Rings. Yinsen, a fellow captive and doctor, implants an electromagnet into Stark's chest to keep the shrapnel shards that wounded him from reaching his heart and killing him. Ten Rings leader Raza offers Stark freedom in exchange for building a Jericho missile for the group, but he and Yinsen believe that Raza will not keep his word.

Stark and Yinsen secretly build a small, powerful electric generator called an arc reactor to power Stark's electromagnet and construct a prototype armored suit to aid in their escape. Although they keep the suit hidden, the Ten Rings discover their intentions and attack the workshop. Yinsen sacrifices himself to divert them while the suit powers up. The armored Stark battles his way out of the cave to find the dying Yinsen, then burns the Ten Rings' weapons and flies away, crashing in the desert and destroying the suit. After being rescued by Rhodes, Stark returns home and announces that his company will cease manufacturing weapons. Obadiah Stane, his father's old partner and the company's manager, advises Stark that this will bankrupt Stark Industries and ruin his father's legacy. In his home workshop, Stark builds a sleeker, more powerful version of his improvised armor suit as well as a more powerful arc reactor for it and his chest after testing a prototype. Personal assistant Pepper Potts places the original reactor inside a small glass showcase. Though Stane requests details, a suspicious Stark decides to keep his work to himself.

At a charity event, reporter Christine Everhart informs Stark that his company's weapons were recently delivered to the Ten Rings and are being used to attack Yinsen's home village. Stark dons his new armor and flies to Afghanistan, where he fends off the terrorists and saves the villagers. While flying home, Stark is intercepted by the Air Force and reveals his secret identity to Rhodes over the phone to end the attack. Meanwhile, the Ten Rings gather the pieces of Stark's prototype suit and meet with Stane, who has been trafficking arms to the Ten Rings and has staged a coup to replace Stark as Stark Industries' CEO by hiring the Ten Rings to kill him. He subdues Raza, has his group killed, and reverse-engineers a massive new armor suit from the wreckage. Seeking to track his company's illegal shipments, Stark sends Potts to hack into its database. She discovers that Stane hired the Ten Rings to kill Stark, but the group altered their plans when they realized they had a direct route to Stark's weapons. Potts meets with Agent Phil Coulson of S.H.I.E.L.D., an intelligence agency, to inform him of Stane's activities.

Stane's scientists are unable to replicate Stark's miniaturized arc reactor, so Stane enters Stark's home, stuns Stark, and steals the one from his chest. Stark manages to replace it with his original reactor. Potts and several S.H.I.E.L.D. agents attempt to arrest Stane, but he dons his suit and overpowers them. Stark fights Stane but is outmatched without his new reactor to run his suit at full capacity. The fight carries Stark and Stane to the top of the Stark Industries building, where Stark instructs Potts to overload the large arc reactor powering the building. This unleashes a massive electrical surge that causes Stane to fall into the reactor, and he is killed in the explosion. The next day, at a press conference, Stark publicly admits to being the superhero the press has dubbed "Iron Man".

In a post-credits scene, S.H.I.E.L.D. director Nick Fury visits Stark at his home, telling him that he has become part of a "bigger universe", and that he wants to discuss the "Avenger Initiative".

== Cast ==
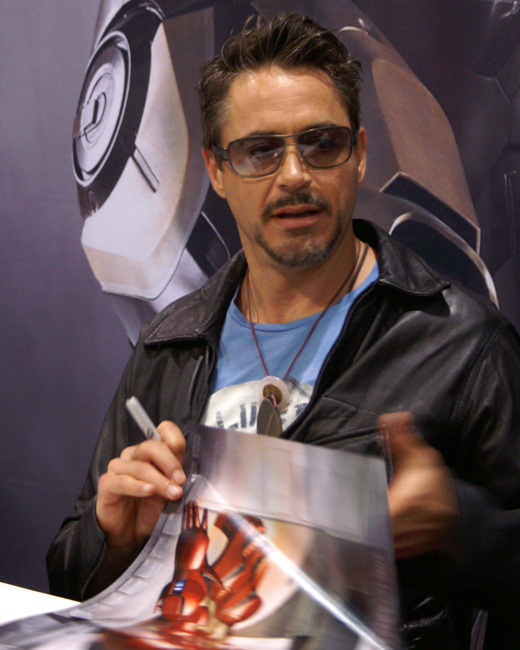
Downey promoting the film at the 2007 San Diego Comic-Con

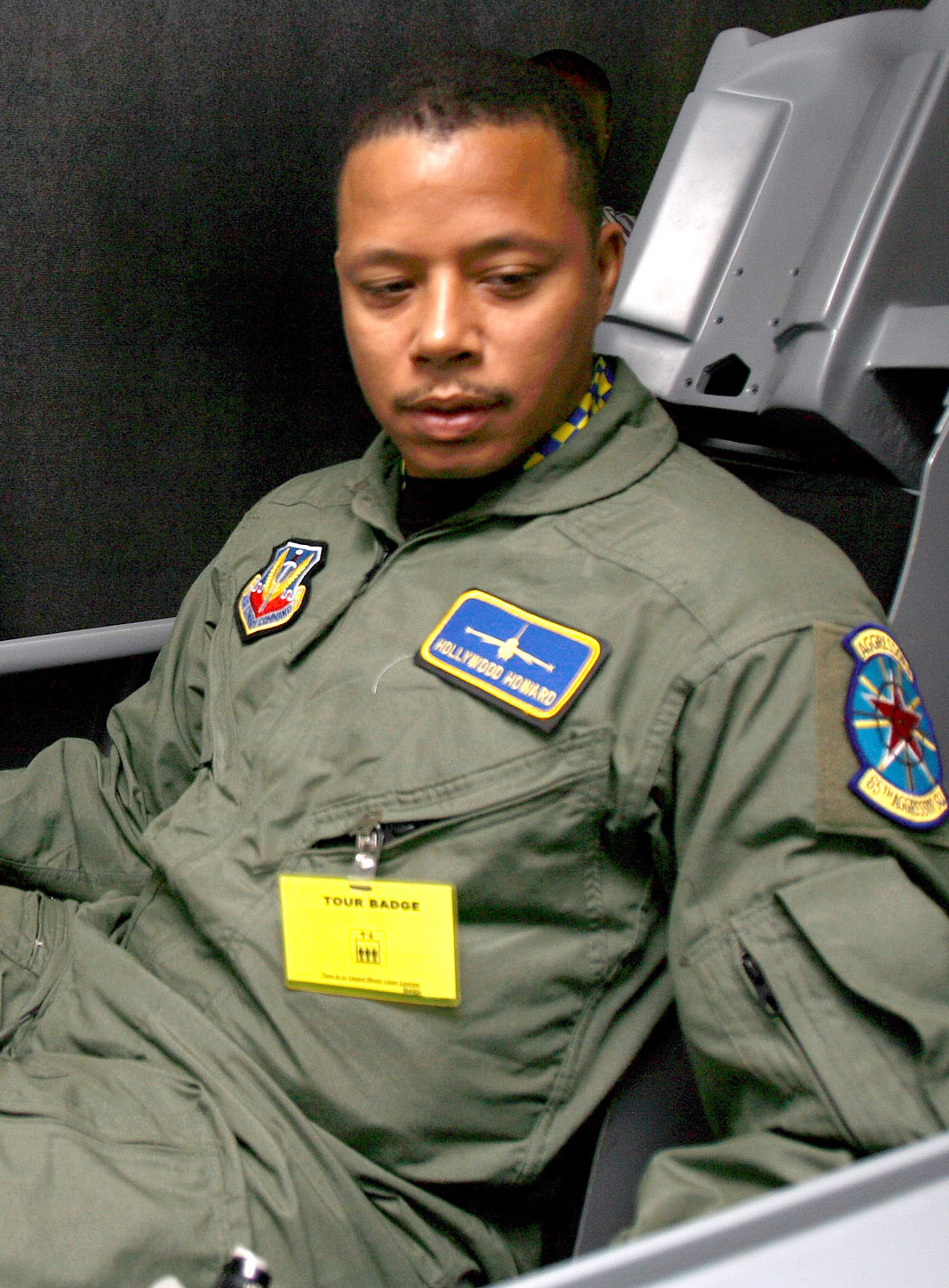
Howard preparing for the role by riding an F-16 flight simulator

- Robert Downey Jr. as Tony Stark / Iron Man:
  An industrialist, genius inventor, and playboy, he is CEO of Stark Industries and chief weapons manufacturer for the U.S. military. Director Jon Favreau felt that Downey's past made him an appropriate choice for the part and that the actor could not only make Stark a "likable asshole," but also portray an authentic emotional journey, once he had won over the audience. Favreau was also attracted to Downey because of his performance in Kiss Kiss Bang Bang (2005). Downey frequently spoke with that film's director, Shane Black, about the script and dialogue in Iron Man. Downey had an office next to Favreau during pre-production, which allowed him greater involvement in the screenwriting process, especially when it came to adding humor to the film. Downey explained, "What I usually hate about these [superhero] movies [is] when suddenly the guy that you were digging turns into Dudley Do-Right, and then you're supposed to buy into all his 'Let's go do some good!' That Eliot Ness-in-a-cape-type thing. What was really important to me was to not have him change so much that he's unrecognizable. When someone used to be a schmuck and they're not anymore, hopefully they still have a sense of humor." To get into shape, Downey spent five days a week weight training and practiced martial arts, which he said benefited him because "it's hard not to have a personality meltdown ... after about several hours in that suit. I'm calling up every therapeutic moment I can think of to just get through the day."
- Terrence Howard as James "Rhodey" Rhodes:
  A friend of Stark's and the liaison between Stark Industries and the United States Air Force in the department of acquisitions, specifically weapons development. Favreau cast Howard because he felt he could play War Machine in a sequel. Howard prepared for the role by visiting Nellis Air Force Base on March 16, 2007, where he ate with the pilots and observed HH-60 Pave Hawk rescue helicopters and F-22 Raptors. While Rhodes is roguish in the comics after he meets Stark, his previous role as a disciplinarian creates a dynamic tension with Stark's character. He is unsure whether Stark's actions are acceptable. "Rhodey is completely disgusted with the way Tony has lived his life, but at a certain point he realizes that perhaps there is a different way," Howard said. "Whose life is the right way: Is it the strict military life, or the life of an independent?" Howard and his father are Iron Man fans, partly because Rhodes was one of the few black superheroes when Howard was a child. Howard admired Downey as an actor since the latter appeared in Weird Science (1985); the two competed physically on set. Howard signed a three-picture deal with Marvel Studios.
- Jeff Bridges as Obadiah Stane:
  Stark's business second-in-command, mentor, and friend, who turns on him to take over the company, eventually building a giant exosuit to fight Stark. Bridges read the comics as a boy and liked Favreau's modern, realistic approach. He shaved his head, something he had wanted to do for some time, and grew a beard for the role. Bridges researched the Book of Obadiah, and was surprised to learn retribution is a major theme in that book of the Bible, something that Stane represents. Many of Stane's scenes were cut to focus more on Stark, but the writers felt Bridges's performance allowed the application of "less is more" when editing the film.
- Gwyneth Paltrow as Virginia "Pepper" Potts:
  Stark's personal assistant and budding love interest. Paltrow asked Marvel to send her any comics they would consider relevant to her understanding of the character, whom she considered to be very smart, level-headed, and grounded. She said she liked "the fact that there's a sexuality that's not blatant." Favreau wanted Potts' and Stark's relationship to be reminiscent of a 1940s comedy, something which Paltrow considered to be fun in an "innocent yet sexy" way.
- Leslie Bibb as Christine Everhart: A reporter for Vanity Fair.
- Shaun Toub as Ho Yinsen: Stark's fellow captive, who grafts an electromagnet to Stark's chest "to keep the shrapnel shell shards that wounded him from reaching his heart and killing him" and helps Stark build the first Iron Man suit.

Additionally, Faran Tahir appears as Raza, the leader of the Ten Rings; Paul Bettany voices J.A.R.V.I.S., Stark's personal AI system; and Clark Gregg appears as Phil Coulson, an agent of S.H.I.E.L.D. Will Lyman provides the voice-over during the opening award ceremony. Director Jon Favreau plays Harold "Happy" Hogan, Stark's bodyguard and chauffeur, and Samuel L. Jackson makes an uncredited cameo appearance as Nick Fury, director of S.H.I.E.L.D., in a post-credits scene. Jackson's face was previously used as the model for the Ultimate Marvel imprint version of Nick Fury. Other cameos in the film include Stan Lee as himself, being mistaken for Hugh Hefner by Stark at a party; Peter Billingsley as William Ginter Riva, a scientist who works for Stane; Tom Morello, who provided guitar music for the film, as a terrorist guard; and Jim Cramer as himself. Ghostface Killah, who often adopted Iron Man's name as an alias, had a cameo in a scene where Stark stays in Dubai, but the scene was cut for pacing reasons.

== Production ==
=== Development ===
In April 1990, Universal Pictures bought the rights to develop Iron Man for the big screen, with Stuart Gordon to direct a low-budget film based on the property. By February 1996, 20th Century Fox had acquired the rights from Universal. In January 1997, Nicolas Cage expressed interest in portraying the character, while in September 1998, Tom Cruise expressed interest in producing as well as starring in an Iron Man film. Cruise later declined the role as he was not comfortable on taking it. Jeff Vintar and Iron Man co-creator Stan Lee co-wrote a story for Fox, which Vintar adapted into a screenplay for Cage. It included a new science-fiction origin for the character, and featured MODOK as the villain. Tom Rothman, President of Production at Fox, credited the screenplay with finally making him understand the character. In May 1999, Jeffrey Caine was hired to rewrite Vintar and Lee's script. That October, Quentin Tarantino was approached to write and direct the film. Fox sold the rights to New Line Cinema the following December, reasoning that although the Vintar/Lee script was strong, the studio had too many Marvel superheroes in development, and "we can't make them all."

We worked with Michael Crichton's researchers to find a grounded realistic way to deal with the suit. The idea was he needed the suit to stay alive. He's the same guy we used with Spider-Man 2 to come up with Doc Ock's inhibitor chips and what the arms are made of and how they work. ... Mandarin was an Indonesian terrorist who masqueraded as a rich playboy who Tony knew.

— Alfred Gough on his draft for Nick Cassavetes' and New Line's aborted version

By July 2000, the film was being written for New Line Cinema by Ted Elliott, Terry Rossio, and Tim McCanlies. McCanlies' script used the idea of a Nick Fury cameo to set up his own film. In June 2001, New Line Cinema entered talks with Joss Whedon, a fan of the character, to direct, and in December 2002, McCanlies had turned in a completed script. New Line took a "unique" approach to writing the film's script, hiring David Hayter, David S. Goyer, and Mark Protosevich to "sit in a room and simply talk on camera about Iron Man for a few days". After this, Hayter was hired in 2004 to write a script. He reworked scripts that had been written by Jeff Vintar and Alfred Gough and Miles Millar, which had included the villain the Mandarin and Pepper Potts as a love interest. Hayter removed the Mandarin and instead chose to pit Iron Man against his father Howard Stark, who becomes War Machine. Hayter said "you want to try to mirror your hero with your villain as much as possible" for his reasoning behind making Howard the villain. He also made Bethany Cabe the film's love interest over Potts. In December 2004, the studio attached director Nick Cassavetes to the project for a target 2006 release. However, this deal ultimately fell through, and the Iron Man film rights returned to Marvel.

In November 2005, Marvel Studios worked to start development from scratch, and announced Iron Man as their first independent feature, because the character was their only major one not already depicted in live action. Paramount Pictures was announced as Marvel's distribution partner for Iron Man. According to associate producer Jeremy Latcham, "we went after about 30 writers and they all passed," saying they were uninterested in the project due to both the relative obscurity of the character and the fact that it was solely a Marvel production. When the film did have a script, even the requests for rewrites were met with many refusals. Early scripts for the film also directly referenced Sony Pictures' Spider-Man 2 (2004) by identifying Stark as the creator of Otto Octavius's bionic arms. In order to build the general public's awareness of Iron Man and elevate him to the same level of popularity as Spider-Man or Hulk, Marvel conducted focus groups, trying to find a way to remove the general perception that the character is a robot. The information Marvel received from the focus groups was used to formulate an awareness-building plan, which included releasing three animated short films ahead of the film's release. The shorts were called "Iron Man Advertorials", and were produced by Tim Miller and Blur Studio.

=== Pre-production ===
Jon Favreau was hired to direct the film in April 2006, and he celebrated getting the job by going on a diet, resulting in him losing 70 pounds (32 kg). Favreau had wanted to work with Marvel producer Avi Arad on another film after they both worked on Daredevil (2003). The director found the opportunity to create a politically ambitious "ultimate spy movie" in Iron Man, citing inspiration from Tom Clancy, James Bond, and RoboCop (1987), and compared his approach to an independent film—"[i]f Robert Altman had directed Superman"—and Batman Begins (2005). Favreau wanted to make Iron Man a story of an adult man literally reinventing himself after discovering the world is far more complex than he originally believed. He changed the Vietnam War origin of the character to Afghanistan, as he did not want to make a period piece. Art Marcum and Matt Holloway were hired to write the script, while Mark Fergus and Hawk Ostby wrote another version, with Favreau compiling both teams' scripts, and John August then "polishing" the combined version. Comic book staff Mark Millar, Brian Michael Bendis, Joe Quesada, Tom Brevoort, Axel Alonso, and Ralph Macchio were also called upon by Favreau to give advice on the script. In May 2006, Arad left Marvel Studios to become an independent producer. Because he was on staff when the deal was made for Iron Man, he retained producer credit on the film. By July 2006, Matthew Libatique was attached to serve as cinematographer.

Favreau planned to cast a newcomer in the title role, as "those movies don't require an expensive star; Iron Man's the star, the superhero is the star. The success of X-Men and Spider-Man without being star-driven pieces reassures [executives] that the film does have an upside commercially." Those considered for the role included Jim Caviezel, Timothy Olyphant, and Sam Rockwell. Rockwell was approached and was interested, but did not get the role; Rockwell later portrayed Justin Hammer in Iron Man 2 (2010). Feige said Clive Owen was the studio's top choice for Stark and he was offered the part, but was not interested. Favreau met with Robert Downey Jr. and became convinced that he was the right actor for the role. Favreau chose Downey, a fan of the comic, because he felt the actor's past made him an appropriate choice for the part, explaining: "The best and worst moments of Robert's life have been in the public eye. He had to find an inner balance to overcome obstacles that went far beyond his career. That's Tony Stark." Favreau faced opposition from Marvel Entertainment executives in casting Downey, but would not take no for an answer, saying: "It was my job as a director to show that it was the best choice creatively ... everybody knew he was talented [and] certainly by studying the Iron Man role and developing that script I realized that the character seemed to line-up with Robert in all the good and bad ways." Casting director Sarah Halley Finn suggested Downey create an audition tape to help persuade them. The executives were still not convinced, despite Favreau and Feige recommending Downey for the role, which resulted in Favreau leaking to the press that Downey was in talks; the positive reaction and enthusiasm to this story helped convince the executives, and Downey was cast in September 2006. Downey earned $500,000 for the role. While preparing for filming, Favreau and Downey were given a tour of SpaceX by Elon Musk. Downey said, "Elon was someone Tony probably hung out with and partied with, or more likely they went on some weird jungle trek together to drink concoctions with the shamans."

Additional casting for the film occurred over the next few months: Terrence Howard was announced in the role of Stark's best friend James "Rhodey" Rhodes in October 2006. He had been the first actor cast for the film. Don Cheadle had also been approached for the role of Rhodes, and would eventually replace Howard in the role starting with the sequel, Iron Man 2. Rachel McAdams was offered the role of Virginia "Pepper" Potts, but turned it down to focus on her family. Gwyneth Paltrow was cast in the role instead in January 2007; and Jeff Bridges was cast in an undisclosed role in February. Choosing a character to be the main villain of the film was difficult, as Favreau felt Iron Man's arch-nemesis the Mandarin would not feel realistic, especially after Mark Millar gave his opinion on the script. The Mandarin had originally been envisioned as a rival to Tony Stark with a building of his own right next to Stark Industries, with the Mandarin eventually drilling a hole underneath Stark Industries to steal all of Stark's technology for himself; associate producer Jeremy Latcham described such story as "crazy terrible" and "underwhelming". Favreau felt only in a sequel, with an altered tone, would the fantasy of the Mandarin's rings be appropriate. The decision to push him into the background was compared to Sauron in The Lord of the Rings, or Palpatine in Star Wars. Favreau also wanted Iron Man to face a giant enemy. The switch from Mandarin to Obadiah Stane was done after Bridges was cast in that role, with Stane originally intended to become a villain in the sequel; a version of the script intended to show Stane had escaped his damaged suit. The Crimson Dynamo was also a villain in early drafts of the script, including at one point combining the character with the Mandarin. Favreau felt it was important to include Easter egg references for fans of the comics, such as giving the two fighter jets that attack Iron Man the call signs of "Whiplash 1" and "Whiplash 2", a reference to the comic book villain Whiplash, and including Captain America's shield in Stark's workshop.

The scale model of the Iron Monger suit as seen in the film, based on the larger animatronic version built by Stan Winston Studios.

Favreau wanted the film to be believable by showing the construction of the Iron Man suit in its three stages. Stan Winston, a fan of the comic book, and his company, who Favreau worked with on Zathura (2005), built metal and rubber versions of the armor. The Mark I design was intended to look like it was built from spare parts. The back is less armored than the front, because Stark would use his resources for a forward attack. It also foreshadows the design of Stane's armor. A single 41-kilogram (90 lb) version was built, causing concern when a stuntman fell over inside it, though both the stuntman and the suit were unscathed. The armor was also designed to have only its top half worn at times. Stan Winston Studios built a 3.0-metre (10 ft), 360-kilogram (800 lb) animatronic version of Iron Monger (Obadiah Stane), a name which Stane calls Tony Stark and himself earlier in the film as a reference, but is never actually used for the suit itself in the film. The animatronic required five operators for the arm, and was built on a gimbal to simulate walking. A scale model was used for the shots of it being built. The Mark II resembles an airplane prototype, with visible flaps. Iron Man comic book artist Adi Granov designed the Mark III with illustrator Phil Saunders. Granov's designs were the primary inspiration for the film's, and he came on board the film after he recognized his work on Favreau's MySpace page. Saunders streamlined Granov's concept art, making it stealthier and less cartoonish in its proportions, and also designed the War Machine armor, but it was "cut from the script about halfway through pre-production". He explained that the War Machine armor "was going to be called the Mark IV armor and would have had weaponized swap-out parts that would be worn over the original Mark III armor", and that it "would have been worn by Tony Stark in the final battle sequence".

=== Filming ===
Production was based in the former Hughes Company soundstages in Playa Vista, Los Angeles, California. Howard Hughes was one of the inspirations for the comic book, and the filmmakers acknowledged the coincidence that they would film Iron Man creating the flying Mark III where the Hughes H-4 Hercules was built. Favreau rejected the East Coast setting of the comic books because many superhero films had already been set there.

Filming began on March 12, 2007, with Matthew Libatique serving as director of photography. The first few weeks of filming were spent on Stark's captivity in Afghanistan. The cave where Stark is imprisoned was a 150-to-200-yard (140–180 m) long set, which had movable forks in the caverns to allow greater freedom for the film's crew. Production designer J. Michael Riva saw footage of a Taliban fighter in Afghanistan, and saw the cold breath as he spoke: realizing remote caves are actually very cold, Riva placed an air conditioning system in the set. He also sought Downey's advice about makeshift objects in prison, such as a sock being used to make tea. Afterwards, Stark's capture was filmed at Lone Pine, and other exterior scenes in Afghanistan were filmed at Olancha Sand Dunes, where the crew endured two days of 40-to-60-mile-per-hour (64–97 km/h) winds. During three days of filming at the Edwards Air Force Base in mid-April, around 150 servicemembers were cast as extras. Other production assistance by the United States Department of Defense included the provision of fabric for 100 uniforms, F-22 Raptors, two HH-60 helicopters and a parked C-17. In return, the Department of Defense consulted on the film regarding certain scenes and dialogue depicting the military. This included changing Stark from being opposed to arms deals, to instead becoming one who sells his technology to the U.S. military. Exterior shots of Stark's home were digitally added to footage of Point Dume in Malibu, while the interior was built at Playa Vista, where Favreau and Riva aimed to make Stark's home look less futuristic and more "grease monkey". Filming concluded on June 25, 2007, at Caesars Palace in Las Vegas, Nevada. Favreau, a newcomer to action films, remarked, "I'm shocked that I [was] on schedule. I thought that there were going to be many curveballs". He hired "people who are good at creating action", so "the human story [felt] like it belongs to the comic book genre".

There was much improvisation in dialogue scenes, because the script was not completed when filming began (the filmmakers had focused on the story making sense and planning the action). Favreau felt that improvisation would make the film feel more natural. Some scenes were shot with two cameras to capture lines said on the spot. Multiple takes were done, as Downey wanted to try something new each time. It was Downey's idea to have Stark hold a news conference on the floor, and he created the speech Stark makes when demonstrating the Jericho weapon. Downey improvised the film's final line, "I am Iron Man", which Feige felt was in line with the character's personality. Bridges described this approach as "a $200 million student film", and noted that it caused stress for Marvel executives when the stars were trying to come up with dialogue on the day of filming scenes. He also noted that in some instances, he and Downey would swap characters for rehearsal to see how their own lines sounded. Paltrow was less comfortable with improvisation, so Favreau would take notes on things she said during rehearsals or in off-handed moments that were in line with the character to incorporate into Potts' dialogue.

Samuel L. Jackson appears as Nick Fury in the film's post-credits scene

The crew conceived a post-credits scene featuring Nick Fury and called Samuel L. Jackson to ask him if he would be interested in playing Fury, as Jackson had learned a few years earlier that his likeness had been used for Fury in the Ultimate Marvel comics imprint. However, according to Latcham, Jackson originally appeared without any deal for him to reappear in later films: "It was just this weird idea that maybe people give a shi-- if we stick it on the end". The dialogue for the scene was also changed on set, with comic writer Brian Michael Bendis providing three pages of dialogue for the part, and the filmmakers choosing the best lines for filming on set. It was filmed with a skeleton crew in order to keep the cameo a secret, but rumors appeared on the Internet only days later. Feige subsequently had the scene removed from all preview prints in order to maintain the surprise and keep fans guessing. An alternate version of the Nick Fury post-credits scene was filmed in which he specifically mentions "gamma accidents, radioactive bug bites and assorted mutants", referencing Hulk, Spider-Man and the X-Men, but this was cut due to Sony Pictures and 20th Century Fox holding the respective film rights to Spider-Man and the X-Men at the time.

=== Post-production ===
Favreau's main concern with the film's effects was whether the transition between the computer-generated and practical costumes would be too obvious. He hired Industrial Light & Magic (ILM) to create the bulk of the visual effects for the film after seeing Pirates of the Caribbean: At World's End and Transformers. The Orphanage and The Embassy did additional work, with the latter creating a digital version of the Mark I armor. To help with animating the more refined suits, information was sometimes captured by having Downey wear only the helmet, sleeves and chest of the costume over a motion capture suit, and skydivers were filmed in a vertical wind tunnel to study the physics of flying. For shots of the Mark III flying, it was animated to look realistic by taking off slowly, and landing quickly. To generate shots of Iron Man and the F-22 Raptors battling, cameras were flown in the air to provide reference for physics, wind and frost on the lenses. Favreau conceived of the head-up display shots so audiences would not become disconnected from Stark when watching scenes with the CG Iron Man.

When editor Dan Lebental started compiling an initial edit of the film in late 2007, it was quickly realized that the final act of the film was not working, as it was "basically two robots punching each other". They tried shortening the sequence, which did not help as it became "both emotionally unsatisfying and abruptly anticlimactic". Marvel rehired Marcum and Holloway, as all of the screenwriters had been released from their commitments at the end of filming, who suggested the act should call back to earlier in the film when Stark was learning that one of the limitations of the suit was it freezing at high altitudes. Favreau was hesitant to commit to this change, as it would cost an additional $6 million. However, the impending writers' strike forced him to move forward with this idea, with Marcum and Holloway submitting a draft of the ending on November 4, 2007, a day before the strike began. Given no further rewrites could occur because of the strike and Bridges unable to participate in shooting new material, ILM worked with as much previously-shot footage as possible to rework the film's ending.

== Music ==
Composer Ramin Djawadi had been a fan of the character Iron Man as a child, saying that he always liked superheroes "that actually don't have any superpowers". After Favreau's previous collaborator John Debney was unavailable to score the film, Djawadi sought out the role himself. Favreau had a clear vision of heavy metal music and guitars for the project, saying that Tony Stark was more of a rock star than a traditional superhero. Djawadi subsequently composed most of the film's score on guitar, before arranging it for orchestra. Djawadi had help with arrangements and additional cues from Hans Zimmer and Remote Control Productions, and Rage Against the Machine guitarist Tom Morello, who also makes a cameo appearance in the film, contributed guitar performances to the score. The film also features a big band-style arrangement of the Iron Man theme song from the 1966 cartoon The Marvel Super Heroes from frequent Favreau collaborators John O'Brien and Rick Boston. A soundtrack featuring Djawadi's score was released by Lions Gate Records on April 29, 2008.

== Marketing ==
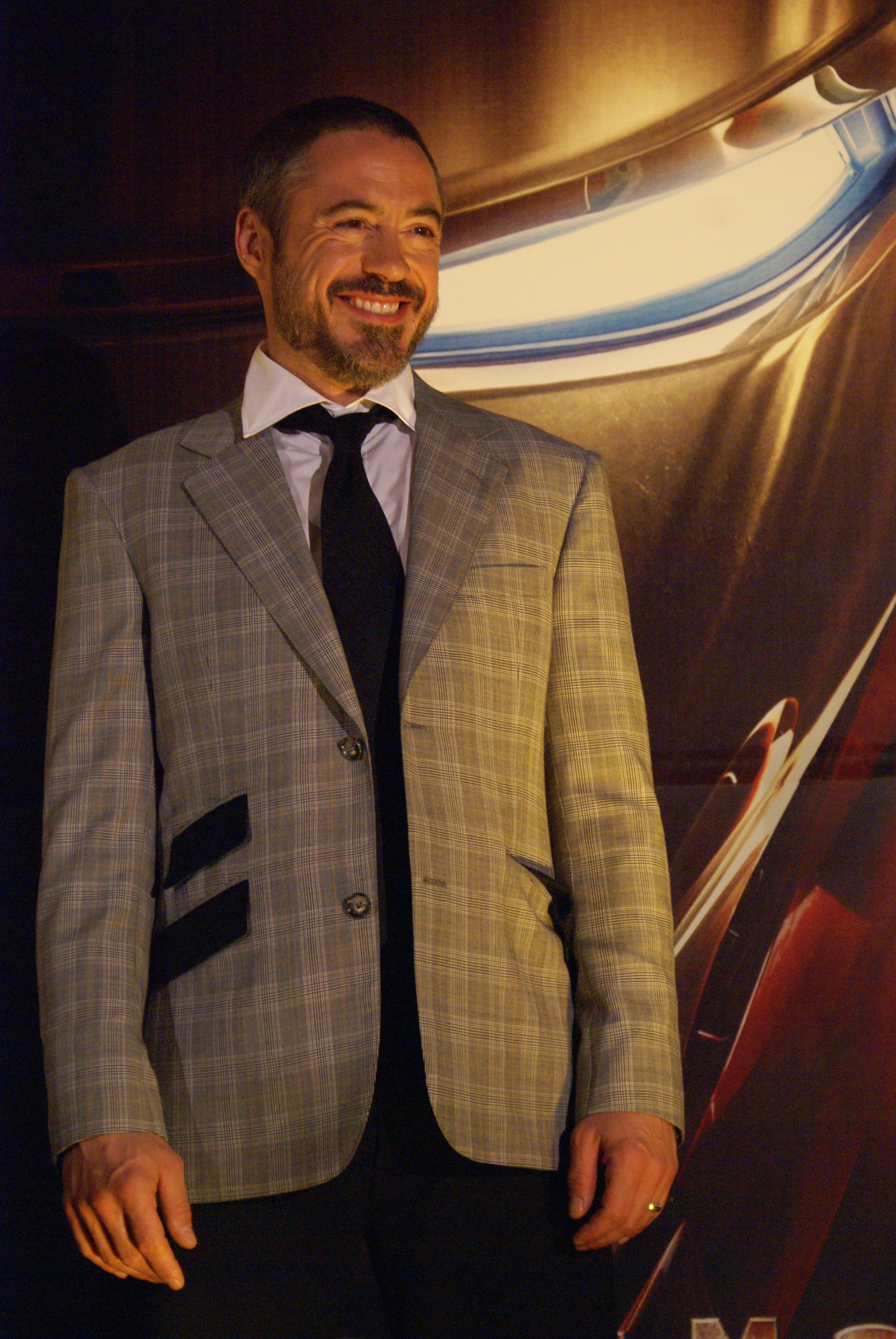
Downey promoting the film in Mexico City

In July 2006, with the film still in pre-production, Favreau and Arad attended San Diego Comic-Con to promote the film, where the film's armor design, drawn by Adi Granov, was revealed along with the announcement that the Mandarin was intended to be the antagonist of the film. The following year, Favreau returned to San Diego Comic-Con to once again promote the film with Downey and Feige, where a teaser trailer was shown. With much of the visuals not yet ready, Favreau worked with ILM to have the flying shots ready, saying "I knew that I had to make a splash because there was zero anticipation for the film at the time". Stan Winston Studios also brought a life-sized replica of the film's armor to display at the convention.

Marvel and Paramount modeled their marketing campaign for Iron Man on that of Transformers. In May 2008, Sega released an official tie-in video game based on the film on multiple gaming platforms. Downey, Howard and Toub reprise their roles from the film. A 30-second spot for the film aired during a Super Bowl XLII break. Hasbro created figures of armor from the film, as well as Titanium Man (who appears in the video game) and the armor from the World War Hulk comics.

The 7-Eleven convenience store chain helped promote the film across the United States, and LG Group also made a sponsorship deal with Paramount. Worldwide, Burger King and Audi promoted the film. Favreau was set to direct a commercial for the fast-food chain, as Transformers director Michael Bay did for that film. In the film, Tony Stark drives an Audi R8, and also has an "American cheeseburger" from Burger King after his rescue from Afghanistan, as part of the studio's product placement deal with the respective companies. Three other vehicles, the Audi S6 sedan, Audi S5 sports coupe and the Audi Q7 SUV, also appear in the film. Audi created a tie-in website, as General Motors did for Transformers. Oracle Corporation also promoted the film on its site. Several tie-in comics were released for the film.

== Release ==
=== Theatrical ===
Iron Man premiered at the Greater Union theater at George Street, Sydney, on April 14, 2008. The film began releasing in international markets on April 30, and was released in the United States on May 2. Iron Man was the first film released in Phase One of the MCU. It was re-formatted and screened in IMAX for the first time on August 30, 2018, as part of Marvel Studios' 10th anniversary IMAX festival.

=== Home media ===
The film was released by Paramount Home Entertainment on DVD and Blu-ray Disc on September 30, 2008, in the United States and Canada, and on October 27 in most of Europe. DVD sales were very successful, selling over 4 million copies the first week and generating a gross of over US$93 million. There were a total of 9 million copies sold and an accumulated total sales of over $160 million (not including Blu-ray). For the home releases of the film, the image on the newspaper Stark reads before he announces he is Iron Man had to be altered because of amateur photographer Ronnie Adams filing a lawsuit against Paramount and Marvel for using his on-location spy photo in the scene. A Walmart-exclusive DVD release included a preview of the animated series Iron Man: Armored Adventures.

The film was also collected in a 10-disc box set titled "Marvel Cinematic Universe: Phase One – Avengers Assembled" which includes all of the Phase One films in the Marvel Cinematic Universe. It was released by Walt Disney Studios Home Entertainment on April 2, 2013. The IMAX Enhanced version of the film was made available on Disney+ beginning on November 12, 2021.

== Reception ==
=== Box office ===
Iron Man grossed $319 million in the United States and Canada, and $266.8 million in other territories, for a worldwide total of $585.8 million. Reuters reported that the film's production budget was around $150 million with another $75 million for marketing costs. In November 2008, Marvel reported around $60 million in net box office revenue for the film.

In its opening weekend, Iron Man grossed $98.6 million in 4,105 theaters in the United States and Canada, ranking first at the box office, giving it the eleventh biggest-opening weekend at the time, ninth-widest release in terms of theaters, and the third highest-grossing opening weekend of 2008 behind Indiana Jones and the Kingdom of the Crystal Skull and The Dark Knight. It grossed $35.2 million on its first day, giving it the thirteenth biggest-opening day at the time. Iron Man had the second-best premiere for a non-sequel, behind Spider-Man, and the fourth biggest-opening for a superhero film. Iron Man was also the number one film in the United States and Canada in its second weekend, grossing $51.2 million, giving it the twelfth-best second weekend and the fifth-best for a non-sequel. On June 19, 2008, Iron Man became that year's first film to pass the $300 million mark for the domestic box office.

=== Critical response ===
On review aggregator Rotten Tomatoes, 94% of 278 critics gave a positive review and the average of rated reviews was 7.6/10. The critics consensus reads, "Powered by Robert Downey Jr.'s vibrant charm, Iron Man turbo-charges the superhero genre with a deft intelligence and infectious sense of fun." Metacritic, which uses a weighted average, assigned a score of 79 out of 100 based on 38 critics, indicating "generally favorable" reviews. Critics praised Downey's performance and Favreau's balance of character development and special effects. Audiences polled by CinemaScore gave the film an average grade of "A" on an A+ to F scale.

Among the major trade journals, Todd McCarthy of Variety called the film an "expansively entertaining special effects extravaganza" with "fresh energy and stylistic polish", while Kirk Honeycutt of The Hollywood Reporter praised the film, while nonetheless finding "disappointment [in] a climatic [sic] battle between different Iron Man prototypes ... how did Tony's nemesis learn how to use the suit?" In one of the first major-daily newspaper reviews, Frank Lovece of Newsday lauded the film's "emotional truth ... pitch-perfect casting and plausibly rendered super-science" that made it "faithful to the source material while updating it – and recognizing what's made that material so enduring isn't just the high-tech cool of a man in a metal suit, but the human condition that got him there". Roger Ebert of the Chicago Sun-Times gave the film four out of four stars, praising Downey's performance and stating, "At the end of the day it's Robert Downey Jr. who powers the lift-off separating this from most other superhero movies". A. O. Scott of The New York Times called the film "an unusually good superhero picture. Or at least – since it certainly has its problems – a superhero movie that's good in unusual ways." Among the specialty press, Garth Franklin of Dark Horizons commended the "impressive sets and mechanics that combine smoothly with relatively seamless CG", and said, "Robert Downey Jr., along with director Jon Favreau ... help this rise above formula. The result is something that, whilst hardly original or groundbreaking, is nevertheless refreshing in its earnestness to avoid dark dramatic stylings in favor of an easy-going, crowd-pleasing action movie with a sprinkle of anti-war and redemption themes".

Among major metropolitan weeklies, David Edelstein of New York magazine called the film "a shapely piece of mythmaking ... Favreau doesn't go in for stylized comic-book frames, at least in the first half. He gets real with it – you'd think you were watching a military thriller", while conversely, David Denby of The New Yorker gave a negative review, claiming "a slightly depressed, going-through-the-motions feel to the entire show ... Gwyneth Paltrow, widening her eyes and palpitating, can't do much with an antique role as Stark's girl Friday, who loves him but can't say so; Terrence Howard, playing a military man who chases around after Stark, looks dispirited and taken for granted". IGN's Todd Gilchrist recognized Downey as "the best thing" in a film that "functions on autopilot, providing requisite story developments and character details to fill in this default 'origin story' while the actors successfully breathe life into their otherwise conventional roles". Brent Simon of Screen Daily positively called the film "a slickly-attractive, well-cast and solidly-constructed piece of mainstream action-adventure entertainment."

=== Accolades ===
The film was nominated for Best Sound Editing and Best Visual Effects at the 81st Academy Awards, with other accolades including nominations for an Art Directors Guild Award, an Artios Award, a British Academy Film Award, a Cinema Audio Society Award, a Costume Designers Guild Award, a Critics' Choice Award, three Golden Reel Awards, a Grammy Award, a Hugo Award, four Satellite Awards (winning two), eight Saturn Awards (winning three), a Screen Actors Guild Award, and five Visual Effects Society Awards.

Iron Man was selected by the American Film Institute as one of the ten best films of the year, and it was featured on more than 100 year end lists of the top ten films of 2008. In the 2010s, Empire named the film as one of the "500 Greatest Movies of All Time", and Tony Stark as one of the "100 Greatest Movie Characters of All Time". In 2022, the Library of Congress selected Iron Man for preservation in the United States National Film Registry for being "culturally, historically, or aesthetically significant". Feige said this selection meant the film "has stood the test of time and... it is still meaningful to audiences around the world".

== Sequels ==
Favreau, Downey, Paltrow, Gregg, and Jackson all returned for Iron Man 2, which was written by Justin Theroux and released in the United States on May 7, 2010. Don Cheadle replaced Howard in the role of Colonel Rhodes, who becomes War Machine in the sequel. Also starring are Mickey Rourke as Ivan Vanko, Sam Rockwell as Justin Hammer, and Scarlett Johansson as S.H.I.E.L.D. agent Natasha Romanoff / Black Widow. Iron Man 3 was released on May 3, 2013, by Walt Disney Studios following Disney's acquisition of Marvel Entertainment. Favreau opted not to direct the film but still reprised his role as Happy Hogan. Downey, Paltrow, and Cheadle also returned, with Shane Black taking over as director, from a screenplay by Drew Pearce. Also starring are Guy Pearce as Aldrich Killian and Ben Kingsley as Trevor Slattery, an actor who poses as the Mandarin.

== See also ==
- "What If... Killmonger Rescued Tony Stark?", an episode of the MCU television series What If...? that reimagines the events of this film
- List of films featuring powered exoskeletons
- 3D human–computer interaction
