= Giulio =

Giulio (Italian: [ˈdʒuːljo]) is an Italian given name. It is also used as a surname. Notable people with the name include:

== Given name ==
=== A–K ===
- Giulio Alberoni (1664–1752), Italian cardinal and statesman
- Giulio Alenio (1582–1649), Italian Jesuit missionary and scholar
- Giulio Alfieri (1924–2002), Italian automobile engineer
- Giulio Andreotti (1919–2013), Italian politician
- Giulio Carlo Argan (1909–1992), Italian politician and art historian
- Giulio Base (born 1964), Italian film director
- Giulio Berruti (born 1984), Italian film and television actor
- Giulio Bizzozero (1846–1901), Italian physician
- Giulio Bosetti (1930–2009), Italian actor and director
- Giulio Brogi (1935–2019), Italian actor
- Giulio Caccini (c. 1545–1618), Florentine composer, significant innovator of the early Baroque era
- Giulio Calì (1895–1967), Italian actor
- Giulio Camillo (c. 1480–1544), Italian philosopher
- Giulio Campagnola (c. 1482–1515), Italian painter
- Giulio Campi (1500–1572), Italian painter and architect
- Giulio Cappelli (1911–1995), Italian footballer
- Giulio Caracciolo (archbishop of Cassano all'Jonio) (died 1599), 16th-century Roman Catholic archbishop
- Giulio Caracciolo (archbishop of Iconium) (born 1672), 17th-century Roman Catholic archbishop
- Giulio Carmassi (born 1981), Italian multi-instrumentalist
- Giulio Carmignani (1813–1890), Italian painter
- Giulio Ceretti (1868–1934), Italian engineer and entrepreneur
- Giulio Cesare (disambiguation), several people
- Giulio Ciccone (born 1994), Italian cyclist
- Giulio Clovio (1498–1578), Italian painter
- Giulio Cybo (1525–1548), Italian noble
- Giulio Doffi (1534–1596), Italian Roman Catholic prelate
- Giulio Donati (born 1990), Italian footballer
- Giulio Einaudi (1912–1999), Italian book publisher
- Giulio Evola (1898–1974), Italian metaphysician and traditionalist philosopher
- Giulio Favale (born 1998), Italian footballer
- Giulio Fioravanti (1923–1999), Italian operatic baritone
- Giulio Fiou (1938–2024), Italian politician
- Giulio Gabrielli (1604–1677), Italian Catholic cardinal
- Giulio Gabrielli the Younger (1748–1822), Italian Catholic cardinal and diplomat
- Giulio Gallera (born 1969), Italian politician
- Giulio Gaudini (1904–1948), Italian fencer
- Giulio Gavotti (1882–1939), Italian pilot in the Italo-Turkish War and the first pilot to perform an aerial bombardment
- Giulio Giorello (1945–2020), Italian philosopher, mathematician and epistemologist
- Giulio Giuricich (born 1990), South African footballer

=== L–Z ===
- Giulio Lega (1892–1973), Italian flying ace
- Giulio Lepschy (1935–2026), Italian linguist and academic
- Giulio Maceratini (1938–2020), Italian politician
- Giulio Maculani (1920–1980), Italian actor
- Giulio Martinat (1891–1943), Italian general
- Giulio de' Medici (1478–1534), better known as Pope Clement VII (1523–1534), 16th-century Catholic pope
- Giulio de' Medici (c. 1533–1600), Italian noble
- Giulio Meotti, Italian journalist
- Giulio Migliaccio (born 1981), Italian footballer
- Giulio Monteverde (1837–1917), Italian sculptor and teacher
- Giulio Natta (1903–1979), Italian chemist, Nobel Prize laureate
- Giulio Oggioni (1916–1993), Italian bishop
- Giulio Orsini (died 1517), Italian condottiero
- Giulio Pace (1550–1635), Italian philosopher
- Giulio Parigi (1571–1635), Italian painter, engraver and architect
- Giulio Parodi (born 1997), Italian footballer
- Giulio Petroni (1917–2010), Italian filmmaker
- Giulio Pittarelli (1852–1934), Italian mathematician and painter
- Giulio Prisco (born 1957), Italian computer scientist
- Giulio Prosperetti (born 1946), Italian labor law scholar and judge
- Giulio Quercini (born 1941), Italian journalist and politician
- Giulio Racah (1909–1965), Italian-Israeli mathematician and physicist
- Giulio Ravnic (born 2011), CEO of the Ravnic Company
- Giulio Regeni (1988–2016), Italian murder victim
- Giulio Regondi (1823–1872), Italian composer
- Giulio Ricciarelli (born 1965), German-Italian actor
- Giulio Ricordi (1840–1912), Italian musician
- Giulio Rinaldi (1935–2011), Italian boxer
- Giulio Romano (c. 1499–1546), Italian painter
- Giulio Rosati (1587–1917), Italian painter
- Giulio Rospigliosi, better known as Pope Clement IX (1600–1669), 17th-century Catholic pope
- Giulio Salvadori (1862–1928), Italian poet
- Giulio Sanseverino (born 1994), Italian footballer
- Giulio Santagata (born 1949), Italian politician
- Giulio Antonio Santorio (1532–1602), Italian cardinal
- Giulio Saraudi (1938–2005), Italian boxer
- Giulio Sarrocchi (1887–1971), Italian fencer
- Giulio Savelli (1941–2020), Italian politician
- Giulio Scarpati (born 1956), Italian actor
- Giulio Taccon (born 2002), Italian-Chinese pianist
- Giulio Toniolatti (born 1984), Italian rugby union player
- Giulio Tononi (born 1960), Italian neuroscientist and psychiatrist
- Giulio Turcato (1912–1995), Italian painter
- Giulio Zardo (born 1980), Canadian athlete

== Surname ==
- Carlo Ignazio Giulio (1803–1859), Italian mathematician and mechanical engineer

== Numismatic ==
- Giulio, a currency and coin of the papal states first struck by Pope Julius II

== See also ==
- Julio (disambiguation)
- Julian
- Giuliano (disambiguation)
