= 41st Saturn Awards =

US film and television award ceremony

- Date: June 25, 2015
- Site: Burbank, California, U.S.

Highlights
- Most awards: Interstellar (6)
- Most nominations: Interstellar; Captain America: The Winter Soldier (11)

The 41st Saturn Awards, honoring the best in science fiction, fantasy, horror and other genres in film and television in 2014, was held on June 25, 2015, in Burbank, California. The awards were presented by the Academy of Science Fiction, Fantasy and Horror Films. The nominations were announced in March 2015.

In film, Captain America: The Winter Soldier and Interstellar both led the nominations with eleven, followed by Guardians of the Galaxy with nine. In series, Hannibal and The Walking Dead both earned seven nominations (including a nomination in a Home Entertainment category for Hannibal).

Four persons received two nominations: James Gunn stands as the only nominated in different categories with both Best Director and Best Writing for Guardians of the Galaxy, while Peter King received two Best Make-up nominations, and Joe Letteri and Jonathan Fawkner were both nominated twice in the Best Special Effects category. Additionally, Tom Cruise broke his own record of the most Best Actor nominations by receiving a tenth nomination in the category for Edge of Tomorrow.

Interstellar won the most awards with six wins, including Best Science Fiction Film, Best Writing and Best Music, followed by Guardians of the Galaxy with four wins including Best Comic-to-Film Motion Picture, Best Director and Best Actor. Hannibal and The Walking Dead led the wins in television with three for each, including a tie between the two in the Best Actor category.

== Winners and nominees ==
=== Film ===
| Best Science Fiction Film | Best Fantasy Film |
|---|---|
| Interstellar; Dawn of the Planet of the Apes; Edge of Tomorrow; Godzilla; The Hunger Games: Mockingjay – Part 1; The Zero Theorem | The Hobbit: The Battle of the Five Armies; Birdman; The Grand Budapest Hotel; Into the Woods; Maleficent; Paddington |
| Best Horror Film | Best Thriller Film |
| Dracula Untold; Annabelle; The Babadook; Horns; Only Lovers Left Alive; The Purge: Anarchy | Gone Girl; American Sniper; The Equalizer; The Guest; The Imitation Game; Nightcrawler |
| Best Action or Adventure Film | Best International Film |
| Unbroken; Exodus: Gods and Kings; Inherent Vice; Lucy; Noah; Snowpiercer | The Theory of Everything; Bird People; Calvary; Force Majeure; Mood Indigo; The Railway Man |
| Best Animated Film | Best Comic-to-Film Motion Picture |
| The Lego Movie; Big Hero 6; The Boxtrolls; How to Train Your Dragon 2; The Wind Rises | Guardians of the Galaxy; The Amazing Spider-Man 2; Captain America: The Winter Soldier; X-Men: Days of Future Past |
| Best Director | Best Writing |
| James Gunn – Guardians of the Galaxy; Alejandro G. Iñárritu – Birdman; Doug Liman – Edge of Tomorrow; Christopher Nolan – Interstellar; Matt Reeves – Dawn of the Planet of the Apes; Joe Russo and Anthony Russo – Captain America: The Winter Soldier; Bryan Singer – X-Men: Days of Future Past | Christopher Nolan and Jonathan Nolan – Interstellar; Christopher Markus and Stephen McFeely – Captain America: The Winter Soldier; Christopher McQuarrie, Jez Butterworth and John-Henry Butterworth – Edge of Tomorrow; Wes Anderson – The Grand Budapest Hotel; James Gunn and Nicole Perlman – Guardians of the Galaxy; Fran Walsh, Philippa Boyens, Peter Jackson and Guillermo del Toro – The Hobbit: The Battle of the Five Armies; Damien Chazelle – Whiplash |
| Best Actor | Best Actress |
| Chris Pratt – Guardians of the Galaxy as Peter Quill / Star-Lord; Tom Cruise – Edge of Tomorrow as William Cage; Chris Evans – Captain America: The Winter Soldier as Steve Rogers / Captain America; Jake Gyllenhaal – Nightcrawler as Louis "Lou" Bloom; Michael Keaton – Birdman as Riggan Thomson; Matthew McConaughey – Interstellar as Joseph Cooper; Dan Stevens – The Guest as David Collins | Rosamund Pike – Gone Girl as Amy Dunne; Emily Blunt – Edge of Tomorrow as Rita Vrataski; Essie Davis – The Babadook as Amelia Vanek; Anne Hathaway – Interstellar as Amelia Brand; Angelina Jolie – Maleficent as Maleficent; Jennifer Lawrence – The Hunger Games: Mockingjay – Part 1 as Katniss Everdeen |
| Best Supporting Actor | Best Supporting Actress |
| Richard Armitage – The Hobbit: The Battle of the Five Armies as Thorin Oakenshield; Josh Brolin – Inherent Vice as Christian F. "Bigfoot" Bjornsen; Samuel L. Jackson – Captain America: The Winter Soldier as Nick Fury; Anthony Mackie – Captain America: The Winter Soldier as Sam Wilson / Falcon; Andy Serkis – Dawn of the Planet of the Apes as Caesar; J. K. Simmons – Whiplash as Terrence Fletcher | Rene Russo – Nightcrawler as Nina Romina; Jessica Chastain – Interstellar as Murphy "Murph" Cooper; Scarlett Johansson – Captain America: The Winter Soldier as Natasha Romanoff / Black Widow; Evangeline Lilly – The Hobbit: The Battle of the Five Armies as Tauriel; Emma Stone – Birdman as Sam Thomson; Meryl Streep – Into the Woods as The Witch |
| Best Performance by a Younger Actor | Best Music |
| Mackenzie Foy – Interstellar as Murphy "Murph" Cooper; Elle Fanning – Maleficent as Aurora; Chloë Grace Moretz – The Equalizer as Alina; Tony Revolori – The Grand Budapest Hotel as Zero Moustafa; Kodi Smit-McPhee – Dawn of the Planet of the Apes as Alexander; Noah Wiseman – The Babadook as Samuel Vanek | Hans Zimmer – Interstellar; Henry Jackman – Captain America: The Winter Soldier; Michael Giacchino – Dawn of the Planet of the Apes; Alexandre Desplat – Godzilla; Howard Shore – The Hobbit: The Battle of the Five Armies; John Powell – How to Train Your Dragon 2 |
| Best Editing | Best Production Design |
| James Herbert and Laura Jennings – Edge of Tomorrow; Jeffrey Ford and Matthew Schmidt – Captain America: The Winter Soldier; Fred Raskin, Craig Wood and Hughes Winborne – Guardians of the Galaxy; Lee Smith – Interstellar; Tim Squyres, William Goldenberg – Unbroken; John Ottman – X-Men: Days of Future Past | Nathan Crowley – Interstellar; Peter Wenham – Captain America: The Winter Soldier; James Chinlund – Dawn of the Planet of the Apes; Adam Stockhausen – The Grand Budapest Hotel; Charles Wood – Guardians of the Galaxy; Dennis Gassner – Into the Woods |
| Best Costume | Best Make-up |
| Ngila Dickson – Dracula Untold; Janty Yates – Exodus: Gods and Kings; Alexandra Byrne – Guardians of the Galaxy; Colleen Atwood – Into the Woods; Anna B. Sheppard – Maleficent; Louise Mingenbach – X-Men: Days of Future Past | David White and Elizabeth Yianni-Georgiou – Guardians of the Galaxy; Bill Terezakis and Lisa Love – Dawn of the Planet of the Apes; Mark Coulier and Daniel Phillips – Dracula Untold; Peter King, Rick Findlater and Gino Acevedo – The Hobbit: The Battle of the Five Armies; Peter King and Matthew Smith – Into the Woods; Adrien Morot and Norma Hill-Patton – X-Men: Days of Future Past |
| Best Special Effects | Best Independent Film |
| Paul Franklin, Andrew Lockley, Ian Hunter and Scott Fisher – Interstellar; Dan DeLeeuw, Russell Earl, Bryan Grill and Dan Sudick – Captain America: The Winter Soldier; Joe Letteri, Dan Lemmon, Daniel Barrett and Erik Winquist – Dawn of the Planet of the Apes; Gary Brozenich, Nick Davis, Jonathan Fawkner and Matthew Rouleau – Edge of Tomorrow; Stephane Ceretti, Nicolas Aithadi, Jonathan Fawkner and Paul Corbould – Guardians of the Galaxy; Joe Letteri, Eric Saindon, David Clayton and R. Christopher White – The Hobbit: The Battle of the Five Armies | Whiplash; Grand Piano; I Origins; A Most Violent Year; The One I Love; The Two Faces of January |

=== Television ===
==== Programs ====
| Best Network Television Series | Best Syndicated/Cable Television Series |
|---|---|
| Hannibal (NBC); The Blacklist (NBC); The Following (Fox); Grimm (NBC); Person of Interest (CBS); Sleepy Hollow (Fox) | The Walking Dead (AMC); American Horror Story: Freak Show (FX); Continuum (Syfy); Falling Skies (TNT); Salem (WGN America); The Strain (FX); 12 Monkeys (Syfy) |
| Best Limited Run Television Series | Best Superhero Adaptation Television Series |
| Game of Thrones (HBO); Bates Motel (A&E); From Dusk till Dawn: The Series (El Rey Network); The Last Ship (TNT); The Librarians (TNT); Outlander (Starz) | The Flash (The CW); Agent Carter (ABC); Agents of S.H.I.E.L.D. (ABC); Arrow (The CW); Constantine (NBC); Gotham (Fox) |
Best Youth-Oriented Television Series
The 100 (The CW); Doctor Who (BBC America); Pretty Little Liars (ABC Family); Supernatural (The CW); Teen Wolf (MTV); The Vampire Diaries (The CW)

==== Acting ====
| Best Actor on Television | Best Actress on Television |
|---|---|
| Hugh Dancy – Hannibal (NBC) as Will Graham (tie); Andrew Lincoln – The Walking Dead (AMC) as Rick Grimes (tie); Grant Gustin – The Flash (The CW) as Barry Allen / The Flash; Tobias Menzies – Outlander (Starz) as Frank Randall; Mads Mikkelsen – Hannibal (NBC) as Hannibal Lecter; Noah Wyle – Falling Skies (TNT) as Tom Mason | Caitríona Balfe – Outlander (Starz) as Claire Fraser; Hayley Atwell – Agent Carter (ABC) as Peggy Carter; Vera Farmiga – Bates Motel (A&E) as Norma Bates; Jessica Lange – American Horror Story: Freak Show (FX) as Elsa Mars; Rachel Nichols – Continuum (Syfy) as Kiera Cameron; Rebecca Romijn – The Librarians (TNT) as Eve Baird |
| Best Supporting Actor on Television | Best Supporting Actress on Television |
| Laurence Fishburne – Hannibal (NBC) as Jack Crawford; David Bradley – The Strain (FX) as Abraham Setrakian; Sam Heughan – Outlander (Starz) as Jamie Fraser; Erik Knudsen – Continuum (Syfy) as Alec Sadler; Norman Reedus – The Walking Dead (AMC) as Daryl Dixon; Richard Sammel – The Strain (FX) as Thomas Eichorst | Melissa McBride – The Walking Dead (AMC) as Carol Peletier; Emilia Clarke – Game of Thrones (HBO) as Daenerys Targaryen; Jenna Coleman – Doctor Who (BBC America) as Clara Oswald; Caroline Dhavernas – Hannibal (NBC) as Dr. Alana Bloom; Lexa Doig – Continuum (Syfy) as Sonya Valentine; Emily Kinney – The Walking Dead (AMC) as Beth Greene |
| Best Guest Star on Television | Best Performance by a Younger Actor in a Television Series |
| Wentworth Miller – The Flash (The CW) as Leonard Snart / Captain Cold; Dominic Cooper – Agent Carter (ABC) as Howard Stark; Neil Patrick Harris – American Horror Story: Freak Show (FX) as Chester Creb; John Larroquette – The Librarians (TNT) as Jenkins; Michael Pitt – Hannibal (NBC) as Mason Verger; Andrew J. West – The Walking Dead (AMC) as Gareth | Maisie Williams – Game of Thrones (HBO) as Arya Stark; Camren Bicondova – Gotham (Fox) as Selina Kyle; Maxim Knight – Falling Skies (TNT) as Matt Mason; Tyler Posey – Teen Wolf (MTV) as Scott McCall; Chandler Riggs – The Walking Dead (AMC) as Carl Grimes; Holly Taylor – The Americans (FX) as Paige Jennings |

=== Home Entertainment ===
| Best DVD or Blu-ray Release | Best DVD or Blu-ray Special Edition Release |
|---|---|
| Odd Thomas; Beneath; Blue Ruin; Ragnarok; White Bird in a Blizzard; Wolf Creek 2 | Nightbreed: The Director's Cut; Alexander: The Ultimate Cut; The Hobbit: The Desolation of Smaug: Extended Edition; Once Upon a Time in America: Extended Director's Cut; Sorcerer; The Texas Chain Saw Massacre: 40th Anniversary Collector's Edition |
| Best DVD or Blu-ray Collection | Best DVD or Blu-ray TV Series |
| Halloween: The Complete Collection (Halloween (1978), Halloween II (1981), Halloween III: Season of the Witch, Halloween 4: The Return of Michael Myers, Halloween 5: The Revenge of Michael Myers, Halloween: The Curse of Michael Myers, Halloween H20: 20 Years Later, Halloween: Resurrection, Halloween (2007) and Halloween II (2009)); The Exorcist: The Complete Anthology (The Exorcist, Exorcist II: The Heretic, The Exorcist III, Exorcist: The Beginning and Dominion: Prequel to the Exorcist); Stanley Kubrick: The Masterpiece Collection (Lolita, Dr. Strangelove, 2001: A Space Odyssey, A Clockwork Orange, Barry Lyndon, The Shining, Full Metal Jacket and Eyes Wide Shut); Steven Spielberg Director's Collection (Duel, The Sugarland Express, Jaws, 1941, E.T. the Extra-Terrestrial, Always, Jurassic Park, The Lost World: Jurassic Park); Toho Godzilla Collection (Godzilla, Godzilla Raids Again, Mothra vs. Godzilla, Ghidorah, the Three-Headed Monster, Invasion of Astro-Monster and Terror of Mechagodzilla); Universal Classic Monsters: Complete 30 Films Collection (Dracula, Frankenstein, The Mummy, The Invisible Man, Bride of Frankenstein, Werewolf of London, Dracula's Daughter, Son of Frankenstein, The Invisible Man Returns, The Invisible Woman, The Mummy's Hand, The Wolf Man, The Ghost of Frankenstein, The Mummy's Ghost, The Mummy's Tomb, Invisible Agent, Phantom of the Opera, Frankenstein Meets the Wolf Man, Son of Dracula, House of Frankenstein, The Mummy's Curse, The Invisible Man's Revenge, House of Dracula, She-Wolf of London, Abbott and Costello Meet Frankenstein, Abbott and Costello Meet the Invisible Man, Creature from the Black Lagoon, Abbott and Costello Meet the Mummy, Revenge of the Creature and The Creature Walks Among Us) | Twin Peaks: The Entire Mystery (Twin Peaks: Season 1 & 2 and Twin Peaks: Fire Walk with Me); Batman: The Complete Television Series; Hannibal: Season 2; Merlin: The Complete Series; Spartacus: The Complete Series; Star Trek: The Next Generation: Season 7; Wizards and Warriors: The Complete Series |

=== Special awards ===
Artist Showcase Award

- Noah Wyle

Breakthrough Performance Award

- Grant Gustin for The Flash

Special Recognition Award

- Continuum

The Dan Curtis Legacy Award

- Carlton Cuse

== Multiple nominations and wins ==
=== Film ===
The following works received multiple nominations:

11 nominations: Captain America: The Winter Soldier, Interstellar
9 nominations: Guardians of the Galaxy
8 nominations: Dawn of the Planet of the Apes
7 nominations: Edge of Tomorrow, The Hobbit: The Battle of the Five Armies
5 nominations: Into the Woods, X-Men: Days of Future Past
4 nominations: Birdman, The Grand Budapest Hotel, Maleficent
3 nominations: The Babadook, Dracula Untold, Nightcrawler, Whiplash
2 nominations: The Equalizer, Exodus: Gods and Kings, Godzilla, Gone Girl, The Guest,
How to Train Your Dragon 2, The Hunger Games: Mockingjay – Part 1, Inherent Vice, Unbroken

The following works received multiple wins:

6 wins: Interstellar
4 wins: Guardians of the Galaxy
2 wins: Dracula Untold, Gone Girl, The Hobbit: The Battle of the Five Armies

=== Television ===
The following works received multiple nominations:

7 nominations: The Walking Dead
6 nominations: Hannibal
4 nominations: Continuum, Outlander
3 nominations: Agent Carter, American Horror Story: Freak Show, Falling Skies, The Flash, Game of Thrones, The Librarians, The Strain
2 nominations: The Americans, Bates Motel, Doctor Who, Gotham, Teen Wolf

The following works received multiple wins:

3 wins: Hannibal, The Walking Dead
2 wins: The Flash, Game of Thrones
