= Ceretti =

Ceretti is an Italian surname. Notable people with the surname include:

- Bill Ceretti (1912–1974), offensive and defensive lineman
- Catherine Rousselet-Ceretti (born 1943), French fencer
- Celso Ceretti (1844–1909), Italian supporter of Giuseppe Garibaldi, internationalist anarchist and socialist politician
- Giulio Ceretti (1868–1934), Italian engineer and entrepreneur
- Stéphane Ceretti (born 1973), French visual effects supervisor
- Vittoria Ceretti (born 1998), Italian model

== See also ==
- Ceretto (disambiguation)
