= Paul Corbould =

British special effects supervisor

- Occupation: Special effects supervisor
- Years active: 1979–present

Paul Corbould (/ˈkɔːrboʊld/) is a British special effects supervisor best known for his work on major blockbuster films such as Children of Men (2006), Captain America: The First Avenger (2011), Thor: The Dark World (2013), and most recently Guardians of the Galaxy (2014). He is a brother of Oscar-winning special effect supervisors Chris Corbould and Neil Corbould.

For his work in Guardians of the Galaxy, he achieved critical success and received his first Best Visual Effects nomination at the 87th Academy Awards which he shared with Stephane Ceretti, Jonathan Fawkner and Nicolas Aithadi. He was nominated at the 68th British Academy Film Awards in same category with Stephane, Jonathan and Nicolas.

== Special effects filmography ==
=== Film ===
Year	Film	Role
2024	Wicked Part One	special effects supervisor
2023	Heart of Stone	special effects supervisor
2023	Ant-Man and the Wasp: Quantumania	special effects supervisor
2022	Jurassic World Dominion	special effects supervisor
2021	Black Widow	special effects supervisor
2019	Men in Black: International	special effects supervisor
2017	Dunkirk	special effects supervisor
2017	Beauty and the Beast	special effects supervisor
2016	Doctor Strange	special effects supervisor
2015	Avengers: Age of Ultron	special effects supervisor
2014	Guardians of the Galaxy	special effects supervisor
2013	47 Ronin	special effects coordinator
2013	Thor: The Dark World	assistant special effects coordinator
2012	Skyfall	special effects floor supervisor
2012	John Carter	assistant special effects supervisor
2011	Captain America: The First Avenger	special effects supervisor
2010	The Wolfman	special effects supervisor
2008	Inkheart	special effects supervisor
2008	Body of Lies	special effects supervisor
2008	Mamma Mia!	special effects supervisor
2007	1408	special effects supervisor
2006	Children of Men	special effects supervisor
2006	As You Like It	special effects supervisor
2005	V for Vendetta	special effects supervisor
2005	Goal! The Dream Begins	special effects supervisor
2005	Kingdom of Heaven	special effects assistant supervisor
2004	Wimbledon	special effects supervisor
2004	King Arthur	special effects senior technician
2002	Die Another Day	senior special effects technician
2001	Black Hawk Down	assistant special effects supervisor - as Paul Grant Corbould
2000	Gladiator	floor supervisor
1999	Captain Jack	special effects technician
1999	Entrapment	special effects floor supervisor: second unit
1998	Saving Private Ryan	lead senior special effects technician
1997	The Peacemaker	special effects technician: UK
1997	Event Horizon	special effects supervisor
1994	Immortal Beloved	special effects assistant
1992	Orlando	special effects technician
1992	The Power of One	special effects
1991	Let Him Have It	special effects technician - as Paul Corbold
1990	The Rainbow Thief	special effects technician
1987	Withnail & I	special effects
1985	Steaming	special effects
1984	Amadeus	special effects
1983	Superman III	special effects - uncredited
1983	The Hunger	special effects
1981	The French Lieutenant's Woman	special effects - uncredited
1980	Hawk the Slayer	special effects
1980	The Elephant Man	special effects - uncredited

=== Television ===
Year	Series	Role
2012	The Borgias: "The Siege at Forli"; "Day of Ashes"	special effects (TV Series)
2001	Band of Brothers: "Currahee"; "Points"	floor leader and senior special effects technician - 2 episodes (TV miniseries)
1996	Gulliver's Travels	special effects supervisor (TV miniseries)
1994	Bermuda Grace	Special effects technician (TV movie)
1993	Harnessing Peacocks	Special effects (TV movie)
1993	Heartbeat: "Riders of the Storm"	Special effects chief - one episode (TV series)
1992	The Blackheath Poisonings	special effects technician
1989	Back Home	special effects technician (TV movie)
1988	The Dirty Dozen: The Fatal Mission	special effects technician - uncredited (TV movie)
1986	The Last Days of Patton	special effects - uncredited (TV movie)
1985	Jenny's War	special effects - (TV Movie)
1985	Space	special effects (TV miniseries)
1985	Murder with Mirrors	special effects technician - uncredited (TV Movie)
1983	The Winds of War	special effects - (TV miniseries)

== Accolades ==
Year Ceremony	Category	Nominated work	Recipients	Result
Academy Awards
February 22, 2015; Oscars 2014	Best Visual Effects	Guardians of the Galaxy	Shared with: Stephane Ceretti; Jonathan Fawkner; Nicolas Aithadi	Nominated
February 26, 2017; Oscars 2017	Best Visual Effects	Doctor Strange	Shared with: Stephane Ceretti; Richard Bluff; Vincent Cirelli	Nominated
March 2, 2025; Oscars 2025	Best Visual Effects	Wicked Part One	Shared with: Pablo Helman; Jonathan Fawkner; David Shirk	Nominated
British Academy Film Awards
February 11, 2007; 60th BAFTAs	Best Special Visual Effects	Children of Men	Shared with: Mike Eames; Frazer Churchill; Tim Webber	Nominated
February 8, 2015; 68th BAFTAs	Best Special Visual Effects	Guardians of the Galaxy	Shared with: Stephane Ceretti; Jonathan Fawkner; Nicolas Aithadi	Nominated
February 12, 2017; 70th BAFTAs	Best Special Visual Effects	Doctor Strange	Shared with: Stephane Ceretti; Richard Bluff; Vincent Cirelli	Nominated
Visual Effects Society Awards
February 12, 2007; 5th VES Awards	Outstanding Supporting Visual Effects in a Feature Motion Picture	Children of Men	Shared with: Lucy Killick; Frazer Churchill; Tim Webber	Nominated
February 4, 2015; 13th VES Awards	Outstanding Visual Effects in an Effects Driven Photoreal/Live Action Feature Motion Picture	Guardians of the Galaxy	Shared with: Stephane Ceretti; Susan Pickett; Jonathan Fawkner; Nicolas Aithadi	Nominated
February 7, 2018; 15th VES Awards	Outstanding Visual Effects in a Photoreal Feature	Doctor Strange	Shared with: Stephane Ceretti; Susan Pickett; Richard Bluff; Vincent Cirelli	Nominated
Saturn Awards
July 26, 2012; 38th Saturn Awards	Best Special Effects	Captain America: The First Avenger	Shared with: Mark G. Soper; Christopher Townsend	Nominated
June 26, 2014; 40th Saturn Awards	Best Special Effects	Thor: The Dark World	Shared with: Jake Morrison; Mark Breakspear	Nominated
June 25, 2015; 41st Saturn Awards	Best Special Effects	Guardians of the Galaxy	Shared with: Stephane Ceretti; Jonathan Fawkner; Nicolas Aithadi	Nominated
June 22, 2016; 42nd Saturn Awards	Best Special Effects	Avengers: Age of Ultron	Shared with: Christopher Townsend; Ben Snow; Paul Butterworth	Nominated
