= Doctor Strange (2016 film) =

Marvel Studios film

- Theatrical release poster
- Directed by: Scott Derrickson
- Written by: Jon Spaihts; Scott Derrickson; C. Robert Cargill
- Based on: Doctor Strange by: Stan Lee; Steve Ditko
- Produced by: Kevin Feige
- Starring: Benedict Cumberbatch; Chiwetel Ejiofor; Rachel McAdams; Benedict Wong; Michael Stuhlbarg; Benjamin Bratt; Scott Adkins; Mads Mikkelsen; Tilda Swinton
- Cinematography: Ben Davis
- Edited by: Wyatt Smith; Sabrina Plisco
- Music by: Michael Giacchino
- Production company: Marvel Studios
- Distributed by: Walt Disney Studios Motion Pictures
- Release dates: October 13, 2016 (Hong Kong); November 4, 2016 (United States)
- Running time: 115 minutes
- Country: United States
- Language: English
- Budget: $165–236.6 million
- Box office: $677.8 million

Doctor Strange is a 2016 American superhero film based on the Marvel Comics character Doctor Strange. Produced by Marvel Studios and distributed by Walt Disney Studios Motion Pictures, it is the 14th film in the Marvel Cinematic Universe (MCU). The film was directed by Scott Derrickson from a screenplay he wrote with Jon Spaihts and C. Robert Cargill, and stars Benedict Cumberbatch as Dr. Stephen Strange alongside Chiwetel Ejiofor, Rachel McAdams, Benedict Wong, Michael Stuhlbarg, Benjamin Bratt, Scott Adkins, Mads Mikkelsen, and Tilda Swinton. In the film, Strange is an arrogant neurosurgeon who, following a career-ending car crash, discovers the mystic arts and trains to be a sorcerer.

Various incarnations of a Doctor Strange film adaptation had been in development since the mid-1980s, until Paramount Pictures acquired the film rights in April 2005 on behalf of Marvel Studios. Thomas Dean Donnelly and Joshua Oppenheimer were brought on board in June 2010 to write a screenplay. In June 2014, Derrickson was hired to direct, with Spaihts re-writing the script. Cumberbatch was chosen for the eponymous role in December 2014, necessitating a schedule change to work around his other commitments. This gave Derrickson time to work on the script himself, for which he brought Cargill on to help. Principal photography on the film began in November 2015 in Nepal, before moving to England and wrapping up in New York City in April 2016.

Doctor Strange had its world premiere in Hong Kong on October 13, 2016, and was released in the United States on November 4, as part of Phase Three of the MCU. It received positive reviews and grossed $677.8 million worldwide. The film received an Academy Award nomination for Best Visual Effects. A sequel, Doctor Strange in the Multiverse of Madness, was released in May 2022.

== Plot ==
In Kathmandu, the sorcerer Kaecilius and his zealots enter the secret compound Kamar-Taj and behead its librarian. They steal several pages from a book belonging to the Ancient One, a long-lived sorcerer who has taught every student at Kamar-Taj, including Kaecilius, in the mystic arts. The Ancient One pursues the traitors, but Kaecilius and his followers escape.

In New York City, Dr. Stephen Strange, a wealthy, acclaimed, and arrogant neurosurgeon, severely injures his hands in a car crash while en route to a speaking conference, leaving him permanently unable to operate. Fellow surgeon Christine Palmer tries to help him move on, but Strange vainly pursues experimental surgeries to heal his hands. Strange learns about Jonathan Pangborn, a paraplegic who mysteriously regained use of his legs. Pangborn directs Strange to Kamar-Taj, where he is taken in by Mordo, a sorcerer under the Ancient One. The Ancient One demonstrates her power to Strange, revealing the astral plane and other dimensions such as the Mirror Dimension. She reluctantly agrees to train Strange, whose arrogance and ambition remind her of Kaecilius.

Strange studies under the Ancient One and Mordo, and from ancient texts in the library that are now guarded by Master Wong. Strange learns that Earth is protected from threats from other dimensions by a shield generated from three Sanctums in New York City, London, and Hong Kong, which are all directly accessible from Kamar-Taj. The sorcerers' task is to protect the Sanctums, though Pangborn instead chose to channel mystical energy only to heal his paralysis. Strange progresses quickly, and secretly reads the book from which Kaecilius stole pages, learning to bend time with the Eye of Agamotto. Mordo and Wong warn Strange against breaking the laws of nature, drawing a comparison to Kaecilius' desire for eternal life.

Kaecilius uses the stolen pages to contact Dormammu of the Dark Dimension, where time is non-existent, and destroys the London Sanctum to weaken Earth's protection. The zealots then attack the New York Sanctum, killing its guardian, but Strange holds them off with the help of the Cloak of Levitation, only to be critically injured during a skirmish. He teleports himself back to the hospital where Palmer saves him. Upon returning to the Sanctum, Strange reveals to Mordo that the Ancient One has been drawing power from the Dark Dimension to sustain long life, and Mordo becomes disillusioned with her. After a fight in the Mirror Dimension of New York, Kaecilius mortally wounds the Ancient One and escapes to Hong Kong. Before dying, she tells Strange that he and Mordo will have to work together to defeat Kaecilius, balancing Mordo's steadfast nature against Strange's willingness to bend the rules. Strange and Mordo arrive in Hong Kong to find Wong dead, the Sanctum destroyed, and the Dark Dimension engulfing Earth. Strange uses the Eye to reverse time and save Wong, then enters the Dark Dimension and creates an endless time loop around himself and Dormammu. After repeatedly killing Strange to no avail, Dormammu finally accepts his bargain, leaving Earth permanently and taking Kaecilius and the zealots with him in exchange for Strange breaking the loop.

Disgusted by Strange and the Ancient One defying nature's laws, Mordo renounces his sorcerer career and departs. Strange returns the Eye, which is revealed to hold an Infinity Stone, back to Kamar-Taj and takes up residence in the New York Sanctum to continue his studies with Wong. In a mid-credits scene, Strange decides to help Thor, who has brought his brother Loki to Earth to search for their father, Odin. (Note: As depicted in Thor: Ragnarok (2017)) In a post-credits scene, Mordo confronts Pangborn and steals the mystical energy he uses, telling him that Earth has "too many sorcerers".

== Cast ==
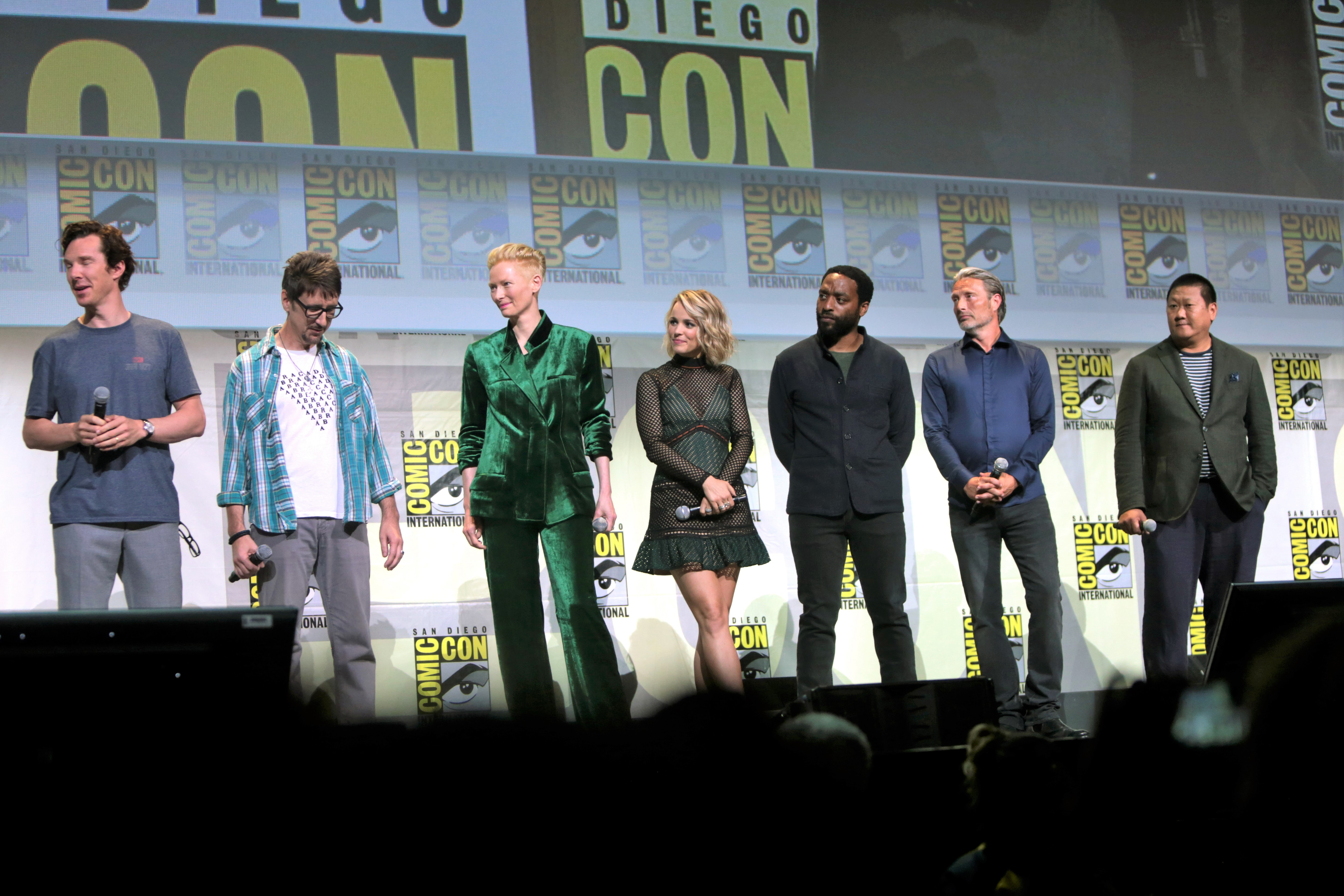
Left to right: Cumberbatch, Derrickson, Swinton, McAdams, Ejiofor, Mikkelsen, and Wong at the 2016 San Diego Comic-Con

- Benedict Cumberbatch as Dr. Stephen Strange:
  A neurosurgeon who, after a car crash that led to a journey of healing, discovers the hidden world of magic and alternate dimensions. Cumberbatch described Strange as arrogant, with the film "about him going from a place where he thinks he knows it all to realizing he knows nothing." He compared the character to the version of Sherlock Holmes that he portrays in Sherlock, calling both characters "intelligent" and having "smatterings of the same colors". The film's mysticism resonated with Cumberbatch, for whom spirituality has been important since he spent his gap year teaching English at a Tibetan Buddhist monastery in Darjeeling, India. Strange's abilities in the film include casting spells with "tongue-twisty fun names", creating mandalas of light for shields and weapons, and creating portals for quick travel around the world. Strange is also aided by a Cloak of Levitation for flight, and the Eye of Agamotto, a relic containing an Infinity Stone that can manipulate time. Cumberbatch took great care in defining the physical movements and gestures for the spells, knowing that they would be noted and studied by fans. He described these gestures as "balletic" and "very dynamic", and received help with finger-tutting movements from dancer JayFunk.
- Chiwetel Ejiofor as Karl Mordo:
  A Master of the Mystic Arts, close to the Ancient One and a mentor to Strange. This version of Mordo is a combination of different characters from the Doctor Strange mythos, and unlike in the comics is not introduced as villainous. Ejiofor noted this, calling Mordo "a very complex character that, really, I don't think can be nailed down either way". Director Scott Derrickson added that the change in character stemmed from casting Ejiofor and conversations the director had with him. Ejiofor described Mordo's relationship with the Ancient One as "long and intense", while noting a "growing respect" between the character and Strange, until "things get complicated". Derrickson felt Mordo was a fundamentalist, saying "When someone gives themselves over to an extraordinarily strict moral code, the process of breaking out of that is a violent one. He becomes disillusioned with the Ancient One's [moral contradictions]. The difference is Strange can accept that contradiction. Mordo cannot cope with it," which leads to the "antagonism between Mordo and Strange" to explore in future films. Discussing the diversity of the film's cast when addressing the controversial casting of the characters the Ancient One and Wong, Derrickson was confident that the decision to cast Ejiofor as Mordo, and thus changing the character "from white to black", was the right one to make.
- Rachel McAdams as Christine Palmer:
  An emergency surgeon initially written as a love interest for Strange, but shortly before filming, Derrickson suggested that this trope be subverted by making the two characters lovers as part of their backstory and coming "out the other side of it as friends". McAdams described this dynamic by saying, "The love is between them no matter what stage they're at in the actual relationship." With this change in characterization, producer Kevin Feige described Palmer as a "lynchpin to [Strange's] old life, once he steps into the role of a sorcerer. She is someone he connects with at the beginning, and reconnects with, and helps anchor his humanity." He explained that having this character be a "connection to Strange's life in New York City, in the normal world" after his journey was important to the studio, which is why Palmer was chosen for the character over the more prominent, but more fantastical character Clea. Palmer is also known as the hero Night Nurse in the comics, a storyline that does not play into the film, but that Feige hinted could be explored in future films. Rosario Dawson portrays another Night Nurse character, Claire Temple, in Marvel's Netflix television series.
- Benedict Wong as Wong:
  A Master of the Mystic Arts, tasked with protecting some of Kamar-Taj's most valuable relics and books. The character is depicted in the comics as Strange's Asian, "tea-making manservant", a racial stereotype that Derrickson did not want in the film, and so the character was not included in the film's script. After the non-Asian actress Tilda Swinton was cast as the other significant Asian character from the Doctor Strange comics, the Ancient One—which was also done to avoid the comics' racial stereotypes—Derrickson felt obligated to find a way to include Wong in the film. The character as he ultimately appears is "completely subverted as a character and reworked into something that didn't fall into any of the stereotypes of the comics", which Derrickson was pleased gave an Asian character "a strong presence in the movie". Actor Wong was also pleased with the changes made to the character, and described him as "a drill sergeant to Kamar-Taj" rather than a manservant. He does not practice martial arts in the film, avoiding another racial stereotype. Derrickson added that Wong will have "a strong presence in the Marvel Cinematic Universe" moving forward.
- Michael Stuhlbarg as Nicodemus West: A rival surgeon to Strange.
- Benjamin Bratt as Jonathan Pangborn: A paraplegic who learned from the Ancient One how to heal himself through the mystic arts.
- Scott Adkins as Lucian: One of Kaecilius' followers.
- Mads Mikkelsen as Kaecilius:
  A Master of the Mystic Arts who broke away from the Ancient One. A combination of several antagonists from the comics, Kaecilius was used in the film to drive the introduction and development of bigger villains for the future, including "certain individuals who live in other dimensions". Derrickson compared this dynamic to that of Saruman and Sauron in The Lord of the Rings, giving the film a "huge and fantastical" villain like Sauron, but also having "human relateability" with Kaecilius, like Saruman, for Strange to face throughout the film. Derrickson admitted that Marvel's villains are often criticized, and noted that MCU films dedicate little time to developing antagonists. For Doctor Strange, he just hoped to show "Kaecilius's point of view and what makes him tick" in the time that he could, feeling that the character is a "man of ideas" with "watertight logic" like John Doe from Seven and the Joker from The Dark Knight. On these motivations, Feige explained that Kaecilius believes the Ancient One is a hypocrite, protecting her own power base, and that the world may be better off "if we were to allow some of these other things through." Mikkelsen's makeup took between 2–3 hours to apply.
- Tilda Swinton as the Ancient One:
  A Celtic mystic who becomes Strange's mentor. The character is a Tibetan man in the comics, and co-writer C. Robert Cargill said adapting the character as the comics portrayed him would realize the major Asian Fu Manchu stereotype while entangling the film in the Tibetan sovereignty debate. However, not giving one of few significant Asian roles to an Asian actor would also be received negatively; Cargill compared this situation to the Kobayashi Maru, an unwinnable training exercise from Star Trek. Derrickson wanted to change the character to an Asian woman, but felt an older Asian woman would invoke the Dragon Lady stereotype, while a younger Asian woman would be perceived as exploiting Asian fetish and be a "fanboy's dream girl". He also wanted to avoid the stereotype of a "Western character coming to Asia to learn about being Asian", and decided to cast a non-Asian actor in the role. Derrickson still wanted to take the opportunity to cast an actress in the previously male role, and wrote the character with Swinton in mind as he felt she was the obvious choice to play "domineering, secretive, ethereal, enigmatic, [and] mystical". Additionally, though the film uses the terms "her" and "she", Swinton chose to portray the character as androgynous, while Feige explained that the Ancient One and Sorcerer Supreme are mantles in the film held by multiple characters through time, so a more comic-accurate Ancient One could still exist within the MCU. Despite this, Swinton's casting was widely criticized as whitewashing. Derrickson said he was pleased with the diversity of the film's cast, in terms of both gender and ethnicity, but acknowledged that "Asians have been whitewashed and stereotyped in American cinema for over a century and people should be mad or nothing will change. What I did was the lesser of two evils, but it is still an evil." Looking back at the casting in May 2021, Feige said the studio thought they were being "so smart and so cutting-edge" when they avoided the wise old Asian man stereotype, but the criticism of the casting was a wake-up call that made them realize they could have cast an Asian actor in the role without falling into stereotypes.

Cumberbatch also portrays, uncredited, the villainous entity Dormammu. The actor suggested he take on the role to Derrickson, feeling that having the character be a "horrific" reflection of Strange would work better than just "being a big ghoulish monster". The director agreed, elaborating that the casting implies that Dormammu does not have a normal physical form in his own dimension, and so is simply imitating Strange for their confrontation. To create the character, Cumberbatch provided motion-capture reference for the visual effects team, and his voice was blended with that of another uncredited British actor, whom Derrickson described as having "a very deep voice". The producers also had Tony Todd record voice over for Dormammu as an alternative to Cumberbatch, but ultimately decided on using Cumberbatch for the voice.

Chris Hemsworth reprises his role of Thor from previous MCU films in the film's mid-credits scene. Additionally, Linda Louise Duan appears, unnamed, as Tina Minoru, Mark Anthony Brighton portrays Daniel Drumm, and Topo Wresniwiro portrays Hamir, all Masters of the Mystic Arts under the Ancient One. The latter is based on Hamir the Hermit, Wong's father in the comics, who was the Ancient One's personal manservant. The character is neither a manservant nor Wong's father in the film. Zara Phythian, Alaa Safi, and Katrina Durden portray zealots under Kaecilius, and Pat Kiernan appears as himself. Stan Lee makes a cameo appearance as a bus rider reading Aldous Huxley's The Doors of Perception. Amy Landecker was cast as anesthesiologist Bruner, but the majority of her role was cut from the finished film.

== Production ==
=== Development ===
A film based on the Marvel Comics character Doctor Strange was initially listed as being in development at New World Pictures, with a script dated January 21, 1986, by Bob Gale, which never went further into production. By 1989, Alex Cox had co-written a script with Marvel Comics' Stan Lee. The script had the character traveling to the Fourth Dimension before facing the villain Dormammu on Easter Island, Chile. A film using this script was almost made by Regency, but Regency's films were distributed by Warner Bros. at the time, which was in a dispute with Marvel over merchandising. Around this time, producer Charles Band optioned the property from Marvel and began developing a film at his studio Full Moon Entertainment. However, the option expired before production could begin and the project was reworked into the 1992 film Doctor Mordrid, whose titular character bore similarities to Doctor Strange. By December 1992, Wes Craven had signed to write and direct Doctor Strange for release in either 1994 or 1995, with Savoy Pictures distributing. In 1995, David S. Goyer had completed a script for the film. By April 1997, Columbia Pictures had purchased the film rights and Jeff Welch was working on a new screenplay, with Bernie Brillstein and Brad Grey producing.

By April 2000, Columbia dropped Doctor Strange, which then had Michael France attached to write a script and interest from Chuck Russell and Stephen Norrington to direct. By June 2001, Dimension Films acquired the film rights, with Goyer back on board as writer and director. Goyer hinted scheduling conflicts might ensue with a film adaptation of Murder Mysteries, and promised not to be highly dependent on computer-generated imagery. However, by August 2001, Miramax Films acquired the film rights from Dimension Films, and by March 2002, Goyer had dropped out of the project. A 2005 release date was announced the next March, while in June 2004, a script still had yet to be written. Marvel Studios CEO Avi Arad stated, "We are nowhere with that. That's a tough one to write, but we are working on it. We are trying to find the real Jerry Garcia of the writing community." In April 2005, Paramount Pictures acquired Doctor Strange from Miramax Films, as part of Marvel Studios' attempt to independently produce their own films. At the time, the film was projected to have a budget of no more than $165 million. In 2007, Guillermo del Toro and Neil Gaiman pitched a version of the film to Marvel, with Gaiman writing and del Toro directing. Their version would have seen the character be alcoholic and a disbarred physician in the late 1920s or early 1930s and he would have been living in Greenwich Village for 90 years without aging. It would have also been heavily inspired by the art of Steve Ditko. Gaiman was especially interested in including the character Clea, but the studio was not interested.

In March 2009, Marvel hired writers to help come up with creative ways to launch its lesser-known properties, including Doctor Strange. In June 2010, Marvel Studios hired Thomas Dean Donnelly and Joshua Oppenheimer to write Doctor Strange. While promoting Transformers: Dark of the Moon in April 2011, actor Patrick Dempsey indicated he was lobbying to play the title character. In January 2013, Marvel Studios president Kevin Feige confirmed that Doctor Strange would appear in some capacity as part of Phase Three of the Marvel Cinematic Universe. Feige then reiterated that a Doctor Strange feature film was in development at Marvel Studios that May, and again in November. In February 2014, The Hollywood Reporter wrote that Marvel was considering Mark Andrews, Jonathan Levine, Nikolaj Arcel and Dean Israelite to direct the film, and was considering Jonathan Aibel and Glenn Berger to rewrite the film's script. Feige denied this report, but confirmed that Marvel was considering prospective candidates. By March, Marvel was considering Andrews, Levine, and Scott Derrickson to direct the film.

=== Pre-production ===
I think when you consider the work that I've done it makes sense that he'd be my favorite comic book character, at least in the Marvel universe. Probably the only comic character in that mainstream world that I'm suited to. I feel such an affinity for the character and the story and the ambition of those comics, especially the original Stan Lee and Steve Ditko Strange Tales—I think those are my favorite of all of them. The entire history of the comics is extraordinary.

— Scott Derrickson, director of Doctor Strange

In June 2014, Derrickson was chosen to direct the film. He had written a 12-page scene for the film featuring Strange and an assailant fighting in the astral plane while a doctor attempts to save Strange's physical body in a hospital, based on a sequence from the comic Doctor Strange: The Oath. Derrickson illustrated the sequence with his own concept art, alongside storyboards from professional artists and an animatic, which he presented in a 90-minute pitch to the studio. This cost Derrickson an "obnoxious amount" of his own money, but he felt it necessary to prove "that I wanted [the job] more than anyone", especially after Marvel told him that more people had lobbied to direct Doctor Strange than any of their other films. Derrickson ultimately had eight meetings with Marvel for the film. After he was hired, Marvel bought the 12-page scene from Derrickson, and it became one of the film's main set pieces.

On transitioning from horror films to a superhero film, Derrickson said, "It was nice to work on something more positive. And not have my headspace in something so dark for so long. But it was also weirdly similar because of the fantastical nature of the movie". In his horror films, Derrickson tried to use "real characters and real character drama played by good actors ... [to] encounter the fantastical", and so he wanted actors of the same high caliber for Doctor Strange through which he could introduce the more fantastical elements to the MCU.

Derrickson and Marvel had originally discussed him writing the film alongside his Sinister co-writer C. Robert Cargill, with Derrickson also directing, but Marvel felt that they would not be able to reach their intended release date of July 2016 if Derrickson filled both roles. When Derrickson was chosen as director, Marvel passed on Cargill as an individual writer, with Jon Spaihts hired to rewrite the script instead. Spaihts, a big fan of Doctor Strange as a child, had started "pestering" Marvel as soon as he read reports of the company searching for a director for the film. This eventually led to him meeting with the studio, before they actually began looking for writers for the film. Spaihts said that they talked "all afternoon, and the fit was right", but he received a call from Marvel several days later saying that they were not completely sure they wanted to take the film in the same direction as Spaihts, and were going to look at other writers. Spaihts told his agent to not "take that answer. Call them back, tell them there's a lot of right answers, and get me back in the room", and after talking with Marvel for "another three or four hours" he was given the job. Marvel never seriously looked at any other writer for the film.

Derrickson was already hired when Spaihts joined, and the pair spent several months working on the film's story with Feige and executive producer Stephen Broussard. They started writing the film from the beginning, and initially were unsure whether it would be an origin story, or if it would begin with Strange already as a "fully-formed" sorcerer. Spaihts ultimately felt that "the origin story of this character, as depicted in the comics, is so operatic and beautiful, and so tragic and epic in its sweep, that it was unavoidable. We had to tell that story, and tell our best version of it." Elements from Spaihts' early drafts that he later stated were still in the final film include many of the film's set pieces, such as the climactic battle, which came straight from Derrickson, as well as "little things" from Spaihts, "like a bandaged hand running down a row of prayer bells in a Nepalese temple." Derrickson wanted Nightmare to be the film's antagonist, along with the concept of "nightmares themselves as being a dimension", but Feige felt "getting across the idea of the Dream Dimension as another dimension" would have been challenging alongside everything else that the film introduces. Dormammu, "the most present villain in the comics", became the film's main villain.

During the early development process, Marvel, Derrickson, and Spaihts all envisioned Benedict Cumberbatch playing the title role. By the end of June, Marvel had reportedly been looking at Tom Hardy and Jared Leto for the film's lead as well, while Édgar Ramírez, who worked with Derrickson on 2014's Deliver Us from Evil, had discussed a possible role with the director. In July, after fans and the media had also championed Cumberbatch for the role of Doctor Strange, the actor explained at the 2014 San Diego Comic-Con that he would be unable to accept the role due to commitments to other projects. Feige stated that a lead actor would be announced "relatively quickly", and by the end of that month Joaquin Phoenix entered talks to play the character.

Marvel Studios was in negotiations by September 2014 to shoot Doctor Strange at Pinewood-Shepperton in England, with crews being assembled for a move into Shepperton Studios in late 2014/early 2015, for filming in May 2015. Negotiations with Phoenix ended in October 2014, as the actor felt that blockbuster films would never be "fulfilling", with "too many requirements that went against [his] instincts for character." Marvel then placed Leto, Ethan Hawke, Oscar Isaac, Ewan McGregor, Matthew McConaughey, Jake Gyllenhaal, Colin Farrell, and Keanu Reeves on their shortlist for the character. Ryan Gosling also had discussions to play the character, while Reeves was not approached about the role, and Cumberbatch was still considered to be in contention. In October, Cumberbatch entered negotiations to play the character, and was officially cast in December. Feige explained that Marvel had kept returning to him for the role while considering other actors, with Derrickson noting that even during discussions with Phoenix, he and Marvel still wanted to cast Cumberbatch in the role. The company eventually decided to change the film's production schedule to fit around Cumberbatch's commitments, allowing him to join the project.

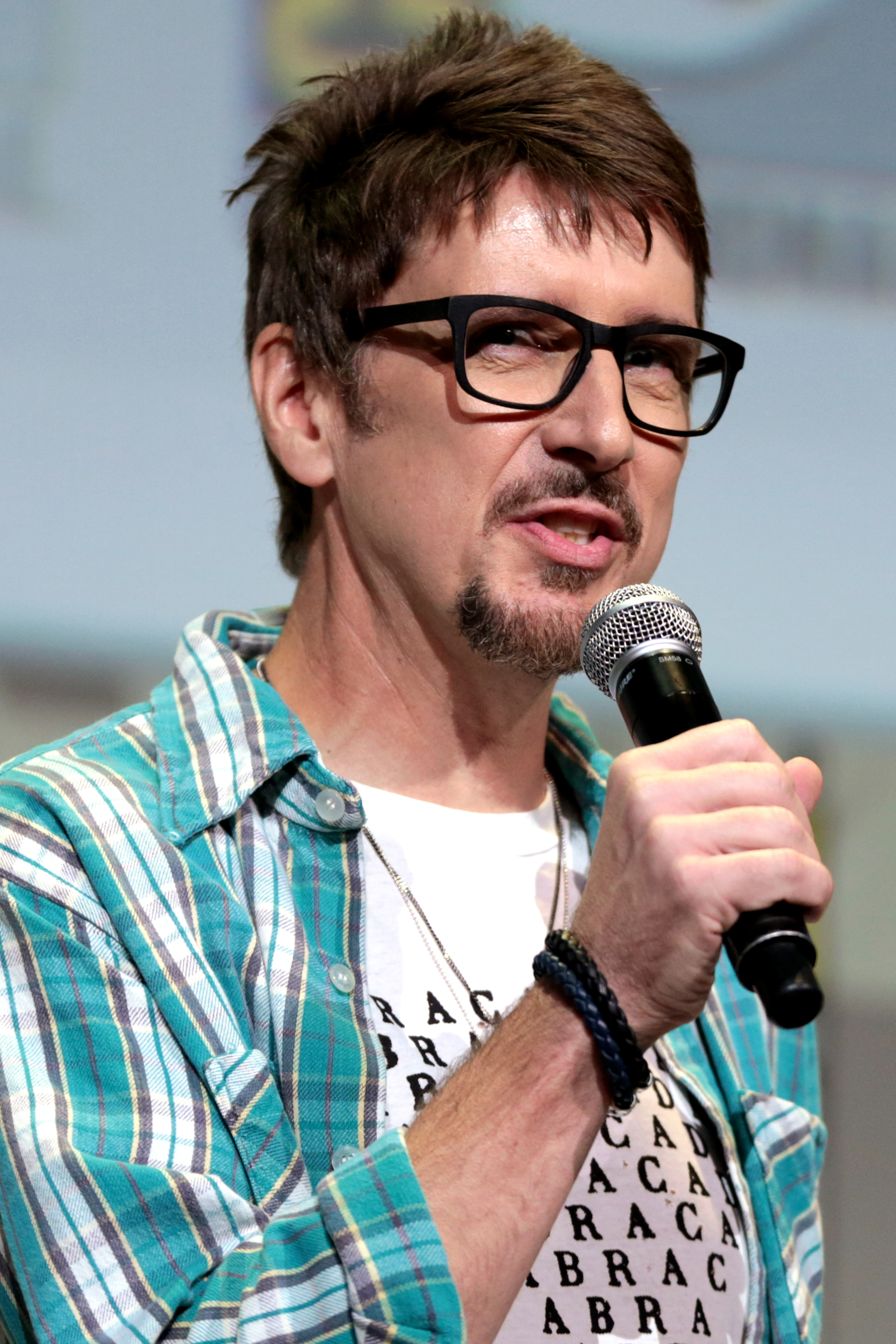
Derrickson promoting Doctor Strange at the 2016 San Diego Comic-Con

With the film's new production schedule, its intended release date was pushed back to November 2016, and Derrickson was able to do some work on the script himself. He brought Cargill in to work with him on this as was originally planned. Describing the film, Cargill called it both a superhero film and a fantasy film, saying "it's a very magical fantasy universe, but at the same time it plays by some of the superhero tropes that people enjoy." Spaihts returned later in the process to "do some more writing and help bring the movie home", and said he was "delighted" by the work that Derrickson and Cargill had done in the interim. Feige and Derrickson have noted that, in addition to The Oath and Steve Ditko's original work on Doctor Strange, an influence on all the film's writers was the Doctor Strange comic book Into Shamballa.

In January 2015, Chiwetel Ejiofor entered preliminary talks with Marvel for a role in the film, later revealed to be Karl Mordo. Ejiofor's role was confirmed during the 2015 D23 Expo. In April, Derrickson and members of the production team visited New York City to scout potential filming locations, while Feige revealed that filming would begin that November. A month later, Tilda Swinton was in talks to play the Ancient One. In June 2015, Derrickson announced that he was going to London to begin work on the film, and Feige confirmed that Strange's Sanctum Sanctorum would appear, located on Bleecker Street in New York City's Greenwich Village, as in the comics. Swinton confirmed her role in the film in July, when Rachel McAdams was being considered for the female lead. McAdams cautioned that "it's still super-early, and I don't know where that's gonna go, if it's gonna go anywhere at all", but she ultimately confirmed her role during the 2015 Toronto International Film Festival. Jessica Chastain had been approached for the role before McAdams, but turned down the opportunity because she felt she was "only going to get one shot at being in a Marvel film" and wanted to be a lead character. Mads Mikkelsen entered into early negotiations to play a villain in August, "one of a number of actors being considered for the unspecified villainous role."

In September 2015, Guardians of the Galaxy director James Gunn stated that many of the crew that worked on that film were unable to return for its sequel, because they had committed to Doctor Strange. Derrickson also revealed that Gunn had provided notes on the script, beyond the general conversing the MCU directors have between themselves for their films. At the end of the month, Feige stated that additional casting announcements would be made "before the end of the year", and by early November, Michael Stuhlbarg entered negotiations to appear in the film as Nicodemus West, a rival of Strange. Derrickson had offered the role to Stuhlbarg because he was interested in working with the actor, and he agreed to join the cast after reading some Doctor Strange comics and being drawn to the character's "guilt-ridden arc" where West "blames himself for ruining the surgery on Strange's hands and robbing him of his ability to operate".

Feige felt that the visuals of the film needed "to be a Ditko/Kubrick/Miyazaki/The Matrix mind-trip", and said that "You don't get into it in Harry Potter, but if a scientist went to Hogwarts he'd find out how some of that stuff is happening! We're not going to spend a lot of time on that, but there will be some of that. And particularly for a character like Strange, who goes from a man of science to a man of faith and who traverses both worlds." In developing the film's magic, Derrickson felt a responsibility to not repeat the representation of magic from previous films, like Fantasia and Harry Potter, wanting "to find a new way to make it feel more tactical and real and surreal. And to root it in gestures as opposed to spoken incantations and things like that." Feige called Doctor Strange the "doorway" into the supernatural side of the MCU, a role that Derrickson noted was also served by the character in the early comics, when the Doctor Strange comics "broke open the Marvel comic book universe into the Marvel multiverse". Discussing the portrayal of other dimensions in the film, Feige stated that it would not explore parallel realities like the comics' "Earth-616 and Earth-617", but would instead feature "dimensions that are so mind-bending that you can barely perceive them", like the Astral plane, Dark Dimension, and Mirror Dimension.

Astrophysicist Adam Frank served as a scientific consultant on the film, having already known Derrickson and been a Marvel fan since childhood. Frank advised on "the human experience of space and time", helping Marvel conceive ideas for their cinematic multiverse, and suggesting dialogue for characters based on their beliefs, whether they were materialist, rationalist, reductionist, or "had this enlarged perspective." He noted that modern movie goers may not necessarily understand these complex scientific ideas, but do appear to appreciate that "amazing things happen from science. So by grounding your stories enough in science to not so much make them plausible, but to allow that science to open up new possibilities—people are used to that in their lives. So I think it makes sense to them, and it's exciting to them". This was an aspect of previous MCU films that Frank called a "great thing ... speaking as a scientist", saying that "they build a coherent and consistent universe that respects the scientific process and that uses enough of real science to make things plausible or build off them."

=== Filming ===
Principal photography began in Nepal on November 4, 2015, under the working title Checkmate. Ben Davis, serving as cinematographer for the film after doing the same on Guardians of the Galaxy and Avengers: Age of Ultron, described Doctor Strange as Marvel's Fantasia, and noted that a lot of previsualization was required to figure out how to shoot the "psychedelic", M. C. Escher-inspired imagery. Davis used the Arri Alexa 65 camera for the film, along with the Arri Alexa XT Plus. Vision Research Phantom Flex 4Ks, which shoot up to 1000 fps, were used for high-speed sequences like Strange's car crash.

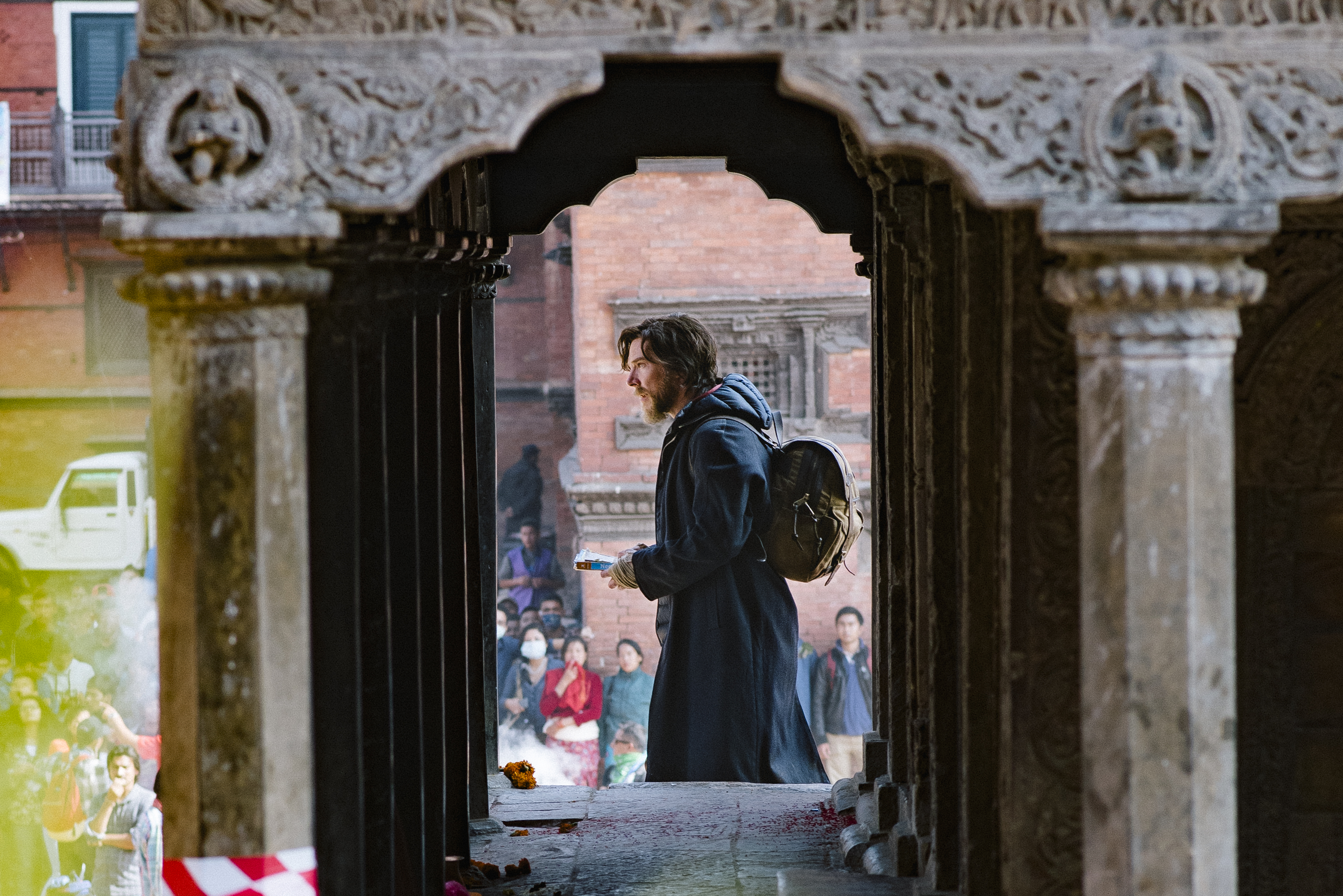
Cumberbatch filming Doctor Strange in Kathmandu, November 2015

Derrickson chose Nepal as a location to feature an "Eastern city" that would not be familiar to most audiences. After scouting and deciding on locations in the country, many of those areas were destroyed by the April 2015 Nepal earthquake. Rather than choosing another country, Derrickson and Cumberbatch felt that bringing attention and tourism to Nepal following the event "was all the more reason to shoot there". Cargill said that the location of Kamar-Taj was shifted from Tibet to Nepal to prevent censorship by the Chinese government. Cumberbatch said that shooting in Nepal was "absolutely vital to this film, I think not least because it's so based in something that is exotic. It was a magical way to start the shoot. It's important to a film like this—which has a profound gearshift into a spiritual and otherworldly dimension—that the portal for that be in a place that actually happens in itself to be incredibly spiritual and marvelous." The eventual filming locations around the Kathmandu Valley included the Pashupatinath and Swayambhunath Temples; Thamel and New Road in Kathmandu; and the Patan Durbar Square in Patan.

Production moved to Longcross Studios in Surrey, England on November 11, and was scheduled to stay there until March 2016. The real Kathmandu street that led into the fictional Kamar-Taj courtyard was replicated at Longcross, which production designer Charles Wood described as "very hard because Kathmandu is a most beautiful city and it's steeped in history. To transition from that level of detail and history, with the shape of the streets, the warping of the buildings, these ancient bricks and these ancient tiles, was a real challenge." For authenticity, the set was dressed with real food, and populated with dogs, pigeons, and Nepalese extras, many of whom were relatives of people who live on the real Kathmandu street. The inside of Kamar-Taj was also constructed at Longcross, with "sculptors creating beautiful columns and wall decorations and craftsmen building screens and doors to evoke the exotic feel of the ancient sanctuary." Wood's goal was to make the set feel like the Ancient One and her disciples actually lived there, and give it a "truly spiritual, truly magical" feel, while integrating it into a real building that the production filmed in Kathmandu. This and the Kathmandu street were two of twenty-one sets that the crew built at Longcross. Others included Doctor Strange's Sanctum Sanctorum, and a Hong Kong street "complete with over 80 neon signs and a giant roof to keep the rain out." Location shooting in Hong Kong was initially planned, but the crew decided to film at Longcross instead after scouting locations and using photos taken in Hong Kong as references to construct the street set. Citypoint on Ropemaker Street, London, doubled as the New York City building where the Ancient One falls to her death.

Filming also took place in New York City's Hell's Kitchen neighborhood. Additional New York City-set scenes were shot at Shepperton Studios, and later in London. By the end of November, the casting of Mikkelsen and Stuhlbarg was confirmed, alongside Amy Landecker and Scott Adkins in unspecified roles. Additionally, Benedict Wong heard about the film from his friend Ejiofor, and sought a role in it himself. He was cast as Wong in January, and immediately joined the production for filming. Lamborghini provided six Huracán LP 610-4s for use in the film, one of which the production wrecked during filming. Lamborghini said that they felt "there are a lot of characteristics of Doctor Strange that are connected with the Lamborghini philosophy." The Lamborghini crash scene was filmed at Northfleet, Kent by the River Thames. Also in January 2016, filming took place at Exeter College, Oxford. The next month, Feige revealed that the film originally had a prologue that took place in CERN, due to the real world research being done at the facility on alternate dimensions and parallel universes. Production moved to New York City's Flatiron District in April, where set photos revealed that Zara Phythian had joined the cast. Principal photography wrapped in New York City on April 3, 2016.

=== Post-production ===
In June 2016, a Diamond Select Toys press release for Doctor Strange toys, in their Marvel Minimates line, named Mikkelsen's character Kaecilius and McAdams' character Christine Palmer. Mikkelsen's role was confirmed in an official tie-in comic for the film, while McAdams' was confirmed at San Diego Comic-Con in 2016. Additionally, Benjamin Bratt was revealed to have been cast as Jonathan Pangborn; Adkins' role was revealed to be Lucian, a follower of Kaecilius; and Landecker's role was later revealed to be anesthesiologist Dr. Bruner. The latter was mostly cut from the film, with Landecker explaining that she had been cast in the small role, for two scenes at the beginning of the film, because Derrickson was a fan of her performance in A Serious Man, which also starred Stuhlbarg. After filming her first scene, in which she assists Strange with a surgery, Landecker asked not to be involved in the other scene because she had no lines for it and was only seen from behind, and instead wished to attend a special premiere at the White House for her series Transparent. The actress believed she was later cut from the first scene, but she is still credited for a brief appearance. Also, Derrickson revealed that Lulu Wilson had been cast as Strange's sister, for a scene depicting her drowning at a young age. The scene had been shot, and Derrickson thought it was "great [as a] self-contained scene", but it "didn't work" with the rest of the film, and was cut.

Also at San Diego Comic-Con, Derrickson noted that there were still "a couple pickup shoots" to do for the film to "clarify the logic". Further content for the film's training sequence was also shot during these reshoots, as early test audiences "loved [the training portion of the film] and wanted more". Wong indicated that the reshoots had been completed in August. Dan Harmon wrote material for these additional scenes, which Derrickson described as "script analysis and dialogue work", not enough to receive credit in the film. Feige said that in addition to any humor that Harmon could add to the film, he was brought on to "give us his opinions on the sci-fi concepts." Before the film's sets were demolished, Thor: Ragnarok director Taika Waititi took advantage by writing and filming a scene featuring Strange meeting Chris Hemsworth's Thor. The scene was for Ragnarok and shot before that film began production. Derrickson and Marvel felt the scene was "kind of perfect" to show Strange joining the wider MCU after his stand alone introduction, and so added it to Doctor Strange as a mid-credits scene. A post-credits scene, directed by Derrickson, teases Mordo's role as an antagonist to Strange in a potential Doctor Strange sequel.

Stan Lee's cameo in the film was directed by Gunn on the set of Guardians of the Galaxy Vol. 2. This was alongside several other Lee cameos, to limit the amount of travel he had to do for the next four MCU films. Gunn contacted Derrickson during the shoot to ensure that the shot matched up with the respective Doctor Strange scene, and "kept throwing lines at" Lee on the day to give Derrickson and Marvel plenty of options to choose from for the film. Additional options Gunn filmed included Lee reading a book and asking a gentleman next to him if he knew what the word excelsior meant; Lee laughing really hard and stating he was laughing for no reason, being "totally crazy"; and Lee laughing hysterically at a Garfield book, noting how the character "HATES Mondays but he LOVES lasagna!". Gunn felt the Garfield option was originally meant to appear in the final version of the film, but ended up being too long for the scene. By October 10, 2016, Derrickson had completed the film.

Feige described the film's use of 3D as serving the storytelling, saying, "hopefully it helps bend people's minds even more than with just the flat screen." He said that "there are sequences of the film that 3D is actually necessary to tell the dimensional story that is happening through visuals". However, he noted that during visual effects reviews for the film it became apparent that these sequences were adversely affecting the story when viewed in 2D, which necessitated adjustments so the sequences would work in all formats. Over one hour of footage in the film was "specially formatted" for IMAX.

==== Visual effects ====
Visual effects for Doctor Strange were provided by Industrial Light & Magic (ILM), Method Studios, Framestore, Lola VFX, Luma Pictures, Rise FX, Crafty Apes, and SPOV, contributing to 1450 effects shots. Previsualization was handled by The Third Floor. All vendors worked on the common magical elements (mandalas, magical runes shields, whips, stalks and aerial 'lily pads', and portals). Visual effects supervisor Stephane Ceretti, who also worked on Guardians of the Galaxy, explained the similarities and differences between the two films, saying, "there's some resemblance in some of the things that we've done. In the same way, it's a totally different world. In [Guardians], it's more sci-fi oriented and crazy colors. More of a comedy kind of take on things as well. This one is a little bit more serious. It's also a little bit more trippy. We use very different techniques, actually. Guardians was also for us a huge animation film. This one was less of it. This one was more about the environments and effects".

Further discussing the film's visuals, Derrickson described influences as "the Steve Ditko, Stan Lee comics [which] were all about these weird visuals", as well as "a fair amount of surrealist art and photography and M. C. Escher". Additional inspiration for the film's visuals came from "a bunch of experimental, fractal videos from YouTube" that Derrickson found, and the mobile video game Monument Valley. Derrickson's "ambition was to use cutting-edge visual effects to do things that are fresh and new—to not just blow things up." Feige explained that one of the more difficult areas to be inventive was the action sequences, as Derrickson did not want them "to simply be: someone shoots a bolt of lightning, and someone blocks a ball of lightning, so someone throws another bolt of lightning..." Instead, they tried to incorporate the use of different dimensions into the action "in the interest of creating a visual tapestry that is totally different in terms of an action scene we've seen in any other movies." On the film's set pieces, Derrickson reiterated that the film's astral fight scene was based on The Oath comic, while adding that the end fight was "an attempt to capture the quality of that artwork" from the original comics, and the mirror dimension chase was an attempt to take the effects of the film Inception (2010) "to the Nth degree and take it way more surreal and way farther. But I certainly owe something to that movie." Specifically for the climax of the film, Derrickson wanted to play on the superhero trope of "a big fight scene where they're tearing up a city, and there's a portal opening up and they have to close it", subverting it by having the villain defeated with an intelligent use of power rather than showing "which CGI thing can hit the other CGI thing harder".

The Manhattan mirror sequence was mostly filmed on green screen (top), with visual effects added by ILM (bottom).

ILM worked on the folding Manhattan mirror sequence—chosen because of their work creating a digital New York for the film The Avengers (2012)—and the time fight sequence in Hong Kong, which consisted of 200 and 150 shots, respectively. They began work on the film 10 months before filming began to plan out the Manhattan sequence; it was mainly CGI, though some New York location shots were used. The sequence was mainly handled by ILM's San Francisco and Vancouver offices. The Hong Kong time sequence was done mainly by ILM's London office. ILM also created digital doubles for many of the actors, which were shared with the other vendors. Method Studios, who worked on the Quantum Realm in the film Ant-Man (2015), worked on the "magical mystery tour" sequence, with Strange hurtling through various dimensions. The sequence was handled by Method's Los Angeles studio, with their Vancouver studio contributing the opening shot of the sequence. The only shot Method did not work on in the sequence was the one that linked to Dormammu, as Luma Pictures assisted in his creation (they handled his other appearances in the film). Method created 7 dimensions for the sequence: the initial wormhole to the "Speaker Cone"; the Bioluminesce world; the fractals of "soft solid" world; a version of the Quantum Realm; Strange falling through his own eye and Cosmic Scream; the Dark Dimension; and the Shape Shifting realm. The Shape Shifting realm originally had Strange morphing and changing shape, but that was ultimately removed as Derrickson felt the audience needed to see Cumberbatch. Method's Vancouver studio created Strange's car crash, the rooftop training, and the sequence in which Strange experiments with time on an apple in the Kamar-Taj library. The car crash blended the high-speed photography and some green screen sequences, with digital assets for both Cumberbatch and the car. In total, Method worked on 270 effects shots.

Framestore was chosen to work on the Cloak of Levitation, due to their work creating Rocket in Guardians of the Galaxy. Ceretti called Cloak's actions "kind of scripted but not as deeply" as the result, and said that during the pre-visualization process "we had a big discussion about the arc of the story of the Cloak in the film". Framestore also worked on environment shots, the Mandelbrot set sequences, high resolution digital doubles, the astral form, and the Crimson Bands of Cyttorak restraint for Kaecilius, totaling over 365 shots. Alexis Wajsbrot, Framestore's CG Supervisor, called the astral form "one of the hardest effects we've had to deal with at Framestore; finding the right balance of a look that was subtle but also beautiful." Lola VFX worked on the Zealots' eyes, supplementing the make-up work with effects based on a geode. They also created digital tears for Kaecilius when he is in the Crimson Bands of Cyttorak. In addition to Dormammu and the Dark Dimension, Luma Pictures also created the first mirror sequence at the beginning of the film.

In creating Dormammu, Ceretti stated that they wanted to avoid the fiery head look from the comics as "it had been done before. The whole idea is he's a character that lives in-between dimensions. He can also take whatever shapes he wants to take. [When he is talking to Strange] you can feel all these ripples in his face and all that stuff... these kind of opening windows to other dimensions, and all the reflective qualities of it. We really wanted to add the evocation of that fire, but we didn't want to do fire so we went for [a] multicolored approach to try and keep the psychedelic [look] of the entire space." On the Dark Dimension, Ceretti said, "We tried to make it alive all the time—the whole idea of the Dark Dimension is that it's a dynamic environment," with the Luma team referencing the Ditko art and a poster that when lit "with a blacklight it becomes very saturated [with] colors, crazy blacklight colors." He continued, "It was all about finding the right balance between all these elements to pay homage to and to tribute the work of Steve Ditko, but to make it more current to the 21st century. If you look at the detail of the shapes that we have in the Dark Dimension, you can almost point to things in the comic books [that] we really tried to be faithful to."

== Music ==
In May 2016, Michael Giacchino revealed that he would score the film. Derrickson called the score "magic in the literal sense of the word," adding Giacchino "is doing what good scorers do, which is he is not just creating music that supports the images, he's adding a third thing to the movie. It becomes something new with his music in there that it didn't have with temp music." The score was recorded at Abbey Road Studios. During a recording session, Paul McCartney heard one of Giacchino's cues being recorded and likened it to the Beatles song "I Am the Walrus". Derrickson, a Bob Dylan fan, looked for a place in the film to include one of his songs, but could not find one. However, he was able to include the song "Interstellar Overdrive" by Pink Floyd. Derrickson had hoped to use either "Interstellar Overdrive" or The Jimi Hendrix Experience's "Are You Experienced?" for the film's credits, but the royalties to use either in the credits were too expensive, resulting in Giacchino creating the track "The Master of the Mystic End Credits". A soundtrack album from Hollywood Records was released digitally on October 21, 2016, with a physical release on November 18, 2016.

== Marketing ==
In August 2015, a concept art trailer narrated by Derrickson was shown at the D23 Expo. The images showed artwork of Cumberbatch in a traditional Doctor Strange outfit from the comics, as well as a rough sequence of the plot, highlighting points such as Strange's car crash, his journey for healing, and fighting Ejiofor as Mordo (before the character was moved away from a villainous role in the film per discussions between Derrickson and the actor). The trailer was met with "a very big reaction from the gathered crowd."

On April 12, 2016, the first teaser trailer for the film debuted on Jimmy Kimmel Live!. Clark Collis of Entertainment Weekly compared the "series of kaleidoscopic, world-bending scenes" featured in the trailer to the film Inception, as did Scott Mendelson of Forbes. Forbes added that the structure of the trailer resembled early marketing for the film Batman Begins. The Hollywood Reporter's Graeme McMillian criticized these similarities, as well as similarities to The Matrix and between Cumberbatch's American accent and that of Hugh Laurie's Gregory House from House, calling them not "necessarily a real problem, of course ... [but] there's nothing there outside the derivative aspects: due to the nature of the trailer, there's no story beyond the 'white man finds enlightenment in Asia' trope and barely any dialogue to let audiences decide that maybe the performances will elevate the material." McMillian did enjoy the visual effects and the visual of "Tilda Swinton literally knock[ing] Benedict Cumberbatch's soul out of his body," but concluded, "as an introduction to not only a brand new franchise for Marvel, but a potential new genre, this feels far less bold and assured" than the first trailer for Guardians of the Galaxy.

In July 2016, Marvel Comics released a prelude tie-in comic written by Will Corona Pilgrim, with art by Jorge Fornés. The issue sees four Masters of the Mystic Arts–Kaecilius, Wong, Tina Minoru and Daniel Drumm–pursue a woman who has stolen a mystical relic. A second issue, centered on the Ancient One training apprentices in the magical arts at Kamar-Taj, was released a month later. Derrickson, Cumberbatch, Swinton, Ejiofor, McAdams, Mikkelsen, and Wong attended San Diego Comic-Con 2016, where they debuted an exclusive clip and the second trailer for the film. The next month, the same Comic-Con clip was screened at the Asia Pop Comic Convention Manila. In September 2016, an additional prelude comic was released, centered on Kaecilius, while behind the scenes footage was released as a special feature on the Captain America: Civil War Blu-ray. Also in September, Marvel, in partnership with Dolby Laboratories, Broadcom, Synchrony Bank, and Society for Science & the Public, announced "The Magic of STEM Challenge", aimed at females aged 15 through 18 in STEM fields. The challenge was for contestants to submit videos of them finding mentors to explore ideas once thought to only be possible with magic. Five winners would attend the world premiere of the film, and receive a tour of Walt Disney Studios, as well as a $1,000 saving account from Synchrony Bank, with one grand prize winner receiving a mentorship with Walt Disney Studio's Digital Team.

On October 10, 2016, approximately 15 minutes of footage was screened at 115 IMAX 3D locations in North America, and select 3D and IMAX 3D locations worldwide. Fans attending the event received an exclusive IMAX poster for the film. Umberto Gonzales of TheWrap called the footage "stunning to behold". He added that a sequence shown in which the Ancient One sends Strange "on his first trippy tour through the multiverse" was "where the IMAX 3D really shines. The audience is given an incredible visual tour of the multiverse which features other dimensions and other realities. It really is something to behold in IMAX 3D," concluding that "after being shown only 15 minutes of incredible preview footage, IMAX 3D is the definitive format to see the film." Britt Hayes for ScreenCrush felt the footage was "dizzying" and "far weirder and wilder than [the] trailers are letting on," though felt it was a bit difficult "to judge some of what was shown out of context (especially earlier scenes)". Regarding the same sequence where the Ancient One sends Strange through the multiverse, Hayes said, "Seth Rogen's comedic drug trip sequences have nothing on the psychedelic visuals employed here. It's astounding, elaborate stuff, and easily provides the most entertaining moments in the footage." IGN's Terri Schwartz said the sequences shown were where "Derrickson's horror aesthetics shine through".

Marvel provided Twitter stickers, Giphy content, Facebook Live, Snapchat lenses and filter, Tumblr stunts, and Instagram special content related to the film. Additionally, Microsoft Surface had a promotional sponsorship of the film, due to the use of the device in the filmmaking process. A partnership with Google's Tilt Brush app featured a "Mixed Reality" "stunt with artists across Los Angeles, London, and Hong Kong, inspired by different dimensions in Doctor Strange and recreating the worlds in VR for an immersive visual experience.

== Release ==
=== Theatrical ===
Doctor Strange held its world premiere in Hong Kong on October 13, 2016, and had its premiere in Hollywood, Los Angeles, at the TCL Chinese Theatre and El Capitan Theatre on October 20, 2016. The film was released in the United Kingdom on October 25, 2016, alongside a total of 33 markets in its first weekend, with 213 IMAX screens in 32 of those markets. It was screened at the EW PopFest on October 28, 2016, in Los Angeles. Doctor Strange's North America release on November 4 took place in 3,882 venues, of which 3,530 were in 3D, along with 379 IMAX theaters, 516 premium large-format (Disney's biggest release in that format to date), and 189 D-Box locations. Overall, Doctor Strange had the widest IMAX release ever globally, along with being the first film to release on more than 1,000 IMAX screens. It was previously reported to have been scheduled for a July 8, 2016, release, before the production schedule shifted to accommodate Cumberbatch's other commitments. Doctor Strange is part of Phase Three of the MCU.

=== Home media ===
Doctor Strange was released on digital download by Walt Disney Studios Home Entertainment on February 14, 2017, and on Blu-ray, Blu-ray 3D and DVD on February 28, 2017. The digital and Blu-ray releases include behind-the-scenes featurettes; audio commentary; deleted scenes; a blooper reel; an exclusive preview of the Phase Three films Guardians of the Galaxy Vol. 2, Thor: Ragnarok, Black Panther, and Avengers: Infinity War; and Team Thor: Part 2, a continuation of the "mockumentary" short film Team Thor, that was directed by Waititi. Best Buy released an exclusive collector's edition SteelBook case for the regular and 3D Blu-ray release, featuring art based on the Book of Cagliostro and the Eye of Agamotto. Target's Blu-ray versions have an additional exclusive featurette, while the digital version also features an exclusive featurette. The IMAX Enhanced version of the film was made available on Disney+ beginning on November 12, 2021.

== Reception ==
=== Box office ===
Doctor Strange grossed $232.6 million in the United States and Canada and $445.2 million in other territories, for a worldwide total of $677.8 million. The film became the biggest IMAX opening in November domestically ($12.2 million), internationally ($24 million), and globally ($24.2 million), overtaking Interstellar's records. By November 27, 2016, the film had become the biggest single-character introduction film in the MCU. Deadline Hollywood calculated the film's net profit as $122.65 million, accounting for production budgets, marketing, talent participations, and other costs; box office grosses and home media revenues placed it 11th on their list of 2016's "Most Valuable Blockbusters".

Doctor Strange earned $32.6 million on its opening day in the United States and Canada, including Thursday previews, with a total weekend gross of $85.1 million; IMAX contributed $12.2 million to the opening weekend gross, with 3D contributing $24 million. The film was the number one film for the weekend, and became the second largest opening in November for Disney. Initial projections for the film in late August 2016 had it earning as low as $50 million to as high as $88 million in its opening weekend, with projections revised to $65–75 million closer to the film's release. Doctor Strange remained the top film in its second weekend, and fell to second in its third, behind Fantastic Beasts and Where to Find Them. In its fourth weekend, Doctor Strange was the third highest-grossing film, behind Fantastic Beasts and Moana. It fell to fifth in its fifth and sixth weekends, and by its seventh weekend had fallen to the ninth-highest-grossing place. It was projected to earn $255 million for its total domestic gross.

Outside the United States and Canada, Doctor Strange earned $87.7 million in its first weekend from 33 markets, becoming the top film in all markets except Lithuania and Finland. South Korea was the top market overall with $18.1 million, locally the biggest opening weekend ever for an original Marvel release, along with an all-time best opening for an IMAX film. IMAX garnered a record $7.8 million, the best international IMAX debut for a film in the month of October, with Russia seeing its biggest Saturday IMAX gross for a Marvel film. Additionally, Hong Kong ($3.2 million), Thailand ($2.5 million), Malaysia ($2.4 million), and Singapore ($2.2 million) also had the biggest opening weekend ever for an original Marvel film. In its second weekend, the film opened in 22 additional markets, becoming the top film in China with $44.4 million, the highest 3-day opening weekend for a first installment superhero film there. China's opening was also the third highest for an MCU film, behind Avengers: Age of Ultron and Captain America: Civil War, as well as the best 3-day opening for an IMAX film in November with $6.3 million. IMAX also set November opening records in India, Chile, Colombia and Ecuador. Brazil was also a top market, earning $7.9 million.

Doctor Strange remained the number one film in its third weekend for the third consecutive week in Denmark, the Netherlands, the United Kingdom, Australia, Hong Kong, South Korea, Malaysia, New Zealand, and Singapore, and number one for the second week in China and Russia. It also became the highest-grossing original MCU release in India, Hong Kong, South Korea, the Philippines, Singapore, Thailand and Vietnam. Its fourth weekend saw China's total gross surpass $100 million, "an increasingly rare feat in 2016." The next weekend, Doctor Strange opened in Argentina, where it was the number one film and earned $1 million. The film's fourteenth weekend saw it open in Japan, where it was number one with $4.5 million. As of December 4, 2016, the film's largest markets were China ($110.3 million), South Korea ($41.3 million), and the United Kingdom and Ireland ($27.9 million).

=== Critical response ===
The review aggregator Rotten Tomatoes reported an approval rating of 89%, with an average score of 7.3/10, based on 385 reviews. The website's critical consensus reads, "Doctor Strange artfully balances its outré source material against the blockbuster constraints of the MCU, delivering a thoroughly entertaining superhero origin story in the bargain." On Metacritic, the film holds a score of 72 out of 100, based on reviews from 49 critics, indicating "generally favorable" reviews. Audiences polled by CinemaScore gave the film an average grade of "A" on an A+ to F scale, while PostTrak reported filmgoers gave it a 91% overall positive score and a 73% "definite recommend".

The Hollywood Reporter's Todd McCarthy called Doctor Strange "an engaging, smartly cast and sporadically eye-popping addition" to the franchise, adding "this action movie ostensibly rooted in the mind-expanding tenets of Eastern mysticism is different enough to establish a solid niche alongside the blockbuster combine's established money machines." McCarthy, in addition to praising the acting, felt that there were certain sequences that "go far beyond [Inception] in visual spectacle" and that the time manipulation sequences, "seen to outstanding advantage in 3D, [were what] mind-trip-seeking audiences back in Doctor Strange's origin days would have called 'far-out' but today's fans will simply deem 'amazing'." Peter Debruge of Variety called the film "Marvel's most satisfying entry since Spider-Man 2," and wrote that despite having "the same look, feel, and fancy corporate sheen" as the other MCU films, it "boasts an underlying originality and freshness missing from the increasingly cookie-cutter comic-book realm of late." Debruge also praised the casting along with the multitude of visual effects the film was able to achieve.

Alonso Duralde, reviewing for TheWrap said, "True, Doctor Strange is an origin story, and occasionally hemmed in by the genre's narrative requirements, but it's smart enough to bring in great British actors to make the predictable paces and life lessons feel fresh and fascinating." Regarding the film's visuals, Duralde praised them, exclaiming, "In a year where bloated, empty spectacles have induced a crushing level of CG fatigue, this funny, freaky adventure reminds us of how effective VFX can be when they've got some imagination behind them." Manohla Dargis of The New York Times said, "The giddily enjoyable Doctor Strange ... is part of Marvel's strategy for world domination, yet it's also so visually transfixing, so beautiful and nimble that you may even briefly forget the brand." Justin Chang of the Los Angeles Times said, "Within the familiar narrative contours of the origin story, writer-director Scott Derrickson crams in enough out-of-body experiences, spatial-temporal shenanigans and dazzlingly kaleidoscopic visuals to make you wonder if he and his co-writers ... were dropping acid behind the scenes."

Conversely, Angelica Jade Bastién, writing for RogerEbert.com, said, "For all of its wondrous world-building and trippy effects, Doctor Strange isn't the evolutionary step forward for Marvel that it needs to be storytelling-wise. Underneath all of its improvements, the core narrative is something we've seen countless times." Mara Reinstein of US Weekly called the film "joyless" and wrote, "Despite [Benedict Cumberbatch's] alluring powers, he can't save an overly convoluted film that relies on a galaxy of derivative 3-D special-effect tricks... Nobody is having much fun here – save for the doctor's Cloak of Levitation that has its own devilish personality and can whisk him out of scary situations." Rex Reed of The New York Observer called Doctor Strange "an awkwardly cliché-riddled mix of hamstrung imagination and bizarro reality" and said, "None of it makes any sense... For characterization, dialogue, narrative arc, acceptable acting and coherence, go elsewhere." Adam Graham of The Detroit News said, "Cumberbatch is wildly charismatic in the lead role... But that's the thing: He's a better party guest than he is a host. Doctor Strange is a fine introduction, but by the end, you're not sad to be headed for the door."

=== Accolades ===
Year	Award	Category	Recipient(s)	Result	Ref(s)
2016	Evening Standard British Film Awards	Best Actor	Benedict Cumberbatch	Nominated	
2016	Evening Standard British Film Awards	Best Supporting Actor	Chiwetel Ejiofor	Nominated	
2016	Hollywood Film Awards	Hollywood Visual Effects Award	Stephane Ceretti and Richard Bluff	Won	
2016	Hollywood Music in Media Awards	Best Original Score – Sci-Fi/Fantasy Film	Michael Giacchino	Nominated	
2016	Critics' Choice Awards	Best Hair and Makeup	Doctor Strange	Nominated	
2016	Critics' Choice Awards	Best Visual Effects	Doctor Strange	Nominated	
2016	Critics' Choice Awards	Best Action Movie	Doctor Strange	Nominated	
2016	Critics' Choice Awards	Best Actor in an Action Movie	Benedict Cumberbatch	Nominated	
2016	Critics' Choice Awards	Best Actress in an Action Movie	Tilda Swinton	Nominated	
2016	Critics' Choice Awards	Best Sci-Fi/Horror Movie	Doctor Strange	Nominated	
2016	San Diego Film Critics Society	Best Visual Effects	Doctor Strange	Nominated	
2016	St. Louis Gateway Film Critics Association	Best Action Film	Doctor Strange	Nominated	
2016	St. Louis Gateway Film Critics Association	Best Horror / Science-Fiction Film	Doctor Strange	Nominated	
2016	St. Louis Gateway Film Critics Association	Best Visual Effects	Doctor Strange	Nominated	
2016	Florida Film Critics' Circle	Best Visual Effects	Doctor Strange	Nominated	
2017	Houston Film Critics Society	Technical Achievement	Doctor Strange	Nominated	
2017	People's Choice Awards	Favorite Year End Blockbuster	Doctor Strange	Nominated	
2017	Screen Actors Guild Awards	Outstanding Performance by a Stunt Ensemble in a Motion Picture	Doctor Strange	Nominated	
2017	Annie Awards	Outstanding Achievement, Animated Effects in a Live Action Production	Georg Kaltenbrunner, Michael Marcuzzi, Thomas Bevan, Andrew Graham and Jihyun Yoon	Won	
2017	Visual Effects Society Awards	Outstanding Visual Effects in a Photoreal Feature	Stephane Ceretti, Susan Pickett, Richard Bluff, Vincent Cirelli, Paul Corbould	Nominated	
2017	Visual Effects Society Awards	Outstanding Created Environment in a Photoreal Feature	London – Brendan Seals, Raphael A. Pimentel, Andrew Zink, Gregory Ng	Nominated	
2017	Visual Effects Society Awards	Outstanding Created Environment in a Photoreal Feature	New York City – Adam Watkins, Martijn van Herk, Tim Belsher, Jon Mitchell	Won	
2017	Visual Effects Society Awards	Outstanding Virtual Cinematography in a Photoreal Project	New York Mirror Dimension – Landis Fields, Mathew Cowie, Frederic Medioni, Faraz Hameed	Nominated	
2017	Visual Effects Society Awards	Outstanding Effects Simulations in a Photoreal Feature	Hong Kong Reverse Destruction – Florian Witzel, Georges Nakhle, Azhul Mohamed, David Kirchner	Nominated	
2017	Visual Effects Society Awards	Outstanding Compositing in a Photoreal Feature	New York City – Matthew Lane, Jose Fernandez, Ziad Shureih, Amy Shepard	Nominated	
2017	Art Directors Guild Awards	Excellence in Production Design for a Fantasy Film	Charles Wood	Nominated	
2017	British Academy Film Awards	Best Makeup and Hair	Jeremy Woodhead	Nominated	
2017	British Academy Film Awards	Best Production Design	Charles Wood and John Bush	Nominated	
2017	British Academy Film Awards	Best Special Visual Effects	Richard Bluff, Stephane Ceretti, Paul Corbould, and Jonathan Fawkner	Nominated	
2017	Cinema Audio Society Awards	Motion Picture – Live Action	Doctor Strange	Nominated	
2017	Costume Designers Guild Awards	Excellence in Fantasy Film	Alexandra Byrne	Won	
2017	Make-Up Artists and Hair Stylists Guild	Feature-Length Motion Picture – Best Period and/or Character Make-Up	Jeremy Woodhead	Nominated	
2017	Make-Up Artists and Hair Stylists Guild	Feature-Length Motion Picture – Best Special Make-Up Effects	Jeremy Woodhead	Nominated	
2017	Satellite Awards	Best Visual Effects	Doctor Strange	Nominated	
2017	Satellite Awards	Best Costume Design	Alexandra Byrne	Nominated	
2017	Academy Awards	Best Visual Effects	Stephane Ceretti, Richard Bluff, Vincent Cirelli and Paul Corbould	Nominated	
2017	Empire Awards	Best Sci-Fi/Fantasy	Doctor Strange	Nominated	
2017	Empire Awards	Best Actor	Benedict Cumberbatch	Nominated	
2017	Empire Awards	Best Costume Design	Doctor Strange	Nominated	
2017	Empire Awards	Best Visual Effects	Doctor Strange	Won	
2017	Empire Awards	Best Production Design	Doctor Strange	Nominated	
2017	Nebula Awards	Ray Bradbury Award for Outstanding Dramatic Presentation	Doctor Strange	Nominated	
2017	Saturn Awards	Best Comic-to-Film Motion Picture	Doctor Strange	Won	
2017	Saturn Awards	Best Director	Scott Derrickson	Nominated	
2017	Saturn Awards	Best Actor	Benedict Cumberbatch	Nominated	
2017	Saturn Awards	Best Supporting Actress	Tilda Swinton	Won	
2017	Saturn Awards	Best Film Screenplay	Jon Spaihts, Scott Derrickson, and C. Robert Cargill	Nominated	
2017	Saturn Awards	Best Production Design	Charles Wood	Nominated	
2017	Saturn Awards	Best Music	Michael Giacchino	Nominated	
2017	Saturn Awards	Best Costume Design	Alexander Byrne	Nominated	
2017	Saturn Awards	Best Make-Up	Jeremy Whitewood	Nominated	
2017	Saturn Awards	Best Special / Visual Effects	Stephane Ceretti, Richard Bluff, Vincent Cirelli, and Paul Corbould	Nominated	
2017	Teen Choice Awards	Choice Fantasy Movie	Doctor Strange	Nominated	
2017	Teen Choice Awards	Choice Fantasy Actor	Benedict Cumberbatch	Nominated	
2017	Teen Choice Awards	Choice Fantasy Actress	Rachel McAdams	Nominated	
2017	Dragon Awards	Best Science Fiction or Fantasy Movie	Doctor Strange	Nominated	
2017	AACTA Awards	Best Visual Effects or Animation	Brendan Seals, Steven Swanson, Raphael A. Pimentel, Andrew Zink	Nominated	

== Sequel ==
Doctor Strange in the Multiverse of Madness was released on May 6, 2022. Sam Raimi replaced Derrickson as director, with a script written by Michael Waldron. Cumberbatch, Wong, Ejiofor, and McAdams reprised their roles, with Elizabeth Olsen also reprising her role of Wanda Maximoff / Scarlet Witch from other MCU media.

== See also ==
- List of films featuring time loops
- Whitewashing in film
- "What If... Doctor Strange Lost His Heart Instead of His Hands?", an episode of the MCU television series What If...? that reimagines the events of this film
