= Carmignani =

Carmignani is an Italian surname. Notable people with the surname include:

- Giulio Carmignani (1813–1890), Italian landscape painter
- Pietro Carmignani (born 1945), Italian footballer and coach
