= Saturn Award for Best Comic-to-Film Motion Picture =

Annual US film award

- Awarded for: Best motion picture of the year adapted from a comic book
- Country: United States
- Presented by: Academy of Science Fiction, Fantasy and Horror Films
- First award: 2013
- Currently held by: Guardians of the Galaxy Vol. 3 (2022/2023)
- Website: www.saturnawards.org

The Saturn Award for Best Comic-to-Film Motion Picture was one of the annual awards given by the American professional organization, the Academy of Science Fiction, Fantasy and Horror Films. The Saturn Awards, which are the oldest film-specialized awards to reward science fiction, fantasy, and horror achievements (the Hugo Award for Best Dramatic Presentation, awarded by the World Science Fiction Society who reward science fiction and fantasy in various media, is the oldest award for science fiction and fantasy films), included the category for the first time for the 2013 film year to specifically reward comic book adaptations in film, which were previously rewarded in categories such as Fantasy or Science Fiction.

== Winners and nominees ==
=== 2010s ===
Year	Film
2013 (40th)	Iron Man 3
2013 (40th)	Man of Steel
2013 (40th)	Thor: The Dark World
2013 (40th)	The Wolverine
2014 (41st)	Guardians of the Galaxy
2014 (41st)	The Amazing Spider-Man 2
2014 (41st)	Captain America: The Winter Soldier
2014 (41st)	X-Men: Days of Future Past
2015 (42nd)	Ant-Man
2015 (42nd)	Attack on Titan: Part 1
2015 (42nd)	Avengers: Age of Ultron
2015 (42nd)	Kingsman: The Secret Service
2015 (42nd)	The Peanuts Movie
2016 (43rd)	Doctor Strange
2016 (43rd)	Batman v Superman: Dawn of Justice
2016 (43rd)	Captain America: Civil War
2016 (43rd)	Deadpool
2016 (43rd)	Suicide Squad
2016 (43rd)	X-Men: Apocalypse
2017 (44th)	Black Panther
2017 (44th)	Guardians of the Galaxy Vol. 2
2017 (44th)	Logan
2017 (44th)	Spider-Man: Homecoming
2017 (44th)	Thor: Ragnarok
2017 (44th)	Wonder Woman
2018/2019 (45th)	Avengers: Endgame
2018/2019 (45th)	Aquaman
2018/2019 (45th)	Avengers: Infinity War
2018/2019 (45th)	Captain Marvel
2018/2019 (45th)	Shazam!
2018/2019 (45th)	Spider-Man: Far From Home
2018/2019 (45th)	Spider-Man: Into the Spider-Verse
2019/2020 (46th)	Joker
2019/2020 (46th)	Birds of Prey
2019/2020 (46th)	Bloodshot
2019/2020 (46th)	The New Mutants
2019/2020 (46th)	The Old Guard

=== 2020s ===
Year	Film
2021/2022 (50th)	Spider-Man: No Way Home
2021/2022 (50th)	The Batman
2021/2022 (50th)	Doctor Strange in the Multiverse of Madness
2021/2022 (50th)	Shang-Chi and the Legend of the Ten Rings
2021/2022 (50th)	The Suicide Squad
2021/2022 (50th)	Thor: Love and Thunder
2022/2023 (51st)	Guardians of the Galaxy Vol. 3
2022/2023 (51st)	Ant-Man and the Wasp: Quantumania
2022/2023 (51st)	Black Panther: Wakanda Forever
2022/2023 (51st)	Blue Beetle
2022/2023 (51st)	The Flash

== Summary ==
=== Multiple wins ===
8 wins

- MCU

2 wins

- Guardians of the Galaxy

=== Nominations ===
==== By publisher ====
Through the 2022/2023 Saturn Awards:

32 nominations were for characters from Marvel Comics, including 23 in the MCU, 2 Spider-Man films outside the MCU, 6 X-Men films, and Kingsman: The Secret Service (which has been published by Marvel Comics, Image Comics, and Dark Horse Comics).

12 nominations were for characters from DC Comics, including 10 in the DCEU and 2 films outside the DCEU.

The remaining 4 nominations were 1 each for Attack on Titan from Kodansha (the only nominee to be based on a manga), Bloodshot from Valiant Comics, The Old Guard from Image Comics, and The Peanuts Movie.

==== Multiple nominations by character ====
6 nominations

- X-Men

5 nominations

- Spider-Man (including 3 in the MCU, and 2 outside the MCU)

3 nominations

- Batman
- Guardians of the Galaxy
- Thor

2 nominations

- Ant Man
- Black Panther
- Captain America
- Wolverine Trilogy
