= Stéphane Ceretti =

French visual effects supervisor

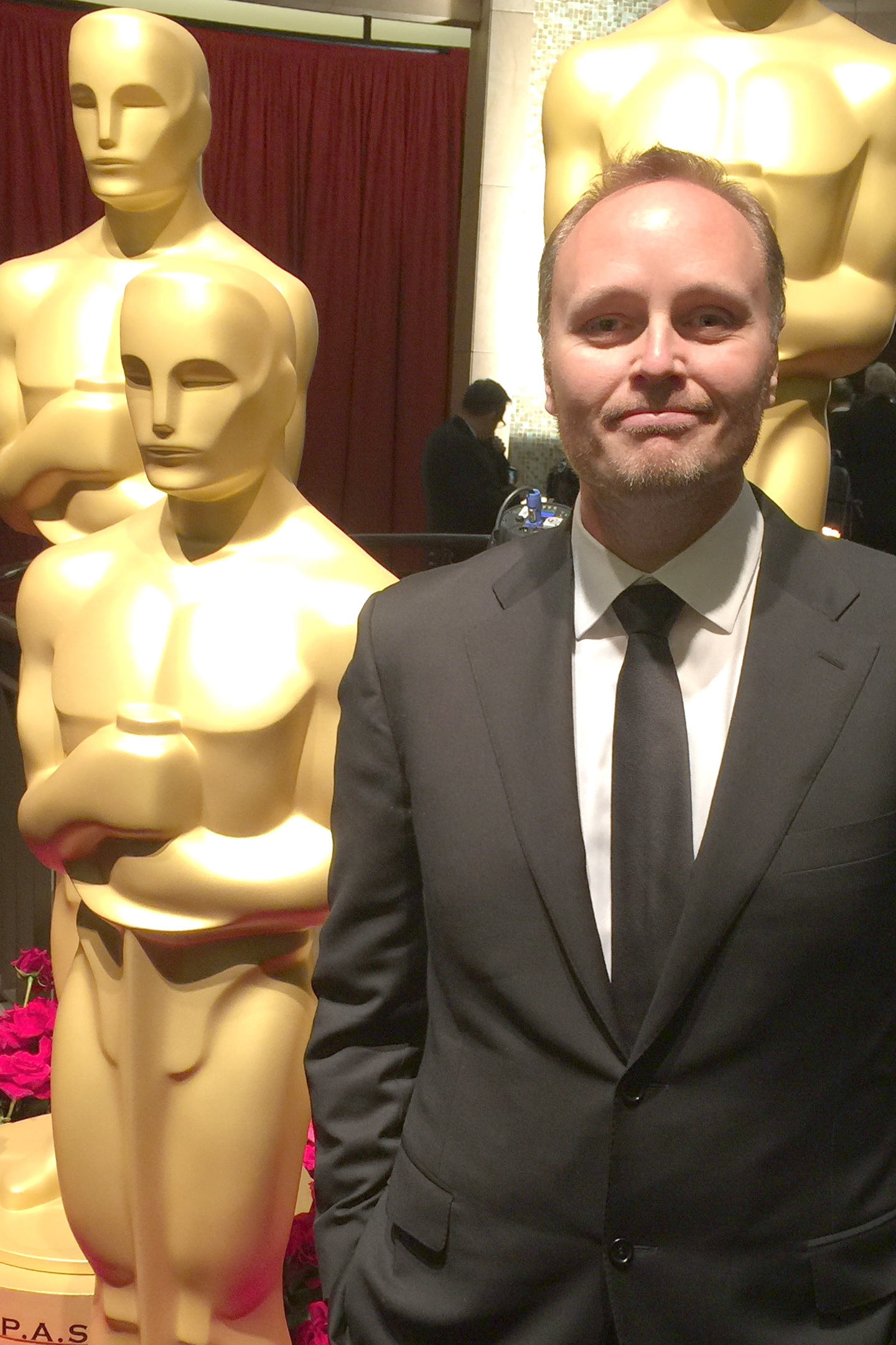
- Ceretti at the 2015 Oscars
- Born: September 24, 1973 (age 53); France
- Occupation: Visual effects supervisor
- Years active: 1996-present

Stéphane Ceretti (born 24 September 1973) is a French visual effects supervisor.

== Career ==
Stéphane Ceretti began his career as an animator later transferring over to a VFX supervisor at BUF Compagnie in Paris. He moved to London, UK in 2008 where he worked at Moving Picture Company and Method Studios.

In 2013, Ceretti moved to Los Angeles where he now lives and works. In 2014, he worked on Guardians of the Galaxy as the Marvel Visual Effects Supervisor. He was nominated alongside Nicolas Aithadi, Jonathan Fawkner and Paul Corbould at the 87th Academy Awards and at the 68th British Academy Film Awards for Special Visual Effects.

In 2016, he worked on Doctor Strange as the Marvel Visual Effects Supervisor. Nominated alongside Richard Bluff, Vincent Cirelli and Paul Corbould at the 89th Academy Awards for Best Achievement in Visual Effects and at the 70th British Academy Film Awards for Special Visual Effects.

In 2017, Ceretti directed and co-produced with Nhut Le a short "Comfort". The short earned an Award of Merit at the Best Shorts competition in September 2017.

In 2018, Ceretti worked on Ant-Man and the Wasp as the Marvel Visual Effects Supervisor in 2019. Additionally he was Visual Effects Supervisor for the additional second unit on Avengers: Endgame alongside Jesse James Chisholm.

In 2019–2020, Ceretti worked on Eternals as Visual Effects Supervisor.

From Summer 2021 to 2023, Ceretti worked on Guardians of the Galaxy Vol. 3 as Visual Effect Supervisor. He also worked on the Guardians of the Galaxy Holiday Special, a 42 minute show released on Disney+ in November 2022.

In 2024-2025, Ceretti supervised the effects on Superman for which they were nominated for multiple awards including the Critics' Choice Movie Awards.

In January 2026, Ceretti went back to Atlanta for Man of Tomorrow, the follow-up to the superman movie.

== Filmography ==
Year	Title	Director	Roles	Other notes
1997	Batman & Robin	Joel Schumacher	Animator: BUF	
1998	The Visitors II: The Corridors of Time	Jean-Marie Poiré	Visual Effects: BUF Compagnie	
2000	The Cell	Tarsem Singh	CG Supervisor: BUF	
2002	S1m0ne	Andrew Niccol	Digital Artist: BUF Compagnie	
2003	The Matrix Reloaded	The Wachowskis	Visual Effects Supervisor: BUF	1st of 3 collaborations with the Wachowskis
2003	The Matrix Revolutions	The Wachowskis	Visual Effects Supervisor: BUF	
2004	Alexander	Oliver Stone	Visual Effects Supervisor: BUF	
2005	Batman Begins	Christopher Nolan	Visual Effects Supervisor: BUF	1st of 2 collaborations with Nolan
2005	Harry Potter and the Goblet of Fire	Mike Newell	Visual Effects: BUF	1st of 2 collaborations with Newell
2005	Angel-A	Luc Besson	Digital Compositor: BUF	
2006	Silent Hill	Christophe Gans	Visual Effects Supervisor: BUF	
2006	The Prestige	Christopher Nolan	Visual Effects Supervisor: BUF	
2007	J'attends quelqu'un	Jérôme Bonnell	Visual Effects	
2008	Babylon A.D.	Mathieu Kassovitz	Visual Effects Supervisor: BUF	
2010	Prince of Persia: The Sands of Time	Mike Newell	Visual Effects Supervisor: MPC	1st of 2 collaborations with producer Jerry Bruckheimer
2010	The Sorcerer's Apprentice	Jon Turteltaub	Visual Effects: Method	
2011	X-Men: First Class	Matthew Vaughn	Production Additional Visual Effects Supervisor	
2011	Captain America: The First Avenger	Joe Johnston	Additional Visual Effects Supervisor: 2nd Unit	1st of 9 collaborations with Marvel Studios
2012	Cloud Atlas	The Wachowskis, Tom Tykwer	Production Visual Effects Supervisor	
2013	Thor: The Dark World	Alan Taylor	2nd Unit Visual Effects Supervisor	
2014	Guardians of the Galaxy	James Gunn	Production Visual Effects Supervisor	1st of 4 collaborations with Gunn; Nominated - Academy Award for Best Visual Effects With Nicolas Aithadi, Jonathan Fawkner and Paul Corbould
2016	Doctor Strange	Scott Derrickson	Production Visual Effects Supervisor	Nominated - Academy Award for Best Visual Effects With Richard Bluff, Vincent Cirelli and Paul Corbould
2018	Ant-Man and the Wasp	Peyton Reed	Production Visual Effects Supervisor	
2019	Avengers: Endgame	Anthony and Joe Russo	Visual Effects Supervisor: Additional 2nd Unit	With Jesse James Chisholm
2019	El Camino: A Breaking Bad Movie	Vince Gilligan	Production Visual Effects Consultant	
2020	Nomadland	Chloe Zhao	Production Visual Effects Consultant	1st of 2 collaborations with Zhao
2021	Eternals	Chloe Zhao	Production Visual Effects Supervisor	
2022	The Guardians of the Galaxy Holiday Special	James Gunn	Production Visual Effects Supervisor	
2023	Guardians of the Galaxy Vol. 3	James Gunn	Production Visual Effects Supervisor	Nominated for Academy Award for Best Visual Effects. With Alexis Wajsbrot, Guy Williams, and Theo Bialek.
2025	Superman	James Gunn	Production Visual Effects Supervisor	
2027	Man of Tomorrow	James Gunn	Production Visual Effects Supervisor	
