= Ceretto =

Ceretto may refer to:

- Ceretto Lomellina, municipality in the Province of Pavia in the Italian region Lombardy
- John Ceretto (1898–1978), American politician

== See also ==
- Ceretti
