= Jean Jérôme =

French communist activist and Resistance member

Jean Jérôme (1906–1990) was a French communist activist and Resistance member. Born as Michał Feintuch (in French Mikhaël or Michel), he took the pseudonym Jean Jérôme in 1940, until his death.

== Biography ==
Born in Solotvyn, Galicia (part of Austria-Hungary) as one of the seven children of a vendor, he received a religious education in the local yeshiva (Jewish school), and spoke both Hebrew and Yiddish. He started work in menial jobs at a very young age, and he became a communist after Galicia was taken over by Poland at the end of World War I. Feintuch attended meetings of the newly formed and clandestine Communist Party of Poland at the age of sixteen, and he joined a trade union. After two successive arrests, he could no longer find employment, and he ultimately fled Poland in order to elude military service.

He lived in Belgium after 1927, working in a steel plant. He also attended lectures at the University of Liège at about the same time. His political activities caused his expulsion, so he illegally crossed into France to work as an electrician in a telephone factory. He became active in the Confédération Générale du Travail (CGT-F) and the Polish mission of the Main-d'œuvre étrangère (Foreign Workers Movement) to the Central Committee of the French Communist Party (PCF). In 1931, he was deported to Belgium, but returned once more to become active in the Paris region, remaining a clandestine operative for several years thereafter.

Feintuch became an important internal contact for the Comintern and Profintern; he established a relationship with the Comintern's envoy to France, Eugen Fried, and he was one in the Party section charged with sending weapons and supplies to the Republicans during the Spanish Civil War. After the Spanish Popular Front was crushed in 1939, Mikhaël Feintuch and his section were directed to organize the transit of tens of thousands of former fighters and other refugees into France. He also, probably, engaged in the trafficking of jewels and gold.

In June 1940, his central position in the Party was confirmed by Jacques Duclos. Feintuch, newly named Jérome, became the official supplier of paper and printing material to the Party's illegal press (which had been outlawed after the PCF had outraged public opinion and the Deladier government by condoning the Molotov–Ribbentrop Pact.) Philippe Robrieux argued that Jérome replaced Giulio Ceretti, the man charged with obtaining illegal funds for the Comintern. (Ceretti and Maurice Thorez had since been recalled to Moscow.)

When the German occupation of France began, Jérome was charged with maintaining contact with other elements of the Resistance, intellectuals as well as the Free French Forces of General Charles de Gaulle. He was arrested in 1943, an incident still wrapped in mystery. Some speculate that his activities brought the downfall of other communist Franc Tireurs Partisans (MOI), the group pictured in the Affiche Rouge led by Missak Manouchian. Still, Jean Jérome has since been awarded numerous distinctions for his participation in the underground movement: the Médaille de la Résistance, the Croix de Guerre, and the Légion d'honneur. The biographical profiles he himself submitted to PCF sources are very succinct.

According to Philippe Robrieux, Jean Jérome acted as fundraiser for the PCF up until the 1970s, through his known business ventures in the People's Republic of Poland and in Czechoslovakia.

== Autobiographical works ==
- La Part des Hommes, Acropole, 1983
- Les Clandestins (1940-44), Acropole, 1986
