= Nicolas Aithadi =

French visual effects supervisor

- Born: Amer Ait-haddi; 23 April 1972 (age 54); France
- Occupation: Visual effects supervisor
- Years active: 1996-present
- Children: Quentin Ait-haddi

Nicolas Aithadi (born 23 April 1972 in Saint-Denis, France) is a French visual effects supervisor working in London, Vancouver and Los Angeles.

== Career ==
Aithadi began his career from low-budget films to blockbusters such as Troy, Charlie and the Chocolate Factory and four Harry Potter films. For Harry Potter and the Deathly Hallows – Part 1, he was nominated for three BAFTA Awards and two Oscars.

He was nominated at the 87th Academy Awards for his work on the film Guardians of the Galaxy as the Marvel Visual Effects Supervisor. This was in the category of Best Visual Effects. His nomination was shared with Stephane Ceretti, Jonathan Fawkner and Paul Corbould. With them he was also nominated at the 68th British Academy Film Awards

== Awards and nominations ==
- 2010: BAFTA Award: Best Visual Effects - Harry Potter and the Half-Blood Prince - Nominated
- 2011: BAFTA Award: Best Visual Effects - Harry Potter and the Deathly Hallows – Part 1 - Nominated
- 2010: Academy Awards: Best Visual Effects - Harry Potter and the Deathly Hallows – Part 1 - Nominated
- 2014: BAFTA Award: Best Visual Effects - Guardians of the Galaxy - Nominated
- 2014: Academy Awards: Best Visual Effects - Guardians of the Galaxy- Nominated
