= Giulio Pittarelli =

Italian mathematician

Giulio Pittarelli (3 February 1852, Campochiaro, Campobasso – 2 March 1934, Rome) was an Italian mathematician, specializing in descriptive geometry and algebraic geometry.

Pittarelli received from the University of Naples his laurea in mathematics in 1874 and in engineering in 1876. For many years he was a professor of descriptive geometry at the Sapienza University of Rome. In addition to his mathematical career, he was a painter, an excellent pianist, and an author, who wrote a biography of Luigi Cremona.

Pittarelli was an invited speaker of the International Congress of Mathematicians in 1908 in Rome.

== Selected publications ==
- "Sul significato geometrico delle ueberschiebungen nelle forme binarie." Giornale di Matematiche di Battaglini 17 (1879): 160–171.
- "Intorno ad un problema die eliminazione nella teoria analitica della cubica gobba." Giornale di Matematiche di Battaglini 17 (1879): 244–259.
- "La cubica gobba e le forme binarie quadratiche e cubiche." Giornale di Matematiche di Battaglini 17 (1879): 260–309.
- "La lumache di Pascal (Nota I)." Giornale di Matematiche di Battaglini 21 (1883): 145–168.
- "La lumache di Pascal (Nota II)." Giornale di Matematiche di Battaglini 21 (1883): 173–212.
- "I gruppi continui proiettivi semplicemente infiniti nello spazio ordinario." Annali di Matematica Pura ed Applicata (1867–1897) 22, no. 1 (1894): 261-311. doi:10.1007/BF02353939
