= Giulio Giuricich =

South African soccer player

Personal information
- Date of birth: 5 February 1990 (age 36)
- Place of birth: Johannesburg, South Africa
- Position: Left-back

Senior career*
Years	Team	Apps	(Gls)
2008–2009	US Sassuolo Calcio	0	(0)
2008	→ AC Montichiari (loan)	2	(0)
2009–2010	AC Montichiari	6	(0)
2010	AC Castellana	3	(0)
2011–2012	S.G. Gallaratese	19	(0)
2012–2013	Moroka Swallows	1	(0)
- * Club domestic league appearances and goals

Giulio Giuricich (born 5 February 1990) is a South African former soccer player who played as a left-back

== Career ==
Giuricich was born in Johannesburg, Gauteng. He left his native South Africa at the age of 18 and joined the land of his forefathers, Italy. He joined to Serie A Side US Sassuolo Calcio on trial, but he failed a contract and signed a half-year loan deal with Serie C club AC Montichiari. In his two years with AC Montichiari, Giuricich played two games and moved in summer 2010 to League rival AC Castellana. He played three games in the Serie D with AC Castellana and signed in winter 2011 with S.G. Gallaratese.

He signed for Swallows during the 2012–13 season, after a successful month-long trial. Giuricich played six months with the Swallows and left the club in April 2013. He rejoined Swallows in February 2014 following a successful recovery from an injury.

He played for Moroka Swallows in the Premier Soccer League.

== Personal life ==
His sister is the TBS Group Spa business woman Simonetta Giuricich.
