= Giulio Maceratini =

Italian politician (1938–2020)

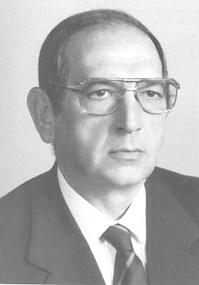
- Deputy Maceratini

Member of the European Parliament
- In office 6 June 1988 – 1 October 1988
- Preceded by: Giorgio Almirante
- Succeeded by: Marco Cellai

Personal details
- Born: 13 February 1938 Rome, Kingdom of Italy
- Died: 25 July 2020 (aged 82)
- Party: MSI; AN

Giulio Maceratini (13 February 1938 – 25 July 2020) was an Italian politician.

== Biography ==
He was a student of the philosopher Julius Evola. A criminal defense attorney who, within the MSI-DN, aligned with the views of Pino Rauti, he was nevertheless one of the key figures behind Gianfranco Fini return to the party’s leadership in 1991, following Rauti’s brief tenure. In the 1970s, he served as an executive at the Fiamma National Sports Center.
