= Giulio Carmignani =

Italian painter (1813–1890)

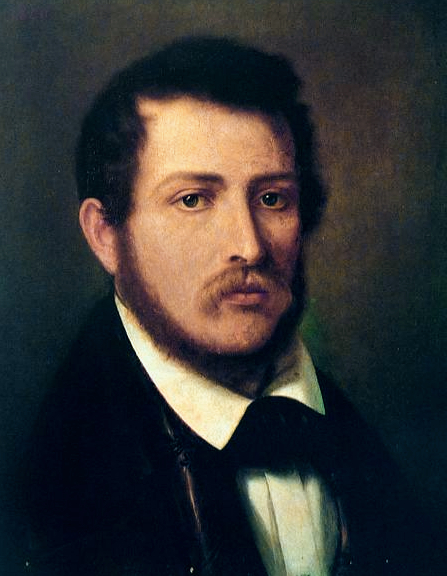
Self-portrait (c.1870)

Giulio Carmignani (14 September 1813 – 16 January 1890) was an Italian landscape painter and litterateur.

== Biography ==
He was born in Parma. His father was a typographer and he continued the family tradition, working for twenty-three years as the Director of "Tipografia Carmignani", whose primary client was the Gazzetta di Parma. He was, however, more drawn to literature and painting, especially landscapes. It is likely that his first teacher was Giuseppe Boccaccio, an artist and scenographer who was associated with the Accademia di Belle Arti di Parma, and whose style alternated between Neoclassicism and Romanticism.

In 1840, he began to exhibit his works at the Palazzo del Giardino and, after 1855, at the "Society for the Encouragement of Arts and Crafts", where he also served as an advisor. In 1859, he quit being a typographer and devoted himself entirely to creative pursuits. Most of his canvases focus on scenes in the city of Parma and his later style shows the influence of Luigi Marchesi and, after a visit to Naples, the Posillipo School.

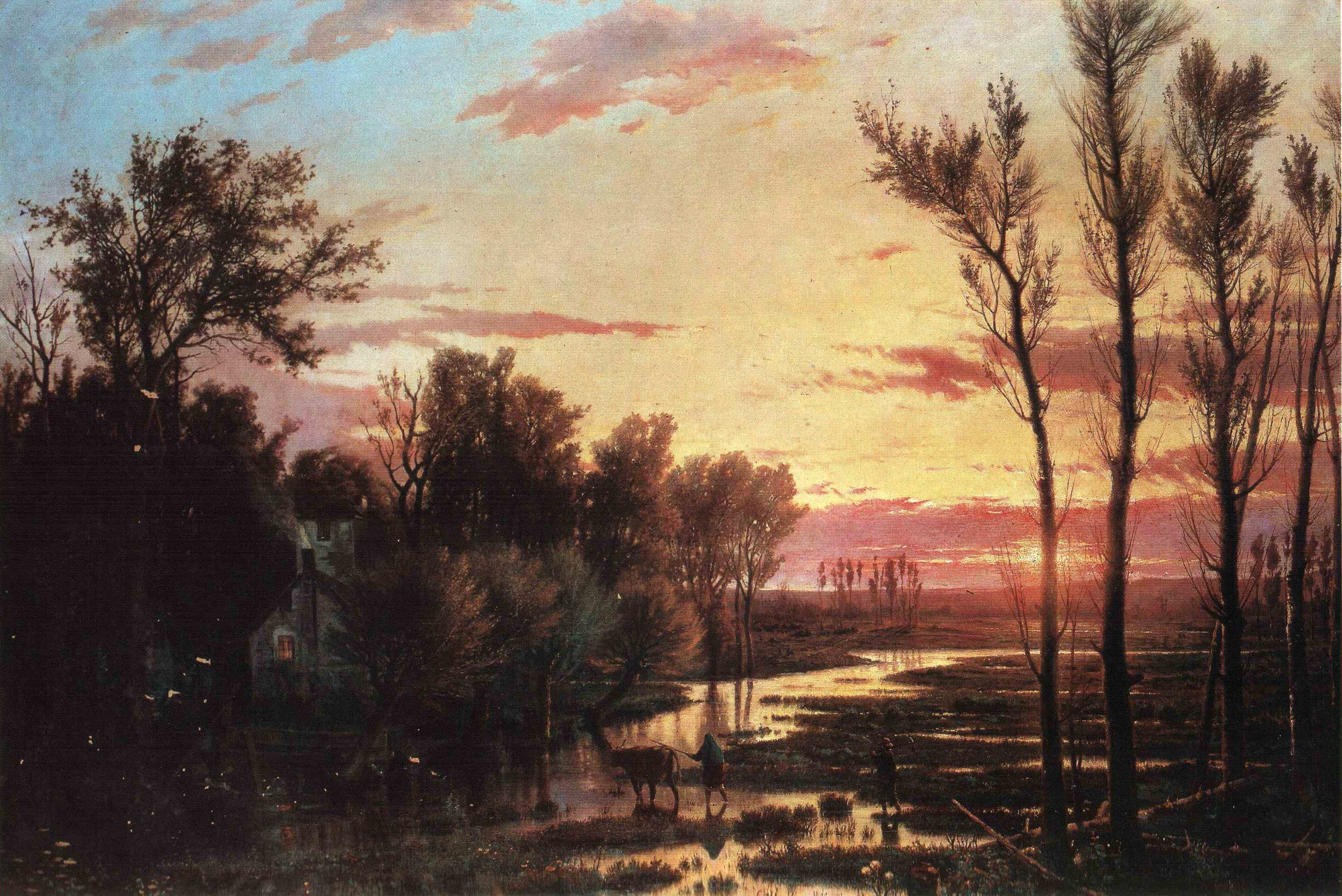
Sunset After the Rain

A major influence on his style came from his son Guido Carmignani, who would also become a notable painter. Guido had made a trip to Paris to research the latest trends in art and shared his enthusiasm for them, especially the Barbizon school. Inspired by this, Giulio created what are considered to be his masterpieces: "Un tramonto dopo la pioggia" (Sunset After the Rain, 1864) and "Colpo di Vento" (Gust of Wind, 1870), both of which are now in the Galleria nazionale di Parma.

He later suffered from a trembling of his hands (probably Parkinson's disease) that kept him from painting. After that, he devoted himself to literary studies, including a translation of Horace. He died in 1890 in Parma. A street there is named in his honor.
