= Vincent Cirelli =

Vincent Cirelli is a film special effects supervisor, producer and head of production. He is known for his works at Stan Winston Studios and Luma Pictures as a visual effects supervisor.

== Select filmography ==
- Pirates of the Caribbean: At World's End (2007)
- No Country for Old Men (2007)
- X-Men Origins: Wolverine (2008)
- Harry Potter and the Half-Blood Prince (2009)
- The Book of Eli (2010)
- Battle: Los Angeles (2011)
- Captain America: The First Avenger (2012)
- Prometheus (2012)
- The Avengers (2012)
- Saving Mr. Banks (2013)
- Guardians of the Galaxy (2014)
- Avengers: Age of Ultron (2015)
- In the Heart of the Sea (2015)
- Deadpool (2015)
- Doctor Strange (2016), for which he received an Academy Award for Best Visual Effects nomination at the 89th Academy Awards in 2017.

== Awards and nomination ==
- Nominated: Academy Award for Best Visual Effects - Doctor Strange
- Winner: Seattle Film Critics Awards - Doctor Strange
- Nominated: BAFTA Award for Best Special Visual Effects - Doctor Strange
- Nominated: Outstanding Visual Effects in a Commercial - Coca-Cola: A Mini Marvel
- Nominated: Satellite Award for Best Visual Effects - Doctor Strange
- Nominated: Visual Effects Society Award for Outstanding Visual Effects in an Effects Driven Feature Motion Picture - Doctor Strange
- Nominated: Gold Derby Award - Doctor Strange
- Nominated: OFTA Television Award - Best Visual Effects in a Series - Agents of S.H.I.E.L.D. (2013)
