= Giulio Ceretti =

Italian engineer and entrepreneur

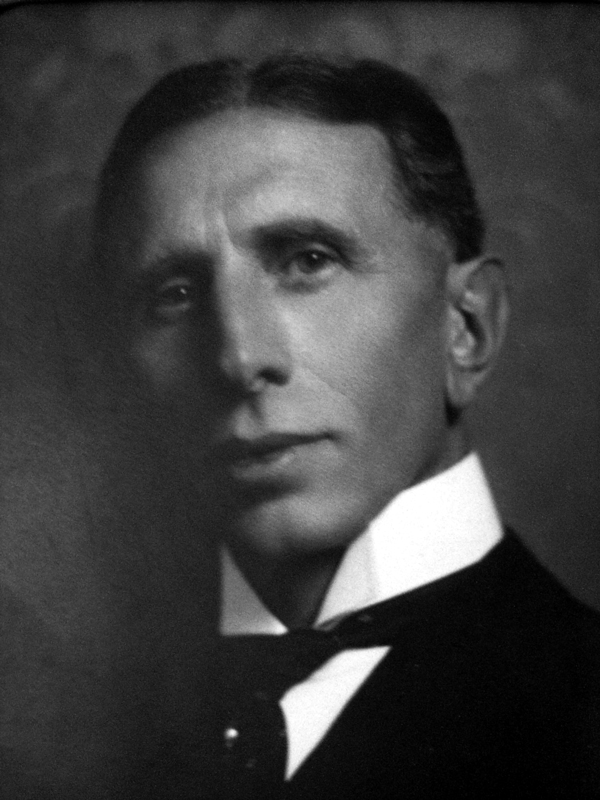
- Born: 1868; Bologna, Kingdom of Italy
- Died: 1934 (aged 65–66); Milan, Kingdom of Italy
- Occupation: engineer entrepreneur
- Children: Emilio Ceretti

Giulio Ceretti (1868–1934) was an Italian engineer and entrepreneur, active in the area of cable transport. Ceretti built the first aerial cableway with intermediate supports, and was one of the first engineers ever to design and install mechanical systems in harbours and dock yards in order to speed-up the loading and unloading of cargo ships.

== Career ==
Ceretti was born in Bologna, and graduated from the Politecnico di Milano (Polytechnic Institute of Milan) in 1890, after studying at the Polytechnic Institute of Zurich in 1889.

In 1894 he and his colleague, the engineer Vincenzo Tanfani, founded Ceretti & Tanfani. In the same year, the company installed a small aerial cableway at the United Expositions Fair in Milan; this cableway had only one antecedent, built in the United States of America the previous year.

In 1912, he built a cableway at Lana-San Vigilio, Merano; 2,2 km. long and 1153 metres high, it was the first example with intermediate supports running over rugged ground capable of carrying passengers. Ceretti's intermediate support system was quickly developed in other European and non-European countries, where it became a standard construction. Following, Ceretti received many awards for this development.

While continuing to work on cableways, Ceretti studied the inefficiencies of cargo-handling at harbours and docks. He developed new mechanical methods for moving cargos around, and in 1903 he designed technologies to lift weights, chutes and cableways for the Savona harbour, to load off coal on railway trucks.

During World War I he collaborated with the Italian Army. His expertise was helpful to the transportation of troops, ammunitions and supplies to the Alpine front line by aerial cable. Ceretti's expertise and contribution led him to become director of the Technical Department of the Italian Air Force, in Turin.

Thanks to his company Ceretti developed the Bovisa district in Milan, to provide accommodation for the families of his employees, and offered them soft loans through the Lombard Province Savings Bank, the Cassa di Risparmio delle Province Lombarde, of which he became vice-president.

Ceretti continued his work until his death in Milan in 1934, with Ceretti & Tanfani becoming one of the world's leading companies in the field of mechanical transport. Part of his legacy was the expansion of aerial cableways to the most inaccessible parts of the Alps.

== Awards ==
- 1914: the Lombard Institute of Literature, Sciences and Arts awarded Ceretti the Brambilla prize in recognition of his creation and development of new Italian industry.
- 1919, he was appointed Senior Official and 'Knight of the Grand Cross', decorated with the cross of St. Lazarus, and appointed as 'Knight of Labour'.

== Published works ==
- Giulio Ceretti, Aerial Cableways, London, E.&F.N. Spon LTD, New York, Spon & Chamberlain, 1927
- Giulio Ceretti & Giuseppe Pini, Mezzi e vie di trasporto, Pisa, Arti Grafiche Pacini Mariotti, 1931
- Giulio Ceretti, Cinque anni di fascismo alla Cassa di Risaprmio delle Provincie Lombarde, Milano, Cariplo, 1927

== Bibliography ==
- Rino Carassiti, Confindustria, Creatori di lavoro, Roma, Soc. tip. Capitolina, 1968–1972
- Rosanna Pavoni, Ornella Selvafolta, 1894. Le esposizioni riunite, Milano, Silvana Editoriale, 1994
