= Jonathan Fawkner =

British visual effects artist

- Born: September 9, 1973 (age 52)
- Occupation: Visual effects artist
- Years active: 1999-present

Jonathan Fawkner (born September 9, 1973) is a British visual effects artist.

He was nominated at the 87th Academy Awards, the 90th Academy Awards, the 94th Academy Awards and the 97th Academy Awards in the Best Visual Effects category for his work on the films Guardians of the Galaxy, Guardians of the Galaxy Vol. 2, No Time to Die and Wicked Part One.
