= Charlie Ebersol =

American television and film producer, director, and CEO

- Born: Charles Duncan Ebersol; December 30, 1982 (age 43); Torrington, Connecticut, U.S.
- Education: University of Notre Dame (BA)
- Occupations: Tech entrepreneur, Television producer, television director, film producer, film director, co-founder and CEO of the Alliance of American Football
- Spouse: Melody McCloskey (m. 2017)
- Parent(s): Dick Ebersol (father); Susan Saint James (mother)

Charles Duncan Ebersol (born December 30, 1982) is an American entrepreneur and filmmaker. Ebersol is best known as the co-founder of Tempus Ex Machina and The Company, executive producer of USA Network's NFL Characters Unite and a co-producer of The Profit on CNBC. He was also the co-founder and CEO of the now-defunct Alliance of American Football.

== Early life and education ==
Charlie Ebersol was born in Torrington, Connecticut, the son of actress Susan Saint James and senior television executive Dick Ebersol.

On November 28, 2004, during Ebersol's senior year at the University of Notre Dame, he was involved in a plane crash along with his father. Ebersol and his father survived the crash while his younger brother, Teddy, along with the pilot and a flight attendant were killed. The injuries the Ebersols sustained in the plane crash were extensive, but he returned to Notre Dame to finish his senior year and graduated with a Bachelor of Arts degree.

== Career ==
=== Early career ===
While studying at Notre Dame, Ebersol created his first documentary entitled Ithuteng: Never Stop Learning in 2006. The movie received critical acclaim, winning the Toronto International Film Festival's first OneXOne award and inspired Oprah Winfrey to donate $1.14 million to the Ithuteng Trust School. He produced the documentaries Don't Look Down, about the life of Olympian Shaun White after he won Olympic Gold in 2006, and Tradition Never Graduates, a film about Notre Dame Football.

In 2009, Ebersol formed and sold Saint James Films and also co-created and executive produced NBC's The Wanted, a primetime show in which Ebersol and producing partner Adam Ciralsky led a team of former Navy Seals, a former UN Ambassador and a former Lieutenant Green Beret around the world in search of the most wanted terrorists and war criminals.

=== Production career ===
In 2011, Charlie Ebersol co-founded The Hochberg-Ebersol (THE) Company with Justin Hochberg and Mike Lanigan. Early projects included TNT's The Great Escape, executive produced with Bertram van Munster, Ron Howard and Brian Grazer, and History's Off the Grid: Million Dollar Manhunt.

Ebersol created USA Network's The Moment in 2013, a show hosted by Kurt Warner devoted to giving Americans a second chance to achieve their dreams. Ebersol was inspired to create the show after receiving his own second chance at life after surviving a plane crash in 2004. Ebersol co-created and executive produced NFL Characters Unite, a yearly television special with USA Network, as well as The Profit and West Texas Investors Club on CNBC. In 2013 he worked with Dolph Lundgren on the Reelz competition show Race to the Scene.

The production company changed its name from THE Company to The Company in 2013, upon the exit of Justin Hochberg. In 2014, The company announced a production and finance partnership with Israeli production house Dori Media. Ebersol executive produced The Untitled Yale Drama for USA Network along with Rob Reiner, as well as Warner Brothers' Space Jam: A New Legacy.

Ebersol directed This Was the XFL, a documentary in the 30 for 30 series about the XFL. He was chosen by ESPN to direct the documentary because of his father's co-founding of the league, and he used the longtime friendship between Dick and WWE chairman Vince McMahon as the centerpiece for the film.

=== Alliance of American Football ===
In March 2018, Ebersol announced the creation of a new professional football league called the Alliance of American Football. Ebersol co-founded the league, which started playing in February 2019, with former NFL executive and Pro Football Hall of Fame inductee Bill Polian. On opening night, the AAF launched an app on which fans could follow games with low latency and win points by predicting plays in real time. The AAF app became the top sports app on the iOS store for the league's duration.

Ebersol's father, who co-founded the XFL and who led NBC Sports and created Sunday Night Football, sat on the league's board. The league was backed by investors such as Peter Thiel's Founders Fund, The Chernin Group and former NFL player Jared Allen, and employed coaches Mike Singletary, Brad Childress and Steve Spurrier as well as former NFL players including Justin Tuck, Hines Ward and Troy Polamalu who held executive roles.

Games were played during the "off-season," from February to April, and aired on CBS, CBS Sports Network, NFL Network, TNT, B/R Live and the league's mobile app.

After the AAF's primary investor, Reggie Fowler, did not contribute the $200 million he had promised, the AAF was purchased by Carolina Hurricanes owner Thomas Dundon after two weeks of play. Dundon suspended league operations after eight weeks, then filed for Chapter 7 bankruptcy in April 2019. Former players sued Dundon and Ebersol for breach of contract following the league's collapse, but Ebersol was later removed as a defendant after investigators cleared him of wrongdoing. In 2022, the lawsuit was dropped at the request of all parties involved.

=== Infinite Athlete ===
In 2021, Ebersol co-founded Tempus Ex Machina with former AAF CTO Erik Schwartz and COO Annie Gerhart, receiving investment funding from firms including Andreessen Horowitz, General Catalyst, Silver Lake, Endeavor, and Will Ventures.

Tempus Ex Machina provides data stream consolidation, data visualization, and integrated player tracking technology to sporting organizations including the National Football League, the NCAA's Pac-12 Conference, and Chelsea FC.

In August 2023, Tempus Ex Machina merged with biomechanical analytics firm Biocore to form Infinite Athlete.

== Personal life ==
Ebersol briefly dated tennis player Maria Sharapova in 2008. He also dated singer Britney Spears from October 2014 until June 2015. In 2017, he married Melody Brooke McCloskey at Blackberry Farm in Walland, Tennessee.
