= Off the grid =

Off-the-grid is a system and lifestyle designed to help people function without the support of remote infrastructure, such as an electrical grid.

Off the grid may also refer to:

== Film and television ==
- Off the Grid (film), a 2025 action film starring Josh Duhamel
- Off the Grid with Les Stroud, a 2006 documentary featuring Les Stroud building an off-the-grid home
- Warren Miller's Off the Grid, a 2006 film about winter sports featuring Warren Miller
- "Off the Grid" (Stargate SG-1), an episode of the television series Stargate SG-1
- Off the Grid: Life on the Mesa, a 2007 documentary film
- Off the Grid: Million Dollar Manhunt, a game show on The History Channel
- Off the Grid, a web series starring Jesse Ventura
- House Hunters Off the Grid, a TV series spin-off of House Hunters
- "Off the Grid" (Chicago Fire), a crossover episode of the television series Chicago Fire

== Music ==
- Off the Grid (Bliss n Eso album), 2017
- Off the Grid (The Fooo album), 2014
- Off the Grid, 2022 album by Yot Club
- "Off the Grid" (song), a 2021 song by Kanye West
- "Off the Grid", a song from the Beastie Boys album The Mix-Up

== Other uses ==
- Off the Grid (food organization), a mobile food festival in California, US
- Off the Grid (video game), 2024
