= The Recruit (American TV series) =

2022 American spy-adventure TV series

- Genre: Spy thriller; Adventure; Drama
- Created by: Alexi Hawley
- Starring: Noah Centineo; Laura Haddock; Aarti Mann; Colton Dunn; Fivel Stewart; Daniel Quincy Annoh; Kristian Bruun; Vondie Curtis-Hall; Kaylah Zander; Maddie Hasson; Angel Parker; Teo Yoo; Nathan Fillion
- Music by: Jordan Gagne
- Country of origin: United States
- Original language: English
- No. of seasons: 2
- No. of episodes: 14

Production
- Executive producers: Alexi Hawley; David Bartis; Doug Liman; Gene Klein; Noah Centineo; Charlie Ebersol; Adam Ciralsky; Julian Holmes
- Producers: Hadi Nicholas Deeb; Agatha Barnes; Marc David Alpert
- Production locations: Sorel-Tracy, Quebec; Los Angeles, California; Vienna, Austria
- Cinematography: Bernard Couture; Pierre Jodoin; Simon Chapman; Corey Robson
- Editors: Damien Smith; Adrienne McNally; Sang Han; Hibah Schweitzer
- Running time: 50–62 minutes
- Production companies: Hypnotic; Perfectman Pictures; Lionsgate Television (Note: Known as Entertainment One for the first season)

Original release
- Network: Netflix
- Release: December 16, 2022 – January 30, 2025

The Recruit is an American spy adventure television series created by Alexi Hawley for Netflix. The show follows Owen Hendricks (Noah Centineo), a CIA lawyer who becomes involved in massive international conflicts with dangerous parties after an asset tries to expose her relationship to the agency.

The series premiered on December 16, 2022, and the second season was released on January 30, 2025. In March 2025, The Recruit was canceled after two seasons.

== Synopsis ==
Fledgling lawyer Owen Hendricks, who has just started working for the CIA after graduating from Georgetown Law, has his life turned upside down when he encounters an Eastern European asset who threatens extortion if she is not freed from prison. As her long-term relationship with the CIA is revealed, he becomes entangled in convoluted international politics. Hendricks negotiates with the asset and finds himself at odds with menacing individuals and groups, risking his life as he tries to fulfill his duties.

== Cast and characters ==
=== Main ===
- Noah Centineo as Owen Hendricks, a newly hired CIA lawyer
- Laura Haddock as Max Meladze (season 1), a former CIA asset who is in prison for beating a shady trucker to death
- Aarti Mann as Violet Ebner, Owen's co-worker who messes with him
- Colton Dunn as Lester Kitchens, another co-worker of Owen's, and Violet's partner in crime
- Fivel Stewart as Hannah Copeland, Owen's roommate, ex-girlfriend, and former law school classmate
- Daniel Quincy Annoh as Terence Hoffman (season 1; guest season 2), Owen's other roommate and friend
- Kristian Bruun as Janus Ferber, Owen's overstressed colleague who reluctantly helps him out
- Vondie Curtis-Hall as Walter Nyland, Owen's boss and the CIA's general counsel
- Kaylah Zander as Amelia Salazar (season 2; recurring season 1), another colleague of Owen's, who also dates him
- Maddie Hasson as Nichka Lashin (season 2; guest season 1), a criminal and Max Meladze's grown daughter
- Angel Parker as Dawn Gilbane (season 2; recurring season 1), CIA operative doing a black op in Yemen
- Teo Yoo as Jang Kyu (season 2), a South Korean NIS agent

=== Recurring ===
- Victor Andrés Trelles Turgeon as Talco
- Byron Mann as Xander Goi, a senior case officer
- Nathan Fillion as Alton West, CIA director
- James Purefoy as Oliver Bonner-Jones (season 2)
- Brooke Smith as Marcy Potter (season 2)
- Devika Bhise as Juno Marsh (season 2)
- Felix Solis as Tom Wallace (season 2)
- Young-Ah Kim as Grace Cho (season 2), NIS deputy director
- Shin Do-hyun as Yoo Jin Lee (season 2), Owen's childhood ex-girlfriend
- Sanghee Lee as Nan Hee (season 2)
- Omar Maskati as Jae King (season 2)
- Alana Hawley Purvis as Amanda Fern (season 2)

== Episodes ==
=== Series overview ===
Season	Episodes	Originally released
1	8	December 16, 2022
2	6	January 30, 2025

=== Season 1 (2022) ===
Each episode of The Recruit bears CIA-like initials in its title. The codes, which are not unlike the multitude of initials for different divisions and projects that Owen Hendricks must understand in his role within the agency (codes Owen acknowledges at one point he has trouble keeping up with), represent a line of dialogue from their respective episodes.

No. overall	No. in season	Title	Directed by	Written by	Original release date
1	1	"I.N.A.S.I.A.L."	Doug Liman	Alexi Hawley	December 16, 2022
Title meaning: "I'm Not a Spy, I'm a Lawyer"
2	2	"N.L.T.S.Y.P."	Doug Liman	Alexi Hawley	December 16, 2022
Title meaning: "Never Let Them See You Pucker"
3	3	"Y.D.E.K.W.Y.D."	Alex Kalymnios	Alexi Hawley & George V. Ghanem	December 16, 2022
Title meaning: "You Don't Even Know What You Do"
4	4	"I.Y.D.I.A.A.C."	Alex Kalymnios	Amelia Roper	December 16, 2022
Title meaning: "If You Do It as Anderson Cooper"
5	5	"T.S.L.A.Y.P."	Emmanuel Osei-Kuffour	Hadi Nicholas Deeb	December 16, 2022
Title meaning: "That Sounds Like a You Problem" (Technically, Owen says, "Wow, sounds like a you problem".)
6	6	"I.C.I.N.C."	Emmanuel Osei-Kuffour	Niceole R. Levy	December 16, 2022
Title meaning: "I'm Clenching, I'm Not Clenching"
7	7	"I.M.F.T.B.S."	Julian Holmes	Maya Goldsmith	December 16, 2022
Title meaning: "It's My First Time Being Sexpionaged"
8	8	"W.T.F.I.O.H."	Julian Holmes	Alexi Hawley	December 16, 2022
Title meaning: "Who the Fuck Is Owen Hendricks?"

=== Season 2 (2025) ===
Each episode title for The Recruit is a reference to an especially catchy line of dialogue in the corresponding installment, written out as an abbreviation.

No. overall	No. in season	Title	Directed by	Written by	Original release date
9	1	"Y.N.A.H.Y.A.L."	Julian Holmes	Alexi Hawley	January 30, 2025
Title meaning: "You're not a hero, you're a lawyer"
10	2	"Y.A.R.A.C.O.T.D.O.P."	Jessica Yu	Bryan Oh	January 30, 2025
Title meaning: "You are really a condom on the dick of progress"
11	3	"H.H.I.I.T.K.A.L."	Viet Nguyen	Hadi Nicholas Deeb	January 30, 2025
Title meaning: "How hard is it to kill a lawyer?"
12	4	"A.T.N.W.H.Y.P.A.B.H."	John Hyams	Sue Chung	January 30, 2025
Title meaning: "And then Nyland will have you pulled apart by horses"
13	5	"W.S.T.W.T.P."	Julian Holmes	Maya Goldsmith & Neda Davarpanah	January 30, 2025
Title meaning: "We're still tinkering with the programmatics"
14	6	"I.D.N.W.T.B.D.I."	Alexi Hawley	Alexi Hawley	January 30, 2025
Title meaning: "I do not want to be dead inside"

== Production ==
=== Development ===
It was announced that Netflix acquired an unnamed espionage drama on April 28, 2021, with Entertainment One backing the production. Dubbed Graymail, the project was created by Alexi Hawley, executive producer of several popular procedural drama series, such as Castle, The Rookie, and its spin-off. Hawley again served as executive producer as well as showrunner. Alongside Hawley, Noah Centineo; Doug Liman, Gene Klein, and Dave Bartis of Hypnotic; and Adam Ciralsky and Charlie Ebersol of P3 Media also joined the project as executive producers. The project was set as an eight-part one-hour television series. It was unveiled on September 28, 2022, that Hawley, George Ghanem, Amelia Roper, Hadi Deeb, Niceole Levy, and Maya Goldsmith served as the series writers. Meanwhile, Doug Liman, Alex Kalymnios, Emmanuel Osei-Kuffour Jr., and Julian Holmes directed the episodes. On January 26, 2023, Netflix renewed the series for a second season. On March 5, 2025, Netflix canceled the series after two seasons.

=== Casting ===
When the production was announced on April 28, 2021, Centineo was unveiled as the lead character of the series. More castings were revealed on November 12, 2021, with Aarti Mann, Daniel Quincy Annoh, Vondie Curtis Hall, Kristian Bruun, Laura Haddock, Colton Dunn, and Fivel Stewart joining the main cast. In addition, Byron Mann, Angel Parker, and Kaylah Zander were also announced in recurring capacities.

On December 19, 2023, Teo Yoo was cast as a new series regular for the second season. On January 25, 2024, James Purefoy, Brooke Smith, Devika Bhise, Felix Solis, Young-Ah Kim, Do Hyun Shin, Sanghee Lee, Omar Maskati, and Alana Hawley Purvis joined the cast in recurring capacities for the second season.

=== Filming ===
Principal photography for the first season took place in Sorel-Tracy, Quebec, and Los Angeles, California, on October 25, 2021, and concluded on March 28, 2022. Filming for the second season began on January 4, 2024, and took place in Vancouver, Canada, and Seoul, South Korea.

== Release ==
The Recruit premiered globally on Netflix on December 16, 2022. The second season was released on January 30, 2025.

=== Marketing ===
The series was promoted during Netflix's TUDUM Global event on September 24, 2022, on YouTube.

== Reception ==
For the first season, the review aggregator website Rotten Tomatoes reported a 68% approval rating, with an average rating of 7/10, based on 31 critic reviews. The website's critics consensus reads, "The Recruit may not be the freshest chip off the old block, but it employs Noah Centineo's considerable charms to highly watchable effect." Metacritic, which uses a weighted average, assigned the show a score of 59 out of 100 based on 13 critics, indicating "mixed or average reviews".

Richard Roeper of Chicago Sun-Times gave the series 3 out of 4 stars and said, "Noah Centineo makes a likable lead on the flashy, funny series."

On Rotten Tomatoes, the second season has an approval rating of 87%, based on 15 critic reviews, with an average rating of 6.4/10. Metacritic assigned the second season a score of 73 out of 100, based on 4 critics, indicating "generally favorable" reviews.
