= Laura Haddock =

British actress (born 1985)

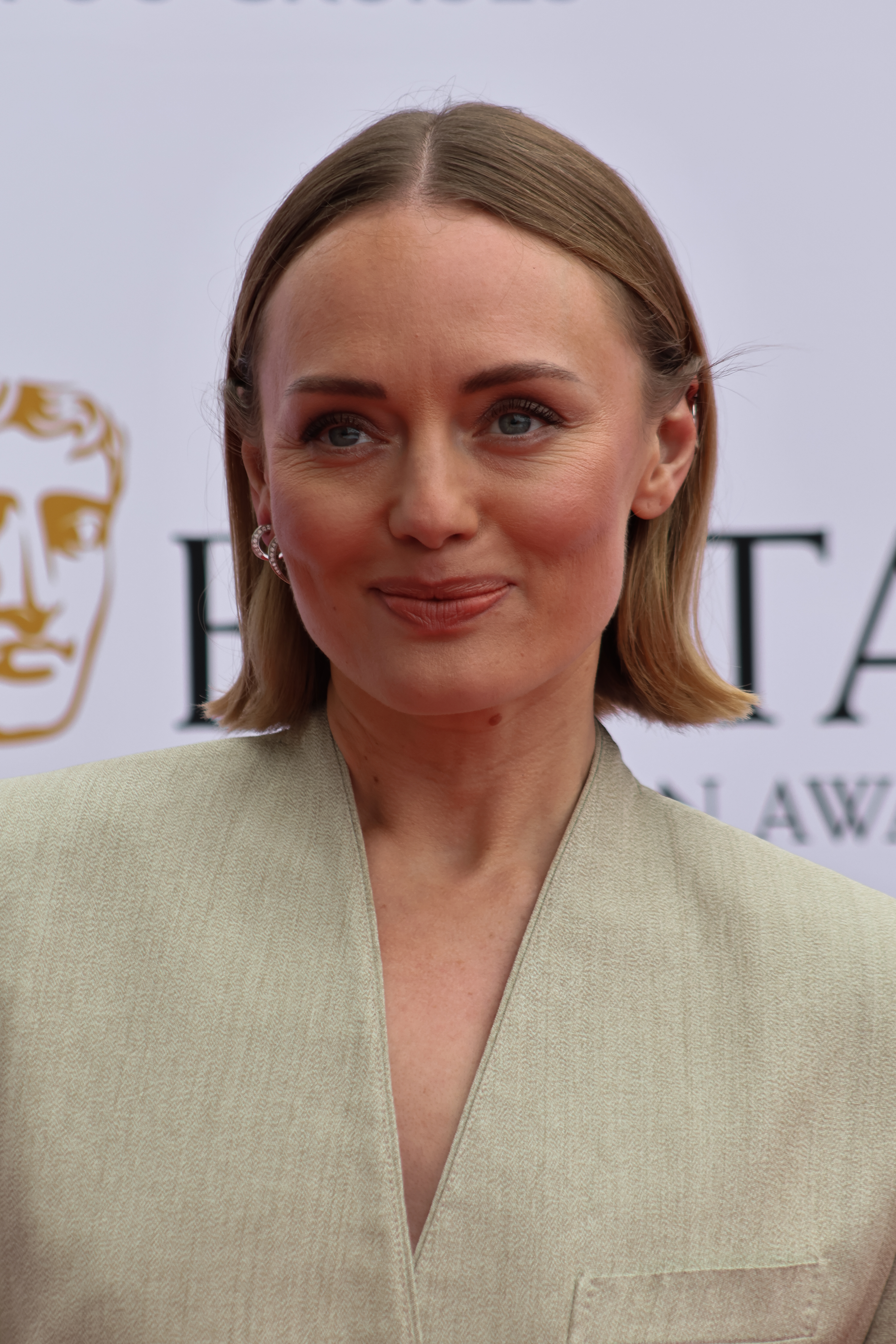
- Haddock at the 2026 British Academy Television Awards
- Born: August 21, 1985 (age 41); London, England
- Occupation: Actress
- Years active: 2007–present
- Spouse: Sam Claflin (m. 2013; sep. 2019)
- Children: 2

Laura Haddock (born 21 August 1985) is a British actress. She is known for portraying Alison in The Inbetweeners Movie, Zoë Walker in White Lines, Max Meladze in The Recruit, Lucrezia in Da Vinci's Demons, Meredith Quill in Guardians of the Galaxy and its sequel Guardians of the Galaxy Vol. 2, and Viviane Wembly in Transformers: The Last Knight.

== Early life and education ==
Laura Haddock was born on 21 August 1985 in Enfield, London, to a reflexologist mother and a financier father. She was raised in Harpenden, Hertfordshire.

She attended St George's School in Harpenden. She left school at the age of 17 and moved to London to study drama. She trained at Arts Educational School in Chiswick.

== Career ==
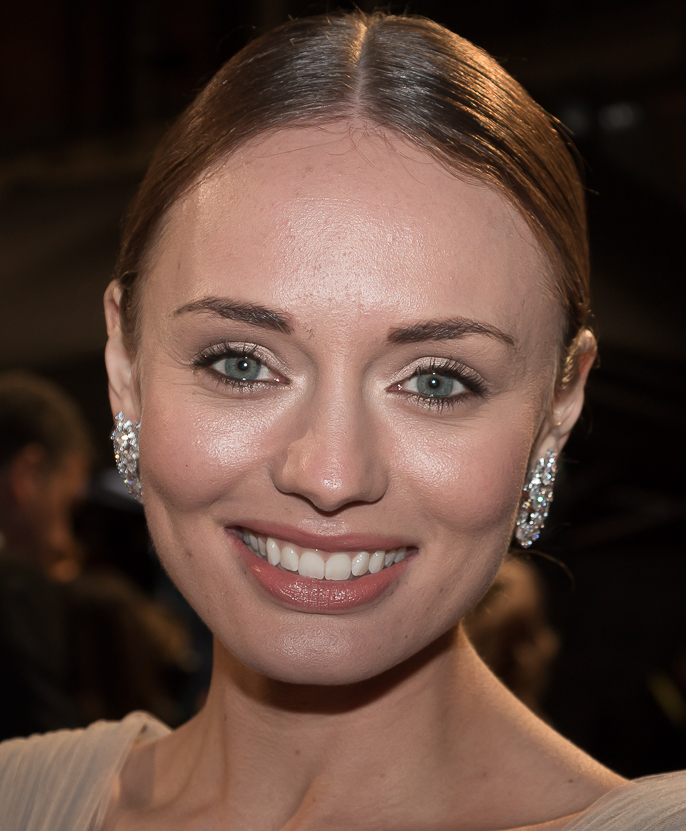
Haddock in 2015

Haddock made her television debut in the television pilot Plus One, part of the Comedy Showcase 2008. In 2009, Haddock played the lead role of Natasha in the ITV1 comedy drama Monday Monday, and appeared as Samantha in series two and three of How Not to Live Your Life.

In 2011, she appeared in the Cinemax/Sky TV drama Strike Back: Project Dawn for two episodes, as the kidnapped daughter of an illegal arms dealer. She starred as Lucrezia Donati, the mistress of Lorenzo de' Medici and lover of Leonardo da Vinci in the 2013 series Da Vinci's Demons. She played Alison, Will McKenzie's love interest, in The Inbetweeners Movie (2011), for which she was nominated for the Empire Award for Best Female Newcomer.

Haddock's theatre credits include Famous Last, which formed part of the 2009 Sky Arts Theatre Live! project, and Rutherford & Son at Northern Stage. In 2014, she portrayed Meredith Quill in Guardians of the Galaxy, a role she reprised in its 2017 sequel Guardians of the Galaxy Vol. 2. She appears in the ITV series, The Level, and played Vivian Wembley in the 2017 film Transformers: The Last Knight.

In 2021, Haddock starred in a Christmas marketing campaign for British furniture and home accessories retailer OKA. In 2022, she starred as Maxine Meladze in the Netflix spy-adventure television series The Recruit.

== Personal life ==
Haddock married English actor Sam Claflin in July 2013 after dating for two years. They have a son and a daughter. On 20 August 2019, Haddock and Claflin announced their legal separation.

== Filmography ==
=== Film ===
Year	Title	Role	Notes
2011	Captain America: The First Avenger	Autograph seeker	
2011	The Inbetweeners Movie	Alison	Nominated – Empire Award for Best Female Newcomer
2012	Storage 24	Nikki	
2012	House Cocktail	The Beautiful	Short films
2013	For Life	Adele	Short films
2013	Hardwire	Kelly	Short films
2014	Guardians of the Galaxy	Meredith Quill	
2014	A Wonderful Christmas Time	Cherie	
2015	SuperBob	June	
2017	Guardians of the Galaxy Vol. 2	Meredith Quill	
2017	Transformers: The Last Knight	Viviane Wembly	
2018	Black Swan Theory	Angela	Short film
2021	The Laureate	Nancy Nicholson	
2022	Downton Abbey: A New Era	Myrna Dalgleish	
2022	Hill of Vision	Lucy Ramberg	
2024	Damaged	Marie Boyd	
2024	Tyger	Hannah	
2025	Momo	Jackie	

=== Television ===
Key
†	Denotes television productions that have not yet been released

Year	Title	Role	Notes
2007	My Family	Melanie	Episode: "Life Begins at Fifty"
2007	Comedy Showcase	Nicky	Episode: "Plus One"
2008	The Colour of Magic	Bethan	Mini-series; 1 episode: "Part 2: The Light Fantastic"
2008	Agatha Christie's Marple	Miss Grosvenor	Episode: "A Pocket Full of Rye"
2008	Honest	Kacie Carter	6 episodes
2008	The Palace	Lady Arabella Worthesley Wolsey	2 episodes
2009	Monday Monday	Natasha	7 episodes
2009–2011	How Not to Live Your Life	Samantha	14 episodes
2011	Strike Back: Project Dawn	Dr. Clare Somersby	2 episodes: "Parts 5 and 6"
2011	Rage of the Yeti	Ashley	Television film
2012	Upstairs Downstairs	Beryl Ballard	6 episodes
2012	Missing	Susan Grantham	2 episodes: "Promise" and "Rain on the Evil on the Good"
2013	Dancing on the Edge	Josephine / Sarah	2 episodes: "Episode 5" (uncredited role) and "Interviewing Louis"
2013–2015	Da Vinci's Demons	Lucrezia Donati	26 episodes
2014	Ripper Street	Lady Vera Montacute	Episode: "The Incontrovertible Truth"
2015	Luther	Megan Cantor	2 episodes
2016	The Musketeers	Pauline	Episode: "The Queen's Diamonds"
2016	The Level	Hayley Svrcek	6 episodes
2019	The Capture	Hannah Roberts	6 episodes
2020	White Lines	Zoe Walker	Main role; 10 episodes
2022	The Recruit	Max Meladze	Main role; 8 episodes
2024	Grace	Cassie Klein	Episode: "Love You Dead"
2025	What It Feels Like for a Girl	Lisa	
2026	Ted Lasso	Dr. Erin Beaumont	3 episodes
2026	Number 10 †		Upcoming series
2027	Counsels 10 †	Jan Mallam	Upcoming series

=== Stage ===
Year	Title	Role	Notes
2009	Famous Last	Treena	Orange Tree Theatre
2009	Rutherford and Son	Mary	Northern Stage
2010	Old Jimmy's Daughter	Billy	The Great Theatre of Holland

== Awards and nominations ==
Year	Association	Category	Work	Result
2012	Empire Awards	Best Female Newcomer	The Inbetweeners Movie	Nominated
2014	Detroit Film Critics Society	Best Ensemble	Guardians of the Galaxy	Won
2014	Nevada Film Critics Society	Best Ensemble Cast	Guardians of the Galaxy	Won
2014	Phoenix Film Critics Society	Best Ensemble Acting	Guardians of the Galaxy	Nominated
2015	Central Ohio Film Critics Association	Best Ensemble	Guardians of the Galaxy	Nominated
2016	Critics' Choice Television Awards	Best Supporting Actress in a Movie or Miniseries	Luther	Nominated
2017	Golden Raspberry Awards	Worst Supporting Actress	Transformers: The Last Knight	Nominated
