= Shawn Efran =

American film director

- Education: University of Oregon, B.A. Journalism
- Occupations: Filmmaker, journalist, television producer
- Years active: 1993–Present
- Organization: Efran Films
- Style: Documentary films, varied
- Television: 60 Minutes
- Awards: Emmy Award, Peabody Award, Society of Professional Journalists award

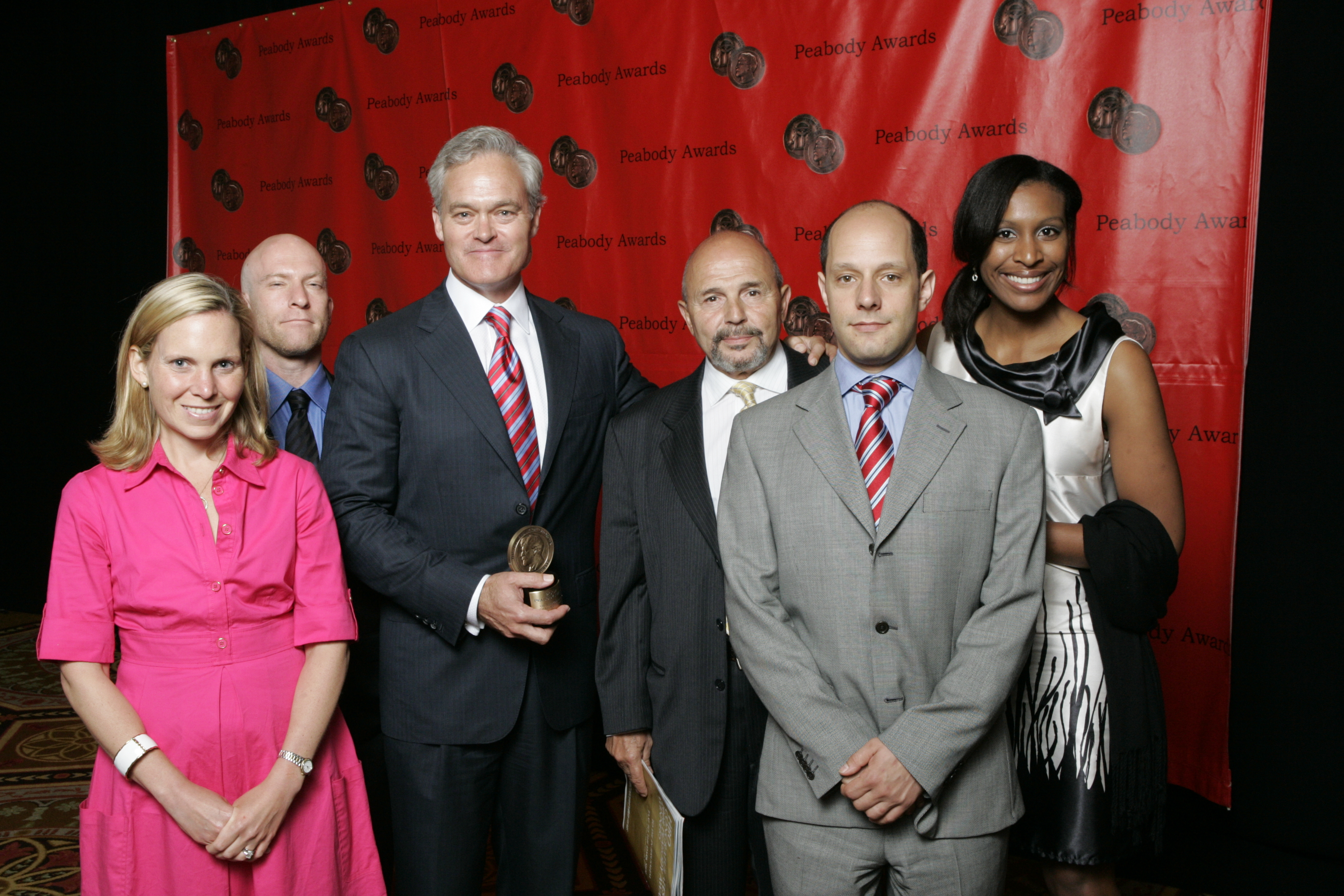
Shawn Efran (second from the right) at the 67th Annual Peabody Awards Luncheon, 2008.

Shawn Efran is an American/Canadian filmmaker, journalist, television producer, and media entrepreneur. His work, including as producer for 60 Minutes on CBS, and as founder and executive producer of Efran Films, has garnered critical acclaim, including seven Emmy awards, a Peabody, a Polk, and four Society of Professional Journalists National Distinguished Public Service Award.

== Career ==
Efran earned a Bachelor of Arts degree in Journalism from the University of Oregon, and went on to work as an Associate Producer for Court TV from 1993–1995.

From 1995 to 2010, Efran worked for CBS News in producing, writing and editing capacities. His work at 60 Minutes and 60 Minutes II on CBS includes two Emmy-winning documentaries – an investigation of the genocide in Darfur and a documentary following the Iowa National Guard through a deployment cycle in Iraq – and a Peabody-winning interview with a U.S. Marine accused of mass murder.

In 2010, he founded Efran Films, a multi-media production company, with offices in New York City and Toronto. Efran Films has produced for VICE TV, Paramount+, Investigation Discovery, Oxygen, BRAVO, Food Network, History Channel, ABC, NBC News, the Huffington Post, AOL, Weather.com, HDNet, AxsTV, Plum TV, Current TV, and others. Efran Films creates programming on topics ranging from home design to the revolution in Libya.

Efran and journalist Adam Ciralsky co-directed The Project, a theatrical documentary profiling the Somali pirate-hunting Puntland Maritime Police Force. The film was an official selection of the 2013 Tribeca Film Festival.

== Accolades ==
Efran has won two Emmy awards for "Outstanding Continuing Coverage" in 60 Minutes "Fathers, Sons, and Brothers", and "Searching for Jacob", a Peabody Award for "The Killings in Haditha", two Society of Professional Journalists awards for "The All American Canal" and "The Purge", an Overseas Press Club award and is a 2013 Webby Honoree for the AOL.com series Home of the Brave.

His company, Efran Films, has won four additional Emmy’s including two "Outstanding Business, Consumer and Economic Report" Awards for The Source: The Human Cost Hidden Within a Cup of Coffee in 2018 and Hidden Cost: Our Laws Have Not Kept Up With The Climate in 2019; as well as two "Outstanding Investigative Journalism in Spanish" Awards for The Real Death Valley in 2015, and Cosecha de Miseria (Harvest of Misery) in 2017.

The company was awarded in 2017 the Gerald Loeb Award for Video for Cosecha de Miseria (Harvest of Misery) & The Source produced for Telemundo and The Weather Channel.

The first season of the series ASPIREist, produced by Efran Films won the Edward R. Murrow Award for "Excellence in Innovation" in 2017, as well as 4 Editor & Publisher Awards in 2016.

The Emmy-winning film The Real Death Valley also won: the New York Press Club Award for "Continuing Coverage" in 2015, the George Polk Award for "Television Reporting", the Society of Professional Journalists Award for "Excellence in Journalism" in 2014 and was a Medal Winner of the 2014 Edition of the Investigative Reporters & Editors Award.
