= Infinite Athlete =

American sports technology corporation

- Type: Private
- Industry: Sports technology, Sports analytics, Biomechanics
- Founded: August 2023 (merger of Tempus Ex Machina and Biocore)
- Founder: Charlie Ebersol; Annie Gerhart-Ramsay; Jeff Crandall
- Headquarters: San Francisco, California, U.S.
- Area served: Global
- Key people: Charlie Ebersol (Co-CEO); Jeff Crandall (Co-CEO); Annie Gerhart-Ramsay (COO)
- Products: FusionFeed API; Match View X (MVX); integrated data stream consolidation and visualization platform
- Services: Data stream consolidation, data visualization, player tracking, biomechanics analytics, training facility installation, safety equipment certification
- Parent: (formed via merger of Tempus Ex Machina and Biocore)
- Website: infiniteathlete.ai

Infinite Athlete is an American sports data technology corporation headquartered in San Francisco, California. Formed from the merger of Biocore and Tempus Ex Machina, it provides data stream consolidation, data visualization, and integrated player tracking technology for organizations including the National Football League, Chelsea F.C., and the NCAA's Pac-12 Conference.

== Corporate history ==
=== Tempus Ex Machina ===
In 2021, Charlie Ebersol co-founded Tempus Ex Machina with former Alliance of American Football CTO Erik Schwartz and COO Annie Gerhart, receiving investment funding from firms including Andreessen Horowitz, General Catalyst, Silver Lake, Endeavor, and Will Ventures.

The company's first major client was the National Football League, for which it provided real-time data monitoring technology.

In March 2022, Tempus Ex partnered with the Pac-12 Conference, agreeing to provide on-campus data capture and analysis services to Pac-12 athletic programs.

In August 2022, the Pac-12 announced an initiative involving Tempus Ex, NIL marketplace Opendorse, Curastory, and Twitter, that allowed conference football players to monetize videos of their highlights on social media.

In April 2023, Tempus Ex entered into a seven-year agreement with Chelsea FC, involving data capture and visualization integrated into live events, player management, and the team's official app.

That same month, a similar agreement was signed to provide similar services to the University of Colorado athletics department.

=== Biocore ===
Biocore is a Virginia-based biomechanics consulting, data analytics, and research firm. In support of the NFL and NFLPA, it studies the impact of equipment and playing surfaces on player health.

Biocore evaluates different types of artificial turf, and has demonstrated that artificial fields cause more lower extremity injuries than natural grass fields.

Biocore research has demonstrated how add-on devices such as the Guardian Cap can reduce impacts and concussions. Their work on position-specific helmets led to quarterback-specific and lineman-specific helmets debuting during the 2023 season.

=== Merger ===
Tempus Ex Machina acquired Biocore in August 2023, with the newly formed entity rebranding as Infinite Athlete.

The newly rebranded company announced its first partnership as Infinite Athlete in the same month, a multi-year agreement with the TGL.
