= Guardians of the Galaxy (film) =

2014 Marvel Studios film

- Theatrical release poster
- Directed by: James Gunn
- Written by: James Gunn; Nicole Perlman
- Based on: Guardians of the Galaxy by: Dan Abnett; Andy Lanning
- Produced by: Kevin Feige
- Starring: Chris Pratt; Zoe Saldaña; Dave Bautista; Vin Diesel; Bradley Cooper; Lee Pace; Michael Rooker; Karen Gillan; Djimon Hounsou; John C. Reilly; Glenn Close; Benicio del Toro
- Cinematography: Ben Davis
- Edited by: Fred Raskin; Craig Wood; Hughes Winborne
- Music by: Tyler Bates
- Production company: Marvel Studios
- Distributed by: Walt Disney Studios Motion Pictures
- Release dates: July 21, 2014 (Dolby Theatre); August 1, 2014 (United States)
- Running time: 122 minutes
- Country: United States
- Language: English
- Budget: $232.3 million (gross); $195.9 million (net)
- Box office: $773.3 million

Guardians of the Galaxy (retroactively referred to as Guardians of the Galaxy Vol. 1) is a 2014 American superhero film based on the Marvel Comics superhero team the Guardians of the Galaxy. Produced by Marvel Studios and distributed by Walt Disney Studios Motion Pictures, it is the 10th film in the Marvel Cinematic Universe (MCU). Directed by James Gunn, who wrote the screenplay with Nicole Perlman, it features an ensemble cast including Chris Pratt, Zoe Saldaña, Dave Bautista, Vin Diesel, and Bradley Cooper as the titular Guardians, along with Lee Pace, Michael Rooker, Karen Gillan, Djimon Hounsou, John C. Reilly, Glenn Close, and Benicio del Toro. In the film, Peter Quill (Pratt) and a group of extraterrestrial criminals go on the run after stealing a powerful artifact.

Perlman began working on the screenplay in 2009. Producer Kevin Feige first publicly mentioned Guardians of the Galaxy as a potential film in 2010 and Marvel Studios announced it was in active development at the July 2012 San Diego Comic-Con. Gunn was hired to write and direct the film that September. In February 2013, Pratt was hired to play Peter Quill / Star-Lord, and the supporting cast members were subsequently confirmed. Principal photography began in July 2013 at Shepperton Studios in England, with filming continuing in London before wrapping in October 2013. In addition to an original score by Tyler Bates, the soundtrack includes several popular songs from the 1960s and 1970s chosen by Gunn. Post-production was completed on July 7, 2014.

Guardians of the Galaxy premiered at the Dolby Theatre in Hollywood, Los Angeles, on July 21, 2014, and was theatrically released in the United States on August 1 as part of Phase Two of the MCU. It was a critical and commercial success, grossing $773.3 million worldwide and became the third-highest-grossing film of 2014. It was praised for its screenplay, direction, acting, humor, soundtrack, visual effects and action sequences. It was nominated for two awards at the 87th Academy Awards, and received numerous other accolades. Two sequels have been released: Guardians of the Galaxy Vol. 2 (2017) and Guardians of the Galaxy Vol. 3 (2023).

== Plot ==
In 1988, following his mother's death, the child Peter Quill is abducted from Earth by the Ravagers, a group of alien thieves and smugglers led by Yondu Udonta. In 2014, on the abandoned planet Morag, Quill steals a mysterious Orb but is attacked by henchmen of the fanatical Kree renegade Ronan the Accuser, led by Korath. Although Quill escapes with the Orb, Yondu discovers his theft and issues a bounty for his capture, while Ronan sends the assassin Gamora after the Orb.

When Quill attempts to sell the Orb on Xandar, the capital of the Nova Empire, Gamora ambushes him and steals it. A fight ensues, drawing in a pair of bounty hunters: Rocket, a genetically and cybernetically modified raccoon, and his companion, the tree-like humanoid Groot. Nova Corps officers capture the four, detaining them in the Kyln prison. An inmate, Drax the Destroyer, attempts to kill Gamora due to her association with Ronan, who killed his wife and daughter. Quill convinces Drax that Gamora can bring Ronan to him, though Gamora reveals that she has betrayed Ronan, unwilling to let him use the Orb's power. Learning that Gamora intends to sell the Orb to the Collector Taneleer Tivan, Quill, Rocket, Groot, and Drax work with her to escape the Kyln in Quill's ship, the Milano.

Ronan meets with Gamora's adoptive father, Thanos, to discuss her betrayal. Quill's group flees to Knowhere, a city planet inhabited by thieves and merchants made from the severed head of a dead Celestial. A drunken Drax summons Ronan while the rest of the group meets Tivan. Tivan opens the Orb, revealing an Infinity Stone, an item of immeasurable power that destroys all but the most powerful beings who wield it. Tivan's slave, Carina, grabs the Stone, triggering an explosion that engulfs Tivan's collection. Ronan arrives and easily defeats Drax, while the others flee by ship, pursued by Ronan's followers, including Gamora's adoptive sister Nebula. Nebula destroys Gamora's ship, leaving her floating in space, and Ronan's fighters capture the Orb.

Quill contacts Yondu before following Gamora into space, giving her his helmet to survive; Yondu arrives and retrieves the pair. Rocket, Drax, and Groot threaten to attack Yondu's ship to rescue them, but Quill negotiates a truce, promising the Orb to Yondu. Quill's group agrees that facing Ronan means certain death but that they cannot let him use the Infinity Stone to destroy the galaxy. On Ronan's flagship, the Dark Aster, Ronan embeds the Stone in his warhammer, taking its power for himself. He contacts Thanos, threatening to kill him after first destroying Xandar. Hateful of her adoptive father, Nebula allies with Ronan.

The Ravagers and Quill's group join the Nova Corps to confront the Dark Aster at Xandar, with Quill's group breaching the warship with the Milano. Ronan uses his empowered warhammer to destroy the Nova Corps fleet. Drax kills Korath, and Gamora defeats Nebula, who escapes. However, the group finds themselves outmatched by Ronan's power. Rocket crashes a Ravager ship through the Dark Aster. The damaged Dark Aster crash-lands on Xandar, with Groot sacrificing himself to shield the group. Ronan emerges from the wreck and prepares to destroy Xandar, but Quill distracts him, allowing Drax and Rocket to destroy Ronan's warhammer. Quill grabs the freed Stone, and with Gamora, Drax, and Rocket sharing its burden, uses it to vaporize Ronan.

Quill gives Yondu a container supposedly containing the Stone and gives the real one to the Nova Corps. As the Ravagers leave Xandar, Kraglin Obfonteri remarks that it turned out well that they did not deliver Quill to his father per their contract. Quill's group, now known as the Guardians of the Galaxy, has their criminal records expunged, and Quill learns that he is only half-human, his father being part of an ancient, unknown species. Quill finally opens the last present he received from his mother, a cassette tape filled with her favorite songs. The Guardians leave in the rebuilt Milano along with a potted sapling cut from Groot, which grows into a baby version of him.

In a post-credits scene, Tivan sits in his destroyed archive with two of his living exhibits: a canine cosmonaut and an anthropomorphic duck. (Note: Identified outside the film's narrative as Cosmo the Spacedog and Howard the Duck.)

== Cast ==
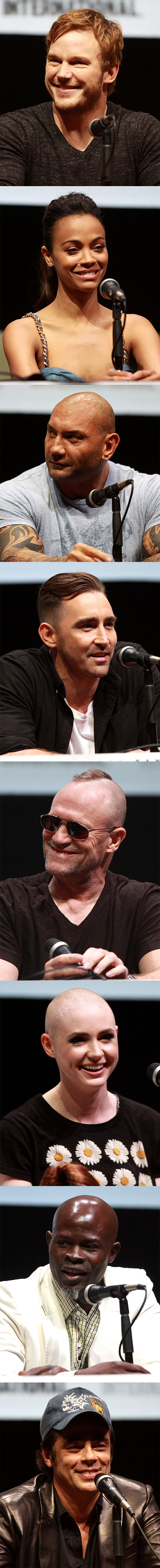
The cast of Guardians of the Galaxy promoting the film at the 2013 San Diego Comic-Con. From top to bottom: Pratt, Saldaña, Bautista, Pace, Rooker, Gillan, Hounsou, and del Toro (scrollable image)
- Chris Pratt as Peter Quill / Star-Lord:
  The half-human, half-alien leader of the Guardians who was abducted from Missouri as a child in 1988 and raised by a group of alien thieves and smugglers called the Ravagers. About the character, Pratt said, "He had a hard time as a kid, and now he goes around space, making out with hot alien girls and just being a rogue and a bit of a jerk, and through teaming up with these guys, finds a higher purpose for himself". He also added that the character is a mix of Han Solo and Marty McFly. Pratt, who was mostly known for playing supporting characters, including Andy Dwyer on the television series Parks and Recreation, initially turned down the role. Pratt had lost weight to portray fit characters in films such as Moneyball (2011) and Zero Dark Thirty (2012), and had given up ambitions to play the lead role in action films after humbling auditions for Star Trek and Avatar (both 2009). Casting director Sarah Finn suggested Pratt to Gunn, who dismissed the idea despite struggling to cast that role. Despite this, Finn arranged for a meeting between the two, at which point Gunn was immediately convinced that Pratt was perfect for the role. Pratt also won over Feige, despite having gained weight again for Delivery Man (2013). Prior to filming, Pratt underwent a strict diet and training regimen to lose 60 pounds (27 kg) in six months. Pratt signed a multi-film contract with Marvel, and was granted a temporary leave from his work on Parks and Recreation to accommodate his participation in the film. Wyatt Oleff portrays a young Quill.
- Zoe Saldaña as Gamora:
  An orphan from an alien world who seeks redemption for her past crimes. She was trained by Thanos to be his personal assassin. Saldaña said that she became Gamora through make-up rather than computer-generated imagery (CGI) or performance capture. On taking the role, Saldaña said, "I was just excited to be asked to join by James Gunn and to also play someone green. I've been blue before [in Avatar]". Saldaña described Gamora as "... a warrior, she's an assassin and she's very lethal, but what saves her is the same thing that can doom her. She has a sense of righteousness. She's a very righteous individual".
- Dave Bautista as Drax the Destroyer:
  A warrior who seeks to avenge his family's death at the hands of Ronan. On relating to the character, Bautista said, "I can just relate to Drax so much it's not even funny. Just the simple things that we have in common. Simple things like the tattoos, the tragedy—because, you know, I had a bit of tragedy in my life, as well. So it's really easy for me to pull from that". Bautista also said that there was "a lot of comic relief to Drax", but the character was not aware of it. Bautista stated that he did not do much preparation for the role, because "Luckily, for me, I'm a lifelong athlete and I adapted real quick". Bautista's makeup took approximately four hours to apply, though it could be removed in just 90 minutes. Drax has various scarring patterns on his body, which replace the simple tattoos from the comics, each having a specific story. Additionally, his skin tone was changed from the bright green in the comics to a muddier gray, to avoid visual similarities to the Hulk.
- Vin Diesel as Groot:
  A tree-like humanoid, who is the accomplice of Rocket. Diesel stated that he provided the voice and motion capture for Groot, after originally being in talks to star in a new Phase Three Marvel film. Diesel also provided Groot's voice for several foreign-language releases of the film. Krystian Godlewski portrayed the character on set, though his acting was not used in the final character CGI. On the character, which Gunn based on his dog, Gunn said, "All the Guardians start out the movie as bastards—except Groot. He's an innocent. He's a hundred percent deadly and a hundred percent sweet. He's caught up in Rocket's life, really". Gunn added that the design and movement of Groot took "the better part of a year" to create. Gunn added, "The ways in which Vin Diesel says, 'I am Groot,' I am astounded. All of the 'I am Groots' that were earlier voices didn't sound very good at all ... Vin came in and in one day, laid down all these 'I am Groot' tracks, and he's a perfectionist. He made me explain to him with ever [sic] 'I am Groot,' exactly what he was saying ... It was amazing when we first put that voice in there how much the character changed and how much he influenced the character". Regarding the limited words used by Groot, Diesel said in many ways this was, "... the most challenging thing to ask an actor to do". Diesel found an emotional note in his performance, invoking the death of his friend and Fast & Furious co-star Paul Walker, saying, "This was in December [2013], and the first time I came back to dealing with human beings after dealing with death, so playing a character who celebrates life in the way Groot does was very nice". Groot's form and size-changing abilities are seen, with Gunn stating that he has the ability to grow in the film.
- Bradley Cooper as Rocket:
  A genetically-engineered raccoon-based bounty hunter, mercenary, and master of weapons and battle tactics. Gunn worked with live raccoons to get the correct feel for the character, and to make sure it was "not a cartoon character", saying, "It's not Bugs Bunny in the middle of the Avengers, it's a real, little, somewhat mangled beast that's alone. There's no one else in the universe quite like him, he's been created by these guys to be a mean-ass fighting machine". Out of his original feelings that a talking raccoon could look a bit goofy in a superhero film, Gunn came up with a tragic origin story for Rocket that made him the "saddest creature" in the universe; said backstory would be eventually explored in Guardians of the Galaxy Vol. 3 (2023). Gunn also based the character on himself. Describing Rocket in relation to the rest of the Guardians, Cooper said, "I think Rocket is dynamic. He's the sort of Joe Pesci in Goodfellas guy". Cooper voiced Rocket, while Sean Gunn (James' younger brother) stood in for the character during filming. James Gunn said that for the role of Rocket, some physical movements from Cooper, including facial expressions and hand movements, were recorded as potential references for the animators, though much of Sean Gunn's acting is used throughout the film. Sean noted they "kind of stumbled" into the process of him performing on set since they "weren't sure how we were going to create that character". The same process continued to be used for all subsequent appearances of Rocket. Before Cooper was cast, James Gunn said that it was a challenge finding a voice for Rocket, that he was looking for someone who could balance "the fast-talking speech patterns that Rocket has, but also can be funny, because he is really funny. But also has the heart that Rocket has. Because there are actually some pretty dramatic scenes with Rocket".
- Lee Pace as Ronan the Accuser:
  A Kree zealot and war criminal who agrees to retrieve an artifact for Thanos in exchange for the annihilation of his mortal enemies, the Xandarians. Ronan and his Sakaaran army hunt down the Guardians when they interfere with his goals. Describing Ronan, Gunn said, "He is the primary villain, and he is a really twisted guy, he has a really religious bent in this film. He has a very sick and twisted view of what morality is; strength is virtue and weakness is sin and that is what he lives by, and I think he is very scary because of his beliefs, which are real to him". Pace, who originally auditioned for Peter Quill, described Ronan as a "psycho" and a "monster".
- Michael Rooker as Yondu Udonta:
  A blue-skinned bandit who is the leader of the Ravagers and a paternal figure to Quill. Yondu helps Quill to steal the orb before Quill betrays him, leaving Yondu and the Ravagers to chase the Guardians. On the character, Rooker said, he has "some interesting issues—not a good guy, not a bad guy. There's hope and there's a heart inside Yondu". Gunn created the film's version of the character specifically with Rooker in mind, while borrowing the character's mohawk and use of a whistle-controlled arrow from the comics. Rooker fully committed to the role once he knew his role on the TV series The Walking Dead would be ending. Rooker's makeup took approximately four hours to apply.
- Karen Gillan as Nebula:
  An adopted daughter of Thanos who was raised with Gamora as siblings and is a loyal lieutenant in the employ of Ronan and Thanos. About the character, Gillan said, "She is the female villain of the film ... She is very sadistic and evil, but I like to think for a very valid reason". She also added, "I think she's a really interesting character. What I like to play around with is how jealous she is. She's Gamora's sister, and there's a lot of sibling rivalry. That's the most interesting aspect to me, because jealousy can consume you and turn you bitter, and ugly. And she's a total sadist, so that's fun too". Gunn and Gillan worked to create Nebula's voice as a simultaneous impression of Marilyn Monroe and Clint Eastwood. Gillan researched the ancient Spartans, shaved off her hair and trained for two months for the role. The character's makeup took approximately four-and-a-half hours to be applied.
- Djimon Hounsou as Korath:
  A Kree ally of Ronan who is a feared intergalactic hunter. As to why he took the role, Hounsou said, "I have a four-year old son who loves superheroes from Spider-Man to Iron Man to Batman. He's got all the costumes. One day he looks at me and says 'Dad, I want to be light-skinned so I could be Spider-Man. Spider-Man has light skin.' That was sort of a shock. This is why I am excited to be a part of the Marvel Universe, so I could hopefully provide that diversity in the role of the superhero".
- John C. Reilly as Rhomann Dey: A corpsman in the Nova Corps, the Nova Empire's military and police force.
- Glenn Close as Irani Rael:
  The leader of the Nova Corps, known as Nova Prime, whose mission is to protect the citizens of the Nova Empire and keep peace. Close stated that she "had always wanted to be in a movie like this", and that it would be "the most fun to play something like the Judi Dench [as M] or Samuel L. Jackson [as Nick Fury] role". She said that she took the role because she "love[s] to do stuff that's different" and wanted to show that she "[has] always been up for anything". She also stated that her contract has "several" films on it, and that she would be open to working on other Marvel Studios films in addition to returning for Guardians sequels.
- Benicio del Toro as Taneleer Tivan / The Collector:
  An obsessive keeper of the largest collection of interstellar fauna, relics, and species in the galaxy who operates out of a place in space named Knowhere. Describing del Toro's performance, Gunn said, "He's like an outer-space Liberace. That's what it says in the script, which he's kind of doing". On bringing the character to life, del Toro said, "What James [Gunn] wanted, that I found out little by little as I was doing it, is that he wanted me to explore and just keep pushing the character and keep creating [him] as I was in front of the camera".

Additionally, Josh Brolin appears, uncredited, as Thanos through voice acting and performance capture, taking over the role from Damion Poitier. Sean Gunn stood in for Thanos during filming and portrays Kraglin Obfonteri, Yondu's first mate in the Ravagers. Alexis Denisof reprises his role as Thanos' vizier, "the Other", from The Avengers (2012). Ophelia Lovibond plays Carina, the Collector's slave; Peter Serafinowicz plays Denarian Garthan Saal, a Nova Corps officer; Gregg Henry plays Quill's grandfather; Laura Haddock plays Quill's mother, Meredith; Melia Kreiling plays Bereet; Christopher Fairbank plays the Broker; Mikaela Hoover plays Nova Prime's assistant; Marama Corlett plays a pit boss at the bar, The Boot; Emmett J. Scanlan plays a Nova riot guard; Alexis Rodney plays Moloka Dar; Tom Proctor plays Horuz, a Ravager; and Spencer Wilding plays a prison guard who confiscates Quill's Walkman. Canine actor Fred appears as Cosmo. Stephen Blackehart had a supporting role. Naomi Ryan also had a supporting role in the film, though it was cut in the final version. Ralph Ineson has a brief role as a Ravager pilot. Cameos in the film include: James Gunn as a Sakaaran; Stan Lee as a Xandarian Ladies' Man; Lloyd Kaufman as an inmate; Nathan Fillion as the voice of an inmate; Rob Zombie as the voice of the Ravager Navigator; composer Tyler Bates as a Ravager pilot; and Seth Green as the voice of Howard the Duck.

== Production ==
=== Development ===
I think anybody ... who would have said that this would make a great main movie would have been laughed off. It's such an unlikely thing to do. So I think it's lovely to work on something and expose its potential to the point where a company like Marvel will say, 'Yes, this makes sense.'

— Dan Abnett, co-writer of the 2008 Guardians of the Galaxy relaunch, on the project

Marvel Studios President Kevin Feige first mentioned Guardians of the Galaxy as a potential film at the 2010 San Diego Comic-Con, stating, "There are some obscure titles, too, like Guardians of the Galaxy. I think they've been revamped recently in a fun way in the [comic] book." Feige reiterated that sentiment in a September 2011 issue of Entertainment Weekly, saying, "There's an opportunity to do a big space epic, which Thor (2011) sort of hints at, in the cosmic side" of the Marvel Cinematic Universe (MCU). Feige added, should the film be made, it would feature an ensemble of characters, similar to X-Men (2000) and The Avengers (2012).

Feige announced that the film was in active development at the 2012 San Diego Comic-Con during the Marvel Studios panel, with an intended release date of August 1, 2014. He said the film's titular team would consist of the characters Star-Lord, Drax the Destroyer, Gamora, Groot, and Rocket. Two pieces of concept art were also displayed, one of Rocket Raccoon, and one featuring the entire team. Colin Trevorrow had discussions to direct the film, but he turned it down as he was never a comic book fan. In August 2012, James Gunn entered talks to direct the film, beating out other contenders, including future MCU directors Peyton Reed and the duo Anna Boden and Ryan Fleck. The Avengers director Joss Whedon, who signed a deal to creatively consult on all of the films leading up to The Avengers sequel (2015), was enthusiastic about the selection of Gunn to direct, saying "James [Gunn] is what makes me think it will work ... He is so off the wall, and so crazy, but so smart, such a craftsman and he builds from his heart. He loves the raccoon. Needs the raccoon ... He has a very twisted take on it, but it all comes from a real love for the material. It's going to be hard for [the human characters] to keep up".

==== Writing ====
Nicole Perlman, who was enrolled in Marvel's screenwriting program in 2009, was offered several of their lesser known properties to base a screenplay on. Out of those, Perlman chose Dan Abnett and Andy Lanning's Guardians of the Galaxy, due to her interest in space and science fiction, adding, "I think [Marvel] were a little taken aback when I chose Guardians, because there were ones that would make a lot more sense if you were a romantic-comedy writer or something like that". Perlman wrote 10 drafts between 2009 and 2011, in which she tried various combinations of characters for the team, including the original members in the comics, before settling on Abnett and Lanning's run since theirs "were the most fun". Early drafts centered on Nova, before Nate Moore, the head of the studios' writing program, suggested it change to Star-Lord. Subsequent drafts saw Star-Lord reimagined to be closer to a Han Solo-type character; the inclusion of 1980s and 1990s music from Perlman's childhood, which would become the 1970s and 1980s pop mixtape in Gunn's later drafts; and the eventual opening scene of the film on a desolate planet that harkened back to a memory Perlman had at Disneyland viewing a drained-out Submarine Voyage. Gunn was brought in in early 2012 to contribute to the script, eventually rewriting the script entirely because "it didn't work" for him; he would use the film The Dirty Dozen (1967) as a reference to convey his ideas of the film to Marvel.

Gunn later explained that Perlman's draft was very different from the script he used during filming, including a different story, character arcs and no Walkman; he stated, "In Nicole's script everything is pretty different ... it's not about the same stuff. But that's how the WGA works." The 2012 screenplay also had J'son as an emperor and Peter Quill / Star-Lord's father just like in the comic books. When Marvel asked Joss Whedon to revise the script ahead of Age of Ultron, Whedon particularly detested this reveal and suggested Marvel to not make Peter part of royalty; Whedon suggested Gunn to make the story "weirder" after reading the early draft. Throughout the writing process, there was some debate on whether keeping Rocket as a member of the Guardians or even featuring the character at all in the film due to concerns that he could come off as "too cartoonish", hence why a few drafts excluded the character, but Perlman felt that the character's inclusion was necessary and was happy at Feige letting her keep him in the script due to him being a great Rocket fan. In August 2012, Marvel Studios hired writer Chris McCoy to rewrite Perlman's script, but was not credited in the final film.

Gunn revealed that character introductions were the "hardest scenes to crack", with Thanos' introduction being the most difficult. He felt that "having Thanos be in that scene was more helpful to the [MCU] than it was to Guardians of the Galaxy," yet he still wanted Thanos in the film, without "[belittling] the actual antagonist of the film, which is Ronan". To solve his dilemma, Gunn chose to have Ronan kill "The Other", Thanos' vizier, saying, "I thought that was interesting, because we've had the Other, who's obviously very powerful even in comparison to Loki, and then we see Ronan wipe his ass with him. So that I liked, but even that was sort of difficult, because it played as funnier when I first wrote it, and the humor didn't work so much". Perlman's original script had Thanos as the main villain of the film, but Whedon asked Gunn if he could not have Thanos as the main antagonist and Gunn agreed, reducing Thanos' role in the plot.

=== Pre-production ===
In September 2012, Gunn confirmed that he had signed on to direct the film and rewrite the script. By the end of November, Joel Edgerton, Jack Huston, Jim Sturgess, and Eddie Redmayne signed deals to test for the role of Peter Quill, as did Lee Pace, which he confirmed a week later in early December. Other actors who were considered for the role included Thor: The Dark World (2013) actor Zachary Levi, Adam Brody, Joseph Gordon-Levitt, Michael Rosenbaum, and John Gallagher Jr. Chris Pratt was cast in the role in February 2013, as part of a multi-film deal that he signed with Marvel. Glenn Howerton was Gunn's second choice for the role.

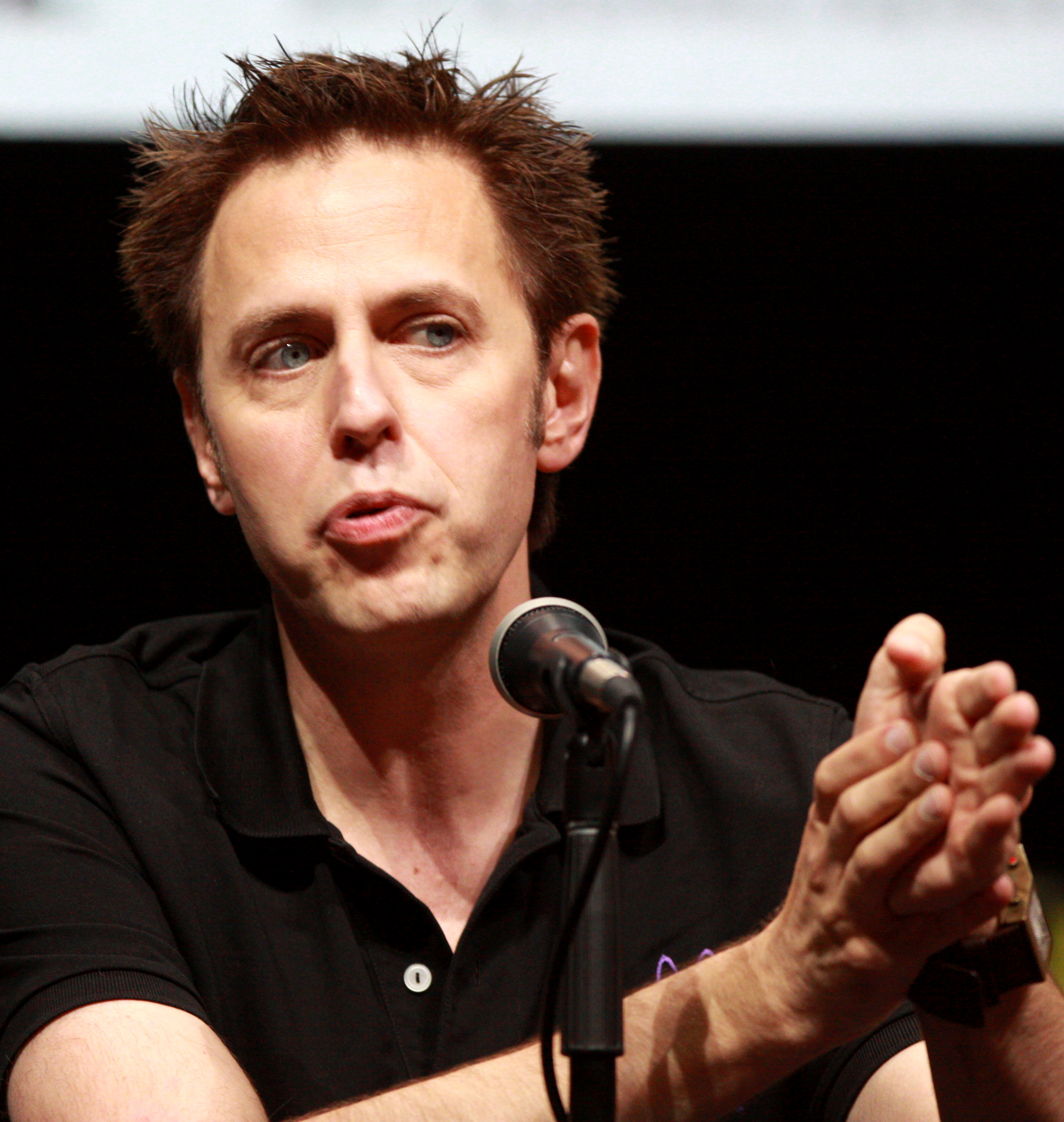
Gunn promoting the film at the 2013 San Diego Comic-Con

In January 2013, filming was scheduled to take place at Shepperton Studios in London, United Kingdom, and Marvel Studios announced that the film would be released in 3D. Victoria Alonso, an executive producer on the film, said that filming would begin in June. She also said that both Rocket Raccoon and Groot would be created through a combination of CGI and motion capture, going on to say that "You can't do any motion capture with a raccoon—they won't let you put the suit on. But we will do rotomation, probably, for some of the behavior ... we definitely will have performers to emulate what James Gunn will lead to be, the behavior and the performance. He's very clear on where he wants to take the characters." In March 2013, Feige discussed Guardians of the Galaxy in relation to the Marvel Cinematic Universe, saying, "It's much more of a standalone film. It takes place in the same universe. And when we've been on the other side of that universe in other movies, you might see those characteristics in Guardians, but the Avengers are not involved with what's happening out there at this time." Feige also stated that 95% of the film would take place in space. In mid-March, Dave Bautista was signed to play Drax the Destroyer. Other actors who had been considered for the role included Isaiah Mustafa, Brian Patrick Wade, Jason Momoa, and Chadwick Boseman. Momoa chose not to continue after auditioning, feeling the character was too similar to other parts he had played in the past, and he did not want to further add to his typecasting as the "brute" character. By the following week, sculptor Brian Muir, who sculpted Darth Vader's mask for Star Wars (1977), was revealed to be working on the film.

In early April 2013, Zoe Saldaña entered into negotiations to star as Gamora in the film, and it was confirmed she had been cast later that month. Amanda Seyfried had been offered the role, but declined due to the excessive hours of make-up required for the role, and her uncertainty over the film's commercial viability. Lupita Nyong'o also auditioned for the role. Also in April, Michael Rooker joined the film's cast as Yondu Udonta, and it was announced that Ophelia Lovibond had been cast in a supporting role. By this point in time, Lee Pace was in final negotiations to play the villain of the film. In May, Marvel offered John C. Reilly the role of Rhomann Dey. At the same time, it was disclosed that filmmakers were looking at actors including Hugh Laurie, Alan Rickman, and Ken Watanabe, for another role, and that Christopher Markus and Stephen McFeely were providing finishing touches to the script. A few days later, Glenn Close was cast as the head of the Nova Corps in the film, followed shortly by the casting of Karen Gillan as the film's lead female villain. By June 2013, Benicio del Toro was cast in the film, as part of a multi-film deal with Marvel Studios. Later in the month, it was confirmed that Reilly had been cast as Rhomann Dey.

Special effects makeup designer David White took head and body casts of actors, such as Bautista, to experiment with materials used to create the characters. White said, "James always pushed for practical and makeup effects. He wanted, like me, to see the real deal there on set." White was careful not to use "modern" creature designs to ensure they did not fall short in Gunn's uniquely envisioned world. White and his team created upwards of 1,000 prosthetic makeup applications and 2,000 molds of different-colored aliens. For the specific aesthetic look to the film, Gunn wanted to create "a colorful science-fiction world", and include elements of 1950s and '60s pulp movies, citing the Ravagers' spaceships, which he compared to muscle cars, as an example of the latter. Science fiction artist Chris Foss inspired and helped design the final look of some of the spacecrafts that appear in the film. The Mass Effect video game series, Flash Gordon, Farscape and Star Wars were primary inspirations for Gunn on the film.

=== Filming ===
Principal photography began around July 6, 2013, in London, United Kingdom, under the working title of Full Tilt. Filming took place at Shepperton Studios and Longcross Studios. Later in July, Gunn and the film's cast flew from London to attend San Diego Comic-Con, where it was revealed that Pace would play Ronan the Accuser, Gillan would be Nebula, del Toro as the Collector, and that Djimon Hounsou had been cast as Korath. Close was later revealed to play Nova Prime Irani Rael. Also at San Diego Comic-Con, Feige stated that Thanos would be a part of the film as the "mastermind". On August 11, 2013, filming began at London's Millennium Bridge, which was selected as a double for Xandar. In August 2013, Marvel announced that Bradley Cooper would voice Rocket. On September 3, 2013, Gunn said that filming was "a little over half[way]" complete. Also in September, Vin Diesel stated that he was voicing Groot. However, Marvel did not confirm Diesel's involvement in the film at the time. On October 12, 2013, Gunn announced on social media that filming had completed.

Director of photography Ben Davis used Arri Alexa XT cameras for the film, saying, "I'm traditionally a photochemical fan, but going with the digital format was the right way for this movie ... the Alexa [provided] the right look for this particular film". During the opening scenes in the 1980s, Davis chose JDC Cooke Xtal (Crystal) Express anamorphic prime lenses because they "had more anamorphic artifacts and aberrations, which [he] felt added something". Davis used spherical Panavision Primos for the rest of the film. Additionally, Davis worked closely with production designer Charles Wood to achieve the correct lighting looks for each scene. Dealing with two fully CGI characters forced Davis to shoot scenes multiple times, usually once with the references for the characters and once without them in the shot.

Gunn revealed that his brother, Sean Gunn, took on multiple roles during the filming process, such as standing in for Rocket, which he noted was beneficial for the other actors, including Saldaña, Pratt, and Bautista, who responded positively to Sean and his on-set performances. Sean was first hired to play Kraglin Obfonteri, but James hired him as a stand-in on set for Rocket because he knew he could trust in him until they could figure out how to portray Rocket, though they knew Sean would not voice the character, with Cooper being cast to voice Rocket very late in development. Special effects makeup designer David White made two life-size versions of Rocket and a bust of Groot as aids for visual effects, with White saying, "it gives [the filmmakers] a good indication of where visual effects needs to pick up and whether Rocket can actually reach certain things or use certain devices". These busts were also used to see how the on-set lighting would affect the characters, to assist with the visual effects lighting process.

In January 2015, Disney revealed that the film came in "slightly over the agreed budget" at $232.3 million, with Disney receiving a rebate of $36.4 million from the British government. It was previously estimated to have had a $170 million budget.

=== Post-production ===
In November 2013, Gunn stated that he attempted to use as many practical effects as possible while filming to aid the use of CGI and motion capture during post-production, saying, "Our sets are enormous. We have a prison that is 350,000 pounds of steel. Anybody who knows me knows I love the mix of practical and CGI effects ... I can't wait for people to see it, because it's astonishingly beautiful." After the release of Thor: The Dark World, Feige stated that the Infinity Stones would be a focus in the film, as well as going forward into the Phase Three slate of films within the MCU. Gunn originally wrote the scene of the Collector explaining about the origins of the Infinity Stones in one hour and a half, only to then be told by Marvel Studios that they were incidentally thinking about including the Power Stone in his film, an idea that Gunn found cool to use, thus subsequent MCU filmmakers involved in the long-planned story of Avengers: Infinity War (2018) based themselves on Gunn's backstory for the Stones. In a separate interview for The Dark World in November, Feige added that a third, unknown Infinity Stone would be seen in the film, referred to as the "Power Stone" by the Collector. The mid-credits scene in The Dark World revealed Lovibond's role as the Collector's slave, later named Carina. In December 2013, Marvel confirmed that Diesel would voice Groot.

A few weeks of additional filming, involving the film's main cast and crew, occurred in March 2014 at Walt Disney Studios in Burbank, California. In April 2014, Gunn described Thanos as the "head of the snake" in the film, and confirmed he would appear via performance capture. In May 2014, Gunn stated that the film features an "enormous" amount of smaller and minor characters from the Marvel Universe, adding that he felt the film had the most characters overall of any Marvel Studios film to date. Costume supervisor Dan Grace added to this by saying, "We really, really get the feeling of the scale and scope of the galaxy. We visit five planets, we see a hundred different races." The film introduces the alien race Sakaaran, who act as Ronan's mercenaries, as a replacement to the Badoon, as the Badoon film rights belonged to 20th Century Fox.

By the end of May, Josh Brolin was revealed as the voice of Thanos, with Feige confirming in July that Brolin also provided the performance capture for the character. Whedon assisted Gunn as well in casting Brolin. Brolin was filming Everest (2015) when Marvel Studios approached him to play Thanos with information about the character, explaining to him that his role in Guardians would consist of a cameo appearance, with larger roles planned for later installments. Feige explained that Brolin was "totally intrigued" when approached for the role, having been a fan of Marvel Studios' past films. Thanos communicates via hologram for much of the film, though he does appear in a scene with Ronan and Nebula. In June 2014, Feige added that Thanos and his followers are "the biggest piece of connective tissue that will eventually lead us back into Avengers films in the future".

On July 7, 2014, Gunn announced on social media that he had completed work on the film. In August, regarding the post-credit scene, Gunn revealed that the scene did not involve Howard the Duck when it was originally filmed, rather he was added during post-production, a decision made by "some combination of [Gunn] and the editor Fred Raskin". As the decision to add the character was made late in the post-production process, he had to be designed that day, before being handed off to Sony Pictures Imageworks to animate. Also in August, regarding the pre-credit scene of Baby Groot dancing, Gunn stated that he himself danced to provide motion reference for the animators, and that the decision was made to place the scene before the credits, rather than during or after them, because of positive responses from a test audience, which made Marvel and Gunn feel that they did not want "people walking out and missing this thing". Another late change halfway in production came when Marvel decided that the Reality Stone would be red in The Dark World. Because the Power Stone was originally meant to be red as well, Gunn was asked to change its color from red to purple, which he accepted as, by his own admission, liked that color more. Marvel used design firm Sarofsky once again for the film's title sequences, after liking their work for Captain America: The Winter Soldier (2014). Sarofsky developed a custom typeface based on the font used in the teaser posters for the opening credits, which was tinted orange to offer a better contrast to the film's blue and gray imagery. One of the typography solutions offered before the final product wound up being repurposed as the locator cards seen throughout the film.

==== Visual effects ====
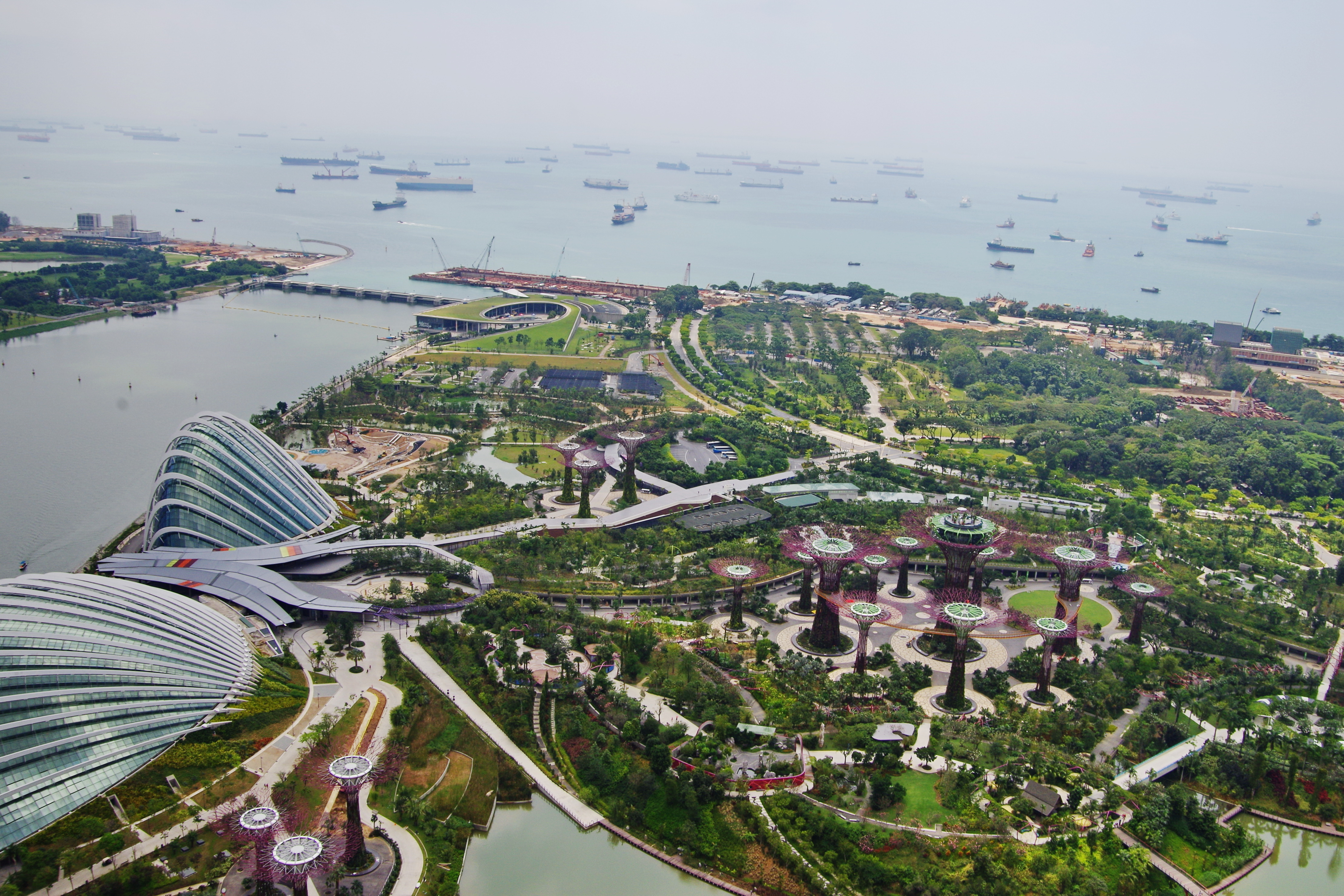
The Gardens by the Bay (top) in Singapore helped inspire the look of the planet Xandar (bottom).

The film featured 2,750 visual effects shots, which make up approximately 90% of the film. The visual effects were created by: Moving Picture Company (MPC), who worked on creating Groot, as well as Morag, Xandar, the Dark Aster and the final battle on Xandar; Framestore, who worked on creating Rocket, extending the Kyln prison set and constructing Knowhere; Luma Pictures, who worked on Thanos; Method Studios, who worked on creating the Orb opening and revealing its powers, as well as the holographic displays at the Nova Corps command center; Lola VFX; Cantina Creative; Sony Pictures Imageworks, who worked on Howard the Duck and creating the Dark Aster shots with MPC; CoSA VFX; Secret Lab; Rise Visual Effects Studios; and Technicolor VFX. Pre- and post-visualizations were done by Proof and The Third Floor, with Proof also contributing to the creation of Rocket and Groot.

Producer Nik Korda noted how helpful it was to have Sean Gunn and Krystian Godlewski portray Rocket and Groot on set, as it provided references for lighting and on-set performances to the animators. When creating Groot, MPC realized early on that his eyes would be essential in maintaining the character's human qualities, as his face couldn't move in the way that humans' do. MPC visual effects supervisor Nicolas Aithadi explained that, "When you look at humans what makes the eyes interesting is the imperfections—trying to make these two irises not aimed at the same place—trying to make them strange and look more human." Textures for Groot came from a number of sources, including inspiration from a botanical garden in London, and the character was modeled as individual branches, rigged individually, to simulate a muscle system for the character.

One of the major challenges for Framestore in creating Rocket was his fur. Framestore's Rachel Williams explained that, since "raccoon fur is made up from a layer of short fine hair and a layer of longer thicker hairs", these layers were separated and animated individually, removing the need to use "guide hairs" to control the movements of thick sections of fur. Framestore and MPC worked closely sharing assets, to ensure shots of Rocket at MPC would match the Rocket created by Framestore, and vice versa for when Groot was needed by the other studio.

To give Thanos "the performance and the weight that he deserved", Luma Pictures created a new facial animation system to re-create Josh Brolin as a fully CG character, using his "eyes, some of his cheek, how his muscles move when he talks". The character's large jaw, and the deep grooves that run down his face, had "to be carefully planned out with the movement of his face".

== Music ==
In August 2013, Gunn revealed that Tyler Bates would be composing the film's score. Gunn stated that Bates would write some of the score first so that he can film to the music, as opposed to scoring to the film. In February 2014, Gunn revealed that the film would incorporate songs from the 1960s and 1970s, such as "Hooked on a Feeling", on a mixtape in Quill's Walkman, which acts as a way for him to stay connected to the Earth, home, and family he lost. In May 2014, Gunn added that using the songs from the '60s and '70s were "cultural reference points", saying, "It's striking the balance throughout the whole movie, through something that is very unique, but also something that is easily accessible to people at the same time. The music and the Earth stuff is one of those touchstones that we have to remind us that, yeah, [Quill] is a real person from planet Earth who's just like you and me. Except that he's in this big outer space adventure."

When choosing the songs, Gunn revealed he "started the process by reading the Billboard charts for all of the top hits of the '70s", downloading "a few hundred" songs that were "semi-familiar—ones you recognize but might not be able to name off the top of your head" and creating a playlist for all the songs that would fit the film tonally. He added that he "would listen to the playlist on my speakers around the house—sometimes I would be inspired to create a scene around a song, and other times I had a scene that needed music and I would listen through the playlist, visualizing various songs, figuring out which would work the best." Most of the songs were played on set to help "the actors and the camera operators find the perfect groove for the shot", with David Bowie's "Moonage Daydream" the only song chosen and added during post-production. Gunn also said that the opening scenes were designed with "Hooked on a Feeling" in mind; however, once Gunn discovered "Come and Get Your Love", the song used in the sequence, Gunn felt it was a "better fit."

Three albums were released by Hollywood Records on July 29, 2014: The film's score, Guardians of the Galaxy (Original Score), which features the music composed by Bates for the film; Guardians of the Galaxy: Awesome Mix Vol. 1 (Original Motion Picture Soundtrack), which comprises the twelve songs from Quill's mixtape; and a deluxe edition featuring both albums. By August 2014, the album which mirrored Quill's mixtape had reached the top of the Billboard 200 chart, becoming the first soundtrack album in history consisting entirely of previously released songs to top the chart. Hollywood Records also released a cassette version of the Awesome Mix Vol. 1 soundtrack on November 28, 2014, as an exclusive to Record Store Day participants. The cassette, which is the first cassette Disney Music Group has released since 2003, comes with a digital download version of the album.

== Marketing ==
=== Promotion ===
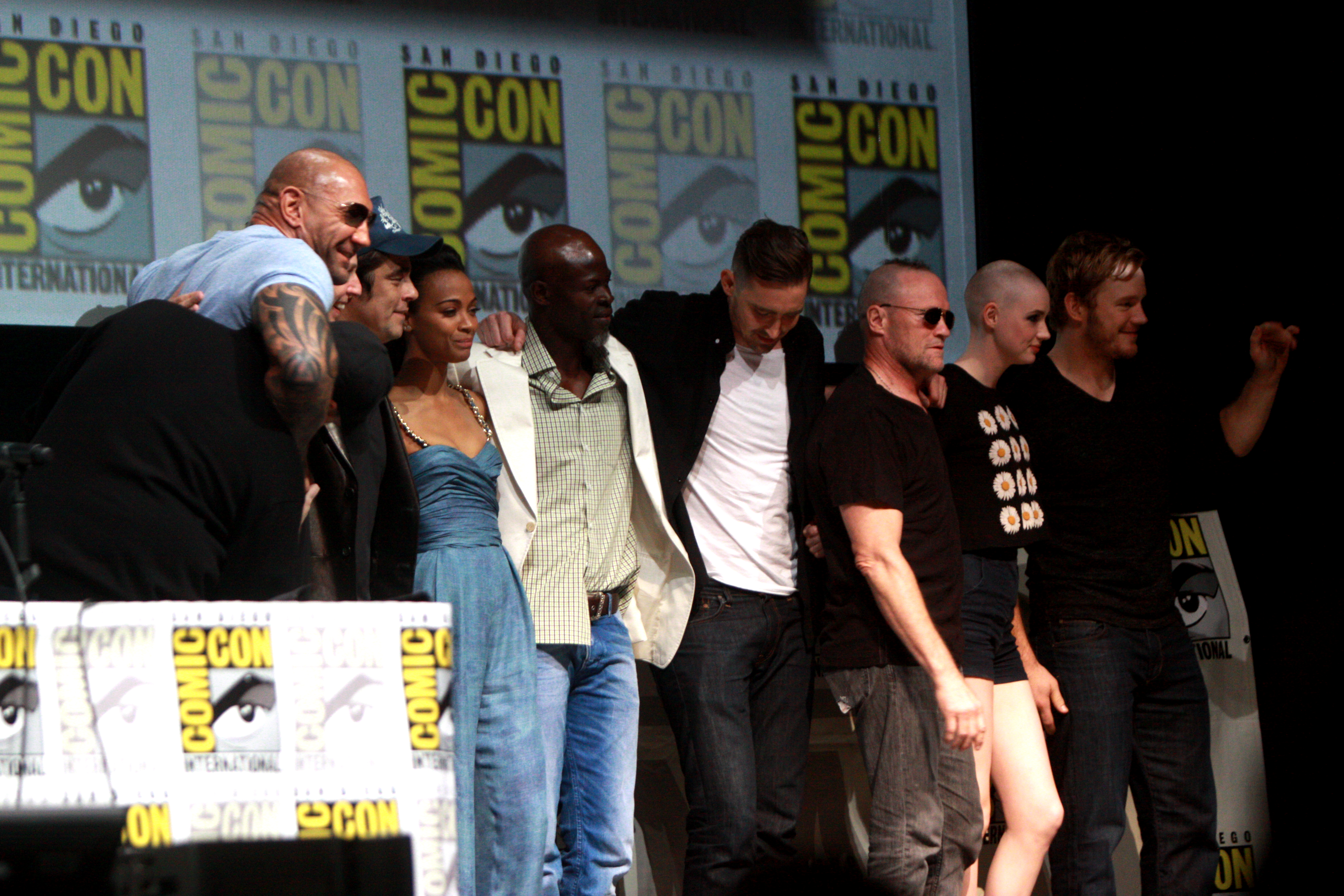
The cast and crew of Guardians of the Galaxy at the 2013 San Diego Comic-Con (L-R: producer Kevin Feige, Bautista, director James Gunn, del Toro, Saldaña, Hounsou, Pace, Rooker, Gillan, and Pratt)

At Disney's D23 Expo in August 2013, Feige presented footage first revealed at San Diego Comic-Con in July 2013. The first trailer for the film debuted on Jimmy Kimmel Live! on February 18, 2014, with a special introduction by Chris Pratt. The Los Angeles Times said the trailer delivered "some spirited alien action, with exploding spaceships and muscled bad guys, not to mention a few purely comedic moments," while spotlighting "a number of the offbeat characters." Total Film noted the similarity of the trailer's opening clip to the 1981 film, Raiders of the Lost Ark, which Gunn stated was a big influence for Guardians, and made note of the "edgy" humor used throughout. Total Film also noted the similarity of the trailer to the one debuted at Comic-Con and D23, with a few new shots featuring Nebula and the Collector. Social media response to the trailer was strong, with 88,000 mentions across Twitter, Facebook and various blogs in a 12-hour period. Those numbers were comparable to trailers for other superhero films like Man of Steel and The Amazing Spider-Man 2, and noteworthy for the late night-time period in which it premiered. The trailer received 22.8 million views in the 24 hours after it debuted. After the debut of the trailer, Blue Swede's version of "Hooked on a Feeling", which was prominently used throughout the trailer, went up 700% in sales the following day. The line from Serafinowicz's character, "What a bunch of a-holes", was only intended to be featured in the trailers, but due to its positive reception, was included in the final cut of the film. Gunn noted that a different teaser was almost released "that was very cheesy [and] sold the movie as something different than what it was", as it tested better than the version that was ultimately released. Gunn credited the marketing teams at Marvel and Disney for having faith in the latter version, despite how it tested, over choosing the version that would have mis-marketed the film.

In March 2014, the Agents of S.H.I.E.L.D. episode "T.A.H.I.T.I." introduced the Kree race to the MCU, which began a storyline that recurs throughout the series and involves finding a hidden Kree city. Also in March, ABC aired a one-hour television special titled, Marvel Studios: Assembling a Universe, which included a sneak peek of Guardians of the Galaxy. Starting in April 2014, a two-part comic was released, titled Marvel's Guardians of the Galaxy Prelude. Written by Dan Abnett and Andy Lanning, with art by Wellington Alves, the first issue focused on the background of Nebula and her bond with Thanos; the second issue featured the adventures of Rocket and Groot before they join forces with the other Guardians. In June 2014, Mike Pasciullo, senior VP of Marvel Studios, described the marketing approach for Guardians of the Galaxy by saying that Marvel had "built a robust marketing program for the theatrical release that carefully integrates traditional advertising, social media, digital marketing, strategic promotional partnerships, organic entertainment integrations [and] publicity."

In July 2014, Marvel launched a viral marketing campaign for the film called "Galaxy Getaways", a fictional travel website that allows users to book passage to some of the planets depicted in the film, including Xandar, Morag, and Knowhere. Beginning July 4, 2014, a sneak peek of the film was presented at Disneyland and Disney's Hollywood Studios in the Magic Eye and ABC Sound Studio theaters, respectively. Approximately 14 minutes of the film was screened on July 7, 2014, in IMAX 3D in the United States, and 3D theaters and IMAX 3D in Canada, along with two trailers. The screening was met with positive reviews, praising the humor, the 3D, and IMAX conversion, and Cooper's portrayal of Rocket. However, it was criticized for beginning partway through the film, not allowing viewers to easily acclimate to the film's tone, and for how the general audience might respond to a film within the MCU without established characters making appearances.

On July 12, 2014, Gunn and the actors from the film promoted Guardians of the Galaxy at the Lido 8 Cineplex in Singapore. On July 17, 2014, Disney Interactive released an action RPG video game titled Guardians of the Galaxy: The Universal Weapon for iOS, Android and Windows devices. The game's original story was written by Dan Abnett, and was meant to complement the film. On July 21, Pratt, Saldaña, Bautista, Diesel, and Cooper appeared on Jimmy Kimmel Live! to promote the film and debut some additional exclusive content. On July 29, Pratt and Saldaña rang the opening bell of the New York Stock Exchange as part of the film's marketing strategy.

On August 14, Marvel released the scene of Groot dancing, which was shortly followed by an announcement from Funko that they were releasing a toy "Dancing Groot". The Hollywood Reporter noted that the quick release of the scene from Marvel two weeks after the film's theatrical release, along with the rush announcement from Funko, indicated the popularity of both the character and the scene. The scene also produced the word "grooting", coined by Michael Rooker, in which a person dances similar to Groot, with the word entering the social media lexicon. Also in August, Marvel held a special screening of the film at Children's Hospital Los Angeles, where Pratt dressed as Star-Lord to entertain the patients.

=== Merchandise ===
In June 2012, Marvel filed eleven trademark applications for Guardians of the Galaxy, covering a variety of consumer products, from video games to cosmetics. Disney Consumer Products partnered with Mad Engine, C-Life, New Era, Hasbro, Disguise, Rubies, Sideshow Collectibles, Lego, KIDdesigns, iHome, Funko, Freeze, Fast Forward, and Innovative Designs to produce merchandise for the film, with releases starting in June 2014. Mad Engine and C-Life were partnered as the core apparel outfitters, producing a line of T-shirts and fleece jackets, while New Era produced headwear and hats. Hasbro produced toys for the film; Disguise and Rubies produced the costumes; and Sideshow Collectibles was given charge of the collectibles. Lego announced three toy sets based on scenes from the film, while iHome created character speakers, Funko made vinyl bobbleheads, Freeze crafted 1980s-inspired apparel, and backpacks and stationery were made by Fast Forward and Innovative Designs. Despite first films in a potential new franchise usually being off-limits to licensees, Marvel used Iron Man's success as evidence of unknown characters becoming hits with audiences to attract partnerships. Licensees embraced Rocket as the film's potential breakout character, with Drax and Gamora being used for older demographics; Star-Lord's obsession with 1980s nostalgia, including his "Awesome Mix Vo. 1" cassette, has also served as a basis for tie-in products. In August 2014, Funko announced a toy based on "Dancing Groot", while in October 2014, Marvel and KID designs announced a replica of dancing Groot, for release in December 2014.

In December 2014, Disney made a second marketing push, to coincide with the film's home media release with additional merchandise. Merchandise partners included: KID designs with its replica dancing Groot; Funko's Fabrikations line with a plush Rocket; Mattel's Hot Wheels character cars; C-Life, Hybrid-Jem Sportswear, Freeze, MZ Berger, Accutime, AME and Her Universe with apparel; ThinkGeek with jewelry and watches; American Greetings with cards; Jay Franco with homegoods; and Vandor with drinkware. Additional partners included Mad Engine, Just Play, and Dragon Models. Paul Gitter, senior vice-president of Marvel licensing at Disney Consumer Products said, "The demand for Guardians of the Galaxy merchandise has been truly out of this world. Our merchandising and retail partners are doing a tremendous job of providing creative and innovative ways for fans to continue interacting with these popular characters and showcase their fandom year round."

== Release ==
=== Theatrical ===
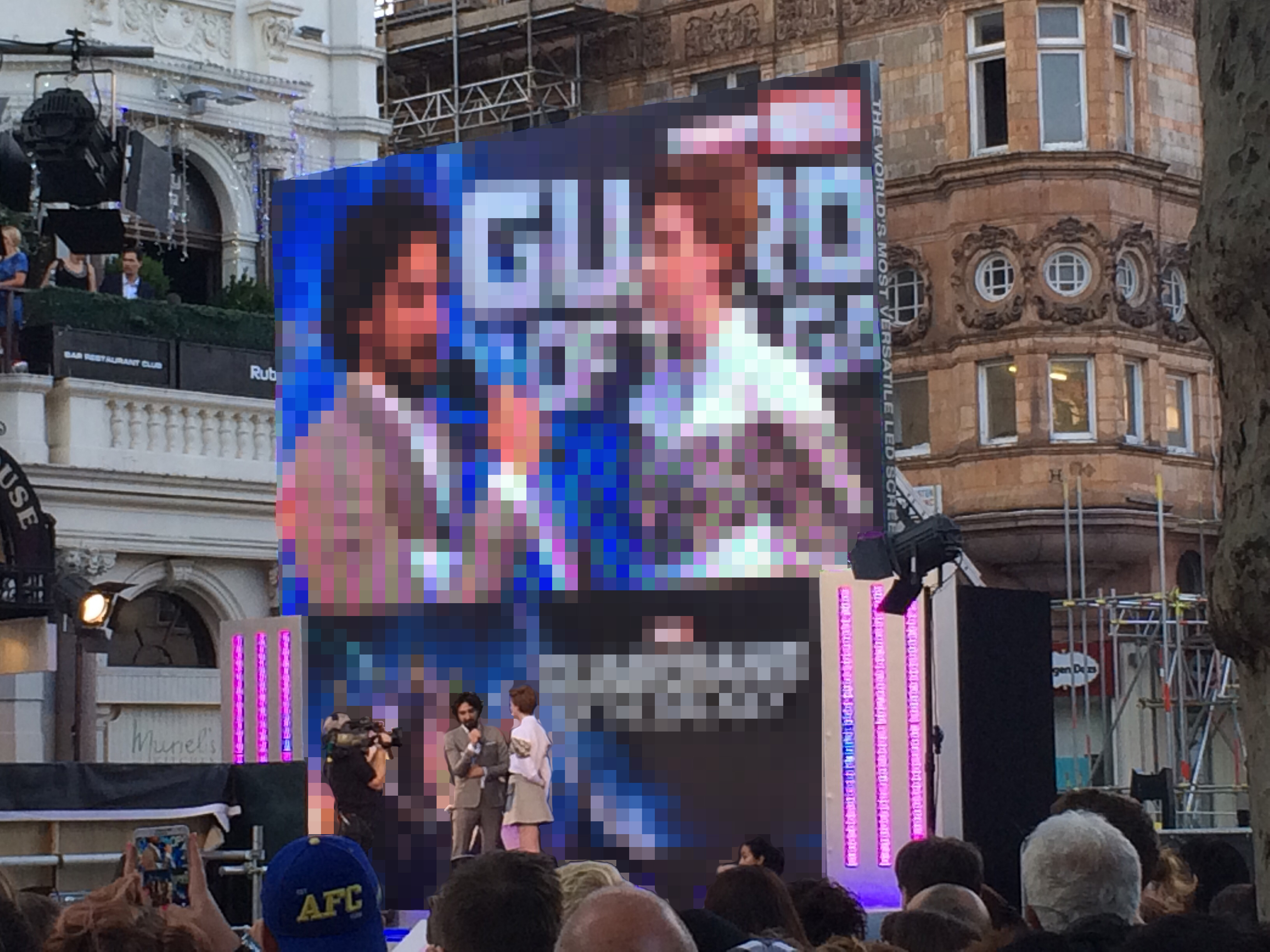
Karen Gillan at the London premiere of Guardians of the Galaxy

The world premiere of Guardians of the Galaxy was held on July 21, 2014, at the Dolby Theatre in Hollywood, Los Angeles. The film was released theatrically in the United Kingdom on July 31, 2014, and in the United States on August 1, in 3D and IMAX 3D. The film was released in 4,080 theaters in the United States, making it the widest August release, breaking the five-year record held by G.I. Joe: The Rise of Cobra (4,007 theaters). The breakdown of venues was: 354 IMAX screens, 3,200 3D screens, 350 large format screens, and 240 D-Box screens. In its sixth weekend, Guardians of the Galaxy was playing in 69 territories, its most. The film is part of Phase Two of the MCU.

In June 2014, Gunn stated that the film had always been planned as a 3D film, and "Unlike many directors, I've been actively involved with converting every shot to 3D, making sure it works perfectly for the story and the film, making sure it's spectacular and immersive without being silly, distracting, or overly showy." Gunn also revealed that the IMAX 3D version would include shifting aspect ratios, to make the viewing experience "even fuller and more encompassing. I've personally chosen all the places where the changes occur ... The changing aspect ratios in this case are actually a part of the storytelling." In July 2014, Gunn revealed that there were multiple scenes he had cut from the film, and he was investigating how to release them, either in an extended cut of the film, or as bonus features on the film's home media release.

=== Home media ===
Guardians of the Galaxy was released for digital download by Walt Disney Studios Home Entertainment on November 18, 2014, and on Blu-ray, Blu-ray 3D, and DVD on November 24, 2014, in the United Kingdom and on December 9 in the United States. The digital and Blu-ray releases include behind-the-scenes featurettes, audio commentary, deleted scenes, a blooper reel, and an exclusive preview of Avengers: Age of Ultron. As of October 4, 2015, the film has earned over $118 million in sales in the US.

The film was also included in the 13-disc box set, titled "Marvel Cinematic Universe: Phase Two Collection", which includes all of the Phase Two films in the Marvel Cinematic Universe. It was released on December 8, 2015. The IMAX Enhanced version of the film was made available on Disney+ beginning on November 12, 2021.

== Reception ==
"We wanted to do a space movie, and we loved the Guardians comics. Just the ridiculous pairing of a tree and a raccoon. It was before Star Wars came back with a vengeance. It was like, "Let's try a big space movie, the kind of which hasn't been around for a while." The audience is following us to these places. The success of Ant-Man and Doctor Strange helped us go, "Hey, the audience is with us," and Guardians is probably the best example of how far they [the audience] are willing to go."

— Kevin Feige, President of Marvel Studios, on the success of the first Guardians of the Galaxy film

=== Box office ===
Guardians of the Galaxy earned $333.7 million in North America and an estimated $439.6 million in other countries, for a worldwide total of $773.3 million. The film became the third-highest-grossing film in the Marvel Cinematic Universe, behind The Avengers and Iron Man 3. It was the third-highest-grossing 2014 film (behind Transformers: Age of Extinction and The Hobbit: The Battle of the Five Armies) and the highest-grossing superhero film of 2014. It had a worldwide opening weekend of $160.7 million. Deadline Hollywood calculated the film's net profit as $204.2 million, accounting for production budgets, marketing, talent participations, and other costs; box office grosses and home media revenues placed it fifth on their list of 2014's "Most Valuable Blockbusters".

==== North America ====
Guardians of the Galaxy earned $11.2 million on its Thursday night pre-opening, surpassing Captain America: The Winter Soldier's gross ($10.2 million) for the biggest Thursday evening start for a movie in 2014. IMAX accounted for 17% of the total gross ($1.9 million), which was the biggest August pre-release in IMAX format. On its opening day, the film earned $37.8 million, including the Thursday night earnings. Guardians of the Galaxy was the number one movie during its opening weekend and grossed $94.3 million, setting an August weekend record, surpassing The Bourne Ultimatum. During the opening weekend, IMAX earnings amounted to $11.7 million and 3-D showings accounted for 45% of ticket sales. The film's success was partially attributed to its appeal to both genders: the opening-weekend audience was 44% female, which is the biggest proportion ever for a MCU film; 55% of the opening-weekend audience was over the age of 25.

Although the film fell to second place in its second and third weekends, behind Teenage Mutant Ninja Turtles, the film was number one in its fourth, fifth, and sixth weekends. By doing so, it became the first film in 2014 to top the domestic box office in non-consecutive weeks, the first film of the summer (May–August) to be the number one film in three weekends and the first MCU film to be the top film for four weeks, surpassing Captain America: The Winter Soldier and The Avengers, both of which were number one for three weeks, and tied The Dark Knight for the most weeks at number one among comic book-based films. Phil Contrino, vice president and chief analyst of BoxOffice.com felt Guardians success was "unconventional" and was "shattering expectations". The film remained in the top 10 for ten weekends.

The film was the top-grossing film of summer 2014, first of 2014 to pass $300 million for its domestic gross, and was the third-highest-grossing domestic film of 2014 (behind American Sniper and The Hunger Games: Mockingjay – Part 1). The film was said to have "injected life" into an otherwise lower-than-normal summer box office.

==== Other territories ====
Guardians of the Galaxy was released in 42 international markets and grossed $66.4 million on its opening weekend. The biggest debuts came from Russia ($13 million), the United Kingdom ($10.8 million), Mexico ($6.5 million), Brazil ($6.5 million), and South Korea ($4.7 million). The film topped the weekend box office two times, in its first and second weekends. In its eleventh weekend, the film opened in China, earning $29.8 million, its largest, and became the third-highest opening in the country for any Disney release, behind Iron Man 3 and Captain America: The Winter Soldier, and was an all-time industry record opening in October. The following weekend saw an additional $21.3 million from China, making China the highest-grossing market with $69 million. The film's three biggest markets in total earnings were: China ($96.5 million), the UK ($47.4 million), and Russia ($37.5 million).

=== Critical response ===
The review aggregator Rotten Tomatoes reported an approval rating of 91%, with an average score of 7.8/10, based on 337 reviews. The website's consensus reads, "Guardians of the Galaxy is just as irreverent as fans of the frequently zany Marvel comic would expect—as well as funny, thrilling, full of heart, and packed with visual splendor." Metacritic gave the film a weighted average score of 76 out of 100, based on 53 critics, indicating "generally favorable" reviews. Audiences polled by CinemaScore gave the film an average grade of "A" on an A+ to F scale, while earning an "A+" among under-18 and 25- to 34-year-old viewers.

Scott Foundas of Variety said "James Gunn's presumptive franchise-starter is overlong, overstuffed, and sometimes too eager to please, but the cheeky comic tone keeps things buoyant—as does Chris Pratt's winning performance", and praised the film's look created by cinematographer Ben Davis, production designer Charles Wood, and special effects makeup designer David White. Justin Lowe of The Hollywood Reporter also praised the film's look, and felt "A well-matched ensemble rises to the challenge of launching a heroic origin film with distinctive style, abundant thrills, and no shortage of humor." The Daily Telegraph's Robbie Collin said, "A brand new summer family blockbuster this may be, but it plays by old, half-forgotten rules; trimming out the clutter and cross-referencing for snappy, streamlined, Saturday-cartoon fun". Kenneth Turan of the Los Angeles Times said, "Blessed with a loose, anarchic B-picture soul that encourages you to enjoy yourself even when you're not quite sure what's going on, the scruffy Guardians is irreverent in a way that can bring the first Star Wars to mind, in part because it has some of the most unconventional heroes this side of the Mos Eisley cantina." Manohla Dargis of The New York Times said, "While Guardians takes you down one after another crazy narrative turn, it also pulls you into—and, for the most part, keeps you in—a fully realized other world." Richard Roeper of the Chicago Sun-Times said, "Guardians of the Galaxy is a late summer treat—a mostly lighthearted and self-referential comic-book movie with loads of whiz-bang action, some laugh-out-loud moments, and a couple of surprisingly beautiful and touching scenes as well," calling it "a refreshing confection of entertainment".

Jake Coyle of the Associated Press was more critical of the film, calling it "terribly overstuffed and many of the jokes get drowned out by the special effects ... The pervasive movie references detract from the stab at freshness, and Guardians depends all too much on the whimsy of '70s anthems for an original beat." He also felt that Close, Reilly, and del Toro were underused in the film. Mick LaSalle of the San Francisco Chronicle said, "In place of wit, Guardians offers a sort of generalized willingness to be amusing, an atmosphere of high spirits that feels like lots of people pumping air into a tire that has a hole in it. Everyone is clearly working, but nothing is really happening—and yet the effort is so evident that there's an impulse to reward it." The film received mixed reviews in China, according to state media outlet China Daily, where viewers complained that the film's "poor subtitle translation not only spoiled the fun of watching it, but also made it difficult to understand its humor". Jim Starlin, creator of Drax, Gamora, and Thanos, said it "might be Marvel's best movie yet". Director Steven Spielberg said that the film was the superhero film "that impressed [him] most" as it does "not take itself too seriously". He felt he had "seen something new in [superhero] movies [from the film], without any cynicism, or fear of being dark when needed".

In 2017, Guardians of the Galaxy was featured as one of the 100 greatest films of all time in Empire magazine's poll of The 100 Greatest Movies, as the highest MCU film on the list.

=== Accolades ===
At the 87th Academy Awards, Guardians of the Galaxy received nominations for Best Makeup and Hairstyling and Best Visual Effects. The film's other nominations include an Annie Award, two British Academy Film Awards, and five Critics' Choice Movie Awards (winning two).

== Sequels and special ==
=== Guardians of the Galaxy Vol. 2 ===
Guardians of the Galaxy Vol. 2 was released on May 5, 2017, again written and directed by James Gunn. Pratt, Saldaña, Bautista, Diesel, Cooper, Rooker, Gillan, and Sean Gunn all reprise their roles in the film, and are joined by Pom Klementieff as Mantis, Elizabeth Debicki as Ayesha, Chris Sullivan as Taserface, and Kurt Russell as Quill's father Ego.

=== The Guardians of the Galaxy Holiday Special ===
The Guardians of the Galaxy Holiday Special is a Marvel Studios Special Presentation that was released on Disney+ on November 25, 2022, with Gunn writing and directing. Pratt, Bautista, Diesel, Cooper, Gillan, Klementieff, Rooker, and Sean Gunn reprise their roles in the special, which is set before the events of Vol. 3.

=== Guardians of the Galaxy Vol. 3 ===
Guardians of the Galaxy Vol. 3 was released on May 5, 2023, with Gunn returning to write and direct. Pratt, Saldaña, Bautista, Diesel, Cooper, Gillan, Klementieff, and Sean Gunn reprise their roles in the film, and are joined by Will Poulter as Adam Warlock, Maria Bakalova as Cosmo the Spacedog, and Chukwudi Iwuji as Rocket's creator, the High Evolutionary.

== See also ==
- List of films featuring extraterrestrials
- "What If... T'Challa Became a Star-Lord?", an episode of the MCU television series What If...? that reimagines the events of this film
