= Adam Ciralsky =

American journalist, television and film producer and attorney

- Born: September 22, 1971 (age 54)
- Education: George Washington University, B.A. University of Illinois, J.D.
- Occupation: Journalist
- Years active: 1999–present

Adam Ciralsky (born September 22, 1971) is an American journalist, television and film producer and attorney. Many of his original reports have been optioned and adapted for film and television through his production company P3 Media. In 2018, Ciralsky's P3 Media signed a first-look deal with ABC Studios for scripted content. In 2021, the company re-upped the deal. In September 2023, according to Variety, P3 Media received a seven-figure investment from Ready Entertainment, a company led by Martin Luther King Jr.’s daughter, Bernice A. King, and Ashley Bell. As part of the deal, Ready Entertainment and all existing and upcoming TV and film projects will be integrated into P3 Media.

Ciralsky has won many of journalism's highest honors including three Emmys, a Peabody Award for Significant & Meritorious Achievement in Broadcasting & Cable, a Polk Award for Outstanding Television Reporting, an Alfred I. duPont–Columbia University Award for Breaking News and Sustained Coverage, and a Loeb Award for Distinguished Business and Financial Journalism and a Barone Award for Excellence in National Affairs/Public Policy Journalism.

He is currently a contributing editor for Vanity Fair and has produced investigative stories and high-profile interviews for ABC News, CBS News' 60 Minutes, NBC News, andVice on HBO.

Before embarking on a career in journalism, Ciralsky worked for the Central Intelligence Agency (CIA) and the Office of the Secretary of Defense (OSD).

== Early life and education ==
Ciralsky grew up in Milwaukee, Wisconsin, and attended University School of Milwaukee before attending George Washington University's Elliott School of International Affairs in Washington, D.C., from which he graduated magna cum laude with a B.A. in International Affairs. His work on weapons proliferation issues landed him a research scholarship in Arms Control, Disarmament and International Security at the University of Illinois where, in 1996, he received his Juris Doctor (J.D.).

== Career ==
As a student at George Washington University, Ciralsky began work in the Pentagon's Office of Non-Proliferation Policy where, among other things, he served as a representative to interagency working group on the United Nations Special Commission on Iraq (UNSCOM).

=== CIA ===
Described as "a wunderkind of the national security establishment" Ciralsky's work caught the attention of the Central Intelligence Agency, which offered him a slot in its Legal Honors Program. During his tenure at the CIA, Ciralsky handled a variety of sensitive matters involving CIA operations and officers and was honored with an Exceptional Performance Award from Director of Central Intelligence George Tenet.

==== Lawsuit ====
In July 1997, Richard Clarke, then President Clinton's Counter-Terrorism Czar, offered Ciralsky a rotational position at the National Security Council (NSC). However, the CIA's Counterespionage Group (CEG) blocked the rotation, citing concerns about Ciralsky's "Jewish roots". Ciralsky fought the allegations and, in so doing, unearthed many documents, including, an incendiary memorandum from a top CIA official: "I'd like to know if he admits his family has actual contacts with right wing politicians like Prime Minister Netanyahu. If not contacts, then maybe his family has donated money to Israeli government causes. From my experience with rich Jewish friends from college, I would fully expect Adam's wealthy daddy to support Israeli political or social causes in some form or other, perhaps though the United Jewish Appeal."

While under investigation by the CEG, Ciralsky was subjected to a polygraph test which – one of the Agency's own documents suggests – was rigged: "[CIA Director] Tenet says this guy is out of here because of his lack of candor ... subject is scheduled for a poly. ... Once that's over, it looks like we'll be waving goodbye to our friend." Ciralsky subsequently passed a polygraph test administered by the former chief of the FBI polygraph lab.

Ciralsky subsequently sued the CIA for discrimination. The case prompted a CIA investigation of the CEG and led the Agency to hire the Anti-Defamation League to provide "sensitivity training" to CEG employees. During the case, it was revealed that Ciralsky's CIA polygraph administrator referred to him as "that little Jew bastard" when speaking to a colleague. Tenet conceded that the Agency's actions were "insensitive, inappropriate and unprofessional," and could be construed as antisemitic.

Ciralsky's 2010 deposition of CIA director George Tenet is considered unprecedented. Victoria Toensing, the former chief counsel for the Senate Select Committee on Intelligence, said that she had not heard of any such thing happening before. "Usually the agency tries to circle the wagons and protect the director from ever having to provide facts," she said, "The fact that he was privy to the gross violations that occurred here is what is significant."

After 12 years, Ciralsky withdrew his lawsuit. He said that he was not concerned about financial compensation, but wanted merely to bring facts into the public eye and to use them to spur changes in the CIA. He said that he was still "proud of [his] service with the CIA and" had "a deep and abiding respect for the organization and its mission."

=== 60 Minutes ===
Following his departure from the CIA in December 1999, Ciralsky was hired by the CBS newsmagazine 60 Minutes. His first story, "Death by Denial", which dealt with the scourge of HIV/AIDS in Africa, won a Peabody Award for Significant & Meritorious Achievement in Broadcasting & Cable. While he was at 60 Minutes, Ciralsky's stories were nominated for three Emmy Awards. During that time, he also helped track down and interview the only participant in the 1993 World Trade Center bombing to remain at large.

=== NBC News ===
In 2004, Ciralsky joined NBC News where his work covering the 2006 Lebanon War earned him his first Emmy. His multi-part series entitled Trophy, about U.S. Army efforts to scuttle an Active Protection System designed to shoot down rocket-propelled grenades (RPGs), earned Ciralsky his second Emmy as well as the George Polk Award for special achievement in journalism; specifically for “investigative and enterprise work that is original, requires digging and resourcefulness, and brings results.” The Trophy series also went on to win the Gerald Loeb Award for Distinguished Business and Financial Journalism in the Television Daily category and the Barone Award from the Radio and Television Correspondent Association (RTCA) for excellence in Washington-based reporting on national affairs and public policy.

Ciralsky followed Trophy with another multi-part series about the U.S. Army's decision to ban Dragonskin, a flexible form of body armor, and instead force soldiers to wear Army-issue body armor called Interceptor. The body armor series won Ciralsky his third Emmy award. While at NBC News, Ciralsky earned an additional four Emmy nominations.

=== Vanity Fair ===
Ciralsky became a contributing writer at Vanity Fair in 2009, later joining the masthead as contributing editor in 2018.

He has written numerous high-profile, long-form investigatory pieces for Vanity Fair, including:

- "Tycoon, Contractor, Soldier, Spy," an in-depth profile of Blackwater founder Erik Prince. (January 2010)
- "Will It Fly?", a detailed exposé of the mismanaged development of the Joint Strike Fighter, also known as the F-35 Lightning II. (September 2013)
- "Did Israel Avert a Hamas Massacre?" on how Israeli intelligence officials "may have narrowly averted their nation's own 9/11." (October 2014)
- "Documenting Evil: Inside Assad's Hospitals of Horror" about a military crime-scene photographer and archivist from Syria who amassed and defected with photographic and archival evidence of war crimes by the Assad regime. (June 2015)
- "Man of Her Dreams," recounting a relationship between world-renowned surgeon Paolo Macchiarini and NBC News producer Benita Alexander, which began on a professional level, became romantic, and later unearthed widespread fraudulent claims by the surgeon. (January 2016)
- "Frenemy of the State," about billionaire Peter Thiel's national security work for the Trump Administration. (November 2017)
- "Harveygeddon: Inside Harvey Weinstein’s Frantic Final Days" (February 2018), which was chosen as one of the "Best Vanity Fair Stories of 2018."
- "The Y Squad," chronicling the secret history of the world's most elite and elusive counter-terror force. (November 2018)
- "How a High-Tech Dragnet Nabbed the Alleged Financier of the Rwandan Genocide—After He'd Spent 26 Years on the Lam," examining how sophisticated intelligence gathering—and the COVID-19 lockdown pause—led to indicted war criminal Félicien Kabuga's capture in a dawn raid north of Paris. (May 2020)

=== P3 Media ===
In 2008, Ciralsky started his own production company, Physics Package Productions, which in 2008 became P3 Media. In addition to developing original concepts for film and television, the company adapts Ciralsky's original reporting and investigative work for the screen. In 2018, Ciralsky's P3 Media signed a first-look deal with ABC Studios for scripted content.

The company's first project was a primetime docu-series on NBC, titled The Wanted. The series was canceled because of bad ratings after two episodes domestically and six episodes internationally.

The show's premiere focused on Mullah Krekar, an Iraqi refugee living in Norway since 1991 who is also one of the founders and early leaders of the Ansar al-Islam organization, an Islamist group considered a terrorist organization by U.N. authorities as well as by the European Union. In 2003, the deportation of Krekar from Norway to Iraq was ordered, but the order was suspended due to concerns about the human rights situation in Iraq, particularly the risk that Krekar would be tortured or executed.

In November 2014, a motion picture adaptation of Ciralsky's "Tycoon, Contractor, Soldier, Spy" was announced, with Ciralsky, Nicolas Chartier, and Craig Flores as producers. Two months later, Stuart Beattie signed on to write the script.

Ciralsky's Vanity Fair piece, "Harveygeddon: Inside Harvey Weinstein’s Frantic Final Days," was optioned in March 2018 by Ryan Murphy and Fox 21 Television Studios.

In 2019, it was announced that Ciralsky's Vanity Fair piece, "Tycoon, Contractor, Soldier, Spy," will serve as the basis for the script of the forthcoming film Prince of War about the controversial life of Erik Prince, an ex-Navy SEAL and founder of the private military contracting firm Blackwater.

=== The Somali Project ===
Ciralsky co-directed and co-executive produced the feature-length documentary film, The Somali Project (originally titled The Project) along with his former 60 Minutes colleague Shawn Efran.

The documentary profiles the Puntland Maritime Police Force (PMPF) as it takes "the hijacking of the African waterways and the kidnapping of innocent citizens into their under-trained hands" and "face mutiny, death and a loss of corporate funding in their dangerous quest to free the Middle East shipping industry from terror."

The film's world premiere took place at the Tribeca Film Festival in 2013. It was also shown that year at film festivals in Vancouver, Bergen and Austin, where it was nominated for the award for Best Documentary Feature.

=== The Recruit ===
Ciralsky is an executive producer and inspiration for the Netflix series The Recruit (2022), which was created by Alexi Hawley and directed by fellow executive producer Doug Liman.

The Recruit follows a lawyer (Noah Centineo) who starts working for the CIA and immediately gets in over his head. According to Variety, the series "centers on Centineo's Owen Hendricks, a rookie attorney at the CIA who quickly realizes that if he wants to succeed in the Office of the General Counsel, he must learn how to navigate the complicated, overlapping worlds of law and espionage."

According to Vanity Fair: "Ahead of the premiere, Ciralsky set up a meeting at the real CIA headquarters in Virginia, where Centineo met real CIA attorneys and analysts and peppered them with questions about their jobs." For Ciralsky, the visit to the CIA felt like a "homecoming."

In January 2023 Netflix announced that it had renewed The Recruit for a second season.

== See also ==
- List of George Polk Award Winners
