= List of accolades received by Guardians of the Galaxy (film) =

Guardians of the Galaxy accolades
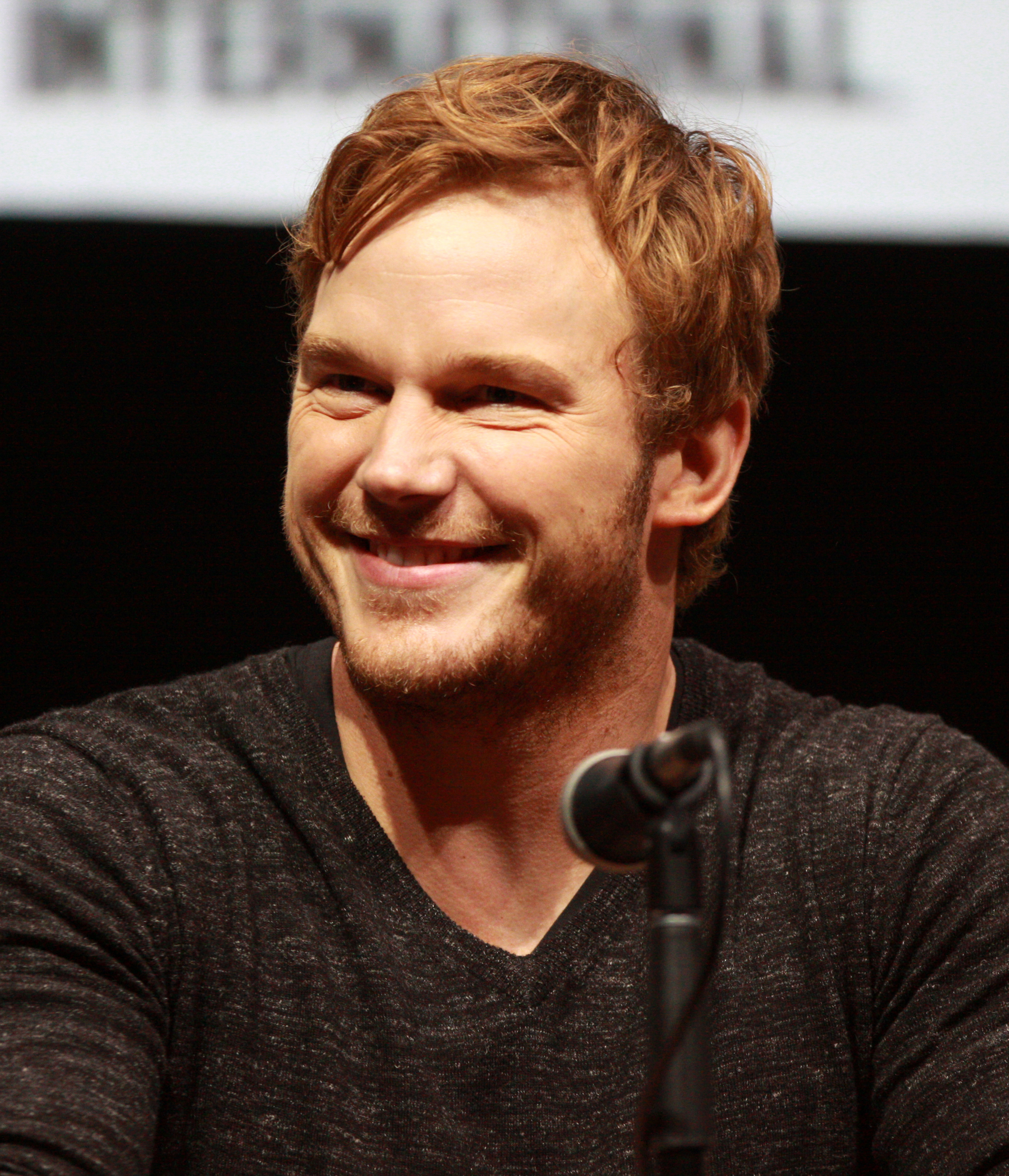
- Chris Pratt received multiple nominations for his role in the film.
Awards and nominations
Award	Wins	Nominations
3D Creative Arts Awards	1	2
Academy Awards	0	2
American Cinema Editors Awards	0	1
American Music Awards	0	1
Annie Awards	0	1
Art Directors Guild Awards	1	1
Artios Awards	0	1
Billboard Music Awards	0	2
Black Reel Awards	0	2
British Academy Film Awards	0	2
Cinema Audio Society Awards	0	1
Costume Designers Guild Awards	0	1
Critics' Choice Movie Awards	2	5
Detroit Film Critics Society Awards	1	2
Empire Awards	1	2
Florida Film Critics Circle Awards	0	1
Golden Reel Awards	0	2
Golden Trailer Awards	2	3
Grammy Awards	0	1
Guild of Music Supervisors Awards	1	1
Hollywood Film Awards	2	2
Hollywood Music in Media Awards	1	3
Hollywood Post Alliance Awards	0	1
Houston Film Critics Society Awards	0	2
Hugo Awards	1	1
ICG Publicists Awards	0	1
Make-Up Artists and Hair Stylists Guild Awards	2	3
MTV Movie Awards	0	8
New York Film Critics Online Awards	1	1
Nickelodeon Kids' Choice Awards	0	4
Nebula Awards	1	1
People's Choice Awards	0	3
Satellite Awards	0	1
Saturn Awards	4	9
St. Louis Film Critics Association Awards	2	5
Visual Effects Society Awards	0	2
Writers Guild of America Awards	0	1
Young Hollywood Awards	0	1

Totals (Note: Certain award groups do not simply award one winner. They acknowledge several different recipients, have runners-up, and have third place. Since this is a specific recognition and is different from losing an award, runner-up mentions are considered wins in this award tally. For simplification and to avoid errors, each award in this list has been presumed to have had a prior nomination.)
- Wins: 25
- Nominations: 83

Guardians of the Galaxy is a 2014 American superhero film based on the Marvel Comics superhero team of the same name. Produced by Marvel Studios and distributed by Walt Disney Studios Motion Pictures, it is the 10th film in the Marvel Cinematic Universe (MCU). Directed by James Gunn, who wrote the screenplay with Nicole Perlman, the film features an ensemble cast including Chris Pratt, Zoe Saldaña, Dave Bautista, Vin Diesel, and Bradley Cooper as the titular Guardians, along with Lee Pace, Michael Rooker, Karen Gillan, Djimon Hounsou, John C. Reilly, Glenn Close, and Benicio del Toro. In the film, Peter Quill and a group of extraterrestrial criminals go on the run after stealing a powerful artifact.

Guardians of the Galaxy premiered in Hollywood, Los Angeles, on July 21, 2014, and was theatrically released in the United States on August 1, as part of Phase Two of the MCU. Produced on a budget of $232.3 million, Guardians of the Galaxy grossed $773.3 million worldwide, finishing its theatrical run as the third-highest-grossing film of 2014. On the review aggregator website Rotten Tomatoes, the film holds an approval rating of 91% based on 337 reviews.

Guardians of the Galaxy garnered awards and nominations in various categories with particular recognition for its acting (mainly that of Pratt), make-up, and visual effects. It received two nominations at the 87th Academy Awards, including Best Visual Effects. The film garnered a nomination Outstanding Achievement for Character Animation in a Live Action Production at the 42nd Annie Awards. At the 68th British Academy Film Awards, Guardians of the Galaxy was nominated for Best Makeup and Hair and Best Special Visual Effects. It received five nominations at the 20th Critics' Choice Awards and won two awards. The film won four of nine nominations at the 41st Saturn Awards.

== Accolades ==
Accolades received by Guardians of the Galaxy (film)
Award	Date of ceremony	Category	Recipient(s)	Result	Ref.
3D Creative Arts Awards	January 28, 2015	Best Feature Film – Live Action	Guardians of the Galaxy	Won	
3D Creative Arts Awards	January 28, 2015	Best Stereoscopic Feature Film – Live Action	Guardians of the Galaxy	Nominated	
Academy Awards	February 22, 2015	Best Makeup and Hairstyling	Elizabeth Yianni-Georgiou and David White	Nominated	
Academy Awards	February 22, 2015	Best Visual Effects	Stephane Ceretti, Nicolas Aithadi, Jonathan Fawkner, and Paul Corbould	Nominated	
American Cinema Editors Awards	January 30, 2015	Best Edited Feature Film – Comedy or Musical	Fred Raskin, Hughes Winborne, and Craig Wood	Nominated	
American Music Awards	November 23, 2014	Top Soundtrack	Guardians of the Galaxy	Nominated	
Annie Awards	January 31, 2015	Outstanding Achievement for Character Animation in a Live Action Production	Kevin Spruce, Dale Newton, Sidney Kombo, Chris Mullins, and Brad Silby	Nominated	
Art Directors Guild Awards	January 31, 2015	Excellence in Production Design for a Fantasy Film	Charles Wood	Won	
Artios Awards	January 22, 2015	Outstanding Achievement in Casting – Big Budget Feature (Comedy)	Sarah Finn, Reg Poerscout-Edgerton, and Tamara Hunter	Nominated	
Billboard Music Awards	May 17, 2015	Top Soundtrack	Guardians of the Galaxy: Awesome Mix Vol. 1	Nominated	
Billboard Music Awards	May 22, 2016	Top Soundtrack	Guardians of the Galaxy: Awesome Mix Vol. 1	Nominated	
Black Reel Awards	February 19, 2015	Best Supporting Actress	Zoe Saldaña	Nominated	
Black Reel Awards	February 19, 2015	Best Voice Performance	Vin Diesel	Nominated	
British Academy Film Awards	February 8, 2015	Best Special Visual Effects	Stephane Ceretti, Paul Corbould, Jonathan Fawkner, and Nicolas Aithadi	Nominated	
British Academy Film Awards	February 8, 2015	Best Makeup and Hair	Elizabeth Yianni-Georgiou and David White	Nominated	
Cinema Audio Society Awards	February 14, 2015	Outstanding Achievement in Sound Mixing for a Motion Picture – Live Action	Simon Hayes, Lora Hirschberg, Christopher Boyes, Gustavo Borner, Doc Kane, and Chris Manning	Nominated	
Costume Designers Guild Awards	February 17, 2015	Excellence in Fantasy Film	Alexandra Byrne	Nominated	
Critics' Choice Movie Awards	January 15, 2015	Best Action Movie	Guardians of the Galaxy	Won	
Critics' Choice Movie Awards	January 15, 2015	Best Actor in an Action Movie	Chris Pratt	Nominated	
Critics' Choice Movie Awards	January 15, 2015	Best Actress in an Action Movie	Zoe Saldaña	Nominated	
Critics' Choice Movie Awards	January 15, 2015	Best Makeup	David White	Won	
Critics' Choice Movie Awards	January 15, 2015	Best Visual Effects	Stephane Ceretti	Nominated	
Detroit Film Critics Society Awards	December 15, 2014	Best Ensemble	Guardians of the Galaxy	Won	
Detroit Film Critics Society Awards	December 15, 2014	Breakthrough Performance	Chris Pratt	Nominated	
Empire Awards	March 29, 2015	Best Female Newcomer	Karen Gillan	Won (Note: Also for Oculus)	
Empire Awards	March 29, 2015	Best Sci-Fi/Fantasy	Guardians of the Galaxy	Nominated	
Florida Film Critics Circle Awards	December 19, 2014	Best Visual Effects	Guardians of the Galaxy	Nominated	
Golden Reel Awards	February 15, 2015	Outstanding Achievement in Sound Editing – Sound Effects and Foley for Feature Film	Christopher Boyes, Matthew Wood, David Acord, Kevin Sellers, David Chrastka, Kyrsten Mate, Luke Dunn Gielmuda, Dee Selby, Dennie Thorpe, and Jana Vance	Nominated	
Golden Reel Awards	February 15, 2015	Outstanding Achievement in Sound Editing – Feature Underscore	Steve Durkee, Darrell Hall, and Will Kaplan	Nominated	
Golden Trailer Awards	May 6, 2015	Best Fantasy Adventure	"Outlaws" (MOCEAN)	Nominated	
Golden Trailer Awards	May 6, 2015	Best Music	"Outlaws" (MOCEAN)	Won	
Golden Trailer Awards	May 6, 2015	Best Fantasy Adventure TV Spot	"World" (MOCEAN)	Won	
Grammy Awards	February 8, 2015	Best Compilation Soundtrack for Visual Media	Guardians of the Galaxy: Awesome Mix Vol. 1	Nominated	
Guild of Music Supervisors Awards	January 21, 2015	Best Music Supervision for Films Budgeted Over $25 Million	Dave Jordan	Won	
Hollywood Film Awards	November 14, 2014	Hollywood Blockbuster Award	Guardians of the Galaxy	Won	
Hollywood Film Awards	November 14, 2014	Make-Up and Hairstyling Award	Elizabeth Yianni-Georgiou and David White	Won	
Hollywood Music in Media Awards	November 4, 2014	Original Score – Sci-Fi/Fantasy Film	Tyler Bates	Nominated	
Hollywood Music in Media Awards	November 4, 2014	Best Music Supervision – Film	Dave Jordan	Nominated	
Hollywood Music in Media Awards	November 4, 2014	Soundtrack Album	Guardians of the Galaxy: Awesome Mix Vol. 1	Won	
Hollywood Post Alliance Awards	November 6, 2014	Outstanding Editing – Feature Film	Fred Raskin and Craig Wood	Nominated	
Houston Film Critics Society Awards	January 10, 2015	Best Picture	Guardians of the Galaxy	Nominated	
Houston Film Critics Society Awards	January 10, 2015	Best Poster	Guardians of the Galaxy	Nominated	
Hugo Awards	August 22, 2015	Best Dramatic Presentation, Long Form	James Gunn and Nicole Perlman	Won	
ICG Publicists Awards	February 20, 2015	Maxwell Weinberg Publicists Showmanship Motion Picture Award	Guardians of the Galaxy	Nominated	
Make-Up Artists and Hair Stylists Guild Awards	February 14, 2015	Best Contemporary Make-Up in a Feature-Length Motion Picture	Elizabeth Yianni-Georgiou	Won	
Make-Up Artists and Hair Stylists Guild Awards	February 14, 2015	Best Special Make-Up Effects in a Feature-Length Motion Picture	David White	Won	
Make-Up Artists and Hair Stylists Guild Awards	February 14, 2015	Best Contemporary Hair Styling in a Feature-Length Motion Picture	Elizabeth Yianni-Georgiou	Nominated	
MTV Movie Awards	April 12, 2015	Movie of the Year	Guardians of the Galaxy	Nominated	
MTV Movie Awards	April 12, 2015	Best Male Performance	Chris Pratt	Nominated	
MTV Movie Awards	April 12, 2015	Best On-Screen Duo	Bradley Cooper and Vin Diesel	Nominated	
MTV Movie Awards	April 12, 2015	Best Shirtless Performance	Chris Pratt	Nominated	
MTV Movie Awards	April 12, 2015	Best Musical Moment	Chris Pratt	Nominated	
MTV Movie Awards	April 12, 2015	Best Comedic Performance	Chris Pratt	Nominated	
MTV Movie Awards	April 12, 2015	Best On-Screen Transformation	Zoe Saldaña	Nominated	
MTV Movie Awards	April 12, 2015	Best Hero	Chris Pratt	Nominated	
New York Film Critics Online Awards	December 7, 2014	Top Films of the Year	Guardians of the Galaxy	Won	
Nickelodeon Kids' Choice Awards	March 28, 2015	Favorite Movie	Guardians of the Galaxy	Nominated	
Nickelodeon Kids' Choice Awards	March 28, 2015	Favorite Male Action Star	Chris Pratt	Nominated	
Nickelodeon Kids' Choice Awards	March 28, 2015	Favorite Female Action Star	Zoe Saldaña	Nominated	
Nickelodeon Kids' Choice Awards	March 28, 2015	Favorite Villain	Lee Pace	Nominated	
Nebula Awards	June 5, 2015	Ray Bradbury Nebula Award for Outstanding Dramatic Presentation	James Gunn and Nicole Perlman	Won	
People's Choice Awards	January 7, 2015	Favorite Movie	Guardians of the Galaxy	Nominated	
People's Choice Awards	January 7, 2015	Favorite Action Movie	Guardians of the Galaxy	Nominated	
People's Choice Awards	January 7, 2015	Favorite Action Movie Actress	Zoe Saldaña	Nominated	
Satellite Awards	February 15, 2015	Best Visual Effects	Stephane Ceretti	Nominated	
Saturn Awards	June 25, 2015	Best Comic-to-Film Motion Picture	Guardians of the Galaxy	Won	
Saturn Awards	June 25, 2015	Best Director	James Gunn	Won	
Saturn Awards	June 25, 2015	Best Writing	James Gunn and Nicole Perlman	Nominated	
Saturn Awards	June 25, 2015	Best Actor	Chris Pratt	Won	
Saturn Awards	June 25, 2015	Best Editing	Fred Raskin, Craig Wood, and Hughes Winborne	Nominated	
Saturn Awards	June 25, 2015	Best Production Design	Charles Wood	Nominated	
Saturn Awards	June 25, 2015	Best Costume	Alexandra Byrne	Nominated	
Saturn Awards	June 25, 2015	Best Make-up	David White and Elizabeth Yianni-Georgiou	Won	
Saturn Awards	June 25, 2015	Best Special Effects	Stephane Ceretti, Nicolas Aithadi, Jonathan Fawkner, and Paul Corbould	Nominated	
St. Louis Film Critics Association Awards	December 15, 2014	Best Comedy Film	Guardians of the Galaxy	Won	
St. Louis Film Critics Association Awards	December 15, 2014	Best Soundtrack	Guardians of the Galaxy	Won	
St. Louis Film Critics Association Awards	December 15, 2014	Best Adapted Screenplay	Guardians of the Galaxy	Nominated	
St. Louis Film Critics Association Awards	December 15, 2014	Best Visual Effects	Guardians of the Galaxy	Nominated	
St. Louis Film Critics Association Awards	December 15, 2014	Best Scene	Prison Break	Nominated	
Visual Effects Society Awards	February 4, 2015	Outstanding Visual Effects in a Photoreal Feature	Stephane Ceretti, Susan Pickett, Jonathan Fawkner, Nicolas Aithadi, and Paul Corbould	Nominated	
Visual Effects Society Awards	February 4, 2015	Outstanding Animated Character in a Photoreal Feature	Kevin Spruce, Rachel Williams, Laurie Brugger, and Mark Wilson for "Rocket"	Nominated	
Writers Guild of America Awards	February 14, 2015	Best Adapted Screenplay	James Gunn and Nicole Perlman	Nominated	
Young Hollywood Awards	July 28, 2014	Super Superhero	Chris Pratt	Nominated	
