= Off the Grid: Million Dollar Manhunt =

- Starring: Kevin Reeve
- Country of origin: United States

Original release
- Network: The History Channel
- Release: 2011

Off the Grid: Million Dollar Manhunt is a game show that airs on The History Channel. Contestants attempt to evade Kevin Reeve, an expert in surveillance, fugitive tracking, and classified government technologies. If they can succeed in performing simple tasks, for one day, and avoid detection, they win $1 million.
