= 2011 Teen Choice Awards =

American awards ceremony held in California

- Date: August 7, 2011
- Location: Gibson Amphitheatre, Universal City, California
- Hosted by: Kaley Cuoco

Television/radio coverage
- Network: Fox

The 2011 Teen Choice Awards ceremony, hosted by Kaley Cuoco, aired live on August 7, 2011, at the Gibson Amphitheatre, Universal City, California. This was the first time that the ceremonies were aired live since the 2007 show.

== Ratings ==
The show was viewed by an estimated 3.17 million Americans with a 1.1 out of 3 rating/share.

== Performers ==
- will.i.am (DJ Host) – "Party Like An Animal"
- Selena Gomez & the Scene – "Love You Like a Love Song"
- Jason Derulo – "Don't Wanna Go Home"
- OneRepublic – "Good Life"

== Presenters ==
- Allstar Weekend
- Ashley Greene
- Avril Lavigne
- Blake Lively
- Cameron Diaz
- Cat Deeley
- Charice
- Christopher Mintz-Plasse
- Daniel Radcliffe
- Demi Lovato
- Ed Helms
- Emma Stone
- Ian Somerhalder
- Jason Bateman
- Joe Jonas
- Joel McHale
- John Cena
- Justin Bieber
- Kat Graham
- Katie Leclerc
- Kendall Jenner
- Kellan Lutz
- Kylie Jenner
- Khloé Kardashian
- Kim Kardashian
- Kourtney Kardashian
- Lucy Hale
- Nikki Reed
- Nina Dobrev
- Paul Wesley
- Rachel Bilson
- Rebecca Black
- Rupert Grint
- Shane West
- Shaun White
- Taylor Lautner
- Taylor Swift
- The Miz
- Tom Felton
- Tyler Posey
- Tyra Banks
- Vanessa Marano
- Zooey Deschanel

== Winners and nominees ==
Winners are listed first and highlighted in bold text.

=== Movies ===
Choice Movie: Action	Choice Movie Actor: Action
**Fast Five**; Faster; Scott Pilgrim vs. the World; The Tourist; Unstoppable	**Johnny Depp – The Tourist**; Michael Cera – Scott Pilgrim vs. the World; Vin Diesel – Fast Five; Dwayne Johnson – Fast Five; Paul Walker – Fast Five
Choice Movie Actress: Action	Choice Movie: Sci-Fi/Fantasy
**Angelina Jolie – The Tourist**; Jordana Brewster – Fast Five; Rosario Dawson – Unstoppable; Carla Gugino – Faster; Mary Elizabeth Winstead – Scott Pilgrim vs. the World	**Harry Potter and the Deathly Hallows – Part 1**; Pirates of the Caribbean: On Stranger Tides; Super 8; The Twilight Saga: Eclipse; X-Men: First Class
Choice Movie Actor: Sci-Fi/Fantasy	Choice Movie Actress: Sci-Fi/Fantasy
**Taylor Lautner – The Twilight Saga: Eclipse**; Johnny Depp – Pirates of the Caribbean: On Stranger Tides; Robert Pattinson – The Twilight Saga: Eclipse; Daniel Radcliffe – Harry Potter and the Deathly Hallows – Part 1; Ryan Reynolds – Green Lantern	**Emma Watson – Harry Potter and the Deathly Hallows – Part 1**; Penélope Cruz – Pirates of the Caribbean: On Stranger Tides; Elle Fanning – Super 8; Blake Lively – Green Lantern; Kristen Stewart – The Twilight Saga: Eclipse
Choice Movie: Drama	Choice Movie Actor: Drama
**Black Swan**; Country Strong; The Roommate; Soul Surfer; Water for Elephants	**Robert Pattinson – Water for Elephants**; Bradley Cooper – Limitless; Jesse Eisenberg – The Social Network; Garrett Hedlund – Country Strong; Shia LaBeouf – Wall Street: Money Never Sleeps
Choice Movie Actress: Drama	Choice Movie: Romantic Comedy
**Natalie Portman – Black Swan**; Minka Kelly – The Roommate; Leighton Meester – Country Strong; AnnaSophia Robb – Soul Surfer; Reese Witherspoon – Water for Elephants	**Easy A**; Just Go with It; Life as We Know It; No Strings Attached; Something Borrowed
Choice Movie Actor: Romantic Comedy	Choice Movie Actress: Romantic Comedy
**Ashton Kutcher – No Strings Attached**; Penn Badgley – Easy A; Josh Duhamel – Life as We Know It; John Krasinski – Something Borrowed; Adam Sandler – Just Go with It	**Emma Stone – Easy A**; Jennifer Aniston – Just Go with It; Ginnifer Goodwin – Something Borrowed; Natalie Portman – No Strings Attached; Emma Roberts – The Art of Getting By
Choice Movie: Comedy	Choice Movie Actor: Comedy
**Bad Teacher**; Bridesmaids; Due Date; Little Fockers; The Other Guys	**Justin Timberlake – Bad Teacher**; Russell Brand – Arthur; Will Ferrell – The Other Guys; Zach Galifianakis – Due Date & The Hangover Part II; Ed Helms – The Hangover Part II
Choice Movie Actress: Comedy	Choice Movie: Horror
**Cameron Diaz – Bad Teacher**; Anna Faris – Take Me Home Tonight; Eva Mendes – The Other Guys; Maya Rudolph – Bridesmaids; Kristen Wiig – Bridesmaids	**Paranormal Activity 2**; Let Me In; Piranha 3D; Saw 3D; Scream 4
Choice Movie: Voice	Choice Movie: Villain
**Johnny Depp (Rango, Rango)**; Jack Black (Po, Kung Fu Panda 2); Anne Hathaway (Jewel, Rio); Zachary Levi (Flynn Rider, Tangled); Justin Timberlake (Boo-Boo Bear, Yogi Bear)	**Tom Felton – Harry Potter and the Deathly Hallows – Part 1**; Kevin Bacon – X-Men: First Class; Bryce Dallas Howard – The Twilight Saga: Eclipse; Ian McShane – Pirates of the Caribbean: On Stranger Tides; Leighton Meester – The Roommate
Choice Movie Male Scene Stealer	Choice Movie Female Scene Stealer
**Kellan Lutz – The Twilight Saga: Eclipse**; Andrew Garfield – The Social Network; Riley Griffiths – Super 8; Ken Jeong – The Hangover Part II; Justin Timberlake – The Social Network	**Ashley Greene – The Twilight Saga: Eclipse**; Crystal the Monkey – The Hangover Part II; Mila Kunis – Black Swan; Melissa McCarthy – Bridesmaids; Aly Michalka – Easy A & The Roommate
Choice Movie: Breakout Actor	Choice Movie: Breakout Actress
**Alex Pettyfer – I Am Number Four & Beastly**; Joel Courtney – Super 8; Armie Hammer – The Social Network; Chris Hemsworth – Thor; Xavier Samuel – The Twilight Saga: Eclipse	**Brooklyn Decker – Just Go with It**; Zoë Kravitz – X-Men: First Class; Jennifer Lawrence – X-Men: First Class; Hailee Steinfeld – True Grit; Olivia Wilde – Tron: Legacy
Choice Movie: Chemistry	Choice Movie: Liplock
**Adam Sandler & Jennifer Aniston – Just Go with It**; Gabriel Basso, Joel Courtney, Elle Fanning, Riley Griffiths, Ryan Lee, & Zach Mills – Super 8; Bradley Cooper, Ed Helms, & Zach Galifianakis – The Hangover Part II; Will Ferrell & Mark Wahlberg – The Other Guys; Lucas Till, Jennifer Lawrence, Nicholas Hoult, Zoë Kravitz, Caleb Landry Jones, & Edi Gathegi – X-Men: First Class	**Daniel Radcliffe & Emma Watson – Harry Potter and the Deathly Hallows – Part 1**; Alex Pettyfer & Vanessa Hudgens – Beastly; Natalie Portman & Mila Kunis – Black Swan; Kristen Stewart & Taylor Lautner – The Twilight Saga: Eclipse; Kristen Stewart & Robert Pattinson – The Twilight Saga: Eclipse
Choice Movie: Hissy Fit	Choice Movie: Summer
**Ed Helms – The Hangover Part II**; Robert Downey Jr. – Due Date; Bruce Greenwood – Super 8; Mark Wahlberg – The Other Guys; Kristen Wiig – Bridesmaids	**Harry Potter and the Deathly Hallows – Part 2**; Captain America: The First Avenger; Horrible Bosses; Monte Carlo; Transformers: Dark of the Moon
Choice Summer Movie Star: Male	Choice Summer Movie Star: Female
**Daniel Radcliffe – Harry Potter and the Deathly Hallows – Part 2**; Chris Evans – Captain America: The First Avenger; Shia LaBeouf – Transformers: Dark of the Moon; Cory Monteith – Monte Carlo; Justin Timberlake – Friends with Benefits	**Emma Watson – Harry Potter and the Deathly Hallows – Part 2**; Rosario Dawson – Zookeeper; Selena Gomez – Monte Carlo; Rosie Huntington-Whiteley – Transformers: Dark of the Moon; Mila Kunis – Friends with Benefits

=== Television ===
Choice TV Show: Drama	Choice TV Actor: Drama
**Gossip Girl**; Bones; House; Make It or Break It; The Secret Life of the American Teenager	**Chace Crawford – Gossip Girl**; Penn Badgley – Gossip Girl; David Boreanaz – Bones; Daren Kagasoff – The Secret Life of the American Teenager; Hugh Laurie – House
Choice TV Actress: Drama	Choice TV Show: Sci-Fi/Fantasy
**Blake Lively – Gossip Girl**; Emily Deschanel – Bones; Josie Loren – Make It or Break It; Olivia Wilde – House; Shailene Woodley – The Secret Life of the American Teenager	**The Vampire Diaries**; Fringe; Smallville; Supernatural; Teen Wolf
Choice TV Actor: Sci-Fi/Fantasy	Choice TV Actress: Sci-Fi/Fantasy
**Ian Somerhalder – The Vampire Diaries**; Joshua Jackson – Fringe; Jared Padalecki – Supernatural; Tom Welling – Smallville; Paul Wesley – The Vampire Diaries	**Nina Dobrev – The Vampire Diaries**; Erica Durance – Smallville; Anna Paquin – True Blood; Crystal Reed – Teen Wolf; Anna Torv – Fringe
Choice TV Show: Action	Choice TV Actor: Action
**NCIS: Los Angeles**; Burn Notice; Chuck; Hawaii Five-O; Nikita	**Shane West – Nikita**; Jeffrey Donovan – Burn Notice; Daniel Dae Kim – Hawaii Five-O; Zachary Levi – Chuck; LL Cool J – NCIS: Los Angeles
Choice TV Actress: Action	Choice TV Show: Comedy
**Linda Hunt – NCIS: Los Angeles**; Lyndsy Fonseca – Nikita; Grace Park – Hawaii Five-O; Maggie Q – Nikita; Yvonne Strahovski – Chuck	**Glee**; The Big Bang Theory; iCarly; Modern Family; Wizards of Waverly Place
Choice TV Actor: Comedy	Choice TV Actress: Comedy
**Cory Monteith – Glee**; Ty Burrell – Modern Family; Steve Carell – The Office; John Krasinski – The Office; Jim Parsons – The Big Bang Theory	**Selena Gomez – Wizards of Waverly Place**; Miranda Cosgrove – iCarly; Kaley Cuoco – The Big Bang Theory; Miley Cyrus – Hannah Montana; Demi Lovato – Sonny with a Chance
Choice TV Animated Show	Choice TV Reality Show
**The Simpsons**; American Dad!; Bob's Burgers; The Cleveland Show; Family Guy	**Jersey Shore**; Khloé & Lamar; Kourtney and Kim Take New York; The Real World: Las Vegas; Secret Millionaire
Choice TV Reality Competition Show	Choice TV: Personality
**American Idol**; America's Best Dance Crew; So You Think You Can Dance; The Voice; Wipeout	**Jennifer Lopez – American Idol**; Christina Aguilera – The Voice; Tyra Banks – America’s Next Top Model; Adam Levine – The Voice; Ryan Seacrest – American Idol
Choice TV: Villain	Choice TV Male Scene Stealer
**Justin Bieber – CSI: Crime Scene Investigation**; Jane Lynch – Glee; Seth MacFarlane (Stewie Griffin, Family Guy); Joseph Morgan – The Vampire Diaries; Ed Westwick – Gossip Girl	**Michael Trevino – The Vampire Diaries**; Chris Colfer – Glee; Rico Rodriguez II – Modern Family; Mark Salling – Glee; Eric Stonestreet – Modern Family
Choice TV Female Scene Stealer	Choice TV Breakout Show
**Kat Graham – The Vampire Diaries**; Dianna Agron – Glee; Jennette McCurdy – iCarly; Amber Riley – Glee; Sofía Vergara – Modern Family	**The Voice**; The Hard Times of RJ Berger; The Nine Lives of Chloe King; Raising Hope; The Walking Dead
Choice TV Breakout Star	Choice TV Male Reality/Variety Star
**Darren Criss – Glee**; Sean Berdy – Switched at Birth; Katie Leclerc – Switched at Birth; Tyler Posey – Teen Wolf; Skyler Samuels – The Nine Lives of Chloe King	**Paul "Pauly D" DelVocchio – Jersey Shore**; Rob Dyrdek – Rob Dyrdek's Fantasy Factory; Lamar Odom – Khloé & Lamar; Michael "The Situation" Sorrentino – Jersey Shore; Brad Womack – The Bachelor
Choice TV Female Reality/Variety Star	Choice TV Summer Show
**The Kardashians – Keeping Up with the Kardashians**; Laurieann Gibson – The Dance Scene; Chelsea Handler – After Lately; Audrina Patridge – Audrina; Nicole "Snooki" Polizzi – Jersey Shore	**Pretty Little Liars**; Keeping Up with the Kardashians; So You Think You Can Dance; Switched at Birth; Teen Wolf
Choice Summer TV Star: Male	Choice Summer TV Star: Female
**Ian Harding – Pretty Little Liars**; Keegan Allen – Pretty Little Liars; Lucas Grabeel – Switched at Birth; Tyler Posey – Teen Wolf; Noah Wyle – Falling Skies	**Lucy Hale – Pretty Little Liars**; Troian Bellisario – Pretty Little Liars; Vanessa Marano – Switched at Birth; Raven-Symoné – State of Georgia; Crystal Reed – Teen Wolf

=== Music ===
Choice Music: Male Artist	Choice Music: Female Artist
**Justin Bieber**; Jason Derulo; CeeLo Green; Enrique Iglesias; Bruno Mars	**Taylor Swift**; Adele; Lady Gaga; Katy Perry; Rihanna
Choice Music: Group	Choice Music: R&B/Hip-Hop Artist
**Selena Gomez & the Scene**; The Black Eyed Peas; Far East Movement; Glee Cast; The Script	**Eminem**; Lupe Fiasco; Nicki Minaj; Pitbull; Kanye West
Choice Music: Rock Group	Choice Music: Country Artist – Male
**Paramore**; Foo Fighters; Linkin Park; OneRepublic; Thirty Seconds to Mars	**Keith Urban**; Jason Aldean; Luke Bryan; Brad Paisley; Blake Shelton
Choice Music: Country Artist – Female	Choice Music: Country Group
**Taylor Swift**; Miranda Lambert; Jennette McCurdy; Kellie Pickler; Carrie Underwood	**Lady Antebellum**; The Band Perry; Little Big Town; Rascal Flatts; Steel Magnolia
Choice Music: Single	Choice Music: Country Track
**"Who Says" – Selena Gomez & the Scene**; "Born This Way" – Lady Gaga; "Firework" – Katy Perry; "Give Me Everything" – Pitbull ft. Afrojack, Ne-Yo, & Nayer; "The Time (Dirty Bit)" – The Black Eyed Peas	**"Mean" – Taylor Swift**; "Country Girl (Shake It for Me)" – Luke Bryan; "Honey Bee" – Blake Shelton; "If I Die Young" – The Band Perry; "Just a Kiss" – Lady Antebellum
Choice Music: Rock Track	Choice Music: R&B/Hip-Hop Track
**"Monster" – Paramore**; "Good Life" – OneRepublic; "Rope" – Foo Fighters; "Sing" – My Chemical Romance; "Waiting for the End" – Linkin Park	**"Run the World (Girls)" – Beyoncé**; "All of the Lights" – Kanye West ft. Rihanna; "Don't Wanna Go Home" – Jason Derulo; "I Need a Doctor" – Dr. Dre ft. Eminem & Skylar Grey; "Just Can't Get Enough" – The Black Eyed Peas
Choice Music: Love Song	Choice Music: Break-Up Song
**"Love You Like a Love Song" – Selena Gomez & the Scene**; "Come Down with Love" – Allstar Weekend; "Just the Way You Are" – Bruno Mars; "Mine" – Taylor Swift; "Teenage Dream" – Katy Perry	**"Back to December" – Taylor Swift**; "Forget You" – CeeLo Green; "Grenade" – Bruno Mars; "Rolling in the Deep" – Adele; "See No More" – Joe Jonas
Choice Music: Breakout Artist	Choice Music: Summer Song
**Bruno Mars**; Adele; Javier Colon; Scotty McCreery; Wiz Khalifa	**"Skyscraper" – Demi Lovato**; "Last Friday Night" – Katy Perry; "The Lazy Song" – Bruno Mars; "Party Rock Anthem" – LMFAO ft. Lauren Bennett & GoonRock; "Super Bass" – Nicki Minaj
Choice Summer Music Star: Male	Choice Summer Music Star: Female
**Bruno Mars**; Jason Derulo; David Guetta; Lil Wayne; Pitbull	**Katy Perry**; Beyoncé; Selena Gomez; Demi Lovato; Britney Spears

=== Miscellaneous ===
Choice Hottie: Male	Choice Hottie: Female
**Justin Bieber**; Joe Jonas; Taylor Lautner; Robert Pattinson; Ian Somerhalder	**Selena Gomez**; Nina Dobrev; Kim Kardashian; Minka Kelly; Mila Kunis
Choice Comedian	Choice Athlete: Male
**Ellen DeGeneres**; Jimmy Fallon; George Lopez; Andy Samberg; Daniel Tosh	**Shaun White**; Jon Jones; Dirk Nowitzki; Manny Pacquiao; Alex Rodriguez
Choice Athlete: Female	Choice Red Carpet Fashion Icon: Male
**Shawn Johnson**; Danica Patrick; Maria Sharapova; Lindsey Vonn; Serena Williams	**Zac Efron**; Justin Bieber; Chris Colfer; Jaden Smith; Justin Timberlake
Choice Red Carpet Fashion Icon: Female	Choice Vampire
**Taylor Swift**; Miley Cyrus; Vanessa Hudgens; Lady Gaga; Jennifer Lopez	**Robert Pattinson – The Twilight Saga as Edward Cullen**; Nina Dobrev – The Vampire Diaries as Elena Gilbert; Nikki Reed – The Twilight Saga as Rosalie Hale; Alexander Skarsgård – True Blood as Eric Northman; Ian Somerhalder – The Vampire Diaries as Damon Salvatore; Paul Wesley – The Vampire Diaries as Stefan Salvatore
Choice Web Star	Choice Twit
**Rebecca Black**; Keenan Cahill; Shane Dawson; Elle and Blair Fowler; Sgt. Scott Moore	**Justin Bieber**; Ellen DeGeneres; Ashton Kutcher; Demi Lovato; Homer Simpson
