= Star Trek Into Darkness =

2013 film by J. J. Abrams

- Theatrical release poster
- Directed by: J. J. Abrams
- Written by: Roberto Orci; Alex Kurtzman; Damon Lindelof
- Based on: Star Trek by Gene Roddenberry
- Produced by: J. J. Abrams; Bryan Burk; David Ellison; Dana Goldberg; Don Granger; Damon Lindelof; Alex Kurtzman; Roberto Orci
- Starring: John Cho; Benedict Cumberbatch; Alice Eve; Bruce Greenwood; Simon Pegg; Chris Pine; Zachary Quinto; Zoe Saldaña; Karl Urban; Peter Weller; Anton Yelchin
- Cinematography: Dan Mindel
- Edited by: Mary Jo Markey; Maryann Brandon
- Music by: Michael Giacchino
- Production companies: Paramount Pictures; Skydance Productions; Bad Robot; K/O Paper Products
- Distributed by: Paramount Pictures
- Release dates: April 23, 2013 (Sydney); May 15, 2013 (United States)
- Running time: 132 minutes
- Country: United States
- Language: English
- Budget: $185–190 million
- Box office: $467 million

Star Trek Into Darkness is a 2013 American science fiction action film directed by J. J. Abrams, and written by Roberto Orci, Alex Kurtzman, and Damon Lindelof. It is the 12th installment in the Star Trek franchise and the sequel to the 2009 film Star Trek, as the second in a rebooted film series. It features Chris Pine reprising his role as Captain James T. Kirk, with Zachary Quinto, Simon Pegg, Karl Urban, Zoe Saldaña, John Cho, Anton Yelchin, Bruce Greenwood, and Leonard Nimoy reprising their roles from the previous film. Benedict Cumberbatch, Alice Eve, and Peter Weller are also in the film's principal cast. It was Nimoy's last film appearance before his death in 2015. Set in the 23rd century, the film follows Kirk and the crew of USS Enterprise as they are sent to the Klingon homeworld seeking the terrorist John Harrison.

After the release of Star Trek, Abrams, Burk, Lindelof, Kurtzman, and Orci agreed to produce its sequel. Filming began in January 2012. Into Darkness's visual effects were created by Lucasfilm's Industrial Light & Magic. The film was converted to 3D during its post-production stage.

It premiered at Event Cinemas in Sydney, Australia, on April 23, 2013, and was released in IMAX theaters in the U.S. on May 15, 2013, with release in standard-format theaters the next day. Into Darkness was a financial success and received positive reviews from critics. Its gross earnings of over $467 million worldwide have made it the highest-grossing entry in the Star Trek franchise. It was nominated for Best Visual Effects at the 86th Academy Awards. It was followed by Star Trek Beyond in 2016.

== Plot ==
In 2259, Captain James T. Kirk is removed from command of the starship USS Enterprise for violating the Prime Directive by revealing the ship to the primitive inhabitants of the planet Nibiru to save them, and Spock, from a cataclysmic volcanic eruption. Admiral Christopher Pike is reinstated as commanding officer, and Kirk is demoted to first officer. Spock is transferred to another ship. Shortly after, Starfleet officer Thomas Harewood, sent by Commander John Harrison, bombs a Section 31 installation in London. During an emergency meeting on the situation, Harrison uses a ship to ambush and kill Pike and other senior officers, before transporting to Kronos, the homeworld of the hostile Klingons.

Admiral Alexander Marcus reinstates Kirk and Spock to the Enterprise with orders to kill Harrison using a new long-range stealth torpedo. Chief Engineer Montgomery Scott objects to allowing untested torpedoes on board without knowing their specifications; when he is overruled, he resigns. Kirk assigns Pavel Chekov to replace Scotty. En route to Kronos, Enterprise's warp capabilities become disabled. Kirk decides to arrest Harrison instead of killing him and leads a team with Spock and Uhura to the planet, where Klingon patrols ambush them. Harrison appears and kills the Klingons single-handedly but surrenders when he learns there are precisely 72 torpedoes on board Enterprise.

Dr. Leonard McCoy and Marcus's daughter, Dr. Carol Marcus, open a torpedo at Harrison's urging, revealing the torpedoes contain cryonically frozen humans. Harrison is taken to Enterprise's brig, where he reveals his true identity as Khan Noonien Singh, a genetically engineered superhuman who was awoken by Admiral Marcus from centuries of sleep and forced to develop advanced weapons after Marcus threatened to kill his 72-member crew, whom Khan smuggled into the torpedoes in a previous attempt to liberate them. Khan reveals that Marcus sabotaged Enterprise's warp drive, intending for the Klingons to destroy the ship after it fired on Kronos, sparking a war with the Klingon Empire. Khan also gives Kirk a set of coordinates, which Kirk asks Scott to investigate. Scott discovers the coordinates lead to a covert Starfleet facility.

Enterprise is intercepted by a much larger Starfleet warship, USS Vengeance, commanded by Admiral Marcus. Marcus demands that Kirk deliver Khan, but Enterprise flees to Earth to expose him. After Vengeance disables Enterprise near the Moon, Carol reveals her presence aboard Enterprise to stop the attack. Marcus forcibly transports Carol to Vengeance before ordering Enterprise's destruction. Vengeance loses power after being sabotaged by Scott, who infiltrated the ship. With transporters down, Kirk and Khan, with the latter's knowledge of the warship's design, space-jump to Vengeance. Meanwhile, Spock contacts his future self (Note: Ambassador Spock, played by Leonard Nimoy, is the version of Spock from The Original Series, who was transported from the future during the events of Star Trek (2009).) on New Vulcan, who tells him of his own encounter with Khan and warns that he cannot be trusted. After fighting their way to the bridge, Khan overpowers Kirk, Scott, and Carol, kills Marcus, and takes control of Vengeance.

Khan demands Spock return his frozen crew in exchange for the Enterprise officers, to which Spock complies. When Khan starts shooting at Enterprise, Spock detonates the warheads, crippling the ship but having had McCoy surreptitiously remove Khan's frozen crew from the torpedoes beforehand. Both starships are caught in Earth's gravity and plummet toward the surface. Kirk enters Enterprise's radioactive reactor chamber to realign the warp core, sacrificing himself to save the ship.

Khan crashes Vengeance into San Francisco in an attempt to destroy Starfleet headquarters, while McCoy discovers that Khan's blood has regenerative properties that may save Kirk. A vengeful Spock pursues Khan through the city, and the two engage in hand-to-hand combat. As Spock prepares to kill Khan, Uhura beams down and stops him, revealing that he is their only chance to save Kirk. Khan's blood revives Kirk, and Khan is sealed in his cryogenic pod and stored with his compatriots. One year later, Kirk speaks at Enterprise's re-dedication ceremony. The Enterprise crew embarks on a five-year-long exploratory mission.

== Cast ==
- Chris Pine as Captain James T. Kirk, captain of the starship Enterprise.
- Zachary Quinto as Commander Spock, first officer and science officer. Leonard Nimoy has a cameo appearance as Spock Prime.
- Karl Urban as Dr. Leonard "Bones" McCoy, chief medical officer.
- Zoe Saldaña as Lieutenant Nyota Uhura, communications officer.
- Simon Pegg as Lieutenant Commander Montgomery "Scotty" Scott, chief engineer.
- John Cho as Lieutenant Hikaru Sulu, helmsman.
- Benedict Cumberbatch as Khan Noonien Singh, a genetically engineered superhuman given the false identity of Commander John Harrison
- Anton Yelchin as Ensign Pavel Chekov, navigator and Scott's temporary replacement as chief engineer.
- Bruce Greenwood as Admiral Christopher Pike, Kirk's predecessor as captain of the Enterprise and mentor.
- Peter Weller as Starfleet Fleet Admiral Alexander Marcus, Carol's father.
- Alice Eve as Dr. Carol Marcus, a science officer who uses the pseudonym Carol Wallace to board the Enterprise.
- Noel Clarke as Thomas Harewood, a Starfleet officer, working within Section 31 who is bribed by Khan into blowing up the facility.
- Nazneen Contractor as Rima Harewood, Thomas' wife

Additional members of the Enterprise crew include Amanda Foreman as Ensign Brackett, Jay Scully as Lieutenant Chapin, Jonathan Dixon as Ensign Froman, Aisha Hinds as Navigation Officer Darwin, and Joseph Gatt as Science Officer 0718. Deep Roy and Jason Matthew Smith reprise their roles as Keenser and Hendorff from the first film. Anjini Taneja Azhar, Nolan North, and Sean Blakemore also appear in the film, with Azhar as Lucille Harewood, the terminally ill daughter of Thomas Harewood; North portraying a Vengeance helmsman; and Blakemore playing a Klingon. Heather Langenkamp portrays Moto, a character she describes as a small role, and Ser'Darius Blain appears as a redshirt. Director J. J. Abrams' son Henry and daughter Gracie appear as extras during the sequence where the Vengeance crashes into San Francisco.

== Production ==
=== Development ===
In June 2008, it was reported that Paramount Pictures was interested in signing J. J. Abrams, Bryan Burk, Damon Lindelof, Alex Kurtzman and Roberto Orci, the producers of the 2009 Star Trek film, for a sequel. In March 2009, it was reported that these five producers had agreed to produce the film, with a script again written by Orci and Kurtzman (with the addition of Lindelof). A preliminary script was said to be completed by Christmas 2009 for a 2011 release. Kurtzman and Orci began writing the script in June 2009, originally intending to split the film into two parts. Leonard Nimoy, the original Spock who plays an older version of the character in the 2009 film, said he would not appear in the film. Abrams was reportedly considering William Shatner for one of the sequel's characters.

By 2010, a release date of June 29, 2012, was set, with Lindelof announcing he had begun working on the script with Kurtzman and Orci. Pre-production was set for January 2011, although Burk said actual filming would probably begin during the spring or summer. Actor Zachary Quinto later said that these reports were untrue. Lindelof compared the sequel to The Dark Knight.

Abrams, Kurtzman, and Orci said that selecting a villain was difficult; according to Abrams, "the universe Roddenberry created is so vast that it's hard to say one particular thing stands out". They also discussed the possibility of Khan Noonien Singh and Klingons. Kurtzman and Lindelof said they had "broken" the story (created an outline); instead of a sequel, it will be a stand-alone film. Abrams admitted in December 2010 that, despite his best efforts, there was still no script.

In January 2011, Abrams said he had not decided whether or not he would direct, since he had not yet seen a script. Paramount Pictures then approached him, asking that the sequel be in 3D. Abrams said that the film would not be shot in 3D, but filmed in 2D and converted during post-production. He was also interested in filming in IMAX: "IMAX is my favorite format; I'm a huge fan." In February, Orci tweeted that he (with Lindelof and Kurtzman) planned to deliver the script in March 2011. Although the script was not finished on schedule, Paramount began financing pre-production; similar circumstances on the next Jack Ryan film meant that Chris Pine would film the Star Trek sequel first. By April, Orci said at WonderCon that the script's first draft had been completed. Abrams told MTV that when he finished his film, Super 8, he would turn his full attention to the Trek sequel.

Although a script was completed, uncertainty regarding the extent of Abrams's involvement led to the film's being pushed back six months from its scheduled June 2012 release. Other factors which precluded the release, ending up pushing it further back were the high budget and overall difficulty of finding actors to fit the roles. In June, Abrams confirmed that his next project would be the sequel, noting that he would rather the film be good than ready by its scheduled release date. Simon Pegg, who played Scotty, said in an interview that he thought filming would begin during the latter part of the year. Abrams stated he would prioritize the film's story and characters over an early release date. In September, Abrams agreed to direct the film, with the cast from the previous film reprising their respective roles for a winter 2012 or summer 2013 release. In October, Orci said that location scouting was underway, and a comic book series (of which Orci would be creative director) would "foreshadow" the film. Into Darkness was given a revised release date of 2013, and Michael Giacchino confirmed that he would return to write the score.

Lindelof said that Khan was considered a character they needed to use at some point, given that "he has such an intense gravity in the Trek universe, we likely would have expended more energy NOT putting him in this movie than the other way around." References to Star Trek II: The Wrath of Khan were eventually added to the script, but Lindelof, Orci, and Kurtzman "were ever wary of the line between 'reimagined homage' and 'direct ripoff'." Orci and Kurtzman said they wanted a film which would work on its own and as a sequel, not using ideas from previous Star Trek works simply "because you think people are going to love it". Orci noted that when trying to create the "gigantic imagery" required by a summer blockbuster, Kurtzman suggested a scene where Enterprise rose from the ocean. With that as a starting point they (and Lindelof) came up with the cold open in Nibiru, which blended action and comedy and was isolated from the main story in an homage to Raiders of the Lost Ark.

Actor Benicio del Toro had reportedly been sought as the villain, and had met with Abrams to discuss the role; however, he later bowed out. In 2011, Alice Eve and Peter Weller agreed to their roles. actor Noel Clarke agreed to an unknown role, reported to be "a family man with a wife and young daughter". Demián Bichir auditioned for the villain role, but as reported by Variety on January 4, 2012, Benedict Cumberbatch was cast.

=== Filming ===
Into Darkness began principal photography on January 12, 2012, with a scheduled release date of May 16, 2013. Cinematographer Dan Mindel shot the film using a combination of anamorphic 35mm film and 15 perforation IMAX cameras. About 30 minutes of the film is shot in the IMAX format, while some other scenes were also shot on 8 perforation 65mm. Into Darkness was released in 3D. On February 24, 2012, images from the set surfaced of Benedict Cumberbatch's character in a fight with Spock. Edgar Wright directed one shot in the film. Production ended in May 2012.

Filming was done on location in Los Angeles, California, and around the area at the Lawrence Livermore National Laboratory in Livermore. Additional locations included Paramount Studios in Hollywood, Sony Pictures Studios in Culver City, the Crystal Cathedral in Garden Grove, and the Greystone Mansion in Beverly Hills. Some shots were made in Iceland.

Marc Okrand, the developer of the Klingon language, provided the Klingon dialogues with on-set coaching from constructed language experts. The dialogue did not make cohesive sense following editing and so new dialogue was constructed and dubbed during post production.

=== Title ===
On September 10, 2012, Paramount confirmed the film's title as Star Trek Into Darkness. Abrams had indicated that unlike some of the earlier films in the franchise, his second Star Trek would not include a number in its title. This decision was made to avoid repeating the sequel numbering which began with Star Trek II: The Wrath of Khan, or making a confusing jump from Star Trek to Star Trek 12. Lindelof addressed the team's struggle to agree on a title: "There have been more conversations about what we're going to call it than went into actually shooting it... There's no word that comes after the colon after Star Trek that's cool. Not that Star Trek: Insurrection or First Contact aren't good titles, it's just that everything that people are turned off about when it comes to Trek is represented by the colon". Of the titles proposed, he joked that he preferred Star Trek: Transformers 4 best because the title is "technically available".

== Themes ==
On May 10, 2013, Cho, Pegg, and Eve were interviewed on The Bob Rivers Show to promote the film. Rivers asked about the title: "The title Star Trek Into Darkness indicates some sort of ominous turn, obviously". Eve suggested that Pegg discuss the theme of terrorism, and Pegg obliged: "I think it's a very current film, and it reflects certain things that are going on in our own heads at the moment; this idea that our enemy might be walking among us, not necessarily on the other side of an ocean, you know. John Harrison, Benedict Cumberbatch's character, is ambiguous, you know? We [the characters in the film] don't know who to support. Sometimes, Kirk, he seems to be acting in exactly the same way as him [Harrison]. They're both motivated by revenge. And the Into Darkness in the title is less an idea of this new trend of po-faced, kind of, everything's-got-to-be-a-bit-dour treatments of essentially childish stories. It's more about Kirk's indecision." Cho agreed about the characterization of Captain Kirk: "It's his crisis of leadership."

The pivotal scene near the end when Kirk enters the reactor chamber serves as a role reversal of a similar pivotal scene in Star Trek II: The Wrath of Khan.

Originally conceived as a retelling of Heart of Darkness by Joseph Conrad, Kurtzman and Orci defined the main theme of Into Darkness as "how far will we go to exact vengeance and justice on an enemy that scares us. How far should we go from our values?" They added that running from personal values is a personal struggle, where "the enemy's blood is within us; we are the enemy. We must not succumb to it; we are the same."

== Music ==
Composer Michael Giacchino composed the film's incidental music. Into Darkness was Giacchino's fourth film collaboration with Abrams, which included Star Trek (2009). The film score was recorded at the Sony Scoring Stage in Culver City, California from March 5 to April 3, 2013. Its soundtrack album was released digitally on May 14, 2013, and was made available on May 28 through Varèse Sarabande. The score contains the original Star Trek theme by Alexander Courage.

On April 24, 2013, it was announced that British singer Bo Bruce and Irish songwriter Gary Lightbody of Snow Patrol had collaborated on a song for the film's soundtrack entitled "The Rage That's In Us All". Australian songwriter and producer Robert Conley co-wrote a track with Penelope Austin, "The Dark Collide".

An expanded soundtrack album was released on July 28, 2014, limited to 6,000 copies.

=== Promotional tours ===
The cast (except for Anton Yelchin, Bruce Greenwood, and Peter Weller) participated in May 2013 press junkets. On May 7, Pegg appeared on Jimmy Kimmel Live!. On May 8, Quinto was interviewed on Late Night with Jimmy Fallon. He was followed on May 10 by Cumberbatch (who told Fallon that his fans are called "Cumberbitches"; Fallon countered that his are called "FalPals") and on May 17 by Saldana. Saldana said that she lobbied Abrams for four years: "If we make a sequel, Uhura needs to kick ass". On May 9, Cumberbatch appeared on the Late Show with David Letterman.

On May 10, Cho, Pegg, and Eve had a radio interview on The Bob Rivers Show. They discussed approaching a body of work already mastered by an earlier generation of actors, agreeing that they would remain with the franchise as long as it lasted. That night, Chris Pine appeared on the Late Show with David Letterman; Letterman showed a gag reel of robots in a black-and-white film before showing a clip from Into Darkness. Pine said that he had to gain weight for the role of Captain Kirk.

One story told by cast members during the promotion concerned an on-set prank initially devised by Pegg, which he later noted grew out of proportion. While filming at the National Ignition Facility, Pegg and Pine (with the crew's help) tricked the arriving actors into believing there was "ambient radiation" at the location and they had to wear "neutron cream" to avoid being burned by it. Cumberbatch was tricked into signing a release (which was meant to give the joke away, but he signed it without reading it), while Urban and Cho were tricked into recording a public service announcement about the necessity for neutron cream.

On May 13, Abrams appeared on The Daily Show with Jon Stewart, and on May 16, Pine appeared on The Ellen DeGeneres Show. On May 14, Abrams, Zachary Quinto, Pine, and Alice Eve appeared on The Urgant Show (Russian: Вечерний Ургант) in Russia.

== Release ==
=== Marketing ===
As part of a contest Abrams designed after the release of Super 8 (2011), the prize for answering a series of questions would be walk-on roles for two people in Into Darkness. He debuted three frames of the film on Conan on October 4, 2012, showing what he described as Spock "in a volcano, in this crazy suit". The official poster for the film was released two months later on December 3, 2012, showing a mysterious figure (thought to be Benedict Cumberbatch's villain) standing on a pile of burning rubble looking over what appears to be a damaged London; he is standing in a hole in the shape of the Starfleet insignia, blown out of the side of a building.

About nine minutes of the opening sequence was shown before IMAX presentations of The Hobbit: An Unexpected Journey, which was released in the United States on December 14, 2012. Alice Eve, Cumberbatch, and Burk unveiled the IMAX prologue in London, England on December 14. A two-minute teaser was released in iTunes Movie Trailers on December 17. The teaser marked the beginning of a viral marketing campaign, with a hidden link directing fans to a movie-related website. A 30-second teaser premiered February 3, 2013, during the stadium blackout of Super Bowl XLVII. The same day, Paramount released apps for Android, iPhone, and Windows Phone which enabled users to unlock tickets for showtimes two days before the film's release date.

An international trailer was released on March 21, 2013, with an embedded URL revealing an online-only international poster. On April 8, Paramount released the final international one-sheet featuring solely Benedict Cumberbatch's character.

On April 12, 2013, iTunes Movie Trailers revealed the final domestic one-sheet featuring USS Enterprise, and announced that the final US domestic trailer would be released on April 16. In the days leading up to the trailer release, character posters featuring Kirk, Spock, Uhura, and Harrison were released on iTunes. Paramount attempted to broaden the film's appeal to international audiences, an area where Star Trek and other science-fiction films had generally performed poorly. Into Darkness was dedicated to post-9/11 veterans. J. J. Abrams is connected with The Mission Continues, and a section of the film's website is dedicated to that organization.

=== Theatrical ===
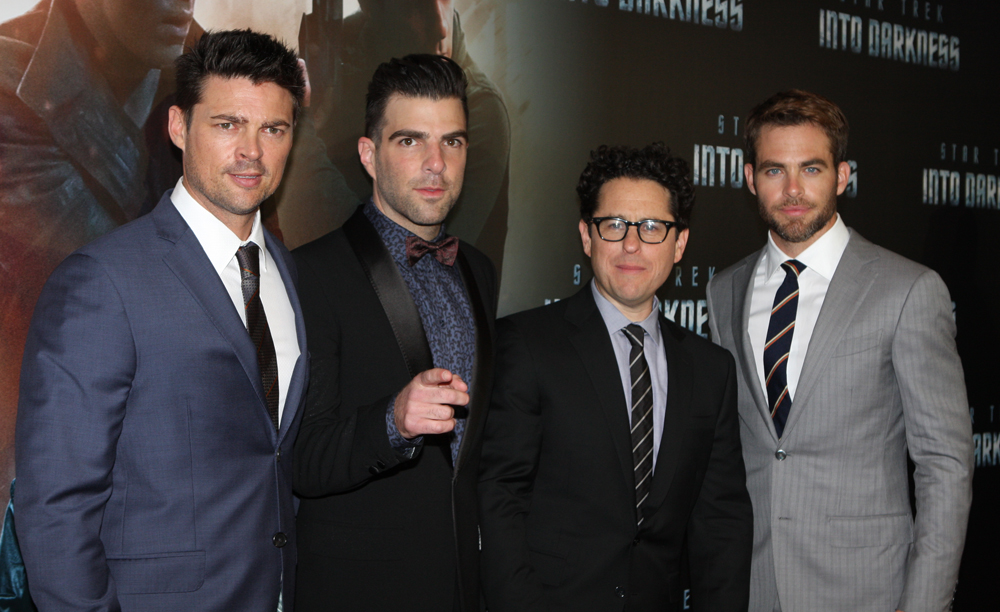
Karl Urban, Zachary Quinto, J. J. Abrams, and Chris Pine at the film's Australian premiere in April 2013

Dolby Laboratories and Paramount announced that Star Trek Into Darkness would be released in Dolby Atmos, with Andy Nelson and Anna Behlmer handling the mix with supervision from Ben Burtt and Matthew Wood at Lucasfilm's Skywalker Sound. The film was released on May 9, 2013, in international markets and May 16, 2013, in the United States.

=== Home media ===
Star Trek Into Darkness was released as a digital download on August 20, 2013. It was first released on DVD, Blu-ray, and Blu-ray 3D in the United Kingdom on September 2 and in the United States and Canada on September 10. There is also a Special Limited Edition Blu-ray set available with a model on a stand of USS Vengeance as seen in this movie.

In North America, the release was split into various retailer exclusives. Retailer Best Buy had an exclusive Blu-ray edition with 30 minutes of additional content. Target's Blu-ray edition also had 30 minutes of additional content that is different from Best Buy's. Online retailer iTunes' version comes with audio commentary for the film not available in the retailer exclusives. A collection of deleted scenes was available exclusively via the Xbox SmartGlass second-screen app paired with the Xbox Video release of the film.

The split of the special features between various retailers has attracted criticism from fans. In particular, The Digital Bits' editor Bill Hunt remarked that "taking fully half or more of the disc-based special features created for a major Blu-ray release and casting them to the winds as retailer exclusives, thus forcing your customers to go on an expensive scavenger hunt is, I'm sorry, absolutely outrageous. Seriously, if Paramount is going to treat its Blu-ray customers like this, they should just get out of the business altogether. Or better yet, farm all their titles out to third party licensees who will treat these films and Blu-ray customers in general with greater care and respect." Weeks after posting his article, Hunt himself was invited by Paramount to discuss about the issue of giving away the film's special features to different retail partners. He suggested "[putting] together the true special edition that should have been delivered from the start, with all of the extras that got scattered around to different retailers, including the enhanced audio commentary, plus all-new content just for this release... [and] to consider offering the IMAX version of the film ..."

== Reception ==
=== Box office ===
Into Darkness earned $13.5 million on its opening day in the United States and Canada, lower than Star Trek's $30.9 million. The film earned $21.6 million the following Friday, also lower than its predecessor's earnings four years earlier ($26 million). It earned $70.6 million during its opening weekend, finishing in the US box-office top spot (above The Great Gatsby and Iron Man 3). Total weekend earnings were $84.1 million, including the early-showing grosses. Although these were lower than Paramount's projected box-office earnings, studio vice-chairman Rob Moore said he was "extremely pleased" with the sequel's performance.

Several weeks after release, the film grossed $147 million at the foreign box office, surpassing the lifetime international earnings of its predecessor. Into Darkness reached the top spot of China's box office with a $25.8 million gross, tripling the overall earnings of the previous film during its opening weekend. Star Trek Into Darkness ended its North American theatrical run on September 12, 2013, with a box office total of $228,778,661, which places it as the 11th highest-grossing film for 2013. It earned $467,365,246 worldwide, ranking it in 14th place for 2013, and making it the highest-grossing film of the franchise.

Scott Mendelson of Forbes contends that the film's box office performance was the result of Paramount's inability to sell the basic components of the film's story, and inclusion of Khan "for little reason other than marketability and then spent the next year or so lying to everyone and claiming said villain wasn't in the picture [...] With no added value elements to sell, Paramount was forced to craft a generic campaign based around Benedict Cumberbatch as "Generic Bad Guy", so the excitement never took hold [...] This was adding to the idea that merely withholding basic story elements is tantamount to promising stunning plot twists [...] and it made fans and general moviegoers less excited about Star Trek 2 than they were four, three, or even two years ago." Calculating in all expenses, Deadline Hollywood estimated that the film made a profit of $29.9 million.

=== Critical response ===
On Rotten Tomatoes, the film has an approval rating of 84% based on 295 reviews, with an average rating of 7.4/10. The site's consensus reads, "Visually spectacular and suitably action packed, Star Trek Into Darkness is a rock-solid installment in the venerable sci-fi franchise, even if it's not as fresh as its predecessor." On Metacritic, the film has a weighted average score of 72 out of 100, based on 43 critics, indicating "generally favorable reviews". Audiences polled by CinemaScore gave the film an average grade of "A" on an A+ to F scale.

Critics called it a "rousing adventure" and "a riveting action-adventure in space". Cumberbatch's performance attracted praise from critics, with Peter Travers of Rolling Stone calling it a "tour de force to reckon with" and his character "a villain for the ages". Joe Neumaier of the New York Daily News wrote that Cumberbatch delivered "one of the best blockbuster villains in recent memory". Jonathan Romney of The Independent noted Cumberbatch's voice, saying it was "so sepulchrally resonant that it could have been synthesised from the combined timbres of Ian McKellen, Patrick Stewart, and Alan Rickman holding an elocution contest down a well". The New York Times praised his screen presence: "He fuses Byronic charisma with an impatient, imperious intelligence that seems to raise the ambient I.Q. whenever he's on screen".

However, not all of the reviews were positive; The Independent said the film would "underwhelm even the Trekkies". A.O. Scott dismissed the film in The New York Times: "It's uninspired hackwork, and the frequent appearance of blue lens flares does not make this movie any more of a personal statement". Nicholas Meyer, director of Star Trek II: The Wrath of Khan (from which the film borrows and remakes some scenes), revealed in 2018 that he had been disappointed with the film. He was quoted as saying:

In my sort of artistic worldview, if you're going to do an homage, you have to add something. You have to put another layer on it, and they didn't. Just by putting the same words in different characters' mouths didn't add up to anything, and if you have someone dying in one scene and sort of being resurrected immediately after, there's no real drama going on. It just becomes a gimmick or gimmicky, and that's what I found it to be, ultimately.

The film was criticized for a scene with actress Alice Eve's character Carol Marcus, stripping down in her underwear to change into a specialized jumpsuit, which was called "wholly unnecessary", the "male gaze", "eye candy", and "gratuitous". Screenwriter and producer Damon Lindelof apologized on Twitter for the scene: "I take responsibility and will be more mindful in the future". On Conan, Abrams addressed the matter by debuting a deleted scene of actor Benedict Cumberbatch's character Khan taking a shower. Eve addressed the underwear controversy at a 2013 Las Vegas Star Trek Convention and said, "I didn't know it would cause such a ruckus. I didn't feel exploited." In a 2021 interview for Inverse, Eve defended the scene again by saying, "I'm proud of that scene, and all the work I did."

==== Allegations of whitewashing ====
The second one, where Benedict Cumberbatch played Khan, I thought was unfortunate. Benedict Cumberbatch is a wonderful actor. I love everything that he's done, but if he was going to be playing that character, J.J. should have made him an original character that's singular to him. Because the Khan character first appeared in our TV series, "Space Seed" and Ricardo Montalbán was sensational in our second movie—he was the title character, The Wrath of Khan, you know! The other thought that Gene Roddenberry always had in the back of his mind—and that was his philosophy—was to embrace the diversity of this planet.

— George Takei, who originated the role of Hikaru Sulu and appeared in Star Trek films and TV episodes

Despite an acclaimed performance from Cumberbatch, Christian Blauvelt of Hollywood.com criticized the casting of the actor as Khan Noonien Singh, saying that the character had been "whitewashed into oblivion", since Khan is an explicitly non-white character in the Star Trek canon (introduced as a Sikh and former ruler of much of eastern Eurasia). There have been similar accusations of whitewashing by fans and American Sikhs, with Star Trek: Voyager actor Garrett Wang tweeting "The casting of Cumberbatch was a mistake on the part of the producers. I am not being critical of the actor or his talent, just the casting." George Takei, the original Hikaru Sulu, was also disappointed with the casting, as he thought it would have been better to cast Cumberbatch not as an established villain like Khan but as a new character.

On Trekmovie.com, co-producer and co-screenwriter Bob Orci addressed Khan's casting: "Basically, as we went through the casting process and we began honing in on the themes of the movie, it became uncomfortable for me to support demonizing anyone of color, particularly any one of Middle Eastern descent or anyone evoking that. One of the points of the movie is that we must be careful about the villain within US, not some other race".

An in-canon comic book has subsequently been created to retcon Khan's hitherto unexplained change in race in the film.

==== J. J. Abrams retrospective ====
In an interview with BuzzFeed two years after the film's release, Abrams addressed some of the film's shortcomings. He thought that the dynamic for Kirk and Spock's relationship in the film "wasn't really clear". For keeping the identity of Khan a secret prior to the film's release, Abrams felt he "was trying to preserve the fun for the audience, and not just tell them something that the characters don't learn for 45 minutes into the movie, so the audience wouldn't be so ahead of it." In the end, Abrams recognized that:

there were certain things I was unsure of [...] Any movie [...] has a fundamental conversation happening during it. And [for Into Darkness,] I didn't have it [...] [The problems with the plot] was not anyone's fault but mine, or, frankly, anyone's problem but mine. [The script] was a little bit of a collection of scenes that were written by my friends [...] And yet, I found myself frustrated by my choices, and unable to hang my hat on an undeniable thread of the main story. So then I found myself on that movie basically tap-dancing as well as I could to try and make the sequences as entertaining as possible [...] I would never say that I don't think that the movie ended up working. But I feel like it didn't work as well as it could have had I made some better decisions before we started shooting.

== See also ==
- Wikipedia Star Trek Into Darkness debate
- Star Trek film series
- List of adventure films of the 2010s
- List of films featuring extraterrestrials
- List of science fiction films of the 2010s
- Whitewashing in film
