= Teen Choice Award for Choice Movie Scene Stealer =

Entertainment award category

The following is a list of Teen Choice Award winners and nominees for Choice Movie Scene Stealer. Formally awarded as two separate categories from 2010 to 2012: Choice Movie Male Scene Stealer and Choice Movie Female Scene Stealer.

== Winners and nominees ==
=== 2010s ===
2010	Choice Movie – Male Scene Stealer	
2010	Kellan Lutz – The Twilight Saga: New Moon	Sean Combs – Get Him to the Greek George Lopez – Valentine's Day James Marsden – Death at a Funeral Mark Wahlberg – Date Night
2010	Choice Movie – Female Scene Stealer	
2010	Ashley Greene – The Twilight Saga: New Moon	Dakota Fanning – The Twilight Saga: New Moon Anne Hathaway – Alice in Wonderland and Valentine's Day Anna Kendrick – The Twilight Saga: New Moon and Up in the Air Betty White – The Proposal
2011	Choice Movie – Male Scene Stealer	
2011	Kellan Lutz – The Twilight Saga: Eclipse	Andrew Garfield – The Social Network Riley Griffiths – Super 8 Ken Jeong – The Hangover Part II Justin Timberlake – The Social Network
2011	Choice Movie – Female Scene Stealer	
2011	Ashley Greene – The Twilight Saga: Eclipse	Crystal the Monkey – The Hangover Part II Mila Kunis – Black Swan Melissa McCarthy – Bridesmaids Aly Michalka – The Roommate and Easy A
2012	Choice Movie – Male Scene Stealer	
2012	Liam Hemsworth – The Hunger Games	Chace Crawford – What to Expect When You're Expecting Chris Evans – The Avengers Kevin Hart – Think Like a Man Kellan Lutz – The Twilight Saga: Breaking Dawn – Part 1
2012	Choice Movie – Female Scene Stealer	
2012	Ashley Greene – The Twilight Saga: Breaking Dawn – Part 1	Elizabeth Banks – The Hunger Games Lea Michele – New Year's Eve Nikki Reed – The Twilight Saga: Breaking Dawn – Part 1 Nicole Scherzinger – Men in Black 3
2013	Kellan Lutz – The Twilight Saga: Breaking Dawn – Part 2	Joseph Gordon-Levitt – The Dark Knight Rises Hana Mae Lee – Pitch Perfect Ben Platt – Pitch Perfect Channing Tatum – G.I. Joe: Retaliation
2014	Nat Wolff – The Fault in Our Stars	Sam Claflin – The Hunger Games: Catching Fire Nicholas Hoult – X-Men: Days of Future Past Anthony Mackie – Captain America: The Winter Soldier Elliot Page (Note: Credited as Ellen Page) – X-Men: Days of Future Past
2015	Chris Evans – Avengers: Age of Ultron	Adam DeVine – Pitch Perfect 2 Green Bay Packers – Pitch Perfect 2 Nicholas Hoult – Mad Max: Fury Road Hailee Steinfeld – Pitch Perfect 2 Miles Teller – The Divergent Series: Insurgent
2016	Jena Malone – The Hunger Games: Mockingjay – Part 2	Chadwick Boseman – Captain America: Civil War Gal Gadot – Batman v Superman: Dawn of Justice Tom Holland – Captain America: Civil War Evan Peters – X-Men: Apocalypse Miles Teller – The Divergent Series: Allegiant
