= Jay Scully =

American actor

Jay Scully is an actor, casting director and producer.

He is best known for his role as Lieutenant Chapin in Star Trek Into Darkness. In 2011, he played the role of a deputy sheriff in the film Super 8. In 2010 he played the role of Lance in the TV series Undercovers. In 1990, he appeared in the TV series Against the Law, playing the role of a sharpshooter. He has been casting director for 45 films. In 2013, he worked as casting director for three films that were still in production or pre-production: Monster Butler; I Want My Baby Back; and a reprise of a horror film entitled The Strangers 2. In 2012, he was the casting director for American Reunion. He was co-producer for the films On the Doll and Little Athens, and he served as associate producer for the film Dream.
