= Kings of the Evening =

2007 film directed by Andrew P. Jones

Kings of the Evening is a 2007 drama film directed and produced independently by Andrew P. Jones.

== Plot ==
The story follows main character Homer Hobbs (Tyson Beckford) as he travels in the Great Depression of the 1930s. Hobbs is a young African-American man who concludes his 2-year jail sentence and returns to his bleak hometown with a lack of opportunities. Here he meets four strangers Clarence (Glynn Turman), Gracie (Lynn Whitfield), Benny (Reginald T. Dorsey), Lucy (Linara Washington), all finding themselves in similar positions. Together they participate in activities that provide hope that there is a way to escape, even if just for the evening.

== Cast ==
- Tyson Beckford as Homer Hobbs
- Glynn Turman as Clarence
- Lynn Whitfield as Gracie
- Reginald T Dorsey as Benny
- Linara Washington as Lucy
- Bruce McGill as Mr. Cheedle
- James Russo as Ramsey
- Lou Myers as Counter Man
- Willard E. Pugh as Henry
- Ryan Lee as Beggar

== Character synopsis ==
Homer Hobbs (Tyson Beckford) rents a room in a boarding house run by a firm hand (Lynn Whitfield), a beautiful yet weary woman who has had a hard life. Homer has now begun to discover himself and lands a job at a cement factory. Kind hearted Clarence (Glynn Turman) feels marginalized to barely existing on his slow to arrive government checks. Benny (Reginald Dorsey) is a sharp dresser who is jobless. Lucy (Linara Washington) is pretty and vivacious while she works long hours as a seamstress in a sweatshop, dreaming to open her own dress shop.

== Production ==
Director/Producer Andrew P. Jones co-wrote the screenplay with his father, Robert Page Jones, who drew upon his youth during the Great Depression. Reginald T. Dorsey also served as a producer on the movie and played Benny.

== Release ==
Kings of the Evening has a MPAA rating: PG for thematic elements, language throughout, some violence and smoking. Running time is 1 hour, 40 minutes. Genre is period drama with a domestic total gross of $99,270.
