= Glynn Turman =

American actor (born 1947)

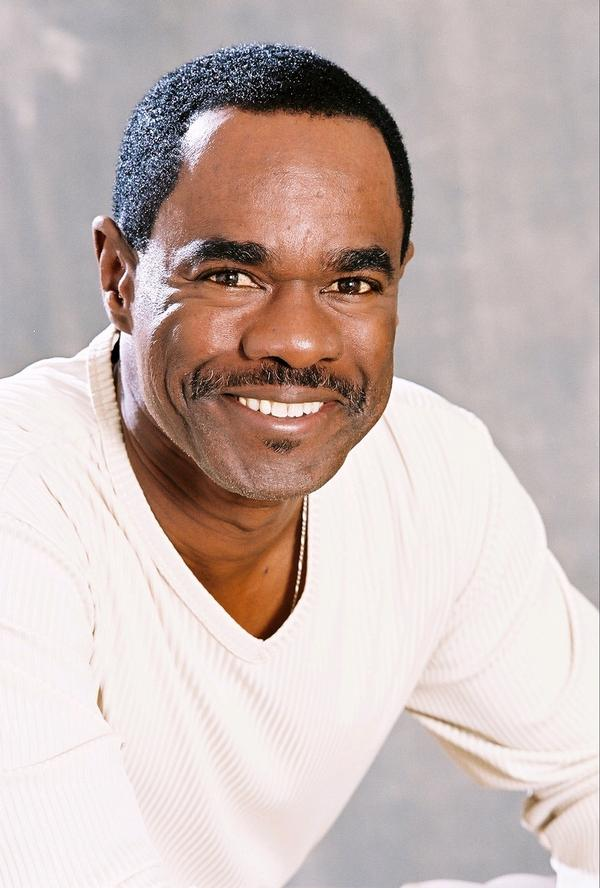
- Turman in 2007
- Born: Glynn Russell Turman; January 31, 1947 (age 79); New York City, U.S.
- Occupation: Actor
- Years active: 1959–present
- Known for: Leroy "Preach" Jackson – Cooley High; Colonel Bradford Taylor – A Different World; Clarence Royce – The Wire
- Spouses: Ula Walker (m. 1965; div. 1971) Aretha Franklin (m. 1978; div. 1984) Jo-Ann Allen (m. 1992)
- Children: 4

Glynn Russell Turman (born January 31, 1947) is an American actor. First coming to attention as a child actor in the original 1959 Broadway production of A Raisin in the Sun, Turman is known for his roles as Lew Miles on the prime-time soap opera Peyton Place (1968–1969), high school student Leroy "Preach" Jackson in the 1975 coming-of-age film Cooley High, math professor and retired Army colonel Bradford Taylor on the NBC sitcom A Different World (1988–1993), and Baltimore mayor Clarence Royce on the HBO drama series The Wire. He received the Primetime Emmy Award for Outstanding Guest Actor in a Drama Series for his role on the HBO drama series In Treatment.

Turman also portrayed Jeremiah Kaan on the Showtime series House of Lies, Doctor Senator in the fourth season of the FX black comedy crime drama series Fargo, and starred in the 2020 Netflix film Ma Rainey's Black Bottom.

== Early life ==
Turman was born in New York City. According to a DNA analysis, Turman shares maternal ancestry with the Edo people of Nigeria. Turman studied at High School of Performing Arts located in the Manhattan borough of New York City, graduating in 1965.

== Career ==
Turman had his first prominent acting role at the age of 12 as Travis Younger in the original Broadway production of Lorraine Hansberry's classic play, A Raisin in the Sun, opposite Sidney Poitier, Ruby Dee, Claudia McNeil, Ivan Dixon, Louis Gossett Jr., Lonne Elder III, John Fiedler and Diana Sands. After graduating high school, he apprenticed in regional and repertory companies throughout the US, including Tyrone Guthrie's Repertory Theatre, in which he performed in late 1960s productions of Good Boys, Harper's Ferry, The Visit, and The House of Atreus. He made his Los Angeles stage debut in William Hanley’s Slow Dance on the Killing Ground. A 1974 performance in The Wine Sellers earned him a Los Angeles Critics Award nomination and a Dramalogue Award. The play was also produced on Broadway as What The Wine Sellers Buy.

Turman won his first NAACP Image Award for his work in the play Eyes of the American. He received his second NAACP Image award for directing Deadwood Dick at the Inner City Cultural Center in Los Angeles.

On television, he has directed episodes of The Parent 'Hood, Hangin' with Mr. Cooper, A Different World, and The Wayans Bros.

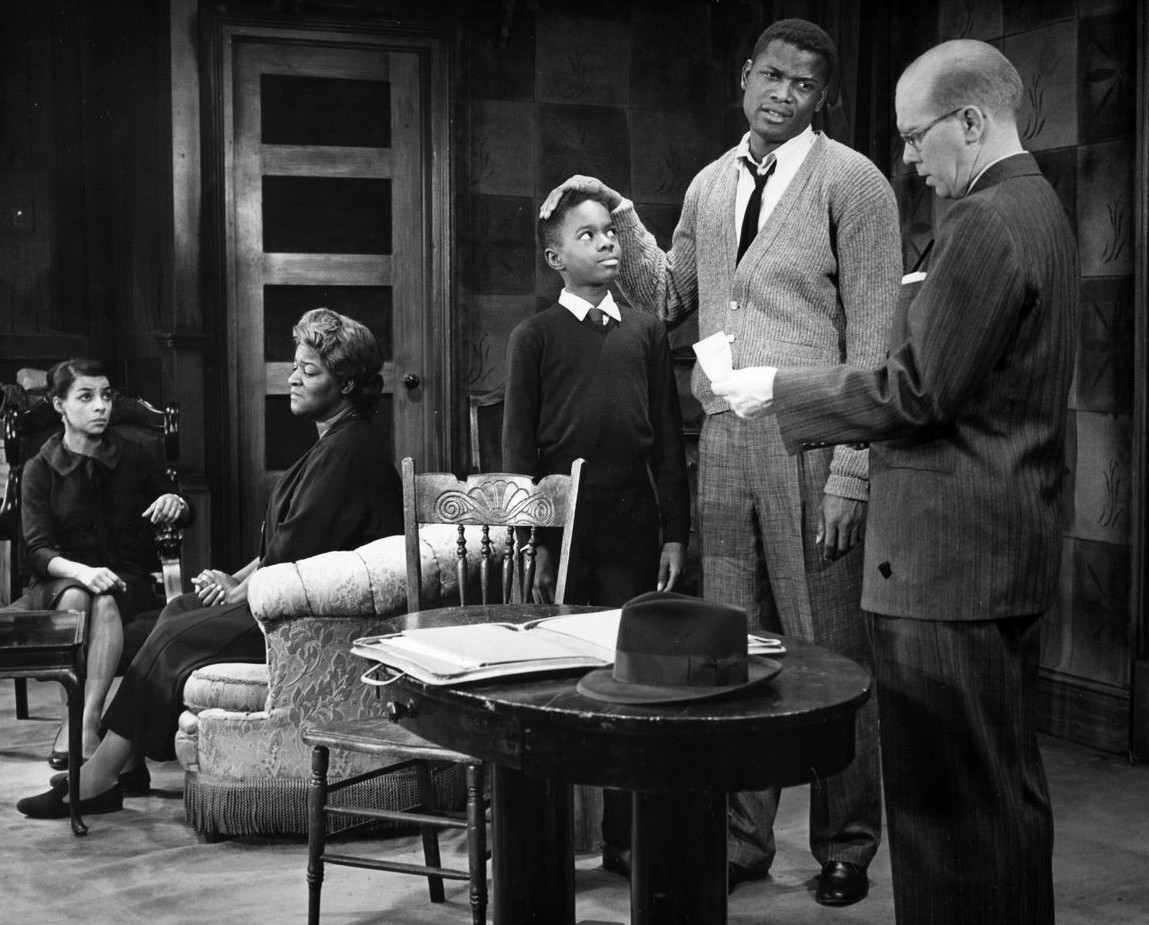
Turman on Broadway in A Raisin in the Sun. L-R: Ruby Dee, Claudia McNeil, Glynn Turman, Sidney Poitier, and John Fiedler.

Turman began his film career in the 1970s with blaxploitation flicks including Five on the Black Hand Side (1973), Thomasine & Bushrod (1974) and Together Brothers (1974), then progressed to roles in Cooley High (1975), plus The River Niger (1976), J. D.'s Revenge (1976) and A Hero Ain't Nothin' but a Sandwich (1978). TV movies included Carter's Army, the prestigious Centennial, Attica, and Minstrel Man, for which he won his third NAACP Image Award.

Turman appeared in TV movies Race to Freedom: The Underground Railroad in 1994, Buffalo Soldiers, and Freedom Song. More notable films include Penitentiary II (1982), Gremlins (1984), Deep Cover (1992), How Stella Got Her Groove Back (1998), Men of Honor (2000), Sahara (2005), Kings of the Evening (2007), Burlesque (2010) and Super 8 (2011). In 2004, he joined the HBO series The Wire portraying the recurring role of Mayor Clarence Royce, becoming a full-time regular in 2006. His portrayal of Mayor Royce earned him an NAACP Image Award nomination for Outstanding Supporting Actor in a Drama Series in 2007.

Since The Wire, Turman guest-starred as a patient in the Scrubs episode "My Last Words". Turman's other television appearances include Hawaii Five-O (as Harley Dartson, 1973, "Tricks Are Not Treats"), the Twilight Zone segment "Paladin of the Lost Hour" (co-starring Danny Kaye with a script by Harlan Ellison), Matlock, Millennium, and the sitcom All of Us. In 2008, he won a Primetime Emmy award for his guest appearance on the HBO series In Treatment. He appeared in the ABC series Detroit 1-8-7. He has performed and produced a one-man show, Movin' Man, about his life.

Turman auditioned for the role of Han Solo in Star Wars. In a 2007 interview, Turman recalled: "That was in George Lucas' book. Apparently George Lucas had me in mind for the role, and then thought that there might be too much controversy between a white Princess Leia and a black Han Solo – because those were the times – and he didn't want to get into that. At the time, I had no idea. I just went to the audition, did it and got out of there." In 2012, he began appearing in House of Lies on Showtime as the father of the characters played by Don Cheadle and Larenz Tate. In 2016, he appeared in the Oprah Winfrey Network TV show Queen Sugar in which he played the father, Ernest Bordelon.

In 2017, Turman was cast as Nate Lahey Sr. in 10 episodes in seasons 4 and 5 of the ABC drama How to Get Away With Murder. His character is the imprisoned father of Nate Lahey (Billy Brown), a former police officer, detective and lover to series star Annalise Keating (Viola Davis). In 2018, Turman appeared on the legal drama Suits as Vic.

Turman recently appeared in the ABC limited series Women of the Movement in 2021, playing Mose Wright, Emmett Till's great-uncle. Turman also makes a cameo appearance as Mickey in 80 for Brady opposite Rita Moreno, Lily Tomlin, Jane Fonda and Sally Field.

Turman founded Camp Gid D Up to teach horse skills and values to urban youth in southern California and has been co-grand marshal for the Bill Pickett Invitational Rodeo, celebrating black cowboys, for nearly 40 years.

== Filmography ==
=== Film ===
Year	Title	Role	Notes
1971	Honky	Sailor	
1972	A.W.O.L.	Mohammed G.	
1973	Five on the Black Hand Side	Gideon Brooks	
1974	Thomasine & Bushrod	Jomo J. Anderson	
1974	The Nine Lives of Fritz the Cat	(voice)	
1974	Together Brothers	Dr. Johnson	
1975	Cooley High	Leroy "Preach" Jackson	
1976	The River Niger	Jeff Williams	
1976	J. D.'s Revenge	Isaac "Ike" Hendrix	
1977	The Serpent's Egg	Monroe	
1978	A Hero Ain't Nothin' but a Sandwich	Nigeria	
1982	Penitentiary II	Charles Johnson	
1984	Gremlins	Roy Hanson	
1986	Out of Bounds	Lieutenant Delgado	
1992	Deep Cover	Russell Stevens Sr.	
1994	The Inkwell	Spencer Phillips	
1996	Subterfuge	Stallworth Hubbs	
1996	Psalms from the Underground	-	Short
1998	How Stella Got Her Groove Back	Dr. Shakespeare	
1999	Light It Up	Principal Allan Armstrong	
2000	The Visit	Parole Board Member Reingold	
2000	Men of Honor	Chief Floyd	
2001	Air Rage	Ted Bigelow	Video
2004	The Seat Filler	Derrick's Dad	
2005	Sahara	Dr. Frank Hopper	
2007	City Teacher	Kevin Sawyer	
2007	Kings of the Evening	Clarence Brown	
2009	Preaching to the Pastor	Bishop Hightower	
2010	Takers	Chief Detective Duncan	
2010	Burlesque	Harold Saint	
2011	Bright	Beamon	Short
2011	Supremacy	Frank Walker	Short
2011	Super 8	Dr. Woodward	
2011	Forcin' the Blues	-	Short
2012	John Dies at the End	Detective Appleton	
2012	Who Killed Soul Glow?	-	
2012	The Obama Effect	Slim Sugar	
2012	The Pastor's Secrets	-	
2013	Act Like You Love Me	David	
2014	Dakota's Summer	Isaac Benson	
2015	Last Chance	Judge Kramer	Short
2016	Juney Smith's Black American Film Collection	City Teacher 1	Video
2016	Race	Harry Davis	
2018	Solace	Clay	
2018	Bumblebee	General Whalen	
2019	Windows on the World	Lou	
2019	Justine	Papa Don	
2019	Sextuplets	Leland	
2020	The Way Back	Doc	
2020	Ma Rainey's Black Bottom	Toledo	
2022	The Devil You Know	Lloyd Cowans	
2023	80 for Brady	Mickey	
2023	Rustin	A. Philip Randolph	
2023	Outlaw Johnny Black	Bullseye Black	
2024	Horizon: An American Saga – Chapter 2	N/A	
2025	Straw	Richard	
TBA	Horizon: An American Saga – Chapter 3 †	TBA	Filming

=== Television ===
Year	Title	Role	Notes
1961	The Play of the Week	-	Episode: "Black Monday"
1968	Daktari	Usumbu	Episode: "Once Upon a Fang"
1968–69	Peyton Place	Lew Miles	Main cast (season 5)
1969	Julia	Jimmy James	Episode: "The Undergraduate" & "For Whom the Wedding Bell Tolls"
1969	CBS Playhouse	Jackson	Episode: "Sadbird"
1970–71	Room 222	Vic	Episode: "Dreams of Glory" & "Opportunity Room"
1970	Carter's Army	Pvt. George Brightman	TV movie
1971	In Search of America	Bodhi	TV movie
1971	Storefront Lawyers	-	Episode: "Marathon"
1971	Insight	Sam	Episode: "Bird on the Mast"
1972	The Mod Squad	Lonnie	Episode: "Kill Gently, Sweet Jessie"
1972	The Doris Day Show	Chris Davis	Episode: "The Great Talent Raid"
1973	Cannon	Jamal	Episode: "Deadly Heritage"
1973	Hawaii Five-O	Harley Dartson	Episode: "Tricks Are Not Treats"
1973	The Rookies	Jimmy Webster	Episode: "Blood Brother"
1975	Ceremonies in Dark Old Men	Theo	TV movie
1975	The Blue Knight	Edwin Beall	Episode: "Pilot"
1976–78	Visions	Axis	Episode: "The Tapestry/Circles" & "Charlie Smith and the Fritter Tree"
1977	Minstrel Man	Harry Brown, Jr.	TV movie
1977	The Tony Randall Show	William	Episode: "New Found Franklin"
1978	ABC Afterschool Special	Lenny Johnson	Episode: "The Rag Tag Champs"
1978	Katie: Portrait of a Centerfold	Preston de Cordiva	TV movie
1978	The Paper Chase	Raymond Livingston	Episode: "Moot Court"
1978–79	Centennial	Nate Person	Miniseries
1980	Attica	Raymond Franklin	TV movie
1980	The White Shadow	Ron Taylor	Episode: "A Few Good Men"
1980	Palmerstown, U.S.A.	C.J. Freeman	Episode: "The Old Sister"
1981	Thornwell	James Thornwell	TV movie
1982	The Greatest American Hero	Captain Le Clerc	Episode: "The Devil and the Deep Blue Sea"
1982	Cass Malloy	Officer Woodrow Freeman	Pilot for She's the Sheriff
1982	Fame	Ben Pettit	Episode: "Class Act"
1983	Manimal	Ty Earl	Episode: "Manimal"
1983	Lottery!	-	Episode: "Detroit: The Price of Freedom"
1984	The Love Boat	Tyrone	Episode: "Ace's Valet/Mother Comes First/Hit or Miss America"
1984	Fantasy Island	Joe Wilson	Episode: "Bojangles and the Dancer/Deuces Are Wild"
1984	Secrets of a Married Man	Jesse	TV movie
1984	T. J. Hooker	Norman Powell	Episode: "Anatomy of a Killing"
1984	Hot Pursuit	Mitch Simpson	Episode: "Goodbye... I Love You"
1984	This Is the Life	-	Episode: "Reprise for the Lord"
1985	Riptide	Tyrone Diamond	Episode: "Prisoner of War"
1985	American Playhouse	Joshua	Episode: "Charlotte Forten's Mission: Experiment in Freedom"
1985	Detective in the House	-	Episode: "Whatever Happened To...?"
1985	Hail to the Chief	LaRue Hawkes	Episode: "Pilot"
1985	The Twilight Zone	Billy Kinetta	Episode: "Teacher's Aide/Paladin of the Lost Hour"
1985	The Grand Baby	-	TV movie
1985	Murder, She Wrote	Ben Coleman	Episode: "Murder to a Jazz Beat"
1986	The Redd Foxx Show	Rod Tyler	Episode: "High School Blues"
1986	The Magical World of Disney	Lloyd Lyman	Episode: "Ask Max"
1986	Murder, She Wrote	Stan Lassiter	Episode: "Deadline for Murder"
1987	Matlock	Maj. Dennis Orlando	Episode: "The Court-Martial: Part 1 & 2"
1987	CBS Summer Playhouse	Roger Donnely	Episode: "Doctors Wilde"
1987	J.J. Starbuck	Lt. Caspersons	Episode: "Pilot"
1989	Murder, She Wrote	Earl Browder	Episode: "Jack and Bill"
1988–93	A Different World	Colonel Bradford Taylor	Main cast (season 2-6)
1990	Freddy's Nightmares	Dr. Redman	Episode: "Life Sentence"
1994	Race to Freedom: The Underground Railroad	Solomon	TV movie
1994	Someone Else's Child	Judge Roullard	TV movie
1996	The Lazarus Man	-	Episode: "Panorama"
1996	Rebound: The Legend of Earl "The Goat" Manigault	Coach Powell	TV movie
1996	Circle of Pain	-	TV movie
1997	Millennium	James Glen	Episode: "Wide Open"
1997	Buffalo Soldiers	Sgt. Joshua 'Joyu' Judges Ruth	TV movie
1999	The Magnificent Seven	Achilles Thompson	Episode: "Achilles"
2000	Freedom Song	T-Bone Lanier	TV movie
2000	Strange World	Wade Beecher	Episode: "Skin"
2000	Touched by an Angel	Sheriff Ernie Guthrie	Episode: "Finger of God"
2000–02	Resurrection Blvd.	Bobby Davis	Recurring cast
2001	Fire & Ice	Robert Aimes Sr.	TV movie
2001	Big Apple	Ted Olsen	Main cast
2001	JAG	Sub Captain	Episode: "Mixed Messages"
2003	The Lyon's Den	Phil Cherot	Episode: "Duty to Save"
2003	Law & Order: Criminal Intent	Roy Hines	Episode: "Pravda"
2004–05	The Bernie Mac Show	Carl McCullough	Episode: "Family Reunion" & "Who Gives This Bride"
2004–08	The Wire	Mayor Clarence V. Royce	Recurring cast (season 3), main cast (season 4), guest (season 5)
2006	Law & Order: Special Victims Unit	Dr. Young	Episode: "Infected"
2006	All of Us	Earl James	Recurring cast (season 4)
2008	Murder 101	Sheriff Bob Monroe	Episode: "New Age"
2008	Players at the Poker Palace	Black Bart	Episode: "The Shoot Out"
2008	Night Life	-	TV movie
2008	Cold Case	Al Towert	Episode: "Glory Days"
2008	ER	Mr. Holmes	Episode: "Parental Guidance"
2008–09	In Treatment	Alex Prince, Sr.	Supporting cast: season 1-2
2009	Scrubs	George Valentine	Episode: "My Last Words"
2009	Southland	Captain	Episode: "Two Gangs"
2009	FlashForward	Senator Noland	Episode: "Gimme Some Truth"
2010	Detroit 1-8-7	Reverend Clinton P. Huey	Episode: "Shelter"
2010–11	The Defenders	Judge Bob Owens	Recurring cast
2011	Funny or Die Presents	Chief Huckey	Episode #2.10
2012	Alcatraz	Emmitt Little	Episode: "Clarence Montgomery"
2012	NCIS: Los Angeles	James Pierce	Episode: "Out of the Past"
2012	Revolution	Major David Kipling	Episode: "Nobody's Fault But Mine"
2012–16	House of Lies	Jeremiah Kaan	Main cast
2013	Criminal Minds	Charles Johnson	Episode: "Strange Fruit"
2015	Proof	Colonel James Tyler	Episode: "St. Luke's"
2016–22	Queen Sugar	Ernest Bordelon	3 episodes
2017	Graves	Lenny	Episode: "Not All Who Wander Are Lost" & "Spark Meet Gasoline"
2017	Brothered Up	Frank Williams	TV movie
2018	Suits	Vic	Episode: "Bad Man"
2018–19	How to Get Away with Murder	Nate Lahey Sr.	Recurring cast (season 4-5)
2019	Better Things	Rocket	Episode: "Nesting"
2019	Documentary Now!	Julius Baxter	Episode: "Long Gone"
2019	American Gods	Reverend Hutchins	Episode: "The Ways of the Dead"
2019	The Red Line	Nathan Gordon	Recurring cast
2019	Claws	Calvin Sims	Recurring cast (season 3)
2019	Mr. Mercedes	Judge Bernard Raines	Recurring cast (season 3)
2019	Power	Gabriel	Episode: "No One Can Stop Me"
2020	Black-ish	Billy Blade	Episode: "Earl, Interrupted"
2020	Close Enough	(voice)	Episode: "Prank War/Cool Moms"
2020	Power Book II: Ghost	Gabriel	Episode: "Exceeding Expectations"
2020	Fargo	Doctor Senator	Recurring cast (season 4)
2021–23	Stillwater	Mr. Morgan (voice)	2 episodes
2022–23	The Proud Family: Louder and Prouder	Pa (voice)	2 episodes
2022	Women of the Movement	Mose Wright	Main role
2022	FBI: Most Wanted	Terry Daniels	Episode: "Greatest Hits"
2022	Guillermo del Toro's Cabinet of Curiosities	Sheriff Nate Craven	Episode: "The Autopsy"
2023	Black Cake	Charles Mitch	Recurring role
2023–present	Percy Jackson and the Olympians	Chiron	Recurring role
2024	The Big Cigar	Walter Newton	
2024	The Neighborhood	Otis (Tina's Father)	Episode: "Welcome To Daddy Issues" & "Welcome To The Wicked Stepmother"
2025	Paradise	Xavier's Father	Episode: "The Architect of Social Well-Being"
2026	Diarra from Detroit	Ron	Episode: "Mr. and Mrs. Ambien"

=== Podcasts ===
Year	Title	Role	Notes
2020	Day by Day	Rex (voice)	Episode: "Two Turtles"

== Awards and nominations ==
Year	Award	Category	Title	Result	Ref.
2007	NAACP Image Awards	Outstanding Supporting Actor in a Drama Series	The Wire	Nominated	
2008	Primetime Emmy Awards	Outstanding Guest Actor in a Drama Series	In Treatment	Won	
2008	San Diego Black Film Festival	Best Supporting Actor	Kings of the Evening	Won	
2015	NAACP Image Awards	Outstanding Supporting Actor in a Comedy Series	House of Lies	Nominated	
2019	Primetime Emmy Awards	Outstanding Guest Actor in a Drama Series	How to Get Away with Murder	Nominated	
2020	Los Angeles Film Critics Association	Best Supporting Actor	Ma Rainey's Black Bottom	Won	
2020	National Society of Film Critics	Best Supporting Actor	Ma Rainey's Black Bottom	Runner-up	
2021	Critics' Choice Television Awards	Best Supporting Actor in a Movie/Miniseries	Fargo	Nominated	
2021	Critics' Choice Movie Awards	Best Acting Ensemble	Ma Rainey's Black Bottom	Nominated	
2021	Independent Spirit Awards	Best Supporting Male	Ma Rainey's Black Bottom	Nominated	
2021	NAACP Image Awards	Outstanding Supporting Actor in a Motion Picture	Ma Rainey's Black Bottom	Nominated	
2021	NAACP Image Awards	Outstanding Ensemble Cast in a Motion Picture	Ma Rainey's Black Bottom	Won	
2021	Screen Actors Guild Awards	Outstanding Performance by a Cast in a Motion Picture	Ma Rainey's Black Bottom	Nominated	
