= Super 8 (2011 film) =

American film by J. J. Abrams

- Theatrical release poster
- Directed by: J. J. Abrams
- Written by: J. J. Abrams
- Produced by: Steven Spielberg; Bryan Burk; J. J. Abrams
- Starring: Kyle Chandler; Elle Fanning; Joel Courtney; Gabriel Basso; Noah Emmerich; Ron Eldard; Riley Griffiths; Ryan Lee; Zach Mills
- Cinematography: Larry Fong
- Edited by: Mary Jo Markey; Maryann Brandon
- Music by: Michael Giacchino
- Production companies: DreamWorks Pictures (Note: Uncredited as 'In association with' only.); Amblin Entertainment; Bad Robot Productions
- Distributed by: Paramount Pictures
- Release dates: June 9, 2011 (Australia); June 10, 2011 (United States)
- Running time: 112 minutes
- Country: United States
- Language: English
- Budget: $50 million
- Box office: $260.1 million

Super 8 is a 2011 American science fiction thriller film written and directed by J. J. Abrams, who produced with Steven Spielberg and Bryan Burk. The film's ensemble cast stars Kyle Chandler, Elle Fanning, Joel Courtney, Gabriel Basso, Noah Emmerich, Ron Eldard, Riley Griffiths, Ryan Lee, and Zach Mills. Set in 1979, the film follows a group of young teenagers who witness a mysterious train derailment while filming their own Super 8 movie and strange occurrences unfold in their small Ohio town.

Released on June 10, 2011, Super 8 received positive reviews from critics and was a box office success, grossing over $260 million worldwide. The film received numerous nominations and awards.

== Plot ==
In 1979, Deputy Sheriff Jack Lamb of Lillian, Ohio and his 14-year-old son Joe mourn the death of wife and mother Elizabeth in a workplace accident. Jack blames Elizabeth's co-worker Louis Dainard for the accident, as Dainard had a hangover, resulting in Elizabeth having to cover his shift. Joe clings to his mother's memory in the form of a locket.

Four months later, Joe's friend Charles is making a zombie movie for a Super 8 film competition. He enlists Joe's help along with friends Preston, Martin, and Cary, as well as Dainard's daughter, Alice. Though their fathers are opposed to their friendship, Joe and Alice become close.

One night while they film at a train depot, an approaching train is derailed by a pickup truck ramming it head-on, destroying the depot (with their camera capturing the event). After being scattered by the chaos and regrouping, the teenagers find crates of strange white cubes amid the wreckage, and discover the truck driver to be their biology teacher Dr. Woodward. Gravely injured, he warns them at gunpoint to forget what they have seen. They flee as a convoy from the local Air Force base, led by Col. Nelec, arrives. Nelec finds an empty Super 8 film box.

In the following days the town experiences strange events: dogs run away, townspeople go missing, the electrical power fluctuates, and electronic devices are stolen. Jack confronts Nelec regarding the events, but Nelec has him arrested. In a military hospital, Nelec questions Woodward but is rebuked, after which Nelec has him killed with a lethal injection. Later, Louis and Alice get into a fight, and she attempts to flee on her bike, and Louis chases after her in his car but gets into an accident. As Alice flees, a large creature abducts her.

Watching their footage, Joe and Charles notice the large creature escaping the train. Nelec orders flamethrowers to start a wildfire as an excuse to evacuate the residents to the base. Louis, while in recovery from his car accident, tells Joe the creature has abducted Alice. Joe, Charles, Martin, and Cary persuade Jen, Charles's older sister, to flirt with a store clerk into driving them to town to rescue Alice.

Breaking into Dr. Woodward's trailer, they learn of his work as a former government researcher: In 1963, the Air Force captured a crash-landing alien. Its spacecraft, composed of the white cubes, was able to shape-shift. While being experimented on, the alien physically established a psychic connection with Woodward, convincing him to help it escape Earth. His effort was sabotaged by Nelec, who discredited and discharged Woodward.

Nelec captures the teens, but the alien kills Nelec and his airmen, allowing them to escape. Jack escapes and agrees with Louis to put aside their differences to save their children. The military attacks the alien, but their hardware malfunctions in its presence, resulting in significant collateral damage. Joe and Cary find a vast tunnel system under the town. The missing townsfolk, including Alice, are hanging unconscious from the ceiling of a cavern. Here, the alien completes a device made from the missing electronics and attached to the base of the water tower. Using firecrackers as a distraction, Joe frees Alice and the others, but the alien dispatches all but Alice, Cary and Joe, who quietly speaks to it, convincing it that while bad things happen, it could "still live". Establishing an emotional connection between the two of them by grabbing Joe, the alien realizes that not all humans are as bad as Nelec, and allows the three teens to return to the surface.

Everyone watches as metal objects from the town are pulled to the top of the water tower by an unknown force, with the white cubes reassembling on it as a spaceship and, as the alien enters it, Elizabeth's locket is drawn toward the tower. Joe lets it go, completing the ship. As the ship rises into space, he takes Alice's hand.

The short film the teens were making in Super 8, "The Case", runs at the end of the movie beside the credit roll, ending with Charles's character asking for his short film to be picked for the film festival before being attacked by a zombie played by Alice.

== Cast ==
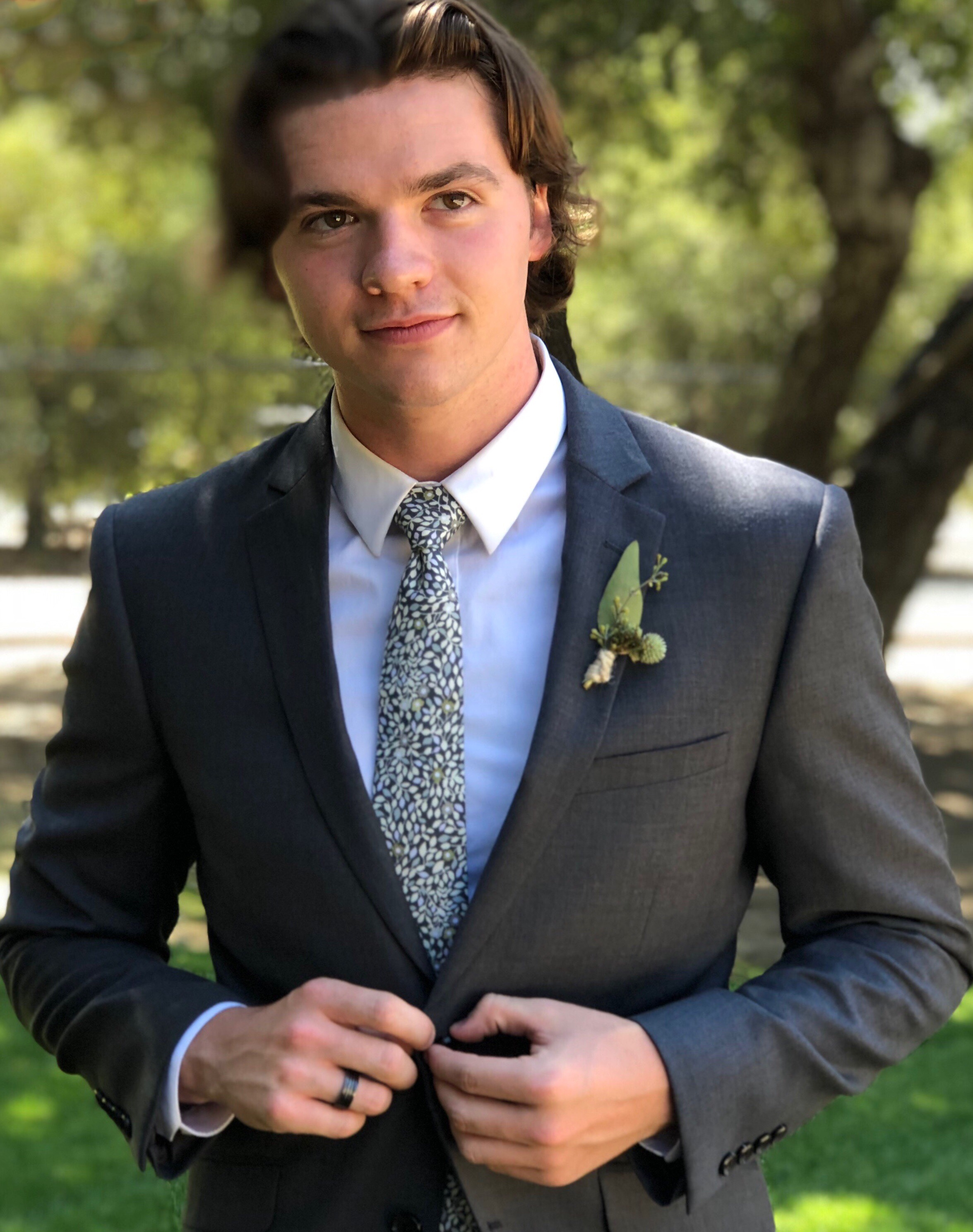
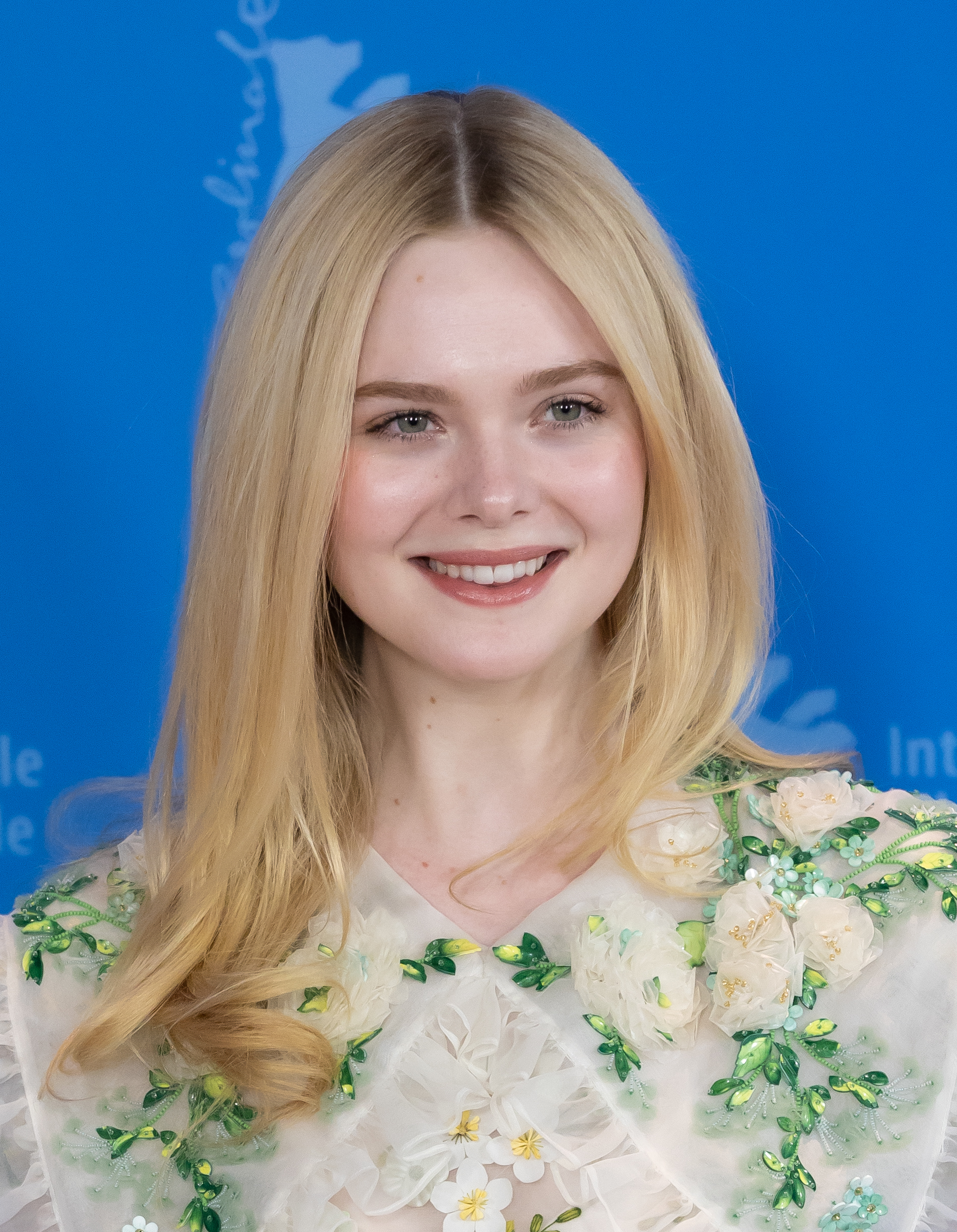
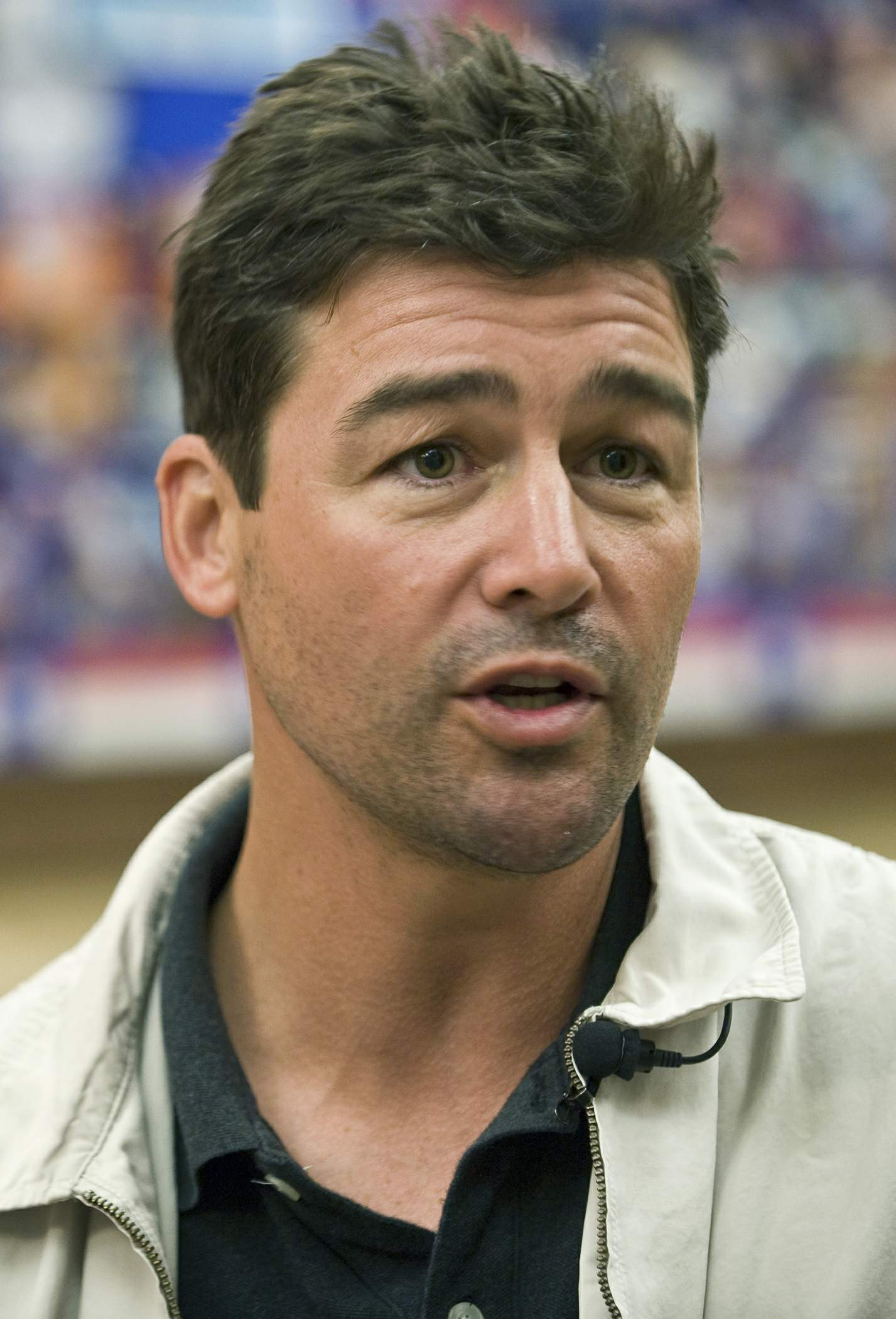
(Left to right) Joel Courtney (pictured in 2018), Elle Fanning (2020), and Kyle Chandler (2009)
- Joel Courtney as Joseph "Joe" Francis Lamb, a 14-year-old boy grieving the death of his mother
- Elle Fanning as Alice Dainard
- Riley Griffiths as Charles Kaznyk
- Ryan Lee as Cary McCarthy
- Gabriel Basso as Martin Read
- Zach Mills as Preston Scott
- Kyle Chandler as Deputy Jack Lamb, a local Ohio sheriff, widower, and Joe's father
- Ron Eldard as Louis Dainard, Alice's alcoholic father whom Jack blames for his wife's death.
- AJ Michalka as Jen Kaznyk
- Joel McKinnon Miller as Mr. Kaznyk
- Jessica Tuck as Mrs. Kaznyk
- Brett Rice as Sheriff Pruitt
- Michael Giacchino as Deputy Crawford
- Michael Hitchcock as Deputy Rosko
- Jay Scully as Deputy Skadden
- Noah Emmerich as Colonel Nelec, a ruthless, military leader of an elite Air Force unit obsessed with killing the Alien
- Richard T. Jones as Overmyer
- Bruce Greenwood as The Alien (credited as Cooper), the creature who escapes military captivity and goes on a rampage, all while trying to go back to his home planet.
- David Gallagher as Donny
- Glynn Turman as Dr. Thomas Woodward, Joe's biology teacher and a former Area 51 doctor who originally had a connection with the Alien
- Beau Knapp as Breen
- Dan Castellaneta as Izzy
- Caitriona Balfe as Elizabeth Lamb, Joe's deceased mother
- Dale Dickey as Edie

== Production ==
=== Development ===
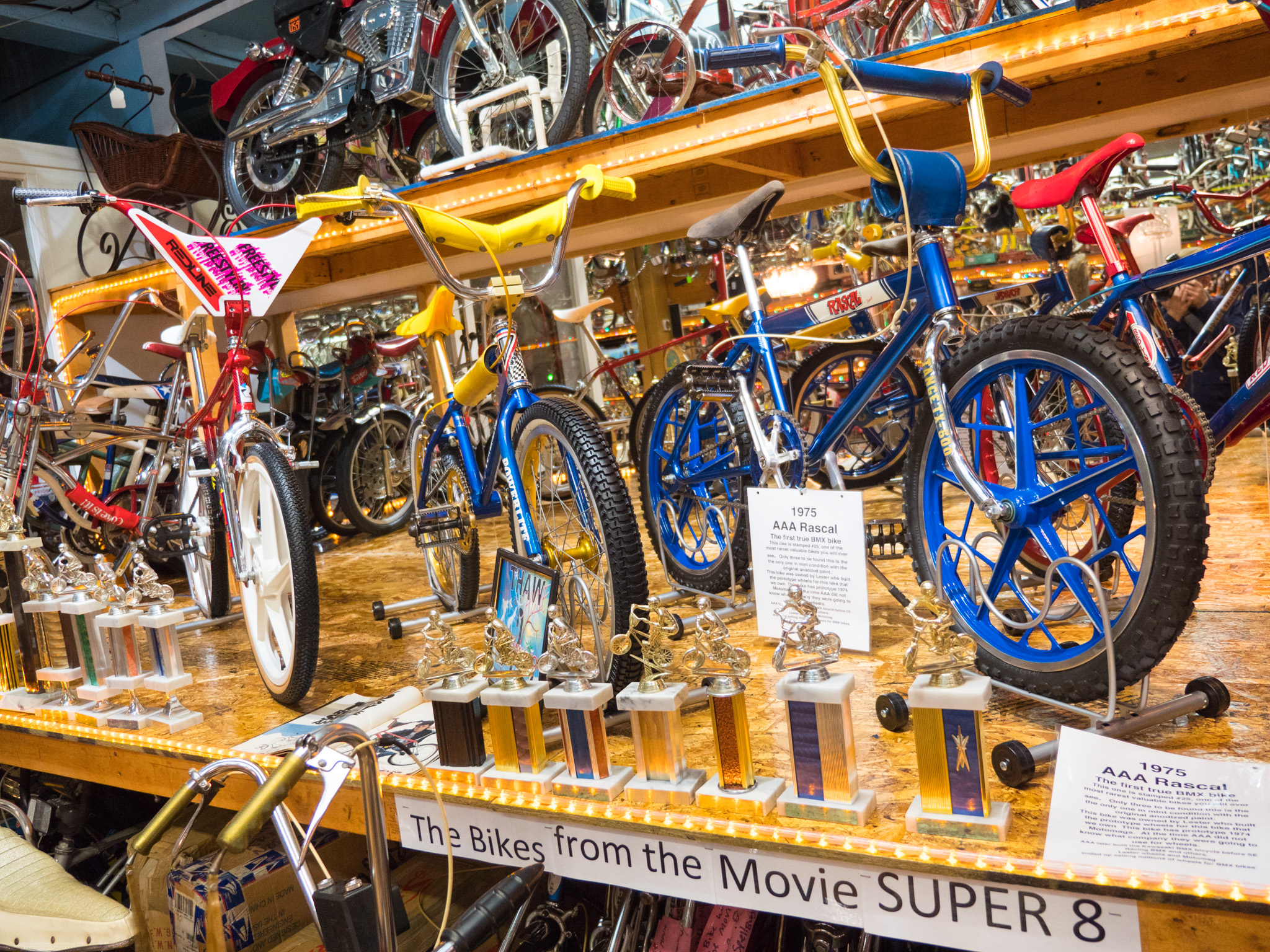
Bicycles used in the movie Super 8 on display at Bicycle Heaven

J.J. Abrams initially conceived Super 8 by combining two distinct ideas: one about kids making a movie during the 1970s, and another focused on a large-scale alien invasion. The concept began when Abrams thought of a scene featuring a factory's "Accident-Free" sign, which later grew into a more complex storyline. He ultimately decided to combine the two ideas, feeling that the "kids' movie" concept alone might not draw enough attention from audiences.

Abrams collaborated with Steven Spielberg and others to develop the plot. Despite early speculation that Super 8 was connected to Abrams' 2008 film Cloverfield, he quickly denied the rumor, clarifying that Super 8 was its own standalone project. Primary filming for the movie began in the fall of 2010, while the teaser trailer had been shot separately in April of that year. Super 8 became the first original J. J. Abrams project produced by Amblin Entertainment, Bad Robot, and Paramount Pictures.

To cast the film's lead roles, Abrams held a national talent search to find fresh faces for the young characters. Joel Courtney, who had initially auditioned for a commercial, was chosen because Abrams saw something "different" in him. Riley Griffiths secured his role by submitting a self-taped audition.

Jason James, who worked as a casting assistant on this and multiple other films featuring child characters, was subsequently revealed to be a convicted child molester named Jason James Murphy. Abrams said he was unaware of Jason's true identity and that "To think that someone like this was among us is unthinkable."

=== Filming ===
Filming for Super 8 took place in Weirton, West Virginia, from September 20 to December 16, 2010. To help promote the film, Valve Corporation created a short video game segment, which was included alongside certain versions of Portal 2.

Initially, director J.J. Abrams intended to shoot all the footage for the fictional movie within the film, "The Case", on the titular Super-8 film stock. However, this plan was abandoned due to challenges faced by Industrial Light and Magic, who found it difficult to integrate CGI into the grainy Super-8 footage. As a result, cinematographer Larry Fong opted to use Super-16 film for scenes that required visual effects, ensuring smoother CGI integration while maintaining a similar aesthetic.

== Music ==
The score for the film was composed by Michael Giacchino (who played Deputy Crawford in the film), Abrams' long-time collaborator, conducted by Tim Simonec and performed by the Hollywood Studio Symphony. The soundtrack was released on June 13, 2011, by Varèse Sarabande. It won the 2012 Saturn Award for Best Music.

During the ending credits, the songs "Don't Bring Me Down" by Electric Light Orchestra and "My Sharona" by the Knack are featured. The Blondie song "Heart of Glass" and the Cars song "Bye Bye Love" are also featured in the film.

== Marketing ==
Like Cloverfield (2008), an earlier J. J. Abrams-produced film, Super 8 used an elaborate viral marketing campaign to generate interest. The first teaser trailer, attached to Iron Man 2 in May 2010, showed a freight train transporting contents from a decommissioned section of Area 51. A dramatic crash leads to the release of a mysterious entity, captured on a Super 8 camera. A hidden message was discovered, reading "Scariest Thing I Ever Saw", which was embedded in the trailer's final frames. This clue led them to the website www.scariestthingieversaw.com, simulating an old PDP-11 computer system, with clues revealing that the computer belonged to Josh Woodward, son of Dr. Woodward, a key figure in the story.

As part of the viral marketing campaign, a website for Rocket Poppeteers (a fictional brand like Slusho in Cloverfield) was launched, unrelated to the events of the film. The official Super 8 website featured an "editing room" section that invited users to collect clips from across the internet and stitch them together. Once assembled, the footage depicted the alien's ship disintegrating into white cubes and Dr. Woodward's encounter with the alien.

Additionally, the video game Portal 2 features an interactive trailer that allows players to experience an interactive version of the first teaser trailer.

== Release ==
The film was released on June 9, 2011, in Australia; June 10, 2011, in the United States; and August 5, 2011, in the United Kingdom. On June 8, Paramount also launched a "Super 8 Sneak Peek" Twitter promotion, offering a chance to purchase tickets for an advance screening, taking place on June 9, 2011, in the United States.

=== Home media ===
Super 8 was released on Blu-ray and DVD on November 22, 2011. The release was produced as a combo pack with a digital copy, including nine bonus features and fourteen deleted scenes. A 4K Blu-Ray edition was released for its tenth anniversary (May 25, 2021).

== Reception ==
=== Box office ===
Super 8 had a production budget of $50 million. It was commercially released on June 10, 2011. In the United States and Canada, it opened in 3,379 theaters and grossed over $35.4 million on its opening weekend, ranking first at the box office. The film grossed $127 million in North America with a worldwide total of some $260 million.

=== Critical response ===
On the review aggregator Rotten Tomatoes, Super 8 holds an approval rating of 81% based on 296 reviews, with an average rating of 7.3/10. The site's consensus reads: "It may evoke memories of classic summer blockbusters a little too eagerly for some, but Super 8 has thrills, visual dazzle, and emotional depth to spare." Metacritic assigned the film a weighted average score of 72 out of 100 based on 41 critics, indicating "generally favorable reviews". Audiences polled by CinemaScore gave it a "B+" on an A+ to F scale.

Chris Sosa of Gather gave the film an A rating, describing it as "a gripping and exciting tale of finding one's place in the world amidst tragedy." He praised the film's emotionally resonant storytelling, concluding that, "While the genre-bending occasionally unsettles, the film's genuine and emotionally gripping nature makes its journey believable."

Critics offered varying opinions, with Roger Ebert awarding the film 3.5 stars out of 4, praising it as a "nostalgic" tribute to earlier styles of filmmaking, where "audiences were told a story and not pounded over the head with aggressive action." Similarly, Richard Corliss of Time called it "the year's most thrilling, feeling mainstream movie," placing it among his Top 10 Best Movies of 2011. Jamie Graham of Total Film gave it a 5-star review, noting that Abrams' storytelling ability makes him "a born storyteller".

That said, the film's ending drew polarized reactions. Some praised its emotional resonance, while others found it rushed and lacking. For instance, Fernando F. Croce of MUBI criticized the film for starting strong but ending poorly. Moreover, the frequent homages to Steven Spielberg's early works drew mixed feedback; David Edelstein of New York Magazine referred to it as a "flagrant crib" of Spielberg's films, albeit one made with "the blessing of the master".

=== Accolades ===
List of awards and nominations
Award	Category	Recipient(s)	Result
4th Annual Coming of Age Awards	Best Newcomer	Joel Courtney	Won
4th Annual Coming of Age Awards	Best Cinematography	Larry Fong	Won
4th Annual Coming of Age Awards	Special Soundtrack		Won
Central Ohio Film Critics Association	Best Picture		Nominated
SFX Awards	Best Film		Nominated
SFX Awards	Best Director	J. J. Abrams	Nominated
10th Annual TSR Awards	Actress of the Year (Multiple Roles)	Elle Fanning	Nominated
10th Annual TSR Awards	Best Visuals: Special Effects		Nominated
38th Saturn Awards	Best Science Fiction Film		Nominated
38th Saturn Awards	Best Performance by a Younger Actor	Joel Courtney	Won
38th Saturn Awards	Best Performance by a Younger Actor	Elle Fanning	Nominated
38th Saturn Awards	Best Director	J. J. Abrams	Won
38th Saturn Awards	Best Writing	J. J. Abrams	Nominated
38th Saturn Awards	Best Music	Michael Giacchino	Won
38th Saturn Awards	Best Editing	Maryann Brandon and Mary Jo Markey	Nominated
38th Saturn Awards	Best Special Effects		Nominated
48th Annual CAS Awards	Best Sound Mixing		Nominated
2011 BAM Awards	Best Picture		Nominated
2011 BAM Awards	Best Director	J. J. Abrams	Nominated
2011 BAM Awards	Best Cinematography	Larry Fong	Nominated
2011 BAM Awards	Best Makeup		Nominated
2011 BAM Awards	Best Original Screenplay	J. J. Abrams	Won
2011 BAM Awards	Best Editing	Maryann Brandon and Mary Jo Markey	Nominated
2011 BAM Awards	Best Score	Michael Giacchino	Won
2011 BAM Awards	Best Sound Editing/Mixing		Won
2011 BAM Awards	Best Visual Effects		Nominated
2011 BAM Awards	Best Costumes		Nominated
2011 BAM Awards	Best Cast		Nominated
2011 BAM Awards	Best Youth Ensemble		Nominated
2011 BAM Awards	Best Performance by a Child Actress in a Leading Role	Elle Fanning	Won
2011 BAM Awards	Best Performance by a Child Actor in a Leading Role	Joel Courtney	Won
2011 BAM Awards	Best Performance by a Child Actor in a Supporting Role	Ryan Lee	Won
2011 BAM Awards	Best Young Actor/Actress	Elle Fanning	Nominated
17th Empire Awards	Best Sci-Fi/Fantasy		Nominated
17th Empire Awards	Best Female Newcomer	Elle Fanning	Nominated
2011 St. Louis Film Critics Association Awards	Best Visual Effects		Nominated
2011 Phoenix Film Critics Society Awards	Best Editing	Maryann Brandon and Mary Jo Markey	Nominated
2011 Phoenix Film Critics Society Awards	Best Ensemble Acting		Won
2011 Phoenix Film Critics Society Awards	Best Film		Nominated
2011 Phoenix Film Critics Society Awards	Best Original Score	Michael Giacchino	Nominated
2011 Phoenix Film Critics Society Awards	Best Youth Performance — Male	Joel Courtney	Nominated
2011 Phoenix Film Critics Society Awards	Best Youth Performance — Female	Elle Fanning	Nominated
2011 Phoenix Film Critics Society Awards	Breakthrough Performance — On Camera	Elle Fanning	Nominated
2011 Satellite Awards	Best Supporting Actress	Elle Fanning	Nominated
2011 Satellite Awards	Best Original Score	Michael Giacchino	Nominated
2011 Satellite Awards	Best Visual Effects	Dennis Muren, Kim Libreri, Paul Kavanagh, Russell Earl	Nominated
2011 Satellite Awards	Best Sound (Editing & Mixing)	Andy Nelson, Anna Behlmer, Ben Burtt, Mark Ulano, Matthew Wood, and Tom Johnson	Nominated
2011 Scream Awards
2011 Scream Awards	The Ultimate Scream		Nominated
2011 Scream Awards	Best Science Fiction Movie		Won
2011 Scream Awards	Best Director	J. J. Abrams	Nominated
2011 Scream Awards	Best Scream-Play	J. J. Abrams	Won
2011 Scream Awards	Breakout Performance — Female	Elle Fanning	Nominated
2011 Scream Awards	Holy Sh!t Scene Of The Year	The Train Crash	Nominated
2011 Teen Choice Awards
2011 Teen Choice Awards	Choice Movie: Sci-Fi/Fantasy		Nominated
2011 Teen Choice Awards	Choice Movie Actress: Sci-Fi/Fantasy	Elle Fanning	Nominated
2011 Teen Choice Awards	Choice Male Breakout Star	Joel Courtney	Nominated
2011 Teen Choice Awards	Choice Movie: Male Scene Stealer	Riley Griffiths	Nominated
2011 Teen Choice Awards	Choice Movie: Chemistry	Gabriel Basso, Joel Courtney, Elle Fanning, Riley Griffiths, Ryan Lee, Zach Mills	Nominated
2011 Teen Choice Awards	Choice Hissy Fit	Bruce Greenwood	Nominated
2012 Broadcast Film Critics Association Awards
2012 Broadcast Film Critics Association Awards	Best Action Movie		Nominated
2012 Broadcast Film Critics Association Awards	Best Sound		Nominated
2012 Broadcast Film Critics Association Awards	Best Visual Effects		Nominated
2012 Broadcast Film Critics Association Awards	Best Young Actor/Actress	Elle Fanning	Nominated
Golden Reel Awards	Music in a Feature Film		Nominated
Golden Reel Awards	Dialogue and ADR for Feature Film	Ben Burtt, Matthew Wood, Steve Slanec, Cheryl Nardi, Richard Quinn, Stuart McCowan, Brad Semenoff, Gwendolyn Yates Whittle	Won
Golden Reel Awards	Sound Effects and Foley in a Feature Film		Nominated
Hollywood Film Festival	Spotlight Award	Elle Fanning	Won
YouReviewer Awards	Best Supporting Actress	Elle Fanning	Nominated
YouReviewer Awards	Best Visual Effects		Nominated
YouReviewer Awards	Breakthrough Actor	Joel Courtney	Nominated
33rd Young Artist Awards	Best Performance in a Feature Film - Leading Young Actor	Joel Courtney	Nominated
33rd Young Artist Awards	Best Performance in a Feature Film - Leading Young Actress	Elle Fanning	Nominated
33rd Young Artist Awards	Best Performance in a Feature Film — Supporting Young Actor	Zach Mills	Nominated
33rd Young Artist Awards	Best Performance in a Feature Film — Young Ensemble Cast	Joel Courtney, Elle Fanning, Ryan Lee, Zach Mills, Riley Griffiths, Gabriel Basso and Britt Flatmo	Nominated
2012 MTV Movie Awards	Breakthrough Performance	Elle Fanning	Nominated

In addition to these awards, the film was short-listed for the Academy Award for Best Visual Effects and Best Original Score, and the BAFTA Award for Best Original Screenplay, Best Sound, and Best Special Visual Effects. Paramount submitted it for several considerations for the BAFTAs including Best Film, Best Director (J. J. Abrams), Best Original Screenplay, Leading Actor (Kyle Chandler), Supporting Actress (Elle Fanning), Supporting Actor (Joel Courtney, Gabriel Basso, Noah Emmerich), Cinematography, Production Design, Editing, Costume Design, Original Music, Sound, Makeup and Hair, and Special Visual Effects.
