= Zach Mills =

American former actor (born 1995)

- Born: December 26, 1995 (age 30); Lakewood, Ohio, US
- Occupation: Actor
- Years active: 2004–2011

Zachary Mills (born December 26, 1995) is an American former child actor. He is known for his roles in the films, Hollywoodland (2006), Mr. Magorium's Wonder Emporium (2007), Kit Kittredge: An American Girl (2008), and Super 8 (2011).

== Personal life ==
Zach was born in Lakewood, Ohio to Kerry and Patrick Mills. His father is from Cleveland, and his mother is from New York, which is where Zach performed his first professional acting job at the age of 8. Zach has two older half-brothers who do not act.

== Career ==
Mills began his acting career in a Cingular commercial. Mills has appeared in multiple film and television productions from 2004 to 2011. These include a brief appearance in the television series Scrubs and guest starring roles in such shows as Malcolm in the Middle, Eleventh Hour, Numb3rs, Ghost Whisperer and October Road. His first significant supporting role in a film was as Adrien Brody's son in the 2006 film, Hollywoodland. In 2007 he appeared in the Hallmark movie The Valley of Light, and that year would also mark his leading role in Mr. Magorium's Wonder Emporium, in which he acted alongside Dustin Hoffman and Natalie Portman. In 2008 he appeared in a leading role in the film Kit Kittredge: An American Girl, and a supporting role as a news vendor in the Clint Eastwood-directed Changeling. In 2011, Zach played "Preston" in J. J. Abrams's Super 8, as well as "Lucas Morganstern" in the Hub miniseries Clue.

== Filmography ==
Year	Title	Role	Notes
2004	Dreams of an Angel	Tyke	
2006	Hollywoodland	Evan Simo	
2006	The Santa Clause 3: The Escape Clause	Carpenter Elf	
2007	The Valley of Light	Matthew	Nominated — Young Artist Award for Best Performance in a TV Movie, Miniseries or Special – Supporting Young Actor
2007	Steam	TJ	
2007	Mr. Magorium's Wonder Emporium	Eric Applebaum	Nominated — Young Artist Award for Best Performance in a Feature Film – Leading Young Actor
2008	Kit Kittredge: An American Girl	Stirling Howard	Nominated — Young Artist Award for Best Performance in a Feature Film – Supporting Young Actor; Young Artist Award for Best Performance in a Feature Film – Young Ensemble Cast
2008	Changeling	News Vendor	
2009	Single White Millionaire	Sam	
2009	Raspberry Magic	Zachary Dunlap	
2011	Super 8	Preston Scott	Nominated — Young Artist Award for Best Performance in a Feature Film - Supporting Young Actor; Nominated — Young Artist Award for Best Performance in a Feature Film – Young Ensemble Cast

== Television ==
Year	Title	Role	Notes
2005	Ghost Whisperer	Ernest Stutter	
2005	Cold Case	Taylor	Episode: "Start Up"
2006	Numb3rs	Pete Kinkirk	Season 3, Episode 5: "Traffic"
2006	Malcolm in the Middle	Park Bench Kid	Episode: "Stevie in the Hospital"
2007	Rules of Engagement	Judd	Episode: "Old School Jeff"
2008	October Road	Young Nick Garrett	Episode: "Stand Alone by Me"
2011	Clue	Lucas Morganstern	

== Awards ==
2008 Young Artist Award
Best Performance in a Feature Film – Leading Young Actor for Mr. Magorium's Wonder Emporium — Nominated
Best Performance in a TV Movie, Miniseries or Special – Supporting Young Actor for The Valley of Light — Nominated
2009 Young Artist Award
Best Performance in a Feature Film – Supporting Young Actor for Kit Kittredge: An American Girl — Nominated
Best Performance in a Feature Film – Young Ensemble Cast for Kit Kittredge: An American Girl — Won
2012 Young Artist Award
Best Performance in a Feature Film - Supporting Young Actor for Super 8 - Nominated
