= Ryan Lee (actor) =

American actor

- Born: Ryan Scott Lee; Austin, Texas, U.S.
- Other name: Ryan S. Lee
- Citizenship: United States; United Kingdom
- Occupation: Actor
- Years active: 2006–present

Ryan Scott Lee is an American–British actor. He is best known for his role as Warren in the show Trophy Wife and as Cary in the 2011 film Super 8. He also co-starred in the film Goosebumps as Champ, in the show My Dead Ex on go90, as well as appearing in the music video for David Guetta's "Titanium".

== Early life ==
Lee was born in Austin, Texas, to a family of Christian background. He relocated to the United Kingdom and gained British citizenship, when he was 22. He attended the Canyon Vista Middle School.

== Career ==
In 2011, Lee played Cary in the film Super 8, and in the same year he starred in the music video for David Guetta's song "Titanium" (featuring Sia). In the following year he played the student Joseph in Judd Apatow's This Is 40. In 2015, he also co-starred in the film Goosebumps as Champ.

== Filmography ==
=== Film ===
Year	Title	Role	Notes
2007	Trick or Treat	Young Patrick	Short film
2007	Prank Call		Short film
2008	Deadland Dreaming	Fountain Kid	Short film
2008	Kings of the Evening	Beggar	
2008	A Birthday Story	Ralph	Short film
2008	Color by Number	Adam	Short film
2008	Red Wednesday	Schoolboy	Short film
2008	Murphy's Bluff	Young Boy	Short film
2009	Shorts	Classmate	
2009	Weight of the World	Francis	Short film
2009	From the Sky	Best Friend	Short film
2009	Balls Out: Gary the Tennis Coach	Mourner / Tennis Fan	
2009	Lya	The Pig Troll	Short film
2009	Play Land	Birthday Boy	Short film
2009	Lambs	Samuel	Short film
2010	Titans	Volodia	
2010	Moloch's Lullaby	Anton	Short film
2010	Make a Wish	Braden Anderson	Short film
2011	The Legend of Hell's Gate: An American Conspiracy	Jeral Floyd	
2011	Super 8	Cary McCarthy	
2012	This Is 40	Joseph	
2012	Weight of the Word	Frances	Short film
2012	Meeting Evil	Scooter	Credited as Ryan Scott Lee
2013	White Rabbit	Steve	
2014	A Merry Friggin' Christmas	Rance	
2014	Yellowbird	Anton (voice)	English dub
2015	Goosebumps	Champ	
2017	All Summers End	Timmy	
2017	Speech & Debate	Mark	
2018	Instant Family	Ryan	
2018	Rooftops		Short film
2021	Black Friday!	Chris	

=== Television ===
Year	Title	Role	Notes
2006	Friday Night Lights	Jake Dunn	Episode: "It's Different for Girls"
2009	Breaking Bad	Neighbor's Kid	Episode: "Seven Thirty-Seven"
2010	My Generation	Vincent Barbuso	Episode: "Home Movies"
2012	Watsky's Making an Album	Deadly Kelly	1 episode
2012	Isabel	Tim	Television film
2012	Game Shop	The Kid	1 episode
2012	Sketchy	Fale	Episode: "Hungry Games"
2012	Community	Joshua	Episode: "The First Chang Dynasty"
2012	Good Luck Charlie	Logan	Episode: "Guys & Dolls"
2012	R.L. Stine's The Haunting Hour	Shawn	Episode: "My Imaginary Friend"
2013	Workaholics	Shane	Episode: "High Art"
2014	How I Met Your Dad	Justin	Unaired pilot
2013–2014	Trophy Wife	Warren	Main role
2017	Dimension 404	Andrew Myers	Episode: "Polybius"
2017	Brockmire	John Elton	Recurring role; 5 episodes
2017	The Son	James Greenhorn	Episodes: "Death Song" and "Scalps"
2018	My Dead Ex	Ben	Main role
2020	That One Time	Larry Williams	Main role

=== Music videos ===
Year	Artist	Song	Role
2011	David Guetta	Titanium	Protagonist

== Awards and nominations ==
Year	Work	Award	Category	Result	Ref.
2011	Super 8	2011 BAM Awards	Best Performance by a Child Actor in a Supporting Role	Won	
2012	Super 8	Young Artist Award	Best Performance in a Feature Film - Young Ensemble Cast	Nominated	
