= Riley Griffiths =

American football player d actor (born 1997)

- Born: May 14, 1997 (age 29); Cedar City, Utah, U.S.
- Occupations: Actor; football player
- Years active: 2010–2011
- Parents: Anne (mother); Brandon (father)
- Relatives: Jade Griffiths (brother)

Riley Griffiths (born May 14, 1997) is an American former actor and former college football player, perhaps best known for his role as Charles Kaznyk in the 2011 film, Super 8.

== Early life and education ==
Griffiths was born on May 14, 1997, in Cedar City, Utah. His first acting role came when he was 6 years old, when he participated in a version of William Shakespeare's A Midsummer Night's Dream.

Griffiths' family later moved to the Issaquah/Sammamish area. While attending Skyline High School, Griffiths played as a defensive lineman for the varsity football team. He also played defensive line while attending Montana State University.

== Career ==
In 2010, Griffiths got his first major role, when he was selected to play the role of Charles Kaznyk, in Super 8, written and directed by J. J. Abrams and produced by Steven Spielberg. While attending Montana State University, Griffiths was a defensive linemen for the Bobcats’ football team. He has expressed interest in working behind the scenes on film.

== Filmography ==
=== Film ===
Year	Title	Role
2011	Super 8	Charles Kaznyk

=== Television ===
Year	Title	Role	Note(s)
2011	R.L. Stine's The Haunting Hour	Willie	Episode: "Mascot"

== Awards and nominations ==
Year	Award	Category	Work	Result
2011	PFCS Award	Best Ensemble Acting	Super 8	Won
2011	Teen Choice Award	Choice Movie Male Scene Stealer	Super 8	Nominated
2011	Teen Choice Award	Choice Movie Chemistry	Super 8	Nominated
2012	Young Artist Award	Best Performance in a Feature Film: Young Ensemble Cast	Super 8	Nominated
