= HPA Award for Outstanding Editing – Feature Film =

Annual award given by the Hollywood Professional Association

The Hollywood Professional Association Award for Outstanding Editing in a Feature Film is an annual award given by the Hollywood Professional Association (HPA) to post production workers in the film and television industry, in this case film editors. It was first awarded in 2008, and has been presented every year since.

== Winners and nominees ==
- † – indicates the winner of the Academy Award for Best Film Editing.
- ‡ – indicates a nomination for the Academy Award for Best Film Editing.

=== 2000s ===
| Year | Program | Nominees |
|---|---|---|
2008
| 2008 | The Dark Knight ‡ | Lee Smith |
| 2008 | Into the Wild ‡ | Jay Cassidy |
| 2008 | Iron Man | Dan Lebental |
2009
| 2009 | Slumdog Millionaire † | Chris Dickens |
| 2009 | The Hurt Locker † | Chris Innis and Bob Murawski |
| 2009 | Star Trek | Maryann Brandon and Mary Jo Markey |

=== 2010s ===
| Year | Program | Nominees |
|---|---|---|
2010
| 2010 | Inception | Lee Smith |
| 2010 | Avatar ‡ | John Refoua, Stephen E. Rivkin, and James Cameron |
| 2010 | The Blind Side | Mark Livolsi |
| 2010 | Invictus | Joel Cox and Gary D. Roach |
| 2010 | Toy Story 3 | Ken Schretzmann and Lee Unkrich |
2011
| 2011 | The Social Network † | Kirk Baxter and Angus Wall |
| 2011 | Black Swan ‡ | Andrew Weisblum |
| 2011 | Cars 2 | Stephen Schaffer |
| 2011 | Super 8 | Maryann Brandon and Mary Jo Markey |
| 2011 | X-Men: First Class | Eddie Hamilton and Lee Smith |
2012
| 2012 | Hugo ‡ | Thelma Schoonmaker |
| 2012 | The Artist ‡ | Anne-Sophie Bion and Michel Hazanavicius |
| 2012 | The Avengers | Jeffrey Ford and Lisa Lassek |
| 2012 | The Dark Knight Rises | Lee Smith |
| 2012 | The Girl with the Dragon Tattoo † | Kirk Baxter and Angus Wall |
2013
| 2013 | Argo † | William Goldenberg |
| 2013 | Flight | Jeremiah O'Driscoll |
| 2013 | Les Misérables | Melanie Oliver and Chris Dickens |
| 2013 | Star Trek Into Darkness | Maryann Brandon and Mary Jo Markey |
| 2013 | Zero Dark Thirty ‡ | Dylan Tichenor and William Goldenberg |
2014
| 2014 | Captain Phillips ‡ | Christopher Rouse |
| 2014 | 12 Years a Slave ‡ | Joe Walker |
| 2014 | American Hustle ‡ | Jay Cassidy, Crispin Struthers, and Alan Baumgarten |
| 2014 | Captain America: The Winter Soldier | Jeffrey Ford and Matthew Schmidt |
| 2014 | Guardians of the Galaxy | Fred Raskin, Craig Wood, and Hughes Winborne |
2015
| 2015 | Whiplash † | Tom Cross |
| 2015 | American Sniper ‡ | Joel Cox and Gary D. Roach |
| 2015 | The Imitation Game ‡ | William Goldenberg |
| 2015 | Interstellar | Lee Smith |
| 2015 | Selma | Spencer Averick |
2016
| 2016 | The Big Short ‡ | Hank Corwin |
| 2016 | The Martian | Pietro Scalia |
| 2016 | The Revenant ‡ | Stephen Mirrione |
| 2016 | Sicario | Joe Walker |
| 2016 | Spotlight ‡ | Tom McArdle |
2017
| 2017 | Dunkirk † | Lee Smith |
| 2017 | Get Out | Gregory Plotkin |
| 2017 | Hidden Figures | Peter Teschner |
| 2017 | The Ivory Game | Verena Schönauer |
| 2017 | Lion | Alexandre de Franceschi |
2018
| 2018 | A Quiet Place | Christopher Tellefsen |
| 2018 | Believer | Demian Fenton |
| 2018 | Coco | Steve Bloom |
| 2018 | Mission: Impossible – Fallout | Eddie Hamilton |
| 2018 | You Were Never Really Here | Joe Bini |
2019
| 2019 | Once Upon a Time in Hollywood | Fred Raskin |
| 2019 | Green Book ‡ | Patrick J. Don Vito |
| 2019 | The Other Side of the Wind | Orson Welles and Bob Murawski |
| 2019 | Rolling Thunder Revue: A Bob Dylan Story by Martin Scorsese | Damian Rodriguez and David Tedeschi |
| 2019 | A Star Is Born | Jay Cassidy |

=== 2020s ===
| Year | Program | Nominees |
|---|---|---|
2020
| 2020 | Parasite ‡ | Yang Jin-mo |
| 2020 | Joker ‡ | Jeff Groth |
| 2020 | Ford v Ferrari † | Michael McCusker and Andrew Buckland |
| 2020 | Jojo Rabbit ‡ | Tom Eagles |
| 2020 | The Two Popes | Fernando Stutz |
2021
| 2021 | Sound of Metal † | Mikkel E. G. Nielsen |
| 2021 | The Father ‡ | Yorgos Lamprinos |
| 2021 | Minari | Harry Yoon |
| 2021 | Soul | Kevin Nolting |
| 2021 | The Trial of the Chicago 7 ‡ | Alan Baumgarten |
| 2022 | Outstanding Editing – Theatrical Feature | |
| 2022 | Tick, Tick... Boom! ‡ | Myron Kerstein and Andrew Weisblum |
| 2022 | Belfast | Úna Ní Dhonghaíle |
| 2022 | No Time to Die | Elliot Graham and Tom Cross |
| 2022 | Top Gun: Maverick ‡ | Eddie Hamilton |
| 2022 | Encanto | Jeremy Milton |
| 2022 | Outstanding Editing – Documentary/Nonfiction – Theatrical Feature | |
| 2022 | Summer of Soul | Joshua L. Pearson |
| 2022 | Navalny | Maya Hawke and Langdon Page |
| 2022 | The Janes | Kristen Huntley |
| 2022 | Flee | Janus Billeskov Jansen |
| 2022 | Lucy and Desi | Robert A. Martinez |
| 2022 | How to Survive a Pandemic | Tyler H. Walk and Adam Evans |
| 2023 | Outstanding Editing – Theatrical Feature | |
| 2023 | Oppenheimer † | Jennifer Lame |
| 2023 | Barbie | Nick Houy |
| 2023 | Mission: Impossible – Dead Reckoning Part One | Eddie Hamilton |
| 2023 | Spider-Man: Across the Spider-Verse | Michael Andrews |
| 2023 | Tár ‡ | Monika Willi |
