= Saturn Award for Best Editing =

Award for editing

- Awarded for: Best editing of the year for a genre film
- Country: United States
- Presented by: Academy of Science Fiction, Fantasy and Horror Films
- First award: 1977
- Currently held by: Michael P. Shawver for Sinners (2024/2025)
- Website: www.saturnawards.org

The Saturn Award for Best Editing (originally Saturn Award for Outstanding Editing) is one of the annual awards given by the Academy of Science Fiction, Fantasy and Horror Films. The Saturn Awards, which are the oldest film-specialized awards to honor science fiction, fantasy, and horror in film (the Hugo Award for Best Dramatic Presentation is the oldest award for science fiction and fantasy films), included the category for the first time at the 5th Saturn Awards.

The award was discontinued after being awarded again at the following ceremony, but was reactivated for the 38th ceremony in 2012. Paul Hirsch, who won the inaugural award for Star Wars (1977), sharing the award with Marcia Lucas and Richard Chew, won it again thirty-four years later for Mission: Impossible – Ghost Protocol (2011); he is currently the only editor to have won it twice.

== Winners and nominees ==
=== 1970s ===
Year	Editors	Film
1977 (5th)	Paul Hirsch, Marcia Lucas, and Richard Chew (Juried)	Star Wars
1978 (6th)	Joe Dante and Mark Goldblatt (Juried)	Piranha

=== 2010s ===
Year	Editor(s)	Film
2011 (38th)	Paul Hirsch	Mission: Impossible – Ghost Protocol
2011 (38th)	Maryann Brandon and Mary Jo Markey	Super 8
2011 (38th)	Mark Day	Harry Potter and the Deathly Hallows – Part 2
2011 (38th)	Michael Kahn	The Adventures of Tintin
2011 (38th)	Thelma Schoonmaker	Hugo
2011 (38th)	Christian Wagner, Fred Raskin, and Kelly Matsumoto	Fast Five
2012 (39th)	Alexander Berner	Cloud Atlas
2012 (39th)	Stuart Baird and Kate Baird	Skyfall
2012 (39th)	Bob Ducsay	Looper
2012 (39th)	Jeffrey Ford and Lisa Lassek	The Avengers
2012 (39th)	John Gilroy	The Bourne Legacy
2012 (39th)	Tim Squyres	Life of Pi
2013 (40th)	Alfonso Cuarón and Mark Sanger	Gravity
2013 (40th)	Peter Amundson and John Gilroy	Pacific Rim
2013 (40th)	Alan Edward Bell	The Hunger Games: Catching Fire
2013 (40th)	Mark Day	About Time
2013 (40th)	Daniel P. Hanley and Mike Hill	Rush
2013 (40th)	Christian Wagner, Kelly Matsumoto, and Dylan Highsmith	Fast & Furious 6
2014 (41st)	James Herbert and Laura Jennings	Edge of Tomorrow
2014 (41st)	Jeffrey Ford and Matthew Schmidt	Captain America: The Winter Soldier
2014 (41st)	William Goldenberg and Tim Squyres	Unbroken
2014 (41st)	John Ottman	X-Men: Days of Future Past
2014 (41st)	Fred Raskin, Hughes Winborne, and Craig Wood	Guardians of the Galaxy
2014 (41st)	Lee Smith	Interstellar
2015 (42nd)	Maryann Brandon and Mary Jo Markey	Star Wars: The Force Awakens
2015 (42nd)	Eddie Hamilton and Jon Harris	Kingsman: The Secret Service
2015 (42nd)	Dan Lebental and Colby Parker Jr.	Ant-Man
2015 (42nd)	Margaret Sixel	Mad Max: Fury Road
2015 (42nd)	Kevin Stitt	Jurassic World
2015 (42nd)	Christian Wagner, Dylan Highsmith, Kirk Morri, and Leigh Folsom Boyd	Furious 7
2016 (43rd)	Michael Kahn	The BFG
2016 (43rd)	Jeffrey Ford and Matthew Schmidt	Captain America: Civil War
2016 (43rd)	John Gilroy, Colin Goudie, and Jabez Olssen	Rogue One: A Star Wars Story
2016 (43rd)	Stefan Grube	10 Cloverfield Lane
2016 (43rd)	Mark Livolsi	The Jungle Book
2016 (43rd)	Joe Walker	Arrival
2017 (44th)	Bob Ducsay	Star Wars: The Last Jedi
2017 (44th)	Debbie Berman and Michael P. Shawver	Black Panther
2017 (44th)	Michael McCusker and Dirk Westervelt	Logan
2017 (44th)	Gregory Plotkin	Get Out
2017 (44th)	Paul Rubell and Christian Wagner	The Fate of the Furious
2017 (44th)	Sidney Wolinsky	The Shape of Water
2018/2019 (45th)	Jeffrey Ford and Matthew Schmidt	Avengers: Endgame
2018/2019 (45th)	James Herbert	Aladdin
2018/2019 (45th)	Nicholas Monsour	Us
2018/2019 (45th)	Kirk Morri	Aquaman
2018/2019 (45th)	Evan Schiff	John Wick: Chapter 3 – Parabellum
2018/2019 (45th)	Christopher Tellefsen	A Quiet Place
2019/2020 (46th)	Bob Ducsay	Knives Out
2019/2020 (46th)	Maryann Brandon and Stefan Grube	Star Wars: The Rise of Skywalker
2019/2020 (46th)	Mike Flanagan	Doctor Sleep
2019/2020 (46th)	Yang Jin-mo	Parasite
2019/2020 (46th)	Jennifer Lame	Tenet
2019/2020 (46th)	Fred Raskin	Once Upon a Time in Hollywood

=== 2020s ===
Year	Editor(s)	Film
2021/2022 (50th)	Eddie Hamilton	Top Gun: Maverick
2021/2022 (50th)	Jeffrey Ford and Leigh Folsom Boyd	Spider-Man: No Way Home
2021/2022 (50th)	William Hoy and Tyler Nelson	The Batman
2021/2022 (50th)	Cam McLauchlin	Nightmare Alley
2021/2022 (50th)	Nicholas Monsour	Nope
2021/2022 (50th)	Paul Rogers	Everything Everywhere All at Once
2021/2022 (50th)	Pietro Scalia, Doug Brandt, and Calvin Wimmer	Ambulance
2022/2023 (51st)	Jennifer Lame	Oppenheimer
2022/2023 (51st)	Stephen Rivkin, David Brenner, John Refoua, and James Cameron	Avatar: The Way of Water
2022/2023 (51st)	Dylan Highsmith, Kelly Matsumoto, Corbin Mehl, and Laura Yanovich	Fast X
2022/2023 (51st)	Andrew Buckland, Michael McCusker, and Dirk Westervelt	Indiana Jones and the Dial of Destiny
2022/2023 (51st)	Nathan Orloff	John Wick: Chapter 4
2022/2023 (51st)	Eddie Hamilton	Mission: Impossible – Dead Reckoning Part One
2023/2024 (52nd)	Dean Zimmerman and Shane Reid	Deadpool & Wolverine
2023/2024 (52nd)	Jay Prychidny	Beetlejuice Beetlejuice
2023/2024 (52nd)	Jake Roberts	Civil War
2023/2024 (52nd)	Joe Walker	Dune: Part Two
2023/2024 (52nd)	Eliot Knapman and Margaret Sixel	Furiosa: A Mad Max Saga
2023/2024 (52nd)	Christopher Robin Bell	Strange Darling
2024/2025 (53rd)	Michael P. Shawver	Sinners
2024/2025 (53rd)	James Cameron, John Refoua, Stephen Rivkin, Nicolas de Toth, and Jason Gaudio	Avatar: Fire and Ash
2024/2025 (53rd)	Nona Khodai and Tim Roche	The Fantastic Four: First Steps
2024/2025 (53rd)	Evan Schiff	Frankenstein
2024/2025 (53rd)	Eddie Hamilton	Mission: Impossible − The Final Reckoning
2024/2025 (53rd)	Stefan Grube and Dave Trachtenberg	Predator: Badlands

== Multiple nominations ==
5 nominations

- Jeffrey Ford

4 nominations

- Christian Wagner

3 nominations

- Maryann Brandon
- Bob Ducsay
- John Gilroy
- Eddie Hamilton
- Dylan Highsmith
- Kelly Matsumoto
- Fred Raskin
- Matthew Schmidt

2 nominations

- Leigh Folsom Boyd
- Mark Day
- Stefan Grube
- James Herbert
- Michael Kahn
- Jennifer Lame
- Mary Jo Markey
- Michael McCusker
- Nicholas Monsour
- Kirk Morri
- Michael Shawver
- Tim Squyres
- Dirk Westervelt

== Multiple wins ==
2 wins

- Bob Ducsay
- Paul Hirsch
