= Newport Beach Film Festival =

Annual film festival in California

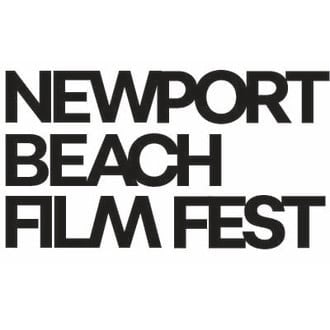
- Location: Newport Beach, California, United States
- Founded by: Gregg Schwenk
- Website: www.newportbeachfilmfest.com

The Newport Beach Film Festival (NBFF) is an annual film festival in Newport Beach, California, typically held in late April. In 2022, it was announced that the festival had permanently changed its date to be held in October, as the festival began positioning itself for Oscar season.

== History ==
Established in 1999 after the failure of an earlier film festival series in the same location, the Newport Beach Film Festival features World, North America, U.S. and West Coast premieres as well as International Spotlight Series celebrating foreign language films.

Notable attendees have included Jeannot Szwarc, Isidore Mankovsky, McG and Richard Sherman

In 2005, Will Ferrell was the honorary chair of a 'Youth Film Showcase.' In 2013, NBFF announced a new partnership with the Orange County Music Awards; which has produced the launch of the Music Video Showcase in the festival. 2013 was the first year this genre was included in the festival.

In 2014, the festival reported record attendance of about 54,000. In 2019, the festival opened with Luce and the closing night film was A Part of Water.

In 2021, the festival returned to a live format with a brunch for Variety's "10 Actors to Watch" and other honorees including Thomasin McKenzie, Regina Hall, Simon Rex, Winston Duke, Rosanna Arquette and Harvey Keitel. In 2022, the festival officially changed its date to October, and honored actors including Jonathan Majors, Keke Palmer, Colson Baker, and Aubrey Plaza.

== Awards ==
In addition to juried awards, NBFF distributes honors to distinguished members of the film industry:

=== Lifetime Achievement Award ===
Recipients include Robert Wise, Eugene Levy, Forest Whitaker Harvey Keitel, and Mark Hamill.

=== Icon Award ===
Recipients include Maryann Brandon, Mary Jo Markey, Robert Forster and Rosanna Arquette (2020).

=== Artist of Distinction ===
Recipients include Colman Domingo, Topher Grace, Mary Elizabeth Winstead, Gavin Hood, Patton Oswalt, Aubrey Plaza, Jonathan Majors and Keke Palmer.

=== Other awards ===
NBFF has distributed honors with many names over the years, some of these awards include the Breakout Performance (Jenny Slate, Thomasin McKenzie, Moe Dunford, Aimee Carerro), Maverick Award (Cooper Raiff), Rising Star and Spotlight (Simon Rex, Colson Baker, Anna Diop). The Chuck Jones Center for Creativity has presented an award to student animators at the festival for a time. In 2025, the Legend & Groundbreaker Award went to Scarlet Johansson.

=== UK Honours ===
Beginning in 2014, NBFF began honoring "British Talent" with an award ceremony held just before the BAFTA award ceremonies.

== Program ==
The Newport Beach Film Festival is divided into eight competitive sections, in which filmmakers can submit their pieces to. The film categories that are shown in this festival include:

- Action Sports Films
- AA+D (Art, Architecture and Design Film Series)
- Documentaries
- Environmental Films
- Family Films
- Music Films
- Short Films
- Youth Films

Due to the coastal location of the festival, many of the films are connected to the history of surfing, skateboarding and snowboarding. This suggests the Newport Beach Film Festivals audience base is largely dedicated to the Action Sports Cinema category.
