= Fred Raskin =

American film editor (born 1973)

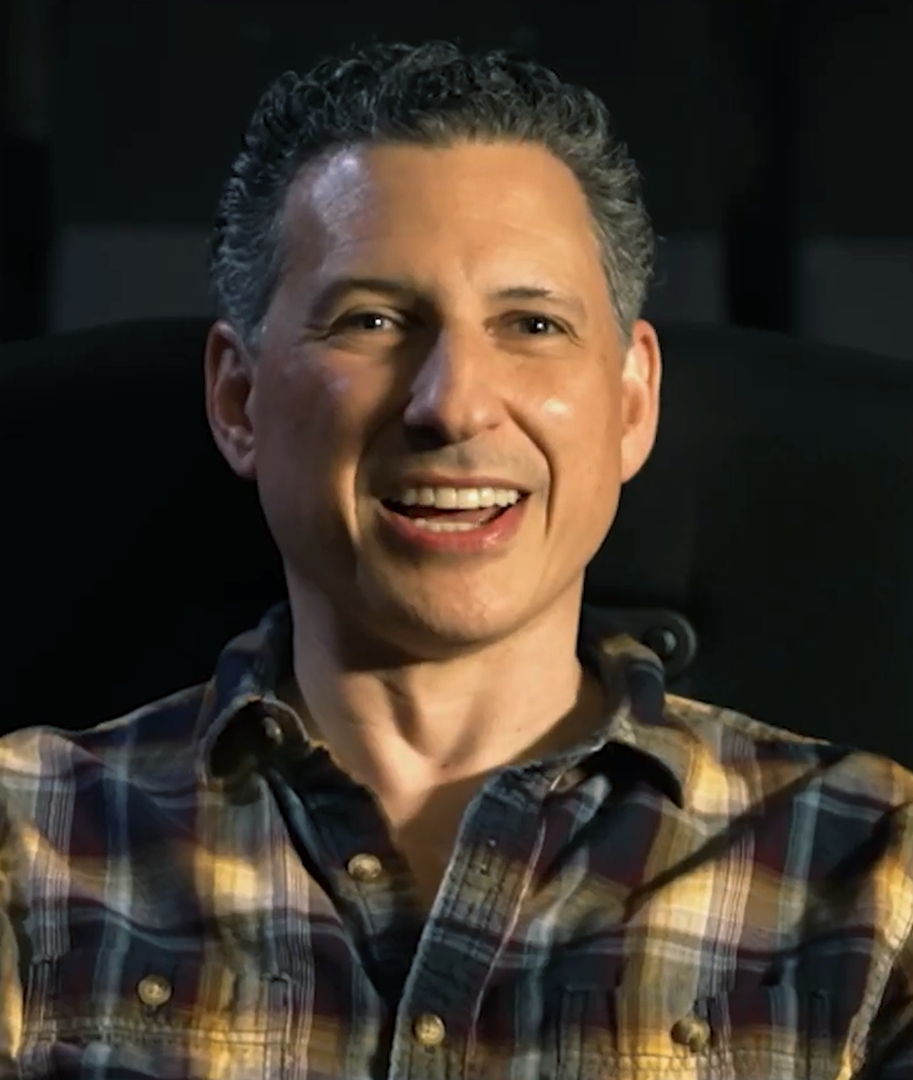
- Raskin in 2023
- Born: September 26, 1973 (age 52); Philadelphia, Pennsylvania, U.S.
- Occupation: Film editor
- Years active: 1995–present

Fred Raskin, A.C.E. (born September 26, 1973) is an American film editor.

== Career ==
Raskin is best known for editing three installments in the Fast & Furious film series, Quentin Tarantino's Django Unchained, The Hateful Eight and Once Upon a Time in Hollywood, and the Guardians of the Galaxy film trilogy. He graduated from New York University's Tisch School of the Arts (1991–1995).

In 2015, he was nominated for the ACE Eddie Award for Best Edited Feature Film (Comedy or Musical) for his editing work on Guardians of the Galaxy, along with Hughes Winborne and Craig Wood.

== Filmography ==
=== Film ===
Year	Film	Director	Notes
1995	The Fear	Vincent Robert	Apprentice film editor
1996	Hard Eight	Paul Thomas Anderson	Post-production assistant
1996	Tromeo and Juliet	Lloyd Kaufman	Apprentice editor
1996	Crossworlds	Krishna Rao	Assistant film editor
1996	Omega Doom	Albert Pyun	Assistant film editor
1997	Boogie Nights	Paul Thomas Anderson	Second assistant editor
1998	Hurlyburly	Anthony Drazan	Second assistant editor
1998	One Foot in the Grave	Kevin Ula Christie; Donald D'Amico; Carl Thibault	
2000	All the Pretty Horses	Billy Bob Thornton	First assistant editor
2001	Daddy and Them	Billy Bob Thornton	Second assistant editor
2001	Impostor	Gary Fleder	Assistant editor Uncredited
2002	Wesland	Ari Eisner	Short film
2002	Better Luck Tomorrow	Justin Lin	Additional editor
2002	Insomnia	Christopher Nolan	Assistant editor
2002	Punch-Drunk Love	Paul Thomas Anderson	Additional film editor
2003	Kill Bill: Volume 1	Quentin Tarantino	Assistant editor
2004	Kill Bill: Volume 2	Quentin Tarantino	Second assistant editor
2006	Annapolis	Justin Lin	
2006	The Fast and the Furious: Tokyo Drift	Justin Lin	With Kelly Matsumoto and Dallas Puett
2008	The Lazarus Project	John Patrick Glenn	
2009	Fast & Furious	Justin Lin	With Christian Wagner
2010	The Big Bang	Tony Krantz	
2011	Fast Five	Justin Lin	Nominated – Saturn Award for Best Editing (shared with Christian Wagner and Kelly Matsumoto)
2012	Hit and Run	David Palmer; Dax Shepard	Additional editor
2012	Django Unchained	Quentin Tarantino	Nominated – BAFTA Award for Best Editing; Nominated – Italian Online Movie Awards for Best Editing; Nominated – Gold Derby Awards for Best Editing
2014	Guardians of the Galaxy	James Gunn	Nominated – Saturn Award for Best Editing (shared with Hughes Winborne and Craig Wood)
2015	Bone Tomahawk	S. Craig Zahler	With Greg D'Auria
2015	The Hateful Eight	Quentin Tarantino	
2017	Guardians of the Galaxy Vol. 2	James Gunn	With Craig Wood
2018	The House with a Clock in Its Walls	Eli Roth	
2019	Once Upon a Time in Hollywood	Quentin Tarantino	Won – Hollywood Professional Association Awards for Best Editing; Won – Hollywood Post Alliance for Outstanding Editing – Feature Film; Won – St. Louis Film Critics Association for Best Editing; Nominated – American Cinema Editors for Best Edited Feature Film – Comedy; Nominated – Chicago Film Critics Association Awards for Best Editing; Nominated – San Diego Film Critics Society for Best Editing; Nominated – Austin Film Critics Association for Best Editing; Nominated – San Francisco Film Critics Circle for Best Editing; Nominated – Washington D.C. Area Film Critics Association for Best Editing; Nominated – Hollywood Critics Association Awards for Best Editing; Nominated – Critics' Choice Movie Awards for Best Editing; Nominated – Alliance of Women Film Journalists for Best Editing; Nominated – Central Ohio Film Critics Association for Best Editing; Nominated – Music City Film Critics' Association Awards for Best Editing; Nominated – Online Film Critics Society Awards for Best Editing; Nominated – BAFTA Award for Best Editing; Nominated – Seattle Film Critics Awards for Best Editing; Nominated – American Cinema Editors Award for Best Edited Feature Film – Comedy or Musical; Nominated – Gold Derby Awards for Best Editing
2021	The Suicide Squad	James Gunn	With Christian Wagner
2023	Guardians of the Galaxy Vol. 3	James Gunn	With Greg D'Auria
2024	Carry-On	Jaume Collet-Serra	With Elliot Greenberg and Krisztian Majdik
2025	A Working Man	David Ayer	
2026	Supergirl	Craig Gillespie	With Tatiana S. Riegel
2027	Man of Tomorrow	James Gunn	Post-production

=== Television ===
Year	Film	Director	Notes
2022	Peacemaker	TV series With Todd Busch, Greg D'Auria and Gregg Featherman; Also associate producer	
