= Matthew Schmidt =

American film editor (born 1971)

- Born: April 30, 1971 (age 55); Asmara, Ethiopian Empire (now Eritrea)
- Occupation: Film editor
- Years active: 1994–present

Matthew Schmidt (born April 30, 1971) is an American film editor, best known for working on several Marvel Cinematic Universe films, such as Captain America: The Winter Soldier (2014), Captain America: Civil War (2016), Avengers: Infinity War (2018), Avengers: Endgame (2019), Avengers: Doomsday (2026) and Avengers: Secret Wars (2027), all alongside Jeffrey Ford, Black Widow (2021), alongside Leigh Folsom Boyd, and Thor: Love and Thunder (2022), alongside Peter S. Elliot, Tim Roche and Jennifer Vecchiarello.

Schmidt first worked with Ford as an assistant editor beginning with the first Avengers film and started sharing the editing credit with Ford beginning with Captain America: The Winter Soldier. The duo edited Avengers: Infinity War and Avengers: Endgame back-to-back, which was a two-year project and meant they were cutting at the same time of shooting. More than 900 hours of film was shot between both films, making the editing process a massive undertaking. Both films rank "among the biggest box-office earners of all time." For Avengers: Endgame, the two won the Saturn Award for Best Editing.

== Filmography ==
Year	Title	Director(s)	Notes
1997	Contact	Robert Zemeckis	Assistant editor
1998	A Perfect Murder	Andrew Davis	Assistant editor
1999	The 13th Warrior	John McTiernan	Assistant editor
2000	The Adventures of Rocky and Bullwinkle	Des McAnuff	Assistant editor
2002	Collateral Damage	Andrew Davis	First assistant editor
2003	Daredevil	Mark Steven Johnson	First assistant editor
2004	I, Robot	Alex Proyas	First assistant editor
2005	Into the Blue	John Stockwell	First assistant editor
2005	The Fog	Rupert Wainwright	Additional editor
2006	The Guardian	Andrew Davis	First assistant editor
2007	Halloween	Rob Zombie	Assistant editor
2007	Amazing Journey: The Story of The Who	Murray Lerner; Paul Crowder	First assistant editor
2008	Bangkok Dangerous	Pang brothers	Assistant editor
2008	Defiance	Edward Zwick	First assistant editor
2009	John Dunn's Last Run	Ryan Dixon	Short film
2010	The Wolfman	Joe Johnston	Visual effects editor
2011	Hop	Tim Hill	Assistant editor
2011	Dragon Age: Redemption	Peter Winther	Additional editor
2012	The Avengers	Joss Whedon	Assistant editor
2013	Iron Man 3	Shane Black	First assistant editor
2014	Captain America: The Winter Soldier	Russo brothers	Co-edited with Jeffrey Ford; Nominated—Saturn Award for Best Editing; Nominated—HPA Award for Outstanding Editing – Feature Film
2015	Avengers: Age of Ultron	Joss Whedon	Associate editor
2016	The Deal	Daniel S. Kaminsky	Short film
2016	Captain America: Civil War	Russo brothers	Co-edited with Jeffrey Ford; Nominated—Saturn Award for Best Editing
2017	The Fate of the Furious	F. Gary Gray	Previs editor
2018	Avengers: Infinity War	Russo brothers	Co-edited with Jeffrey Ford; Saturn Award for Best Editing (for Avengers: Endgame)
2019	Avengers: Endgame	Russo brothers	Co-edited with Jeffrey Ford; Saturn Award for Best Editing (for Avengers: Endgame)
2021	Black Widow	Cate Shortland	Co-edited with Leigh Folsom Boyd
2022	Thor: Love and Thunder	Taika Waititi	Co-edited with Peter S. Elliot, Tim Roche, and Jennifer Vecchiarello
2025	Captain America: Brave New World	Julius Onah	Co-edited with Madeleine Gavin
2025	The Old Guard 2	Victoria Mahoney	
2026	Avengers: Doomsday	Russo brothers	Co-edited with Jeffrey Ford
2027	Avengers: Secret Wars	Russo brothers	Co-edited with Jeffrey Ford
TBA	Control	Robert Schwentke	Co-edited with Sven Budelmann
