= Hughes Winborne =

American film editor

- Born: January 3, 1952 (age 74); Raleigh, North Carolina, United States
- Occupation: Film editor
- Years active: 1980–present
- Spouse: Regina De Freitas
- Children: Wyatt Winborne

Hughes Winborne is a Hollywood film editor. He has edited 20 films, including Crash, for which he won an Oscar for film editing in the 78th Academy Awards. He also edited Sling Blade (1996) and The Pursuit of Happyness (2006), though his true passion resides in Indie features.

Hughes graduated from the University of North Carolina at Chapel Hill in 1975 (with a bachelor's degree in history). After working for several years, he enrolled in a film program at New York University and discovered film editing.

Winborne has been elected as a member of the American Cinema Editors.

== Selected filmography ==
| Year | Title | Notes |
|---|---|---|
| 1988 | Plagues | Television film |
| 1991 | Contact: The Yanomami Indians of Brazil | |
| 1992 | The Bet | Short film |
| 1994 | The Last Good Time | |
| 1995 | Drunks | |
| 1995 | Low | |
| 1995 | Comfortably Numb | |
| 1996 | All She Ever Wanted | Television film |
| 1996 | Sling Blade | |
| 1996 | Her Desperate Choice | Television film |
| 1998 | Curtain Call | |
| 1999 | A Slipping-Down Life | |
| 1999 | Buddy Boy | |
| 2000 | Waterproof | |
| 2001 | Nobody's Baby | |
| 2001 | Walter and Henry | Television film |
| 2001 | Wild Iris | Television film |
| 2002 | Stark Raving Mad | |
| 2004 | Employee of the Month | |
| 2004 | Crash | Academy Award for Best Film Editing; ACE Eddie for Best Edited Feature Film - Dramatic; Nominated — BAFTA Award for Best Editing; Nominated — Gold Derby Award for Best Editing |
| 2006 | Even Money | |
| 2006 | The Pursuit of Happyness | |
| 2007 | The Great Debaters | |
| 2008 | Seven Pounds | |
| 2010 | Teen Patti | |
| 2010 | 180º | |
| 2011 | The Help | |
| 2012 | Item 47 | Short film; with John Breinholt |
| 2012 | The Motel Life | |
| 2013 | Charlie Countryman | |
| 2014 | Guardians of the Galaxy | With Fred Raskin and Craig Wood; Nominated — ACE Eddie for Best Edited Feature Film – Comedy or Musical; Nominated — HPA Award for Outstanding Editing - Feature Film; Nominated — Saturn Award for Best Editing |
| 2015 | Pixels | |
| 2016 | Fences | |
| 2016 | All I See is You | |
| 2019 | Noelle | |
| 2021 | A Journal for Jordan | |
