= Eddie Hamilton =

British film editor

- Occupation: Film editor
- Years active: 1993–present

Eddie Hamilton is a British film editor. He is a member of the American Cinema Editors. He is a frequent collaborator of film directors Matthew Vaughn and Christopher McQuarrie.

After his collaboration with actor Tom Cruise on the Mission Impossible film series, Cruise recommended him to film director Joseph Kosinski that he edit their 2022 film Top Gun: Maverick. For his work on the film, he was nominated for numerous year-end awards, including the Academy Award and BAFTA Award.

== Selected filmography ==
Year	Title	Director	Notes
1993	Hallraiser III: Hell On Commie (student film)	Simon Fitzjohn & Eddie Hamilton	
1998	Urban Ghost Story	Geneviève Jolliffe	
2000	Dead Babies	William Marsh	
2001	Mr In-Between	Paul Sarossy	
2001	Large	Justin Edgar	
2001	Mean Machine	Barry Skolnick	
2002	Club Le Monde	Simon Rumley	
2002	Swept Away	Guy Ritchie	
2003	Crime Spree	Brad Mirman	
2004	Resident Evil: Apocalypse	Alexander Witt	
2004	Spivs	Colin Teague	
2005	Shadows in the Sun	Brad Mirman	
2006	Minotaur	Jonathan English	
2006	DOA: Dead or Alive	Corey Yuen	
2008	Freebird	Jon Ivay	
2010	Kick-Ass	Matthew Vaughn	
2011	X-Men: First Class	Matthew Vaughn	
2011	Swinging with the Finkels	Jonathan Newman	
2011	Foster	Jonathan Newman	
2013	Jadoo	Amit Gupta	
2013	All Things to All Men	George Isaac	
2013	Kick-Ass 2	Jeff Wadlow	
2014	The Loft	Erik Van Looy	
2014	Kingsman: The Secret Service	Matthew Vaughn	Nominated (with John Harris)—Saturn Award for Best Editing
2015	Mission: Impossible – Rogue Nation	Christopher McQuarrie	
2017	Kingsman: The Golden Circle	Matthew Vaughn	
2018	Mission: Impossible – Fallout	Christopher McQuarrie	Seattle Film Critics Society Award for Best Film Editing
2022	Top Gun: Maverick	Joseph Kosinski	American Cinema Editors Award for Best Edited Feature Film – Dramatic; Saturn Award for Best Editing; Washington D.C. Area Film Critics Association Award for Best Editing; Capri Hollywood International Film Festival Award for Best Editing; Nominated—Academy Award for Best Film Editing; Nominated—BAFTA Award for Best Editing; Nominated—Critics' Choice Movie Award for Best Editing; Nominated—Hollywood Critics Association Creative Arts Award for Best Editing; Nominated—Austin Film Critics Association Award for Best Film Editing; Nominated—Hollywood Professional Association Award for Outstanding Editing; Nominated-Satellite Award for Best Editing; Nominated—Seattle Film Critics Society Award for Best Film Editing; Nominated—St. Louis Film Critics Association Award for Best Editing; Nominated—Alliance of Women Film Journalists Award for Best Editing; Nominated—San Francisco Bay Area Film Critics Circle Award for Best Film Editing; Nominated—Online Film Critics Society Award for Best Editing
2023	Mission: Impossible – Dead Reckoning Part One	Christopher McQuarrie	
2025	Mission: Impossible – The Final Reckoning	Christopher McQuarrie	
