= Craig Wood (film editor) =

Australian film editor

Craig Wood is an Australian film editor working in America.

== Early life ==
Wood was born in Sydney.

== Career ==
Wood began his career at the age of 19 as an assistant editor in the Australian Broadcasting Corporation's documentary department before moving into music video and advertising work.

He has worked as an editor on almost all of director Gore Verbinski’s films, including the 1996 short film The Ritual, as well as on over a dozen Verbinski-directed commercials, including the Clio Awards and Silver Lion-winning Budweiser "Frogs" (1995).

== Selected filmography ==
=== Film ===
Year	Title	Director	Notes
1989	Spirits of the Air, Gremlins of the Clouds	Alex Proyas	—N/a
1994	The Crow	Alex Proyas	Additional editor
1997	Mouse Hunt	Gore Verbinski	—N/a
1999	Forces of Nature	Bronwen Hughes	—N/a
2001	The Mexican	Gore Verbinski	—N/a
2002	We Were Soldiers	Randall Wallace	Additional film editor
2002	Highway	James Cox	—N/a
2002	The Ring	Gore Verbinski	—N/a
2003	Pirates of the Caribbean: The Curse of the Black Pearl	Gore Verbinski	Co-edited with Arthur Schmidt and Stephen Rivkin; ACE Eddie for Best Edited Feature Film - Comedy or Musical
2005	The Weather Man	Gore Verbinski	—N/a
2006	Pirates of the Caribbean: Dead Man's Chest	Gore Verbinski	Co-edited with Stephen Rivkin; Nominated — Best Edited Feature Film - Comedy or Musical
2007	Pirates of the Caribbean: At World's End	Gore Verbinski	Co-edited with Stephen Rivkin; Nominated — ACE Eddie for Best Edited Feature Film - Comedy or Musical
2008	Never Back Down	Jeff Wadlow	Additional editor
2008	The Burning Plain	Guillermo Arriaga	—N/a
2009	The Road	John Hillcoat	Additional editor
2011	Rango	Gore Verbinski	ACE Eddie for Best Edited Animated Feature Film; Annie Award for Best Editing in a Feature Production
2013	The Lone Ranger	Gore Verbinski	Co-edited with James Haygood
2014	Cut Bank	Matt Shakman	Co-edited with Carol Littleton (uncredited)
2014	Guardians of the Galaxy	James Gunn	Co-edited with Fred Raskin and Hughes Winborne; Nominated — Saturn Award for Best Editing; Nominated — ACE Eddie for Best Edited Feature Film - Comedy or Musical; Nominated — HPA Awards for Outstanding Editing - Feature Film
2015	Tomorrowland	Brad Bird	Co-edited with Walter Murch
2016	The Great Wall	Zhang Yimou	Co-edited with Mary Jo Markey
2016	A Cure for Wellness	Gore Verbinski	Additional editor
2017	Guardians of the Galaxy Vol. 2	James Gunn	Co-edited with Fred Raskin
2018	Ant-Man and the Wasp	Peyton Reed	Co-edited with Dan Lebental
2019	Maleficent: Mistress of Evil	Joachim Rønning	Co-edited with Laura Jennings
2021	Eternals	Chloé Zhao	Co-edited with Dylan Tichenor
2024	Kraven the Hunter	J.C. Chandor	Co-edited with Chris Lebenzon
2025	Good Luck, Have Fun, Don't Die	Gore Verbinski	—N/a

=== Music videos ===
- Alphaville "Mysteries of Love" (1990) (directed by Alex Proyas)
- The Smashing Pumpkins "Today" (1993) (directed by Stéphane Sednaoui)
- Björk "Big Time Sensuality" (1993) (directed by Stéphane Sednaoui)
- Tom Petty and the Heartbreakers "Mary Jane's Last Dance" (1993) (directed by Keir McFarlane)
- UB40 "Bring Me Your Cup" (1993) (directed by Keir McFarlane)
- Janet Jackson "Any Time, Any Place" (1994) (directed by Keir McFarlane)
- Kylie Minogue "Put Yourself in My Place" (1994) (directed by Keir McFarlane)
- Monster Magnet "Negasonic Teenage Warhead" (1995) (directed by Gore Verbinski)
- Kylie Minogue "Where Is the Feeling?" (1995) (directed by Keir McFarlane)
- Tina Turner "Whatever You Want" (1996) (directed by Stéphane Sednaoui)
- Janet Jackson "Twenty Foreplay" (1996) (directed by Keir McFarlane)
- Garbage "Milk" (1996) (directed by Stéphane Sednaoui)
- Fiona Apple "Sleep to Dream" (1997) (directed by Stéphane Sednaoui)

== See also ==
- American Cinema Editors awards 2007
