= Captain America: The Winter Soldier =

2014 Marvel Studios film

- Theatrical release poster
- Directed by: Anthony Russo; Joe Russo
- Screenplay by: Christopher Markus; Stephen McFeely
- Based on: Captain America by: Joe Simon; Jack Kirby
- Produced by: Kevin Feige
- Starring: Chris Evans; Scarlett Johansson; Sebastian Stan; Anthony Mackie; Cobie Smulders; Frank Grillo; Emily VanCamp; Hayley Atwell; Toby Jones; Jenny Agutter; Robert Redford; Samuel L. Jackson
- Cinematography: Trent Opaloch
- Edited by: Jeffrey Ford; Matthew Schmidt
- Music by: Henry Jackman
- Production company: Marvel Studios
- Distributed by: Walt Disney Studios Motion Pictures
- Release dates: March 13, 2014 (El Capitan Theatre); April 4, 2014 (United States)
- Running time: 136 minutes
- Country: United States
- Language: English
- Budget: $170–177 million
- Box office: $714.4 million

Captain America: The Winter Soldier is a 2014 American superhero film based on the Marvel Comics character Captain America, produced by Marvel Studios and distributed by Walt Disney Studios Motion Pictures. It is the sequel to Captain America: The First Avenger (2011) and the ninth film in the Marvel Cinematic Universe (MCU). The film was directed by Anthony and Joe Russo from a screenplay by Christopher Markus and Stephen McFeely. It stars Chris Evans as Steve Rogers / Captain America alongside Scarlett Johansson, Sebastian Stan, Anthony Mackie, Cobie Smulders, Frank Grillo, Emily VanCamp, Hayley Atwell, Toby Jones, Jenny Agutter, Robert Redford, and Samuel L. Jackson. In the film, Rogers, Natasha Romanoff (Johansson), and Sam Wilson (Mackie) uncover a conspiracy within the spy agency S.H.I.E.L.D. while facing the Winter Soldier (Stan), a mysterious assassin.

Markus and McFeely began writing the sequel around the release of The First Avenger in July 2011. The script draws from the Winter Soldier story arc in the comic books written by Ed Brubaker, as well as conspiracy fiction from the 1970s such as the film Three Days of the Condor (1975). The Winter Soldier explores S.H.I.E.L.D. in a similar way to how the first film explored the U.S. military, after Rogers was shown working for S.H.I.E.L.D. in the MCU crossover film The Avengers (2012). The Russo brothers signed on to direct in June 2012 and casting began the following month. They wanted the film to be a political thriller that focused on topical ideas such as drone warfare, targeted killing, and global surveillance. Filming began in April 2013 in Los Angeles, California, before moving to Washington, D.C., and Cleveland, Ohio. Though the directors prioritized practical effects and intense stunt work to differentiate from previous Captain America portrayals, visual effects were created by six companies for 2,500 shots including the climactic Helicarrier sequence.

Captain America: The Winter Soldier premiered at the El Capitan Theatre in Hollywood, Los Angeles, on March 13, 2014, and was released in the United States on April 4, as part of Phase Two of the MCU. The film received positive reviews from critics, with praise for the performances, action sequences, storyline, and themes. It grossed $714 million worldwide, making it the seventh-highest-grossing film of 2014, and received several accolades including a nomination for best visual effects at the 87th Academy Awards. A sequel titled Captain America: Civil War, also directed by the Russos, was released in 2016.

== Plot ==
Two years after the Battle of New York, (Note: As depicted in the film The Avengers (2012)) Steve Rogers works in Washington, D.C., for the espionage agency S.H.I.E.L.D., while adjusting to contemporary society. While running laps around the Lincoln Memorial Reflecting Pool and Tidal Basin, Rogers meets and befriends Sam Wilson, a VA counselor and former USAF pararescueman. Rogers is then sent with Agent Natasha Romanoff and S.H.I.E.L.D.'s counter-terrorism team S.T.R.I.K.E., led by Agent Brock Rumlow, to free hostages aboard a S.H.I.E.L.D. vessel from pirates led by Georges Batroc. During the mission, Rogers learns that Romanoff has a secret assignment from S.H.I.E.L.D. Director Nick Fury to extract data from the ship's computers.

At the Triskelion, S.H.I.E.L.D.'s headquarters, Rogers confronts Fury and is briefed about Project Insight: three Helicarriers linked to spy satellites, designed to preemptively eliminate threats. Unable to decrypt Romanoff's data, Fury becomes suspicious about Insight and asks senior S.H.I.E.L.D. official Alexander Pierce to delay the project. On his way to rendezvous with Agent Maria Hill, Fury is ambushed by assailants led by an assassin called the Winter Soldier. Escaping to Rogers's apartment, Fury warns him that S.H.I.E.L.D. is compromised. He is shot by the Winter Soldier before handing Rogers a flash drive of the ship's data and tells him to trust no one. Fury is later pronounced dead during surgery.

Pierce questions Rogers about Fury, but Rogers refuses to answer. He is branded a fugitive, escapes from S.T.R.I.K.E., and is joined by Romanoff. They use the flash drive to find a secret S.H.I.E.L.D. bunker in New Jersey, where they activate a supercomputer containing the preserved consciousness of Arnim Zola. Zola explains that after being captured by Rogers during World War II, he was recruited to S.H.I.E.L.D. and helped to secretly reform Hydra within its ranks. Over the decades, Hydra convinced the world to trade freedom for security and used the Winter Soldier to cover their tracks. Rogers and Romanoff narrowly escape a S.H.I.E.L.D. missile that destroys the bunker, and realize that Pierce is Hydra's leader within S.H.I.E.L.D.

Rogers and Romanoff seek refuge at Sam Wilson's home, whom they discover uses a powered "Falcon" wingpack. The trio captures S.H.I.E.L.D. agent Jasper Sitwell, a Hydra mole, and force him to divulge that Zola developed a data mining algorithm that can identify current or future threats to Hydra. The Insight Helicarriers would sweep the globe using satellite-directed guns to eliminate these threats. Sitwell is killed in an ambush by the Winter Soldier, whom Rogers recognizes as his presumed-dead best friend Bucky Barnes. Barnes survived due to Zola's experimentation and has been repeatedly brainwashed and cryogenically frozen to perform Hydra's missions. Hill extracts Rogers, Romanoff, and Wilson to a safehouse where Fury, who faked his death, plans to sabotage the Helicarriers by replacing their control chips.

After World Security Council members arrive at the Triskelion for the Insight launch, Rogers broadcasts Hydra's plot to the building. Romanoff, disguised as one of the Council members, disarms Pierce. Fury arrives and forces Pierce to unlock S.H.I.E.L.D.'s database so Romanoff can leak classified information, exposing Hydra to the public. Following a struggle, Fury fatally shoots Pierce. Rogers and Wilson raid two Helicarriers and replace the control chips, but Barnes destroys Wilson's wingpack and fights Rogers on the third. Rogers replaces the final chip, allowing Hill to take control and have the vessels destroy each other. He refuses to fight Barnes, who does not recognize Rogers but hesitates when given the chance to kill him. As the Helicarriers collide with the Triskelion, Rogers falls into the Potomac River. Rumlow, another Hydra agent, is injured in the destruction. Barnes rescues the unconscious Rogers before disappearing.

With S.H.I.E.L.D. in disarray, Romanoff appears before a Senate subcommittee to defend her and Rogers's actions. Fury, under the cover of his apparent death, pursues Hydra's remaining cells. Rogers and Wilson decide to find Barnes. In a mid-credits scene, Baron Wolfgang von Strucker and his scientists at a Hydra lab dismiss the actions of Rogers and Romanoff as they examine an energy-filled scepter (Note: Identified off-screen as the scepter used by Loki in the film The Avengers (2012)) and twin test subjects who have been given superhuman abilities: one has superhuman speed, the other has telekinetic powers. (Note: This scene was written and directed by Joss Whedon, the writer and director of the crossover film Avengers: Age of Ultron (2015). The twins were identified off-screen as Pietro and Wanda Maximoff.) In a post-credits scene, Barnes visits his own memorial at the Smithsonian Institution to learn about himself.

== Cast ==
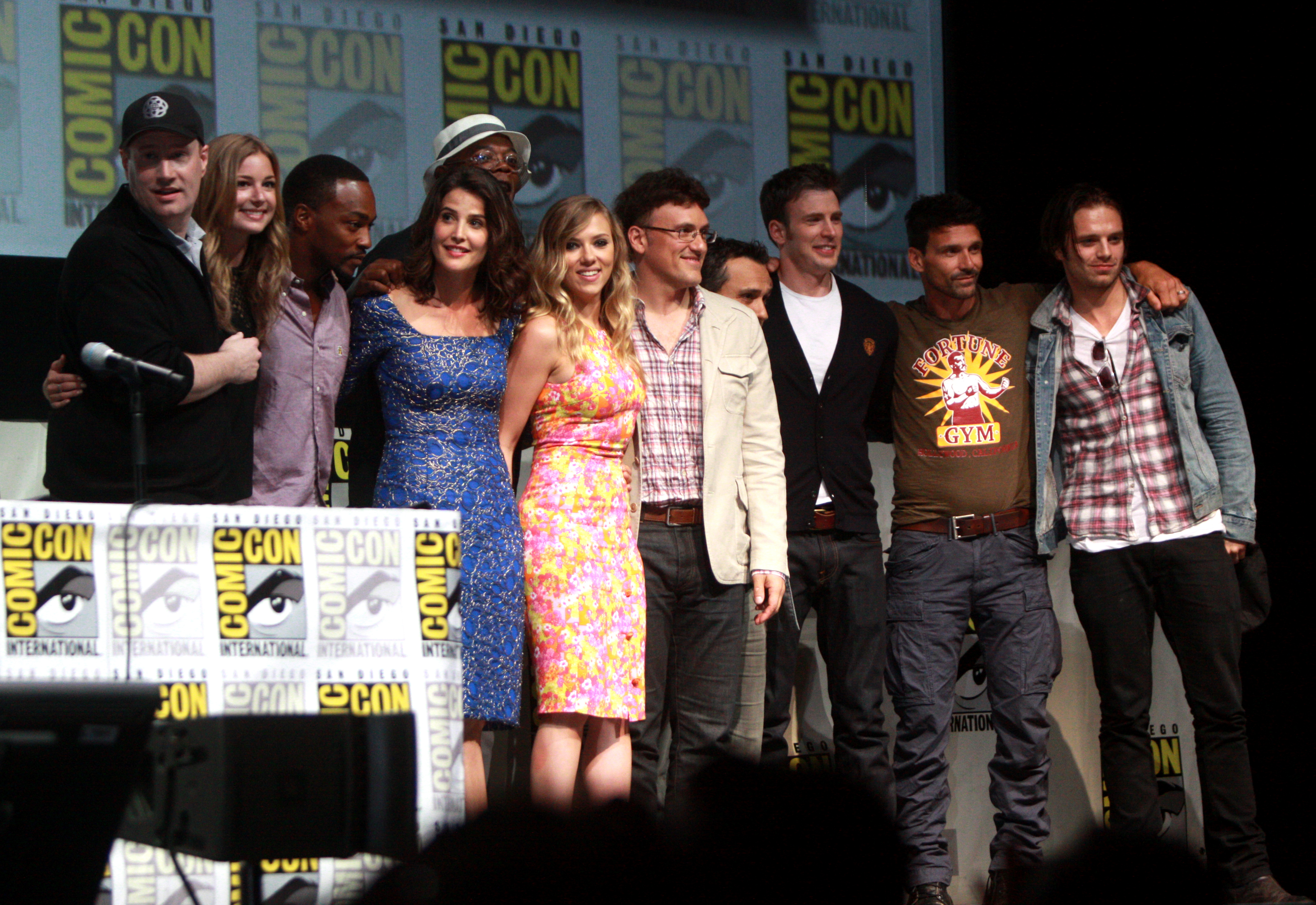
The cast and crew of Captain America: The Winter Soldier at the 2013 San Diego Comic-Con (L-R: producer Kevin Feige, VanCamp, Mackie, Smulders, Jackson, Johansson, directors Anthony and Joe Russo, Evans, Grillo, Stan)

- Chris Evans as Steve Rogers / Captain America:
  An Avenger and a World War II veteran who was enhanced to the peak of human physicality by an experimental serum, frozen in suspended animation, and is now struggling to adjust to the 21st century. Describing his character's adjustment to the modern world, Evans said, "It's not so much about his shock with [technology]... It's more about the societal differences. He's gone from the '40s to today; he comes from a world where people were a little more trusting, the threats not as deep. Now, it's harder to tell who's right and wrong. Actions you take to protect people from threats could compromise liberties and privacy. That's tough for Steve to swallow." Evans trained in "parkour, Brazilian jiu-jitsu, karate, and boxing", as the Russo brothers believed that Rogers being brought to the present "also meant that he had studied and mastered modern fighting styles and techniques". The filmmakers also looked to make the character's shield, which has traditionally been used for defense, a more offensive weapon.
- Scarlett Johansson as Natasha Romanoff / Black Widow:
  An Avenger and a highly trained spy and assassin working for S.H.I.E.L.D. who teams up with Rogers. Screenwriter Christopher Markus said that Black Widow was a "great contrast" to Captain America, describing her as "incredibly modern, not very reverent, and just very straightforward whereas Steve is, you know a man from the '40s. He's not a boy scout, but he is reserved and has a moral center, whereas her moral center moves." The Russos added, "She's a character who lies for a living. That's what she does. He's a character who tells the truth. Give them a problem and they'll have different ways of approaching it. She's pushing him to modernize, and he's pushing her to add a certain level of integrity to her life." When asked about Romanoff's relationship with Rogers, Johansson responded, "By a series of unfortunate encounters, they will be in a situation in which their friendship becomes more intimate. They share many similarities because they live on the defensive without relying on anyone. Also, the two have been working for the government throughout their professional careers. With their friendship they begin to question what they want and what is their true identity."
- Sebastian Stan as Bucky Barnes / Winter Soldier:
  Steve Rogers' childhood best friend who has re-emerged as an enhanced brainwashed assassin after supposedly being killed in action during World War II. Regarding the character, Feige said, "Winter Soldier has been methodically, almost robotically, following orders for 70 years." Stan said despite his nine-picture deal with Marvel Studios including his appearance in Captain America: The First Avenger (2011), he was not sure that Bucky would make an imminent return, and only heard the sequel's official title was "The Winter Soldier" through a friend attending San Diego Comic-Con. Stan did five months of physical training to prepare for the role and did historical research, stating, "I dove into the whole Cold War thing. I looked at the KGB. I looked at all kinds of spy movies, and all kinds of documentaries about that time, and what it was about. I grabbed anything from that time period. Anything about brainwashing." Stan also practiced daily with a plastic knife to be able to do the Winter Soldier's knife tricks without the aid of a stuntman. Regarding Bucky's transition into the Winter Soldier, Stan said, "You know, the truth of the situation is although he looks very different and there's different things about him, it still comes from the same person. I think you'll get to see that no matter what. I think part of my goal here was to make sure that you see an extension of that version but just a different color of that same version in a way. I think he's still the same guy; he's cut from the same cloth." Stan said he felt the character's introduction in The Winter Soldier was "a preview of the guy", with more aspects of the character being explored in the film's sequel Captain America: Civil War (2016).
- Anthony Mackie as Sam Wilson / Falcon:
  A former U.S. Air Force pararescueman trained by the military in aerial combat using a specially designed wing pack. About the role, Mackie said "[Wilson is] a really smart guy who went through major military training and becomes a tactical leader." He also remarked, "He's the first African-American superhero. It makes me feel all the work I've done has been paying off. I have a son, nephews and nieces, and I love the idea that they can dress up as the Falcon on Halloween. They now have someone they can idolize. That's a huge honor for me." Marvel, who cast Mackie because of his "energy and sense of fun", did not let him read a script before signing on. Mackie spent five months doing two-a-day workouts and eating an 11,000-calorie-per-day diet to get into shape for the role. Commenting on Rogers' relationship with Wilson, Evans said, "Meeting Mackie's character, he used to serve, now he works at the VA counseling guys who come home with PTSD—they connect on that level. I think they're both wounded warriors who don't bleed on other people. Cap has no one to bleed on. I think Mackie knows how to handle people like that. ... Sometimes when things are bad, trusting a stranger is the way to go."
- Cobie Smulders as Maria Hill:
  A high-ranking S.H.I.E.L.D. agent who works closely with Nick Fury. Smulders said she performed some of her own stunts in the film, explaining, "I try to do my own stunts whenever I can. You're only allowed to do certain stunts. There is an amazing team of stunt people that do most of the work in this film. But, I studied a lot of tae kwon do. I also did a lot of training just with weapons because I'm not very comfortable around guns. I had to get comfortable because that's my character's thing... I like to get really physical so I feel empowered when I am on set and even though you don't see it on screen, maybe I am taking people out that you don't see off camera."
- Frank Grillo as Brock Rumlow:
  The commander of S.H.I.E.L.D.'s counter-terrorism S.T.R.I.K.E. team. Grillo hinted in a June 2014 interview about the character's return in the sequel with the alter-ego Crossbones. Grillo signed a seven-film deal.
- Emily VanCamp as Sharon Carter / Agent 13:
  A S.H.I.E.L.D. agent assigned to guard Rogers without his knowledge. About the character, VanCamp said, "I play Agent 13 / Sharon Carter which everyone knows but we don't really touch on that in this film. We're just sort of introducing her. When we first see her we realize she's living next to Captain America... they sort of have a little thing going on and as we all know in the comic books they had a love affair off and on for years. They had a very complicated relationship. It's almost as if they are planting the seeds now. Sort of leaving room to go wherever they want to go with it." Regarding her casting, Joe Russo said, "We wanted someone that Cap would have an immediate interest in. It had to be a strong-willed person, and we felt that Emily's work on Revenge (2011–2015) was a great test tube for what this character could be. She's obviously very credible with physicality, she holds the screen really well, and she even looks like the character from the books."
- Hayley Atwell as Peggy Carter:
  A retired military agent with the Strategic Scientific Reserve and co-founder of S.H.I.E.L.D. who is a former love interest of Steve Rogers. On receiving the script, Atwell realized the character "would be 96, and I would be up to the eyeballs in prosthetics". The visual effects team was not satisfied with the initial make-up used to make Atwell look older, and eventually resorted to aging her through CGI methods.
- Toby Jones as Arnim Zola: A Hydra scientist from World War II.
- Jenny Agutter as Hawley: A member of the World Security Council.
- Robert Redford as Alexander Pierce:
  A senior official within S.H.I.E.L.D., member of the World Security Council, and old comrade of Nick Fury. Redford was cast in part as an homage to his roles in 1970s thrillers such as Three Days of the Condor, and for what the directors described as "an acting legend playing a villainous role" akin to Henry Fonda in Once Upon a Time in the West (1968). As to what attracted him to the film, Redford said it interested him by being different from his usual work, and that he "wanted to experience this new form of filmmaking that's taken over where you have kind of cartoon characters brought to life through high technology".
- Samuel L. Jackson as Nick Fury:
  The director of S.H.I.E.L.D. Regarding Fury's questionable code of ethics, Jackson said, "Almost everything that comes out of Nick Fury's mouth is a lie in some sense. He has to ask, is he even lying to himself, too? He has a very good idea of what's going on but his paranoia keeps him from believing some of it." Jackson added, "You see Nick Fury the office guy, him going about the day-to-day work of S.H.I.E.L.D. and the politics as opposed to that other stuff. It's great to have him dealing with Captain America in terms of being able to speak to him soldier to soldier and try to explain to him how the world has changed in another way while he was frozen in time. Some of the people who used to be our enemies are now our allies—him trying to figure out, 'Well, how do we trust those guys?' or 'How do we trust the guys that you didn't trust who don't trust you?' And explaining to him that the black and white of good guys/bad guys has now turned into this gray area." McFeely said, "Fury represents an obstacle for Steve in some ways. They don't always agree on how S.H.I.E.L.D. ought to be used." The writers gave Fury a more prominent role in The Winter Soldier, since within a plot featuring S.H.I.E.L.D. being dismantled, Fury would "take the brunt of it". They also intended on depicting a character that had so far been depicted as a self-assured, commanding man as vulnerable, to enhance the sense of danger in the Hydra conspiracy.

Additionally, Maximiliano Hernández and Garry Shandling reprise their roles from previous MCU films as Jasper Sitwell and Senator Stern, respectively. Georges St-Pierre plays Georges Batroc, a mercenary and a master of the French form of kickboxing known as savate. Callan Mulvey plays Jack Rollins, a member of S.H.I.E.L.D.'s S.T.R.I.K.E. unit. In addition to Agutter, Chin Han, Alan Dale, and Bernard White appear as members of the World Security Council. Comedic actors Danny Pudi and DC Pierson have small roles as a S.H.I.E.L.D. technician and an Apple Store employee, respectively. Gary Sinise narrates a Captain America-themed Smithsonian Institution exhibit and Stan Lee cameos as a security guard there. Winter Soldier creator Ed Brubaker makes a cameo as a scientist working on the Winter Soldier. Co-director Joe Russo cameos as a doctor, and writers Christopher Markus and Stephen McFeely cameo as two S.H.I.E.L.D. interrogators. Thomas Kretschmann, Henry Goodman, Aaron Taylor-Johnson, and Elizabeth Olsen make uncredited appearances as Baron Wolfgang von Strucker, Dr. List, Pietro Maximoff, and Wanda Maximoff, respectively, in the mid-credits scene.

== Production ==
=== Development ===
We hired our directors on Cap because they loved our explanation that we really want to make a '70s political thriller masquerading as a big superhero movie. Just like with the first film—we got Joe Johnston because we said, "We want to do a '40s World War II movie masquerading as a big superhero movie." I love that we're doing a sequel to a film that's a completely different genre than the first film. I think that's fun. And the comics do it all the time.

— Kevin Feige, producer of Captain America: The Winter Soldier

In April 2011, prior to the release of the Marvel Cinematic Universe (MCU) film Captain America: The First Avenger in theaters that July, screenwriters Christopher Markus & Stephen McFeely announced that they were hired by Marvel Studios to begin work on the film's sequel. In September 2011, Chris Evans, who portrayed Steve Rogers / Captain America in The First Avengers, said that a sequel might not be released until 2014. In January 2012, Neal McDonough, who played Dum Dum Dugan in The First Avenger, mentioned that a sequel would likely be filmed after the completion of the MCU film Thor: The Dark World (2013), meaning sometime in 2012. By March 2012, Marvel whittled down the list of possible directors to three candidates: George Nolfi, F. Gary Gray, and the Russo brothers.

The following month, Gary Gray withdrew his name from consideration, choosing instead to direct the N.W.A biographical film Straight Outta Compton (2015). The Russos were under consideration to direct the film due to their Community (2009–2015) episode "For a Few Paintballs More", which spoofed Marvel Studios president Kevin Feige's love for the Star Wars franchise. The Russos weren't allowed to read the screenplay until their first meeting with Marvel, and the project consumed all of their time over the following two months, as they proceeded with storyboards, rewriting scenes, and creating an animatic to show what they intended to do both tonally and textually. Their efforts paid off and led to their hiring; Anthony Russo had told his wife Ann that if he wasn't selected for the job, he would rethink his career.

Walt Disney Studios announced intentions to release The First Avenger sequel on April 4, 2014. Disney said, "The second installment will pick-up where ... The Avengers (2012) leaves off, as Steve Rogers continues his affiliation with Nick Fury and S.H.I.E.L.D. and struggles to embrace his role in the modern world". Markus later elaborated, "I think S.H.I.E.L.D. is the water [Rogers is] swimming in. It's definitely a Captain America movie. You know, if the first movie was a movie about the US Army, then this is a movie about S.H.I.E.L.D... You will learn about S.H.I.E.L.D. You will learn about where it came from and where it's going and some of the cool things they have".

==== Writing ====
McFeely said the writing began around the release of The First Avenger in the middle of 2011, with him and Markus "noodling on in hopes that there would be a second one and we did a lot of just throwing stuff at the wall and seeing what stuck". The first few months of writing were a back and forth process with Marvel, but after an outline was finished, the story did not change much. They opted to set the story in the present day, and, after "experimenting with flashback elements for more period World War II stuff", decided to abandon the flashbacks as "it became unwieldy." The film would be "Cap versus the world we all live in today", while averting excessive comedy regarding the hero's time displacement, as Markus considered the Captain "the most adaptive man on the planet." The tone would be more grounded in reality despite the advanced technology to contrast the fantasy elements from both the first Captain America and The Avengers. Despite that, the comic book origins guaranteed that the film would have no verisimilitude. This still proved a challenge in the reveal of Arnim Zola, that had to be extensively rewritten to convey how "this grounded espionage paranoid thriller suddenly screeches to a halt and you switch gears really quickly with this ghost in the machine" that introduces more science fiction elements.

Markus and McFeely wanted to adapt Ed Brubaker's Winter Soldier storyline from the comics, which they described as "the tone of Cap's modern franchise", but it took the duo six months to convince themselves they could do it. In the meantime, while thinking how to progress from the war film tone of The First Avenger, the writers settled on the conspiracy genre for the screenplay, and cited the films The Parallax View (1974), Three Days of the Condor (1975), and Marathon Man (1976) as influences, feeling it better conveyed Captain America's trust issues and contrasting values in the new world he was living in, with Markus saying, "If you put that 1940s man into present day geo-politics everything is going to seem like a conspiracy. It's just going to seem dirty and underhanded and shifty, and people won't be telling the truth." Three Days of the Condor in particular was used as the main source of the script structure, following the idea that the protagonist is being chased by a threat they, along with the audience, only discover halfway through the film.

The writers felt this approach was similar to how Stan Lee reinvented Captain America in the 1960s and 1970s, with "the Captain dealing with all sorts of the same things that the country [was] dealing with—Vietnam, Watergate and all that stuff—so he gets to have opinions on that", thus making the "guy who is ostensibly from the more black and white 1940s react to this ultimately grey world that we live in." Feige described the film as a political thriller, and as the duo struggled to figure out a third act, Feige suggested that S.H.I.E.L.D. be brought down and have Captain America fight the agency. The writers thought this was a great story point, for implementing "the physical manifestation of Cap changing the world." Markus even noted how the 1970s comics had similar conspiracies. The Hydra reveal made sure to include returning characters among the undercover villains, as well as references to the comics such as Zola being kept alive as a machine. Feige later elaborated on the political thriller nature of the film saying,

In our attempt to make all of our films feel unique and feel different we found ourselves going back to things like [Three Days of the Condor]. Also the other political thrillers of the '70s: The Parallax View, All the President's Men (1976). This was a time that Cap existed in the comics. He found himself in the swinging '60s followed by the Watergate Era followed by the Reagan Era followed by where we are today. In the comics it was a hell of a journey for Steve. And we couldn't take him through those years because in our cinematic universe he was asleep. But we wanted to force him to confront that kind of moral conundrum, something with that '70s flavor. And in our film that takes the form of S.H.I.E.L.D.

Feige said that Steve Rogers would be paired with other characters from The Avengers like Natasha Romanoff / Black Widow and Nick Fury, because unlike Tony Stark and Thor, who could return to their own supporting casts, Rogers had nowhere else to go, "and it just made sense that he was the one that stayed with what remains of the Avengers at the end of the film." The writers considered including Clint Barton / Hawkeye–who was played by Jeremy Renner in the MCU film Thor (2011), as well as The Avengers–but "he didn't have enough to do and suddenly it seemed like we were giving him short shrift", leading all of his parts to be fulfilled by Black Widow, and Joe Russo added that Renner's schedule could not be worked out for him to appear. As to why Johann Schmidt / Red Skull from The First Avenger did not appear in The Winter Soldier, Joe Russo explained, "I know we have a guy in a computer, but the tone we were chasing was sort of that conspiracy thriller. And we wanted to try and ground the movie as much as we could. And Red Skull, he's a fantastical character and didn't necessarily fit for Cap 2 and especially because it was about the fall of S.H.I.E.L.D. Certainly Hydra exists and that's his legacy, but there's something interesting about the fact that his legacy outlived the skull. And they're still dealing with the demons of it, but not necessarily him." Chris McKenna, who worked with the Russo brothers on the sitcom Community (2009–2014), contributed to the script by writing jokes for the film. The inclusion of the passage "Ezekiel 25:17" on Fury's tombstone references the character Jules Winnfield from the film Pulp Fiction (1994), also played by Samuel L. Jackson.

=== Pre-production ===
It's hard to make a political film that's not topical. That's what makes a political thriller different from just a thriller. And that's what adds to the characters' paranoia and the audience's experience of that paranoia. But we're also very pop-culture-obsessed and we love topicality, so we kept pushing to [have] scenes that, fortunately or unfortunately, played out [during the time that Edward] Snowden outed the NSA. That stuff was already in the zeitgeist. We were all reading the articles that were coming out questioning drone strikes, pre-emptive strikes, civil liberties—[Barack] Obama talking about who they would kill... We wanted to put all of that into the film because it would be a contrast to [Captain America]'s greatest-generation [way of thinking].

— Anthony Russo, co-director of Captain America: The Winter Soldier

By June 2012, the Russo brothers entered negotiations to direct the sequel, and Jackson was confirmed to return as S.H.I.E.L.D. leader Nick Fury. Feige sought out the Russos after watching the genre-parodying season 2 finale of Community which Joe directed, and for the additional ideas they brought to the initial story pitch. Joe Russo detailed that since the intent was for a political thriller, "all the great political thrillers have very current issues in them that reflect the anxiety of the audience." Thus, the brothers opted to include references to drone warfare, targeted killing and global surveillance. Joe even noted how during principal photography, the issues became more topical due to the disclosure of several National Security Agency surveillance-related documents. At the 2012 San Diego Comic-Con, it was announced that the official title for the sequel was Captain America: The Winter Soldier, and that the Russo brothers would direct the film. After signing on to direct, the Russo brothers met with Ed Brubaker to learn more about where the Winter Soldier character came from, his thinking and the themes behind the character. In July 2012, Anthony Mackie entered negotiations to star as Sam Wilson / Falcon alongside Evans in the sequel. At that time, Sebastian Stan was also confirmed to be reprising his role as Bucky Barnes / Winter Soldier from The First Avenger in the film.

In September 2012, Evans said filming would begin in March 2013. He also said that Rogers' adjustment to the modern world, which was originally set to be included in The Avengers, would be better suited for The Winter Soldier. At the end of the month, The Greater Cleveland Film Commission announced that Captain America: The Winter Soldier would film in Cleveland, Ohio after the production was approved for a $9.5 million tax credit. Producer Nate Moore said that after also serving as a location in The Avengers, Cleveland's government was helpful in providing large locations for filming, which "provided production value which we probably could not have built in a backlot." McFeely joked that while writing ambitious action scenes "I did not realize a great American metropolis would say 'Sure, shut down three miles of freeway and go to town'." Portions of the film were also scheduled to be shot in California and Washington, D.C. By October, Emilia Clarke, Jessica Brown Findlay, Teresa Palmer, Imogen Poots, Alison Brie, and Mary Elizabeth Winstead were being considered for Rogers' love interest in the film, and Scarlett Johansson was brought back to reprise her role as Natasha Romanoff / Black Widow. Later in the month, Frank Grillo was testing for the role of Brock Rumlow in the film, and by the end of the month, Grillo closed a deal to portray the character and Cobie Smulders signed on to reprise her role as Maria Hill from The Avengers. Nikolaj Coster-Waldau, Josh Holloway, and Kevin Durand were also considered for the role of Rumlow.

In January 2013, Hayley Atwell, who played Peggy Carter in The First Avenger, said that she would not appear in the sequel. However, Stanley Tucci, who played Dr. Abraham Erskine in the previous film, later said that Atwell would reappear in a flashback scene. Also in January, Marvel Studios announced that the film would be released in 3D, and Anthony Mackie said filming would begin on April 1, 2013. Later that month, Toby Jones, who portrayed Arnim Zola in the first film, said that he would reprise the role in the sequel. By the end of the month, stages were being built for a shoot at Raleigh Manhattan Beach Studios in Los Angeles. In February 2013, Emily VanCamp entered negotiations to play a female lead in the film. Karen Gillan also auditioned for the role of Sharon Carter; Gillan would subsequently portray the Guardians of the Galaxy member Nebula in the MCU. By March 2013, Maximiliano Hernández was signed to reprise his role as S.H.I.E.L.D. agent Jasper Sitwell from Thor and The Avengers and Robert Redford entered in talks to join the cast, as a high-ranking member of S.H.I.E.L.D., which he later confirmed. Toward the end of March, UFC fighter Georges St-Pierre was cast as Georges Batroc in the film. Powers Boothe was asked to reprise his role as Gideon Malick from The Avengers, but was unable to due to working on the television series Nashville (2012–2018).

Captain America's uniform was altered from the ones seen in previous films, with a Kevlar-based ballistic component that would protect Captain America but at the same time function like a military uniform. Joe Russo said, "We wanted to use his Super Soldier outfit from the [Steve Rogers: Super Soldier series] as a way to represent, thematically, his place in the world of S.H.I.E.L.D. and the difference between working for S.H.I.E.L.D. and being Captain America." For the Falcon costume, the filmmakers were interested in adding more of a tactical design than was represented in the comic books, by including real-world webbing, straps and gear and stripping away the more comic book elements.

=== Filming ===
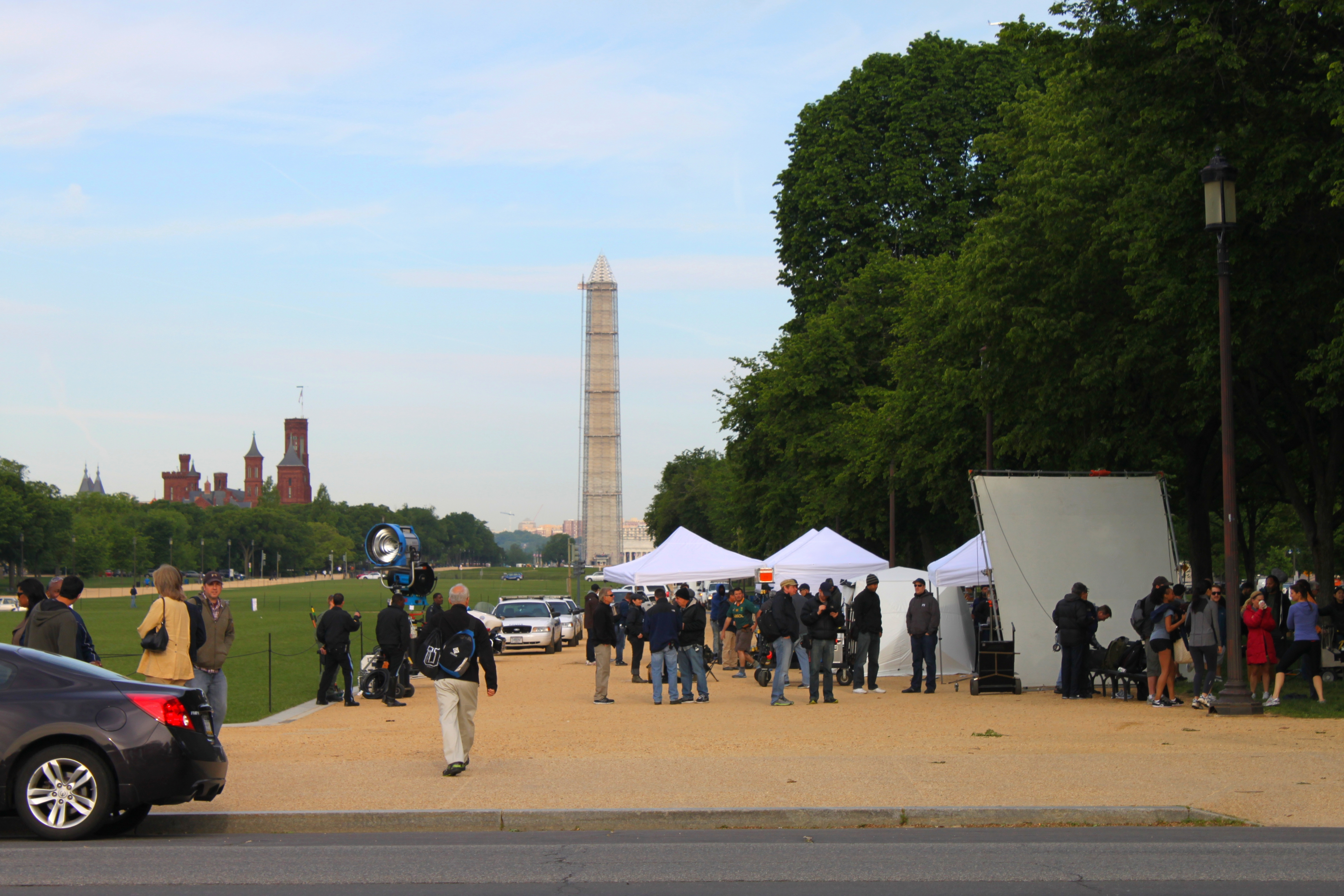
Film set for Captain America: The Winter Soldier on the National Mall

Principal photography began on April 1, 2013, at the Raleigh Manhattan Beach Studios in Los Angeles, under the working title Freezer Burn. Scenes taking place on the Lemurian Star were filmed on the Sea Launch Commander, docked in Long Beach, California. In early May, Dominic Cooper confirmed he would return to reprise his role as Howard Stark from The First Avenger in the film. On May 14, 2013, production moved to Washington, D.C., with filming taking place at the National Mall and the Theodore Roosevelt Bridge. The following day, Garry Shandling was spotted on set reprising his role of Senator Stern from the MCU film Iron Man 2 (2010). Other filming locations in Washington, D.C., included the Willard Hotel and Dupont Circle. Filming in Cleveland began on May 17 and was scheduled to last until mid-June with locations scheduled on the West Shoreway, the Southerly Wastewater Treatment Plant in Cuyahoga Heights and the Lakeview Cemetery Dam. Cleveland was chosen as a stand-in for Washington, D.C., with the city's East 6th Street doubling as 7th and D Streets in Southwest D.C. Other locations in Cleveland included the Federal Reserve Bank of Cleveland, the Cleveland Public Library, Cleveland State University, the Cleveland Arcade, Tower City Center, the Cleveland Museum of Art, and the Western Reserve Historical Society. Interior shots were also filmed inside private homes and the Pilgrim Congregational Church in Tremont. Filming in Cleveland concluded on June 27, 2013.

Trent Opaloch, best known for his work on the films District 9 (2009) and Elysium (2013), was brought in as the director of photography. Opaloch said that while attempting to emulate the 1970s thrillers that served as inspiration for the writers and directors, the staging and lighting tried to bring realism through "classic framing and naturalistic lighting", and the filming was done with hand-held cameras. To achieve this, Opaloch used Arri Alexa Plus 4:3 cameras with Panavision anamorphic lenses and Codex Digital recorders. Stunt work aimed for realistic action, prioritizing practical effects. The fight scenes were staged for months, with a choreography that aimed to highlight Captain America's superhuman qualities, and "move away from impressionistic action into specificity": the raid on the S.H.I.E.L.D. vessel had stealthiness as the Captain knocked out enemies to avert detection, and the freeway fight with Winter Soldier was more "last minute" to highlight the characters' struggle to survive. In contrast to the quick editing and moving cameras of modern action films, The Winter Soldier aimed to feature longer action scenes that felt more visceral and dangerous. The Russos mentioned the bank robbing scene of the film Heat (1995) as a major influence, which they described as "the most intense eight minutes of filmmaking I've seen in a movie theater", and action scenes directed by Brian De Palma, such as the vault heist in the film Mission: Impossible (1996) where "very likable characters are put in impossible situations that the audience is put on the edge on how they'd escape". Examples of these types of scenes include the ambushes on Nick Fury in the street and Captain America in the elevator.

=== Post-production ===
Hayley Atwell as Peggy Carter before (top) and after (bottom) she was digitally altered to appear older in the film

Editing on the film was done by the Russos on their trailer at the filming lot of Community. Additional photography was filmed in December 2013 and January 2014, for the Russos to accurately show the state of each character after the defeat of S.H.I.E.L.D., having read the script of the MCU film Avengers: Age of Ultron (2015) to guide their choices. Joss Whedon, director of The Avengers and Age of Ultron, wrote and directed the mid-credits scene, which featured Elizabeth Olsen as Wanda Maximoff, Aaron Taylor-Johnson as Pietro Maximoff, and Thomas Kretschmann as Baron Wolfgang von Strucker. The title sequences were created by design firm Sarofsky, who had worked with the Russos since Community. Sarofsky collaborated with comic book artist David W. Mack on the sequences.

Anthony Mackie said the Russo brothers relied on minimal use of computer-generated imagery, stating, "The Russos, what they did that was so great was, they wanted to stay with live action, which is a dying art form. If they can build it, they built it. If we could do it, we did it. They wanted to do as little CGI as possible. That's why the movie looks so great." Nevertheless, six special effects companies were involved in creating the visual effects of the film, including Industrial Light & Magic (ILM), Scanline VFX, Lola Visual Effects, Luma Pictures, Whiskytree and The Embassy, with previsualization completed by Proof. The film contained 2,500 visual effects shots, with 900 worked on by ILM. The film featured extensive use of digital doubles. Russell Earl, ILM visual effects supervisor, said, "The character that we did the most work on was Falcon. We knew we were going to do CG wings. We also did some shots with wires and some with stunt doubles and head replacement. And we needed a very good digital double." Lola VFX, who worked on the pre-serum Steve Rogers scenes in this film and The First Avenger, also worked on shots featuring an elderly Peggy Carter. This involved digitally transposing the facial features of an elderly actress onto the face of Atwell, who had performed her lines with no make-up and only a few tracking markers.

The Helicarriers in the film were completely digital. Earl said, "In [The Avengers] it was more like an aircraft carrier, now it's an aircraft carrier with the addition of battle ship-sized guns. We were all over the carriers [with the virtual camera]. We were on the decks; we were flying next to them. We had a lot of close ups and different angles. And we didn't just have one; we had three. On top of that, we had to destroy them all." This CGI environment was also used in close ups. Earl said, "The challenge was to get in all of the detail to make it feel like it is a real, working ship. We created details down to the railings and all the human-scale stuff. ... For the shots in which we were destroying them, we had to have the internals as well—the hallways, the storage areas." Many of the shots of Washington, D.C., were digitally created due to numerous flight restrictions in the city which necessitated that locations be recreated by computer. However, aerial footage of the city was filmed and used for live action plate photography for shots involving the Triskelion, which is located on Theodore Roosevelt Island on the Potomac River.

350 different versions of the film were made, to accommodate for the different formats it would be released in domestically, while also accounting for international localization and formats. The versions had to be completed in 17 days, versus a normal turnaround time of three to four weeks for contemporary films, to make its theatrical release date. One of the various changes for localization was the contents of Captain America's notebook list seen at the beginning of the film. The first five items were different depending on where the film was released, while the final five items were the same across all prints. Marvel held online polls allowing fans to select the items featured in each country's release.

== Music ==
In June 2013, Henry Jackman announced that he would compose the film's score. About the score Jackman said, "...it's 50% production and all the tricks I've learnt from spending years in the record industry but then it's also got the kind of injection of symphonic, thematic, heroic music that all kind of merges into one musical, and hopefully coherent piece". A soundtrack album was released by Hollywood Records on April 1, 2014.

== Marketing ==
In July 2013, Marvel Studios released a teaser poster depicting a damaged and discolored Captain America shield. The Los Angeles Times said, "the image suggests that [Captain America] might see some serious battle in the sequel" while Rolling Stone said, "the image hints at darker themes in the sequel". Later that month, Marvel Studios head and producer Kevin Feige, directors Joe and Anthony Russo, and cast members Chris Evans, Scarlett Johansson, Samuel L. Jackson, Sebastian Stan, Anthony Mackie, Cobie Smulders, Emily VanCamp, and Frank Grillo held a panel at the 2013 San Diego Comic-Con and presented footage from the film. In addition, Marvel had booths depicting a Smithsonian-type exhibit showing Captain America and the Howling Commandos from Captain America: The First Avenger. At the end of the month, audiences were shown a glimpse of the film along with some of Marvel's other Phase Two slate of films at Disney XD's Disney Fandom event.

In August 2013, Feige, Evans, Stan, and Mackie presented a clip of the film at Disney's D23 Expo. In September 2013, Marvel announced that it is again partnering with Harley-Davidson, continuing their relationship from Captain America: The First Avenger, with Captain America riding the company's Softail Breakout motorcycle in the film.

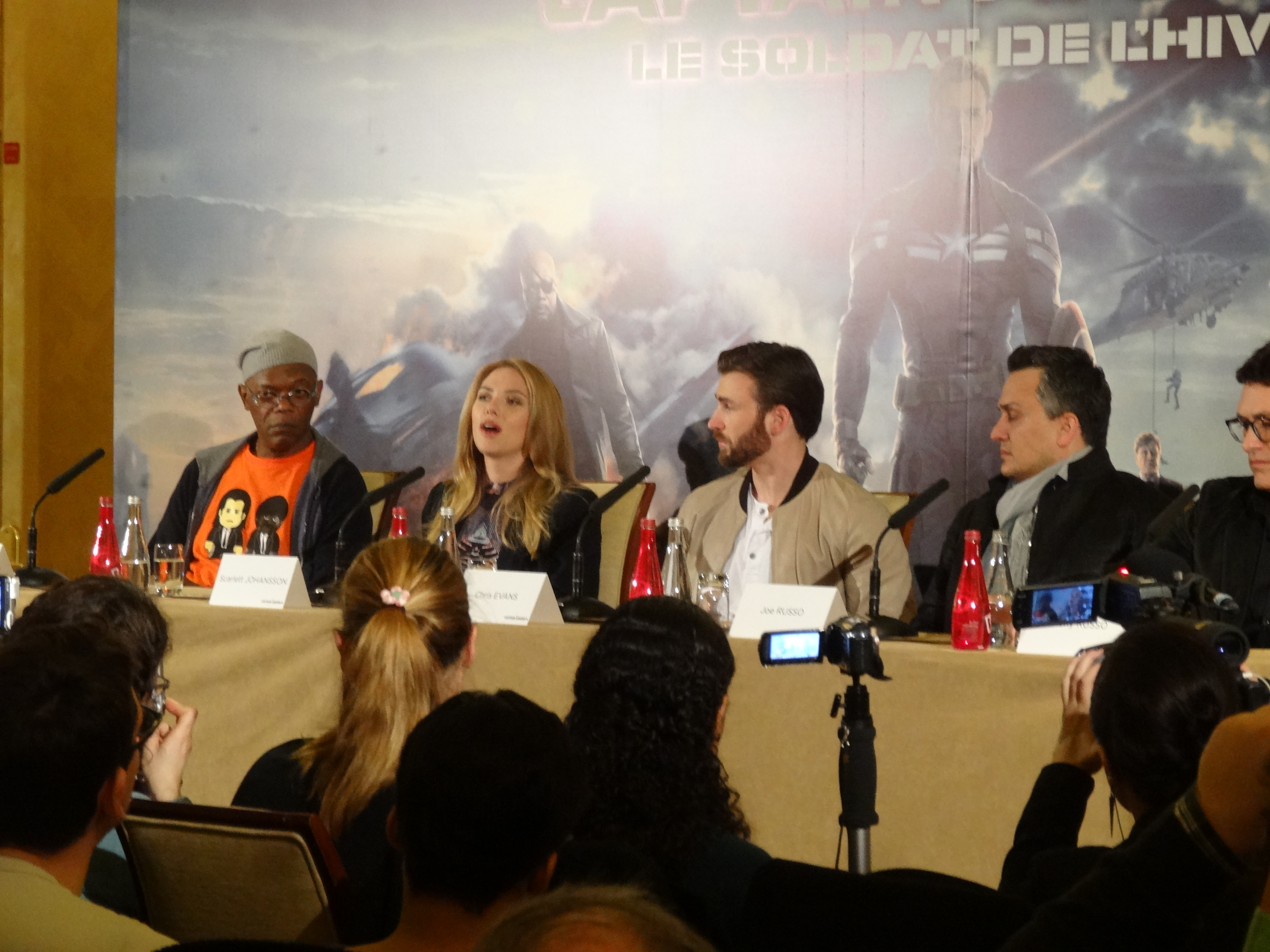
Jackson, Johansson, Evans, and the Russo brothers promoting the film in Paris in March 2014

In October 2013, Marvel released the first trailer for Captain America: The Winter Soldier. The Hollywood Reporter said, "it looks like it'll live up to the 'political thriller' that's been promised for months now." Los Angeles Times said, "[the] trailer runs 2½ minutes and teases plenty of action, conspiracy and clever banter between Captain America and his S.H.I.E.L.D. colleagues, with a smattering of the previously released Comic-Con International and D23 footage." Los Angeles Times also noted that the day before the release of the trailer, the studio released "a teaser for a trailer." The trailer received 23.5 million views in the 24 hours after its release. In November 2013, Jed Whedon, the co-creator of the television series Agents of S.H.I.E.L.D. (2013–2020), said that there were plans to reference events from the film into the show, stating, "Nick Fury is in [Captain America: The Winter Soldier], and S.H.I.E.L.D. makes an appearance, so we will definitely try to tee-up some stuff and probably play a little bit of the fallout from that film."

In January 2014, Disney announced that in honor of the film, Captain America would be making appearances at Disneyland. The meet and greet experience opened March 7, 2014, and is called Captain America: The Living Legend and Symbol of Courage, located at Innoventions in Tomorrowland. Also in January, Marvel Comics released a prelude digital comic titled, Marvel's Captain America: The Winter Soldier Infinite Comic, written by Peter David, with art by Rock-He Kim. The comic sees the return of the "Zodiac", the mysterious weapon first seen in the One-Shot Agent Carter (2013), which has fallen into the wrong hands. Captain America, Black Widow, and Rumlow must track the weapon down and put it back in S.H.I.E.L.D. protection.

The first televised advertisement for Captain America: The Winter Soldier aired during Super Bowl XLVIII on February 2, 2014. According to The Hollywood Reporter, Disney paid over $4 million per 30-second spot. The Los Angeles Times said, "The clip promoting the April 4 release had a recognizably melancholy tone as Chris Evans' patriotic hero grapples with the moral ambiguities of the modern age." Also in February, Gameloft announced that a mobile video game, titled Captain America: The Winter Soldier – The Official Game, would be released in conjunction with the release of the film in late March 2014 for iOS and Android platforms. A few days later General Motors announced that Chevrolet partnered with Marvel Entertainment and provided a specially designed Corvette Stingray C7 for use by the Black Widow in the film. The vehicle debuted at the 2014 Chicago Auto Show, where fans received limited-edition Captain America comic books. Evans was named the grand marshal of the 2014 Daytona 500 to promote the film's release. Later in the month, a 30-second television spot received "a lot of attention on social media" for a line featured in the clip. The line, which was said by Captain America, suggests that Nick Fury would die in the film. The Hollywood Reporter noted that it all seemed "a bit too obvious", noting the fact that Jackson, who plays Fury, would be reprising the role in Avengers: Age of Ultron, although pointing out that it could be in a postmortem flashback appearance.

In March 2014, Marvel released the Captain America Experience app, that allowed fans to capture a picture of themselves with Captain America, and let them share it on Instagram and Twitter using specific hashtags to unlock 10 early screenings of the film across the United States, which took place on March 20. On March 18, ABC aired a one-hour television special, titled Marvel Studios: Assembling a Universe, which included a sneak peek of Captain America: The Winter Soldier. On April 1, 2014, Evans and Stan rang the opening bell of the New York Stock Exchange in honor of the film's theatrical release. Jackson appeared in advertisements for Sky Broadband.

== Release ==
=== Theatrical ===
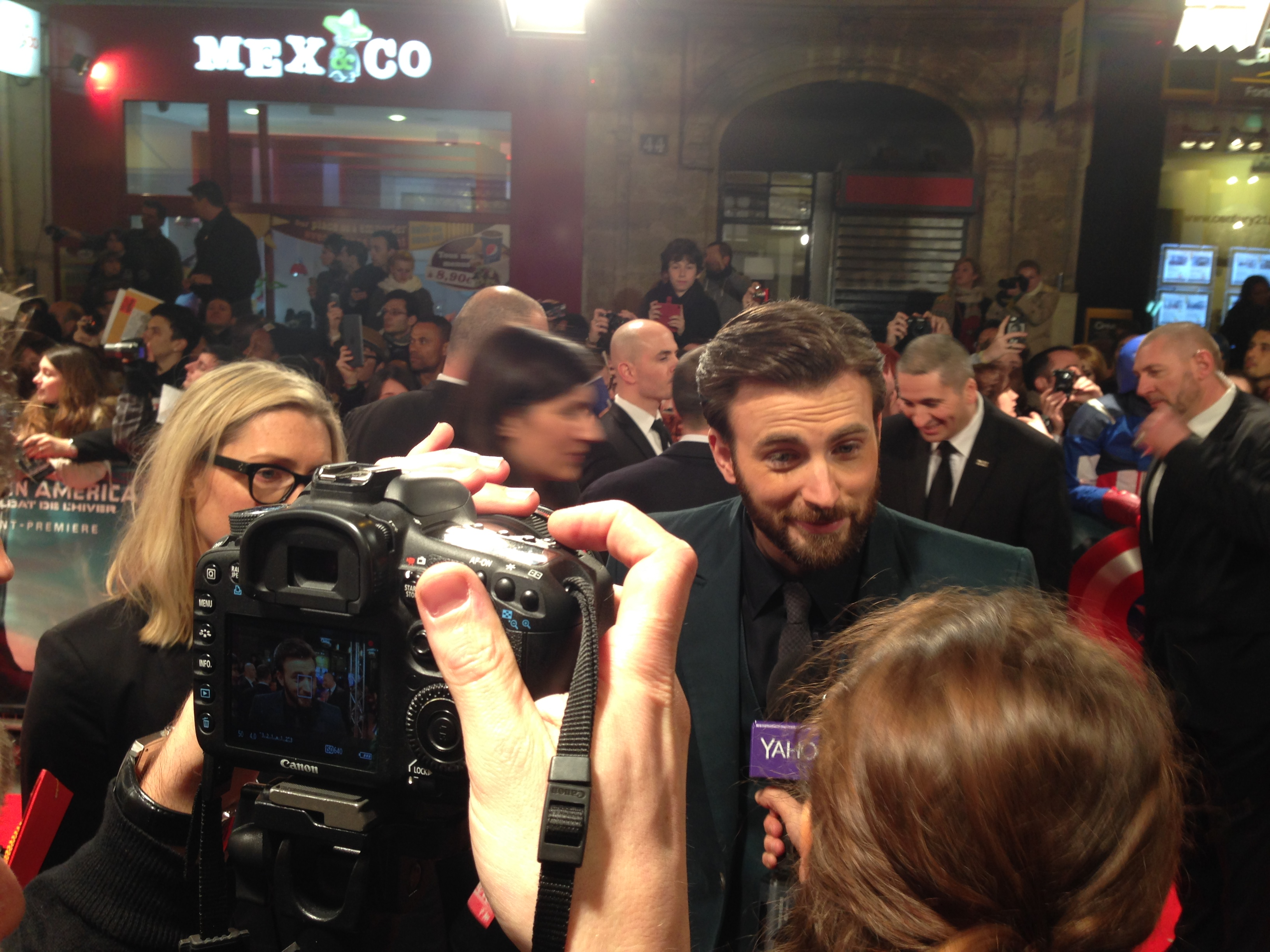
Chris Evans at the Paris premiere of Captain America: The Winter Soldier

Captain America: The Winter Soldier was released in 32 markets on March 26, 2014 and in North America on April 4, 2014, in 2D, 3D and IMAX 3D. The film debuted on 668 IMAX screens worldwide, a record for films releasing in April. The world premiere took place on March 13, 2014, at the El Capitan Theatre in Hollywood, Los Angeles. The Paris premiere occurred on March 17 at Le Grand Rex, the London premiere took place on March 20 at Westfield London, the Beijing premiere took place on March 24 and the Cleveland premiere took place on April 1. Chris Evans and Scarlett Johansson auctioned off passes to one of the premieres for charity. Captain America: The Winter Soldier is part of Phase Two of the MCU.

=== Home media ===
Captain America: The Winter Soldier was released by Walt Disney Studios Home Entertainment for digital download on August 19, 2014, and on Blu-ray, Blu-ray 3D, and DVD on September 9, 2014. The physical media releases include behind-the-scenes featurettes, audio commentary, deleted scenes, and a blooper reel.

The film was also collected in a 13-disc box set, titled "Marvel Cinematic Universe: Phase Two Collection", which includes all of the Phase Two films in the Marvel Cinematic Universe. It was released on December 8, 2015. Captain America: The Winter Soldier was released on 4K UHD Blu-Ray on April 23, 2019.

== Reception ==
=== Box office ===
Captain America: The Winter Soldier earned $259.8 million in North America and $454.7 million in other territories for a worldwide total of $714.4 million. It became the fifth-highest-grossing film of 2014 worldwide. Deadline Hollywood calculated the film's net profit as $166.2 million, accounting for production budgets, marketing, talent participations, and other costs; box office grosses and home media revenues placed it ninth on their list of 2014's "Most Valuable Blockbusters".

Captain America: The Winter Soldier made $10.2 million in Thursday night showings, more than double the midnight gross of its predecessor. It surpassed Fast Five to set an April single-day ($36.9 million) and April opening-weekend record ($95.0 million), while its opening weekend was a 46% increase over its predecessor. The film held the number one spot at the box office for three consecutive weekends, before being overtaken by The Other Woman in its fourth weekend. It achieved the largest total gross among films released in the month of April. In June 2014, it surpassed The Lego Movie to become the highest-grossing film of the year. At the end of its theatrical run, the film became the fourth-highest-grossing film of 2014 behind American Sniper, The Hunger Games: Mockingjay – Part 1, and Guardians of the Galaxy.

Captain America: The Winter Soldier topped the box office on its opening weekend with $75.2 million from 32 overseas markets. The film debuted at number one in many territories, including Australia, China, and Russia and set a 3-day opening-weekend record in China among Disney films, with $38.81 million. It topped the box office outside North America on two consecutive weekends, followed by two weeks in second, behind Rio 2.

=== Critical response ===
The review aggregator Rotten Tomatoes reported an approval rating of 90%, with an average score of 7.7/10, based on 311 reviews. The website's critics consensus reads, "Suspenseful and politically astute, Captain America: The Winter Soldier is a superior entry in the Avengers canon and is sure to thrill Marvel diehards." Metacritic, which uses a weighted average, assigned a score of 70 out of 100 based on 48 critics, indicating "generally favorable" reviews. CinemaScore audiences gave Captain America: The Winter Soldier an "A" grade rating on an A+ to F scale.

Todd McCarthy of The Hollywood Reporter said the film "takes the bold (for Marvel) step of reducing CGI spectacle to a relative minimum in favor of reviving the pleasures of hard-driving old-school action, surprising character development and intriguing suspense." Scott Foundas of Variety said it is "chockfull of the breathless cliffhangers dictated by the genre, but equally rich in the quiet, tender character moments that made the first film unique among recent Marvel fare." Richard Roeper of the Chicago Sun-Times considered it "another rock-solid chapter in the big-screen story of Marvel," though he compared it unfavorably to The Avengers, Iron Man and Iron Man 3. Owen Gleiberman of Entertainment Weekly noted the topicality of the film, and compared it to The Dark Knight (2008). Ty Burr of The Boston Globe said the film "delivers all the 3D CGI mayhem audiences have come to expect from the Marvel entertainment juggernaut, but there's darkness and confusion just under its comic-book surface." Joe Morgenstern of The Wall Street Journal praised the film's "emotional bandwidth" and nuances, and felt it fixed all the shortcomings of The First Avenger "and then some".

Conversely, Kenneth Turan of the Los Angeles Times characterized the film with a lack of inspiration. Manohla Dargis of The New York Times said, "Like many others of its type, [Captain America: The Winter Soldier] gets off to a kinetic start only to lose steam before blowing everything up." Robbie Collin of The Daily Telegraph expressed disappointment with the lack of risks taken by the film compared to its "relatively spicy premise". Mick LaSalle of the San Francisco Chronicle felt the film was too long, with unexciting and illegible action scenes. Joe Williams of the St. Louis Post Dispatch felt The Winter Soldier didn't explore the issues it raised and paled in comparison to The First Avenger. Jake Coyle of the Associated Press said the film's biggest misstep was the handling of Stan's Winter Soldier, and that it was "getting difficult to tell the Marvel movies apart".

Several critics have drawn comparisons between The Winter Soldier and the Metal Gear Solid video game series. Gameranx compared the film to Metal Gear Solid 2: Sons of Liberty (2001), stating that the first half of The Winter Soldier "feels like probably the closest movie adaptation we've gotten to Metal Gear Solid 2", with similar elements including the "stealth, an evil group, CQC, and even the moral dilemma about sacrificing one's personal liberties for the feeling of security." Entertainment Weekly noted that the film's opening tanker mission was "rendered as a Metal Gear Solid stealth mission". Eye For Film also said the opening sequence "will no doubt be familiar to anyone who's ever played Metal Gear Solid 2".

=== Accolades ===
Year	Award / Film Festival	Category	Recipient(s)	Result	Ref(s)
2014	Golden Trailer Awards	Best Action	Captain America: The Winter Soldier	Nominated	
2014	Golden Trailer Awards	Best Action TV Spot	Captain America: The Winter Soldier	Won	
2014	Golden Trailer Awards	Best Music TV Spot	Captain America: The Winter Soldier	Nominated	
2014	Teen Choice Awards	Choice Movie: Sci-Fi/Fantasy	Captain America: The Winter Soldier	Nominated	
2014	Teen Choice Awards	Choice Movie Actor: Sci-Fi/Fantasy	Chris Evans	Nominated	
2014	Teen Choice Awards	Choice Movie Actress: Sci-Fi/Fantasy	Scarlett Johansson	Nominated	
2014	Teen Choice Awards	Choice Movie: Chemistry	Chris Evans and Anthony Mackie	Nominated	
2014	Teen Choice Awards	Choice Movie: Liplock	Chris Evans and Scarlett Johansson	Nominated	
2014	Teen Choice Awards	Choice Movie: Scene Stealer	Anthony Mackie	Nominated	
2014	Young Hollywood Awards	Super Superhero	Chris Evans	Nominated	
2014	Washington D.C. Film Critics Awards	The Joe Barber Award for Best Portrayal of Washington, D.C.	Captain America: The Winter Soldier	Won	
2015	Critics' Choice Movie Awards	Best Action Movie	Captain America: The Winter Soldier	Nominated	
2015	Critics' Choice Movie Awards	Best Actor in an Action Movie	Chris Evans	Nominated	
2015	People's Choice Awards	Favorite Movie	Captain America: The Winter Soldier	Nominated	
2015	People's Choice Awards	Favorite Movie Actress	Scarlett Johansson	Nominated	
2015	People's Choice Awards	Favorite Movie Duo	Chris Evans and Scarlett Johansson	Nominated	
2015	People's Choice Awards	Favorite Action Movie	Captain America: The Winter Soldier	Nominated	
2015	People's Choice Awards	Favorite Action Movie Actor	Chris Evans	Won	
2015	People's Choice Awards	Favorite Action Movie Actress	Scarlett Johansson	Nominated	
2015	Academy Awards	Best Visual Effects	Dan DeLeeuw, Russell Earl, Bryan Grill and Dan Sudick	Nominated	
2015	Art Directors Guild Awards	Best Production Design for a Fantasy Film	Peter Wenham	Nominated	
2015	Kids' Choice Awards	Favorite Female Action Star	Scarlett Johansson	Nominated	
2015	Kids' Choice Awards	Favorite Male Action Star	Chris Evans	Nominated	
2015	Saturn Awards	Best Comic-to-Film Motion Picture	Captain America: The Winter Soldier	Nominated	
2015	Saturn Awards	Best Director	Joe Russo and Anthony Russo	Nominated	
2015	Saturn Awards	Best Writing	Christopher Markus & Stephen McFeely	Nominated	
2015	Saturn Awards	Best Actor	Chris Evans	Nominated	
2015	Saturn Awards	Best Supporting Actor	Anthony Mackie	Nominated	
2015	Saturn Awards	Best Supporting Actor	Samuel L. Jackson	Nominated	
2015	Saturn Awards	Best Supporting Actress	Scarlett Johansson	Nominated	
2015	Saturn Awards	Best Music	Henry Jackman	Nominated	
2015	Saturn Awards	Best Editing	Jeffrey Ford and Matthew Schmidt	Nominated	
2015	Saturn Awards	Best Production Design	Peter Wenham	Nominated	
2015	Saturn Awards	Best Special Effects	Dan DeLeeuw, Russell Earl, Bryan Grill, and Dan Sudick	Nominated	
2015	Visual Effects Society Awards	Outstanding Created Environment in a Photoreal/Live Action Feature Motion Picture	Johan Thorngren, Greg Kegel, Quentin Marmier, Luis Calero for "Triskelion"	Nominated	
2015	Visual Effects Society Awards	Outstanding Effects Simulations in a Photoreal/Live Action Feature Motion Picture	Dan Pearson, Sheldon Serrao, Jose Burgos, Eric Jennings for "Helicarrier broadside and crash"	Nominated	
2015	Empire Awards	Best Thriller	Captain America: The Winter Soldier	Nominated	
2015	MTV Movie Awards	Best Fight	Chris Evans vs. Sebastian Stan	Nominated	
2015	MTV Movie Awards	Best Kiss	Scarlett Johansson and Chris Evans	Nominated	
2015	Make-Up Artists & Hair Stylists Guild Awards	Best Contemporary Make-Up	Allan Apone, Nicole Sortillon and Lisa Rocco	Nominated	

== Sequel ==
Captain America: Civil War was released on May 6, 2016, with the Russo brothers returning to direct, and Markus and McFeely again writing the screenplay. Evans, Johansson, Stan, Mackie, VanCamp, and Grillo reprise their roles from The Winter Soldier and are joined by Robert Downey Jr. as Tony Stark / Iron Man, Paul Bettany as Vision, Jeremy Renner as Clint Barton / Hawkeye, Don Cheadle as James "Rhodey" Rhodes / War Machine, Elizabeth Olsen as Wanda Maximoff, Paul Rudd as Scott Lang / Ant-Man, and William Hurt as Thaddeus "Thunderbolt" Ross, all reprising their roles from previous MCU films. Tom Holland and Chadwick Boseman appear as Peter Parker / Spider-Man and T'Challa / Black Panther, respectively.

== See also ==
- "What If... the Watcher Broke His Oath?", an episode of the MCU television series What If...? that reimagines some events of this film
- List of films featuring surveillance
- List of films featuring drones
