= Jeffrey Ford (film editor) =

American film editor (born 1968)

- Born: February 16, 1968 (age 58); Novato, California, US
- Occupation: Film editor
- Years active: 1994–present

Jeffrey Ford (born February 16, 1968) is an American film editor. He was nominated for an ACE Eddie Award for Best Edited Film - Musical or Comedy for The Family Stone and for a Golden Satellite Award for Best Film Editing for One Hour Photo.

== Career ==
While working on some of the films set in the Marvel Cinematic Universe, Ford came up with the idea to include Robert Downey Jr.'s line of "And I... am... Iron Man." at the end of Avengers: Endgame.

In 2022, Ford provided the vocal effects of Man-Thing in the Marvel Cinematic Universe special Werewolf by Night which aired on Disney+.

== Filmography ==
=== Television ===
Year	Title	Role	Notes
2022	Werewolf by Night	Man-Thing vocal effects	TV special

== Crew work ==
Year	Film	Director	Co-editor(s)
2000	The Yards	James Gray	
2002	One Hour Photo	Mark Romanek	
2003	Shattered Glass	Billy Ray	
2005	Hide and Seek	John Polson	
2005	The Family Stone	Thomas Bezucha	
2007	Breach	Billy Ray	
2008	Street Kings	David Ayer	
2009	Public Enemies	Michael Mann	Paul Rubell
2010	Bloodworth	Shane Dax Taylor	
2011	Monte Carlo	Thomas Bezucha	
2011	Captain America: The First Avenger	Joe Johnston	Robert Dalva
2012	The Avengers	Joss Whedon	Lisa Lassek
2013	Iron Man 3	Shane Black	Peter S. Elliot
2014	Captain America: The Winter Soldier	Anthony and Joe Russo	Matthew Schmidt
2015	Avengers: Age of Ultron	Joss Whedon	Lisa Lassek
2016	Captain America: Civil War	Anthony and Joe Russo	Matthew Schmidt
2018	Avengers: Infinity War	Anthony and Joe Russo	Matthew Schmidt
2019	Avengers: Endgame	Anthony and Joe Russo	Matthew Schmidt
2020	Let Him Go	Thomas Bezucha	Meg Reticker
2021	The Falcon and the Winter Soldier	Kari Skogland	Kelley Dixon, Todd Desrosiers, Rosanne Tan
2021	Spider-Man: No Way Home	Jon Watts	Leigh Folsom Boyd
2022	Werewolf by Night	Michael Giacchino	
2025	The Electric State	Anthony and Joe Russo	
2026	Avengers: Doomsday	Anthony and Joe Russo	Matthew Schmidt
2027	Avengers: Secret Wars	Anthony and Joe Russo	Matthew Schmidt
