= Mary Jo Markey =

American television and film editor

- Occupations: Television and film editor

Mary Jo Markey is an American television and film editor. Markey has been elected to membership of the American Cinema Editors society. She is a frequent collaborator with J. J. Abrams and Maryann Brandon.

== Career ==
Markey has edited several mainstream films including The Perks of Being a Wallflower and Mission: Impossible III. She has also worked as an editor on several television shows, such as three episodes of Felicity, Breaking News, Skin, fourteen episodes of Alias, and was also chief editor on Lost.

She worked with Abrams on three of his television shows (Felicity, Alias, and Lost), and on almost all of his feature films as director with Maryann Brandon, with Star Wars: The Rise of Skywalker being the lone exception. Markey worked with Abrams on Star Wars: The Force Awakens, which was released in December 2015. Along with her co-editor Brandon, she received an Academy Award nomination for Best Film Editing for her work on the film.

In her role editing Abrams' Star Trek, she reported she did not realize that he intended to make extensive use of lens flares and bright lighting, and contacted the film developers asking why the film seemed overexposed.

== Filmography ==
=== Feature films ===
Year	Title	Director	Notes
1996	Mariette in Ecstasy	John Bailey	Co-edited with Greg Finton
2002	Dawg	Victoria Hochberg	Co-edited with Claudia Finkle
2006	Mission: Impossible III	J. J. Abrams	Co-edited with Maryann Brandon
2009	Star Trek	J. J. Abrams	Co-edited with Maryann Brandon: Nominated — ACE Eddie for Best Edited Feature Film - Dramatic; Nominated — HPA Award for Outstanding Editing - Feature Film
2010	Killers	Robert Luketic	Co-edited with Richard Francis-Bruce
2011	Super 8	J. J. Abrams	Co-edited with Maryann Brandon: Nominated — Saturn Award for Best Editing; Nominated — HPA Award for Outstanding Editing - Feature Film; Nominated — PFCS Award for Best Film Editing
2012	The Perks of Being a Wallflower	Stephen Chbosky	
2013	Star Trek Into Darkness	J. J. Abrams	Co-edited with Maryann Brandon
2015	Star Wars: The Force Awakens	J. J. Abrams	Co-edited with Maryann Brandon: Saturn Award for Best Editing; Nominated — Academy Award for Best Film Editing; Nominated — ACE Eddie for Best Edited Feature Film - Dramatic; Nominated — ACCA Award for Best Film Editing; Nominated — COFCA Award for Best Film Editing; Nominated — OFTA Award for Best Film Editing
2016	The Great Wall	Zhang Yimou	Co-edited with Craig Wood
2017	Life	Daniel Espinosa	Co-edited with Frances Parker
2019	Charlie's Angels	Elizabeth Banks	Co-edited with Alan Baumgarten
2021	The Eyes of Tammy Faye	Michael Showalter	

=== Television films ===
Year	Title	Director	Notes
1996	The Cold Equations	Peter Geiger	
1997	The Stepsisters	Charles Correll	
1998	Rhapsody in Bloom	Craig M. Saavedra	
1998	Meteorites!	Chris Thomson	
1998	Giving Up the Ghost	Claudia Weill	
2007	Life Support	Nelson George	Nominated — Primetime Emmy Award for Outstanding Single-Camera Picture Editing for a Limited Series or Movie; Nominated — ACE Eddie for Best Edited Miniseries or Motion Picture for Non-Commercial Television
2009	Anatomy of Hope	J. J. Abrams	
2014	The Money	Justin Chadwick	

=== Television series ===
Year	Title	Network	Episode(s)
1998–2002	Felicity	The WB	14
2001–2004	Alias	ABC	14
2004–2009	Lost	ABC	12
