= Maryann Brandon =

American television and film editor

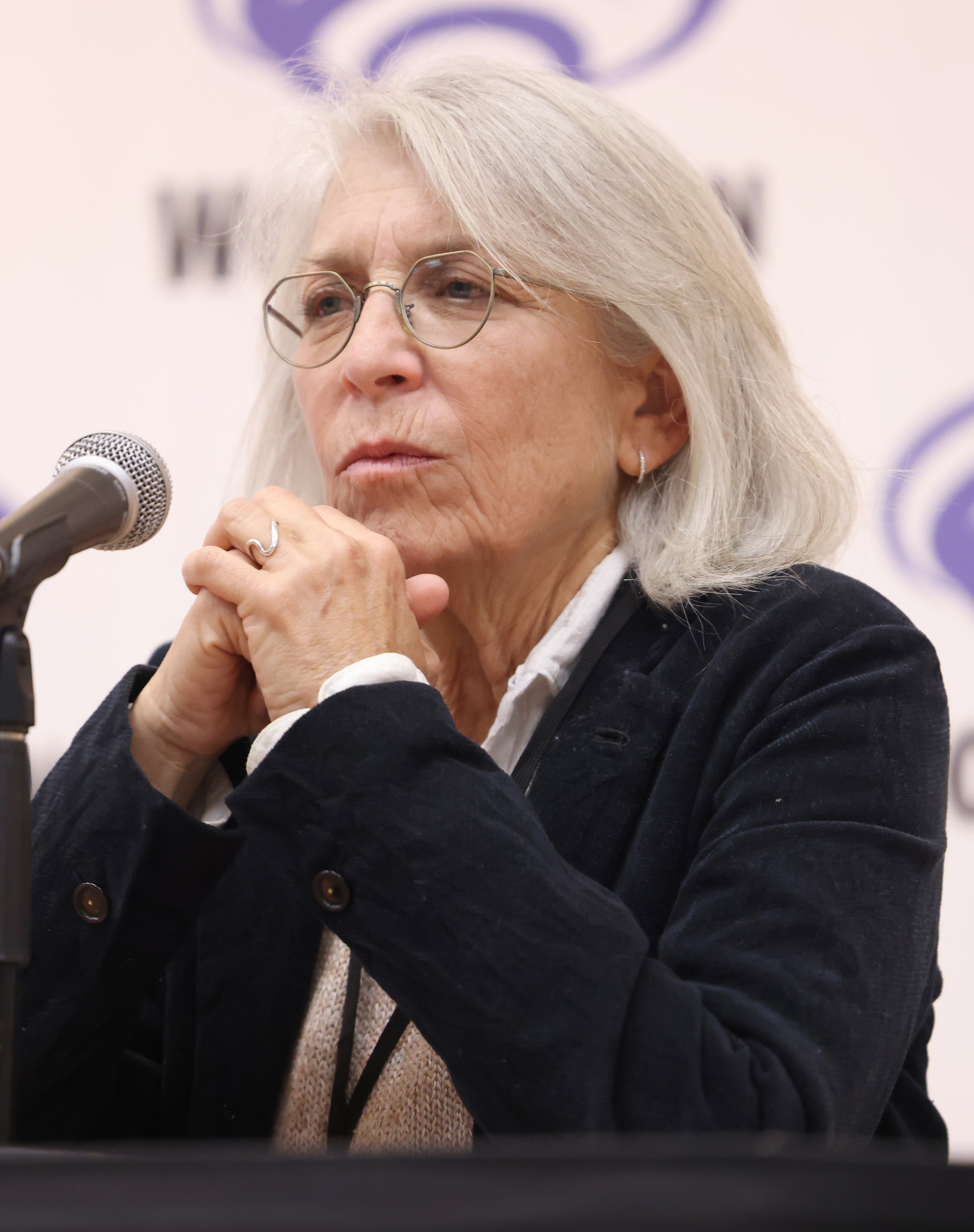
Brandon at the 2025 WonderCon

Maryann Brandon A.C.E., is an American television and film editor. She is a frequent collaborator with J. J. Abrams.

Brandon earned a Primetime Emmy Award nomination for her editing work on the popular television series Alias, created by Abrams. Brandon was also an associate producer on Alias during its final season. She has since edited almost all of Abrams' films with Mary Jo Markey, with Star Wars: The Rise of Skywalker being the lone exception, as she edited that film with Stefan Grube. Brandon worked with Abrams on Star Wars: The Force Awakens, which was released in December 2015. She received an Academy Award nomination for Best Film Editing for her work on the film, sharing the nomination with Mary Jo Markey.

In her role editing Abrams' Star Trek, she reported that neither editor had been told that he intended to make extensive use of lens flares and bright lighting, and they initially contacted the film developers asking why the film seemed overexposed.

== Partial filmography ==
Film	Year	Notes
Bingo	1991	
The Birds II: Land's End	1994	
Born to Be Wild	1995	
Grumpier Old Men	1995	Edited with Seth Flaum and Billy Weber
A Thousand Acres	1997	
The Miracle Worker	2000	
Alias	2001	
Mission: Impossible III	2006	Edited with Mary Jo Markey
The Jane Austen Book Club	2007	
Star Trek	2009	Edited with Mary Jo Markey
How to Train Your Dragon	2010	Edited with Darren T. Holmes
Super 8	2011	Edited with Mary Jo Markey
Kung Fu Panda 2	2011	Edited with Clare Knight
Star Trek Into Darkness	2013	Edited with Mary Jo Markey
Endless Love	2014	
Star Wars: The Force Awakens	2015	Edited with Mary Jo Markey
Passengers	2016	
The Darkest Minds	2018	
Venom	2018	Edited with Alan Baumgarten
Star Wars: The Rise of Skywalker	2019	Edited with Stefan Grube
Venom: Let There Be Carnage	2021	Edited with Stan Salfas
