= Hollywood Professional Association =

American trade organization

The Hollywood Professional Association (HPA; formerly Hollywood Post Alliance) is a Southern California-based trade association founded in 2002. It presents awards to individuals and organizations to recognize achievements in post-production.
